= Macon Airport =

Macon Airport can refer to:

- Macon Downtown Airport
- Middle Georgia Regional Airport
