= Camp Wheeler =

U.S. Army base in Georgia, U.S.

- Macon, Georgia in the United States of America
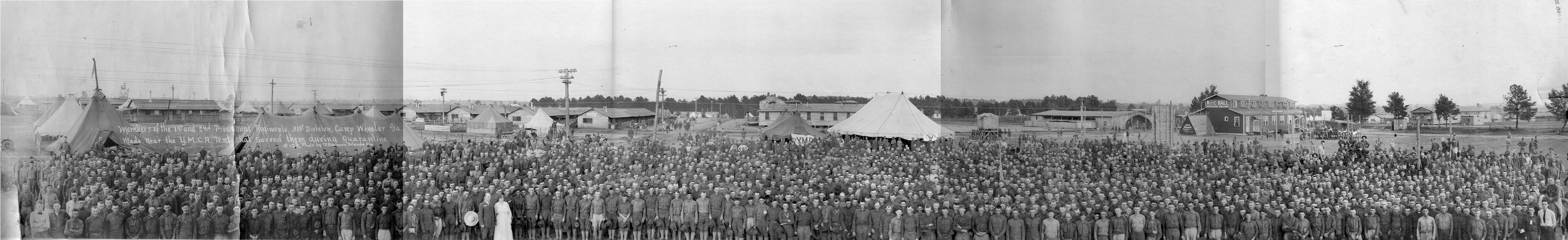
- Camp Wheeler, 1918

Site information
- Type: Former US Army Training Camp

Location
- Location within Georgia Location within the United States
- Coordinates: 32.812°N 83.542°W
- Area: 21,480 acres (8,693 ha)

Site history
- In use: 1917–1919; 1940–1945

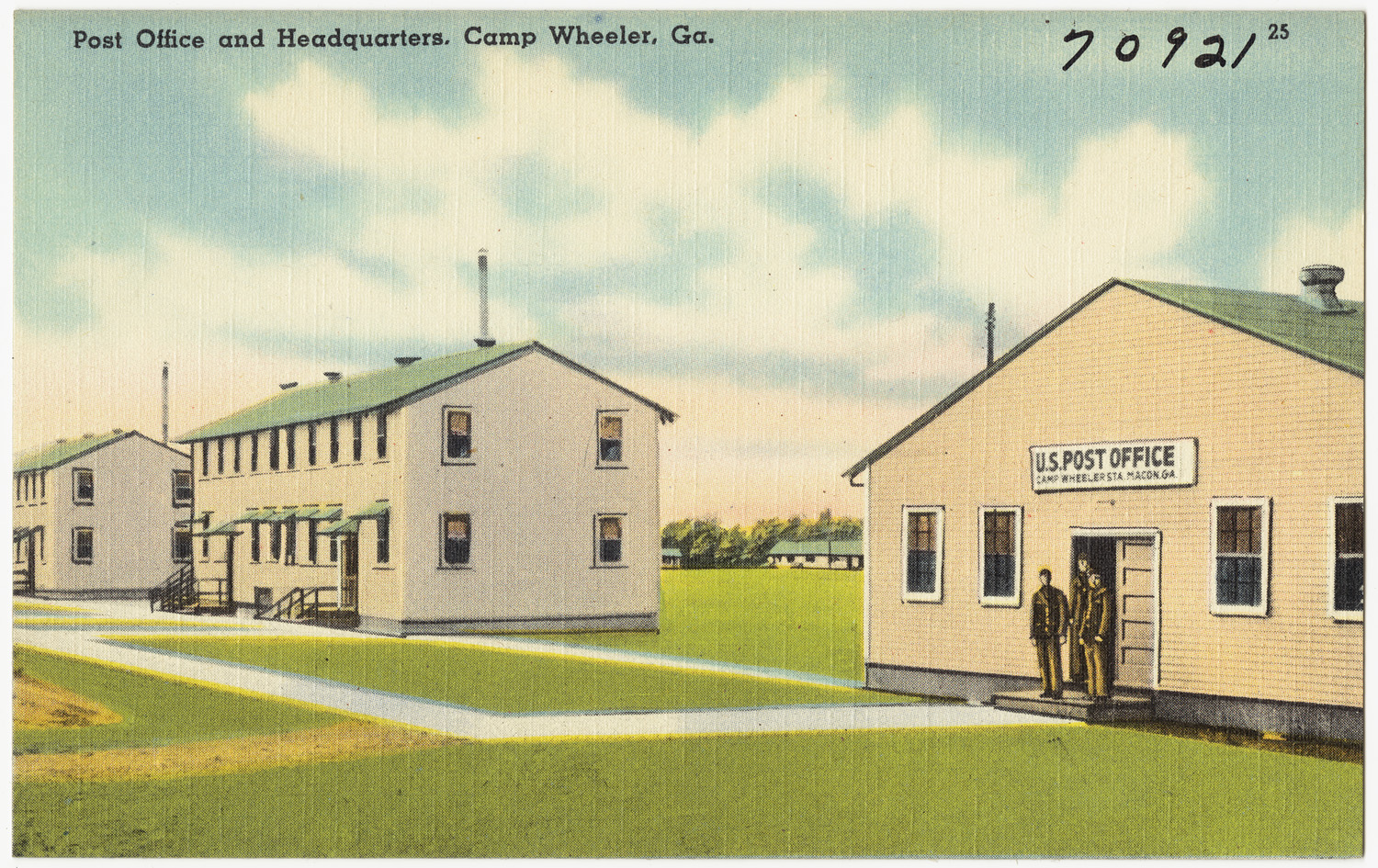
Post Office and headquarters, Camp Wheeler, Ga. 1930 - 1945 (approx)

Camp Wheeler was a United States Army base near Macon, Georgia. The camp was a staging location for many US Army units during World War I and World War II. It was named for Joseph Wheeler, a general in the Confederate States of America's Army and in the U.S. Army in the Spanish–American War.

The War Department used the site area of Camp Wheeler as a mobilization center from 1917 to 1918. It was established on July 18, 1917, as a temporary training camp for National Guard units in federal service and consisted primarily of tents in a cantonment area for the 29,000 officers and enlisted men. The military closed the first Camp Wheeler on April 10, 1919.

The military used Camp Wheeler as an infantry replacement center from 1940 to 1945. The base was re-established on October 8, 1940, with construction beginning on December 21, 1940. Rather than being used to train entire units, the camp was an Infantry Replacement Training Center where new recruits received basic and advanced individual training to replace combat casualties. The camp was divided into three major portions: a cantonment area, a maneuver area, and a main impact area. At the height of the training effort, the camp contained 17,000 trainees and 3,000 cadre personnel. The camp was declared excess on January 19, 1946. Following a decontamination operation in the fall of 1946, the land was returned to the owners.

Among units that staged there was the 7th Infantry Division.

A 1,000-bed hospital and a prisoner-of-war camp were included in the World War II camp.

In 2011, the U.S. Army Corps of Engineers completed a survey of the site, locating unexploded ordnance and other contamination; cleaning up the site was estimated at the time to take eight years.

Today, Macon Downtown Airport and Ocmulgee East Industrial Park occupy the site of the former camp.
