= International Cherry Blossom Festival =

Annual spring festival in Georgia, US

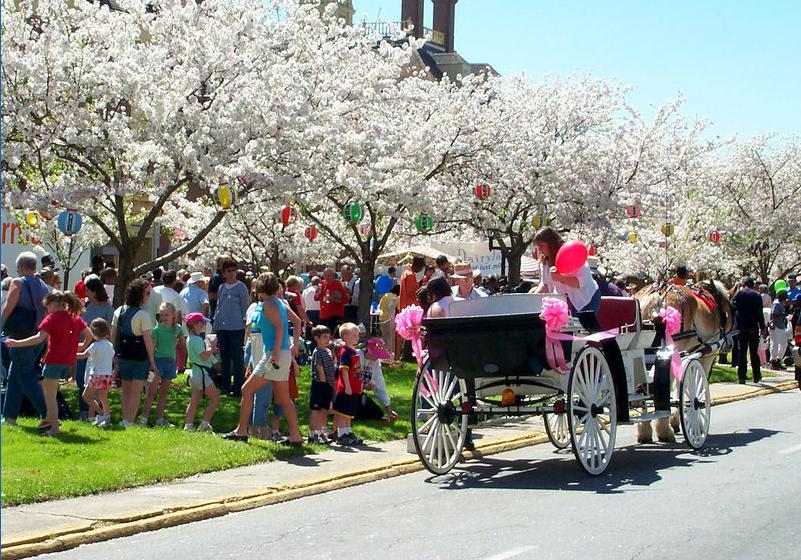
- Status: Active
- Frequency: Annually
- Location: Macon, Georgia
- Coordinates: 32.8328°N 83.6148°W
- Years active: 44
- Inaugurated: 1982
- Founder: Carolyn Crayton
- Website: International Cherry Blossom Festival Online

The International Cherry Blossom Festival is held in Macon, Georgia, every spring. Macon, known as the "Cherry Blossom Capital of the World," has around 300,000–350,000 Yoshino Cherry Trees that bloom around the city in late March every year. The festival, held to coincide with the typical blooming period, lasts for ten days and features events for people of all ages. It has been an annual event since 1982, though the 2020 edition was cancelled due to the COVID-19 pandemic.

The festival is not associated with the National Cherry Blossom Festival held in Washington, D.C.

== History ==
=== Early history ===
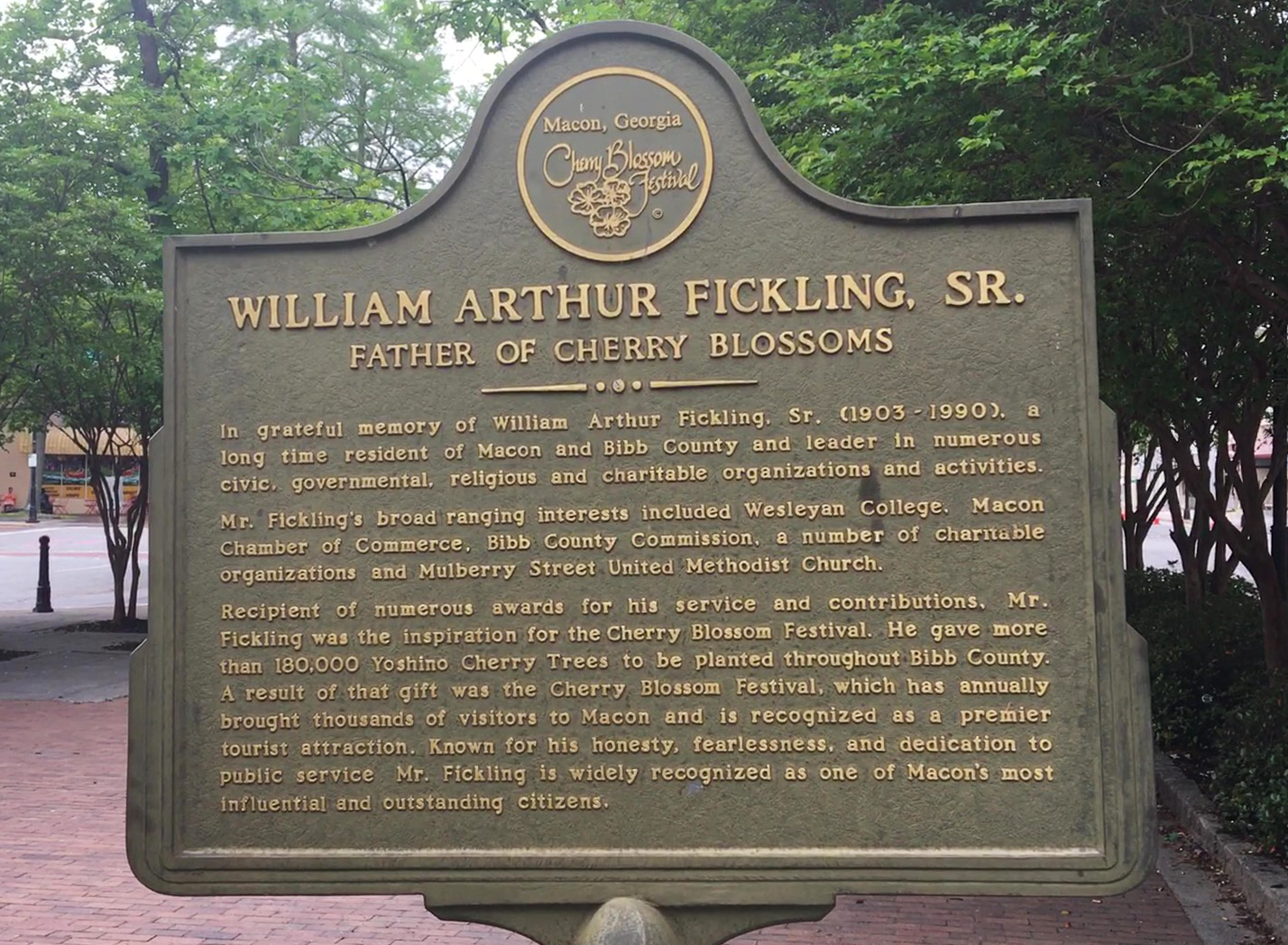
Historical Marker for William A. Fickling

William A. Fickling, Sr., a local realtor, discovered the beauty of the Yoshino Cherry Trees in his own yard. At the time, he did not know the tree's species or that the species is not native to the South. During a trip to Washington, D.C. in 1952, he discovered a tree that looked identical to the ones growing in his yard. After comparing cut samples from each tree to those at the Tidal Basin, he discovered that they matched. Following this discovery, Fickling began to propagate the trees and give them away to those in the community. He became known as Macon's Johnny Appleseed.

A new resident to Macon, Carolyn Crayton, noticed the trees and thought they were beautiful. She approached Fickling at a picnic and spoke about planting more trees throughout Macon. To start the project, Fickling agreed to donate the trees if she would organize the planting. On November 24, 1973, the first Yoshino cherry trees were planted. The community planted around 500 trees down Wesleyan Woods Drive and along Guerry Drive and Oxford Road. Over the years, the trees became a common sight around the city and grew to become an identifying symbol of the city.

=== The First Festival ===
Fickling donated about 30,000 trees by 1982. Crayton had the idea to celebrate Fickling and the trees he brought to the city. Her and The Keep Macon-Bibb Beautiful Commission worked to create the event. Macon celebrated its first International Cherry Blossom Festival that spring. The event lasted three days and was held at the Wesleyan College campus. Initially, it was meant to be a one time event, but it was so well received it became an annual celebration.

=== Today ===
There was no event in 2020 due to the COVID-19 pandemic; the 39th was deferred to 2021.

The community continues to plant Yoshinos each year with the trees being donated by the Fickling Family Foundation after William Fickling's death.

== Organization and Events ==
=== Organization ===
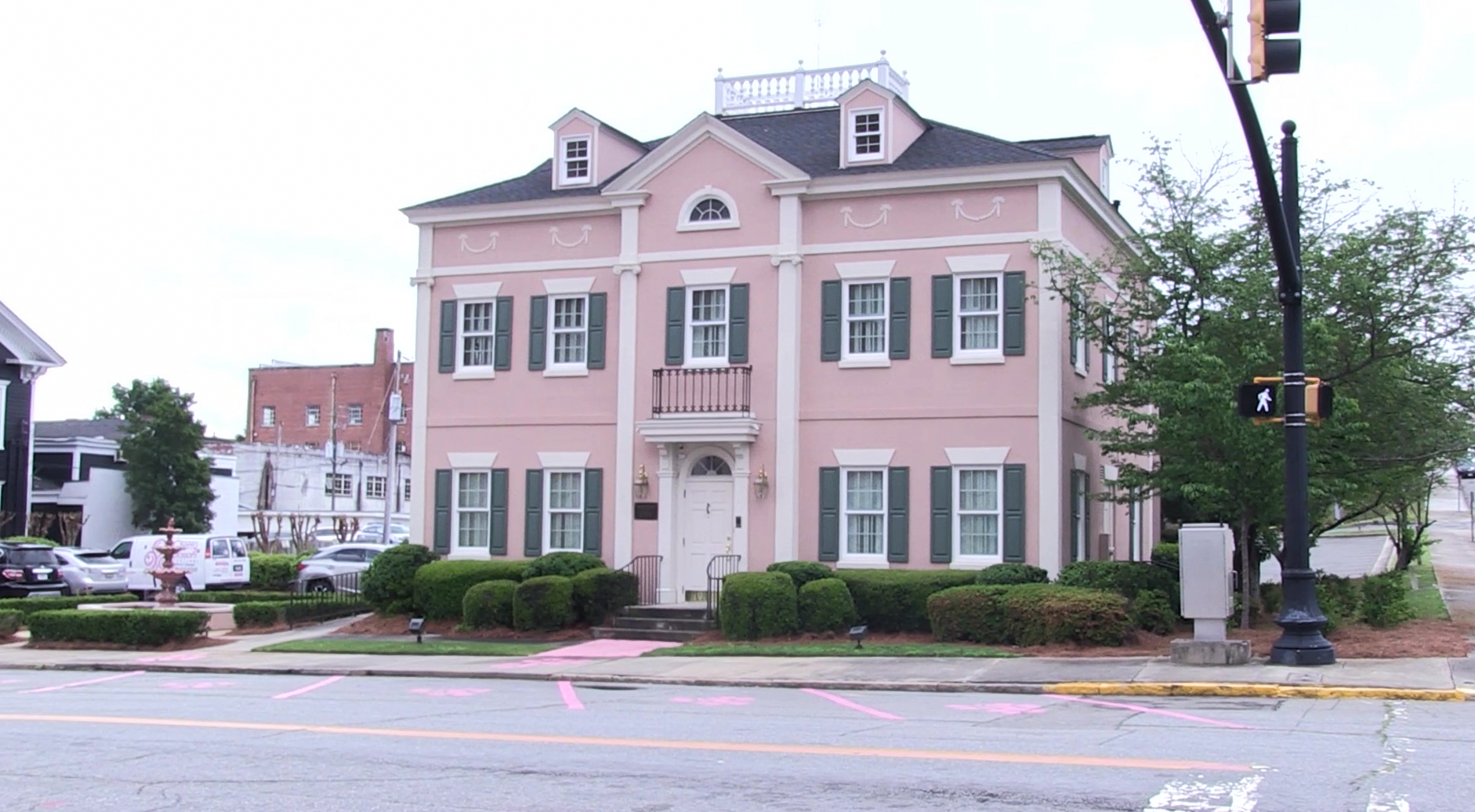
Cherry Blossom Festival Headquarters

Festival organization is started months in advance of each festival. During this time, the Cherry Blossom board of directors and staff work on planning events, securing sponsors and working with the community to produce the festival. Volunteers from the community, like the Think Pink committee, also contribute to the festival through setting up and running events. In the approaching days of the festival, staff and volunteers make final preparations for the festival. Fountain water is dyed pink and cherry blossoms are painted around the area. The festival board also works together with Bibb County Sheriff's office to secure the festival as it is going on.

=== Events ===
Each year the Macon International Cherry Blossom Festival begins with a ribbon-cutting ceremony.

The festival often holds animal shows, concerts, theatrical performances, international showcase events, house tours, fashion shows, galas, luncheons, marathons, dances, fair rides, and bus tours along scenic Cherry Blossom trails. While some events vary each year, annual events include:

- Pink Pancake Breakfast- The Macon-Bibb County Fire Department hosts the breakfast in Central City park. The event began in 1990 and serves as a fundraiser for the American Cancer Society.
- Mulberry Street Festival - An outdoor fine arts and crafts show held on Mulberry Street in downtown Macon, featuring artists from around the nation.
- International Food Fair - Held with the Mulberry Street Festival, it sells food from traditions around the world. Presented by Mellow Mushroom Macon.
- Cherry Blossom Street Party - Bands and performers of rock, blues, country, and other genres play live music at night.
- Cherry Blossom Pageant - A royal court of one queen and four princesses are chosen every year.
- Air Show - Held every year at the Macon Downtown Airport, it features aerobatic performances by military airplanes.
- Cherry Blossom Parade- Floats, marching bands, and performers ride around historic downtown Macon.
- Ocmulgee Lantern Light Tour - A guided twilight walk through the trails of Ocmulgee National Monument.
- Tunes and Balloons Festival Finale - Hot air balloons, live music, family activities, and fireworks close out the festival. It takes place on the Middle Georgia State University Macon campus.

== International Reach ==
The festival has had visitors from all over the world. Officials and delegates from European countries such as Ireland and other countries including Taiwan, Russia, and Uganda have visited the festival and participated in parades in celebration of the theme "love, beauty, and international friendship". Jean-Patrick Courtois, mayor of Mâcon, France, visited the festival in 2013 to celebrate the 40th anniversary of the two sister city's relationship.

Japan has a long history with the Macon Cherry Blossom Festival. At the first annual festival, representatives from Kurobe, Macon's sister city, visited the festival. After that year, Kurobe has sent gifts to the festival varying from lanterns to flowers every year since.

== Economic impact ==
The Macon Cherry Blossom Festival is a 501(c)3 organization that is funded primarily by sponsors. However, the festival has a large impact on the economy of Macon. In 2018, it was estimated that there were over 100,000 visitors. About 30 percent of those visitors were said to be from out of town. The same year, it was estimated that the festival alone brought in about $3 million. Visitors of the festival also spend money at hotels, shops, restaurants and other tourist attractions in the area, benefiting the local economy. Every year the overall economic impact of the festival ranges from $10 million to $12 million, according to a University of Georgia study.

== Awards ==
The International Cherry Blossom Festival has been recognized by the International Festivals and Events Association. The festival has won Haas & Wilkerson Pinnacle awards in Gold, Silver and Bronze in a variety of categories. Awards were for the festival's promotion, programming, sponsorship, merchandise, media campaigns, and community outreach.

== See also ==
- Hanami
- National Cherry Blossom Festival
