= Macon City Auditorium =

- Municipal Auditorium
- U.S. National Register of Historic Places
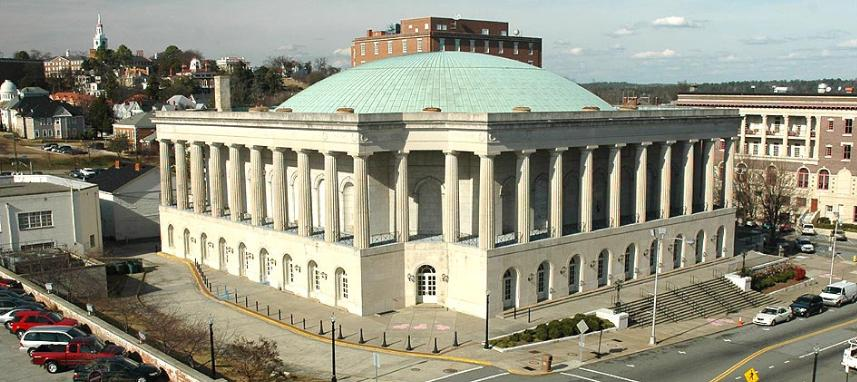
- Macon City Auditorium

- Location within Georgia Location within the United States
- Location: 415-435 1st St., Macon, Georgia
- Coordinates: 32°50′14″N 83°37′53″W
- Area: 1 acre (0.40 ha)
- Built: 1925
- Architect: Egerton Swartwout (primary), Dennis & Dennis (associate)
- Architectural style: Classical Revival, Greek Revival
- NRHP reference No.: 71000262
- Added to NRHP: June 21, 1971

The Macon City Auditorium is an historic structure in Macon, Georgia, United States, that has hosted performances, meetings, and events for the community since 1925. It was designed by New York architect Egerton Swartwout. It was listed on the National Register of Historic Places as Municipal Auditorium in 1971.

Located nearly across the street from Macon's historic City Hall, the auditorium is designed in a similar Classical style, surrounded on three sides by limestone Doric columns.

The building is capped by a copper dome, claimed by many locals to be the largest in the world, though verifying the fact has proved difficult. Below the dome, the Great Hall seats 2,688 total, split between the 14,000-square-foot (1,300 m^{2}) floor (typically configured with folding chairs and tables for various uses) and a balcony with fixed seating for 988. Over the stage, a Don Carlos Dubois and Wilbur Kurtz mural contains scenes from Macon area history from the Spanish explorations of Hernando de Soto to the early twentieth century.

Though it is significantly older than, and geographically separate from, the other building in the complex, the auditorium is maintained as part of the Macon Centreplex, which also includes the Macon Coliseum. The latter two facilities comprise a single building on the east side of the Ocmulgee River, and for many in the general public, "the Centreplex" refers specifically to that property, while the downtown structure continues to be colloquially known simply as "the Auditorium".

The Macon Coliseum has about 9,000 seats while the Macon City Auditorium has 2,688.

== Recent events ==
- Funeral for Otis Redding (1967)
- Oprah Winfrey filmed her 2007 episode, "Oprah's Favorite Things", in the Macon City Auditorium on November 17, 2007.
- 2016 Celtic Women Destiny Tour
