= City Hall (Macon, Georgia) =

Coordinates: 32°50′10″N 83°37′56″W

Macon City Hall

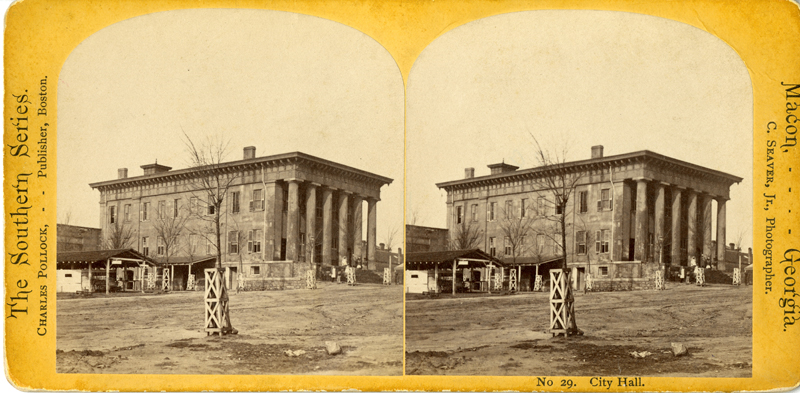
Macon City Hall c. 1876

Macon City Hall displayed on page 23 of Sholes' directory of Macon, 1880

Macon City Hall serves as the seat of government for the city of Macon, Georgia, in the United States. It is located in the downtown area, surrounded by Cotton Avenue, First Street, Poplar Street, and D.T. Walton, Sr. Way. It is located diagonally across the street from the Macon City Auditorium.

The Classical Revival structure was built in 1837 as the headquarters of the Monroe Railroad & Banking Co., before later serving as City Hall. During the American Civil War it was called into duty as a military hospital beginning in 1863. Its greatest notoriety came the next year, when Governor Joseph E. Brown, fleeing the Union army's advance into Milledgeville, moved the state capital to Macon and set up an office at City Hall, beginning November 18, 1864. The General Assembly met in the building the following February and March, the last legislative session under the Confederate States of America. The building ceased to serve as capitol on March 11, 1865.

Currently, City Hall houses Macon-Bibb County administrative offices, including that of the mayor and Commission, Finance Department, Code Enforcement, Human Resources, County Attorney and Clerk of Commission. Commission chambers are also located within the building. An eternal flame burns on the Poplar Street side of the building at the foot of the two grand staircases that flank the building's white-columned portico.
