= Central City Skatepark =

Coordinates: 32°49′53″N 83°36′51″W

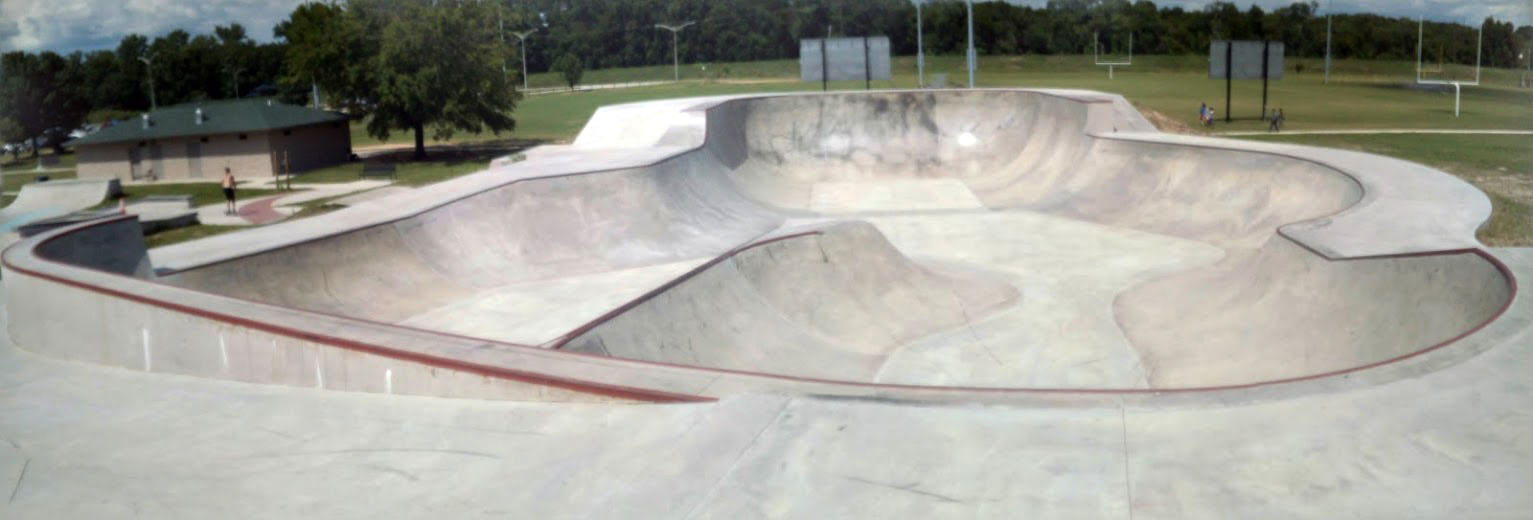
The concrete bowl at Central City Skatepark

Central City Skatepark is a free public skatepark located in downtown Macon, Georgia. The skatepark has a street section which opened in 2017 and a concrete bowl section which opened in 2019.
