= Bibb County Courthouse (Georgia) =

J. Taylor Phillips Bibb County Courthouse
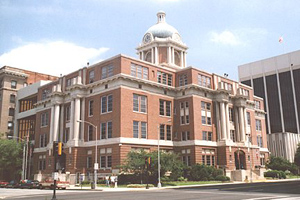
- The courthouse in 2007, seen from Mulberry St. looking roughly north.

General information
- Architectural style: Neoclassical Revival
- Address: 601 Mulberry St
- Town or city: Macon, Georgia
- Country: United States
- Coordinates: 32°50′19″N 83°37′40″W
- Completed: 1924

Design and construction
- Architect(s): Curran R. Ellis

The Bibb County Courthouse is in Macon, Georgia, United States. It was completed in 1924 and is Bibb County's fourth courthouse. It was designed by Curran R. Ellis. It houses the county's division of the state court system as well as various administrative offices. It is located in downtown Macon on the same street (two blocks west) as the William Augustus Bootle Federal Building and United States Courthouse.

In 2012, the courthouse was named for J. Taylor Phillips, State Court judge from 1964 to 2012; he served as a full-time judge until 1998 when he assumed part-time senior status. Before becoming a judge, Phillips served as a member of the Georgia House of Representatives from 1959 to 1962 and of the Georgia State Senate from 1963 to 1964. He served in the United States Marine Corps during World War II and the Korean War and graduated from the Walter F. George School of Law of Mercer University in 1955.
