= Macon, Georgia =

City in Georgia, United States

Macon
- Consolidated city-county
- Macon–Bibb County
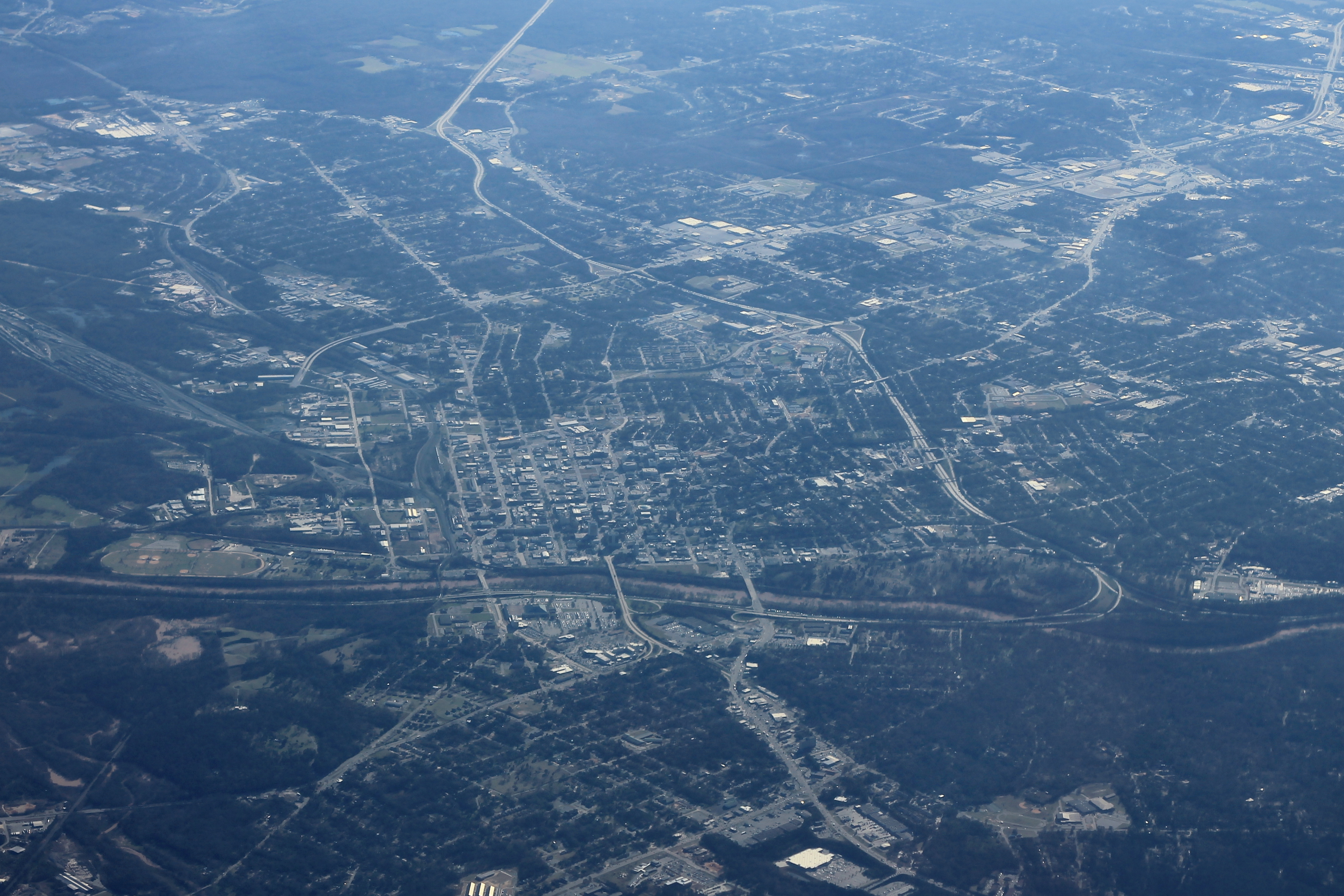
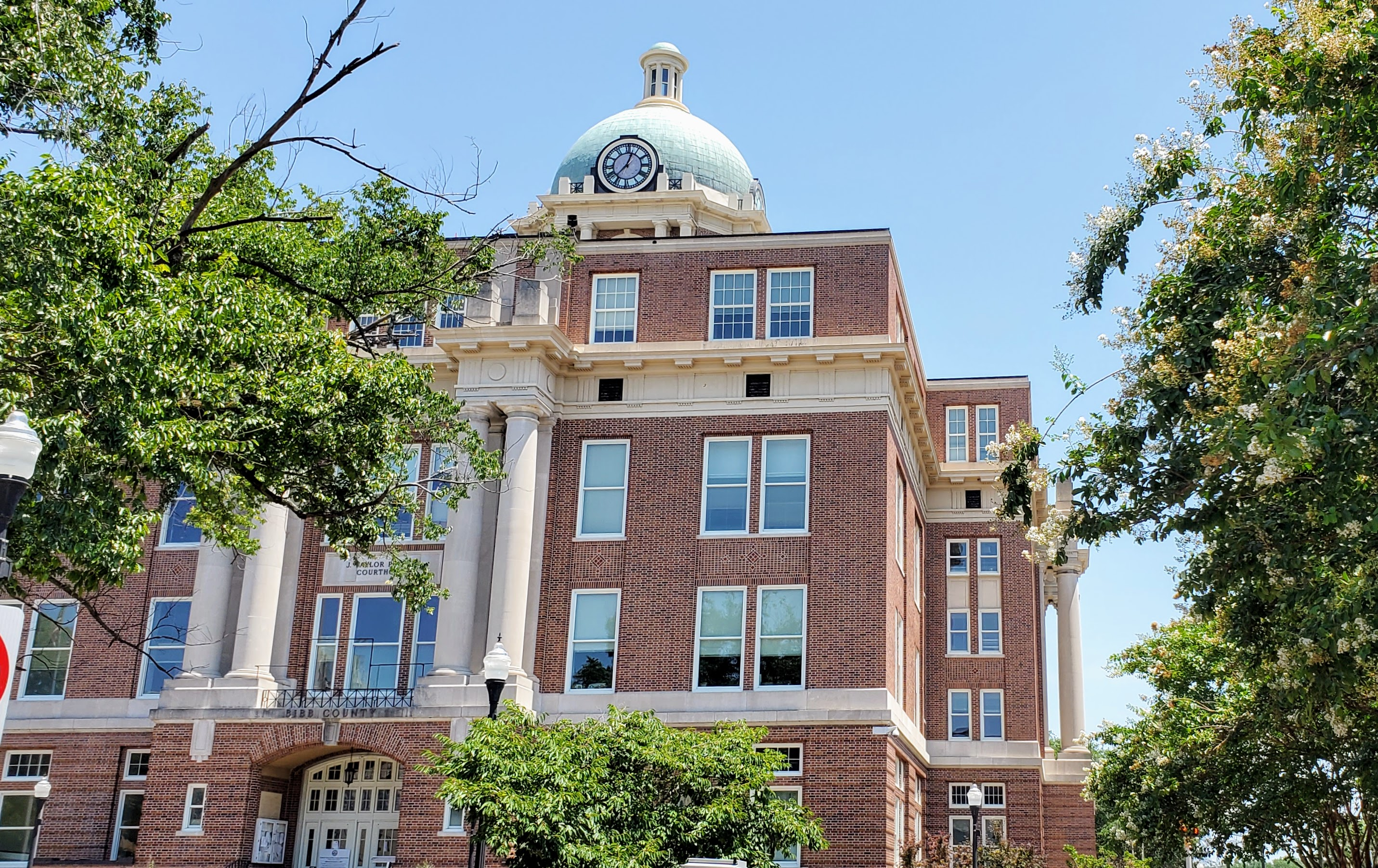
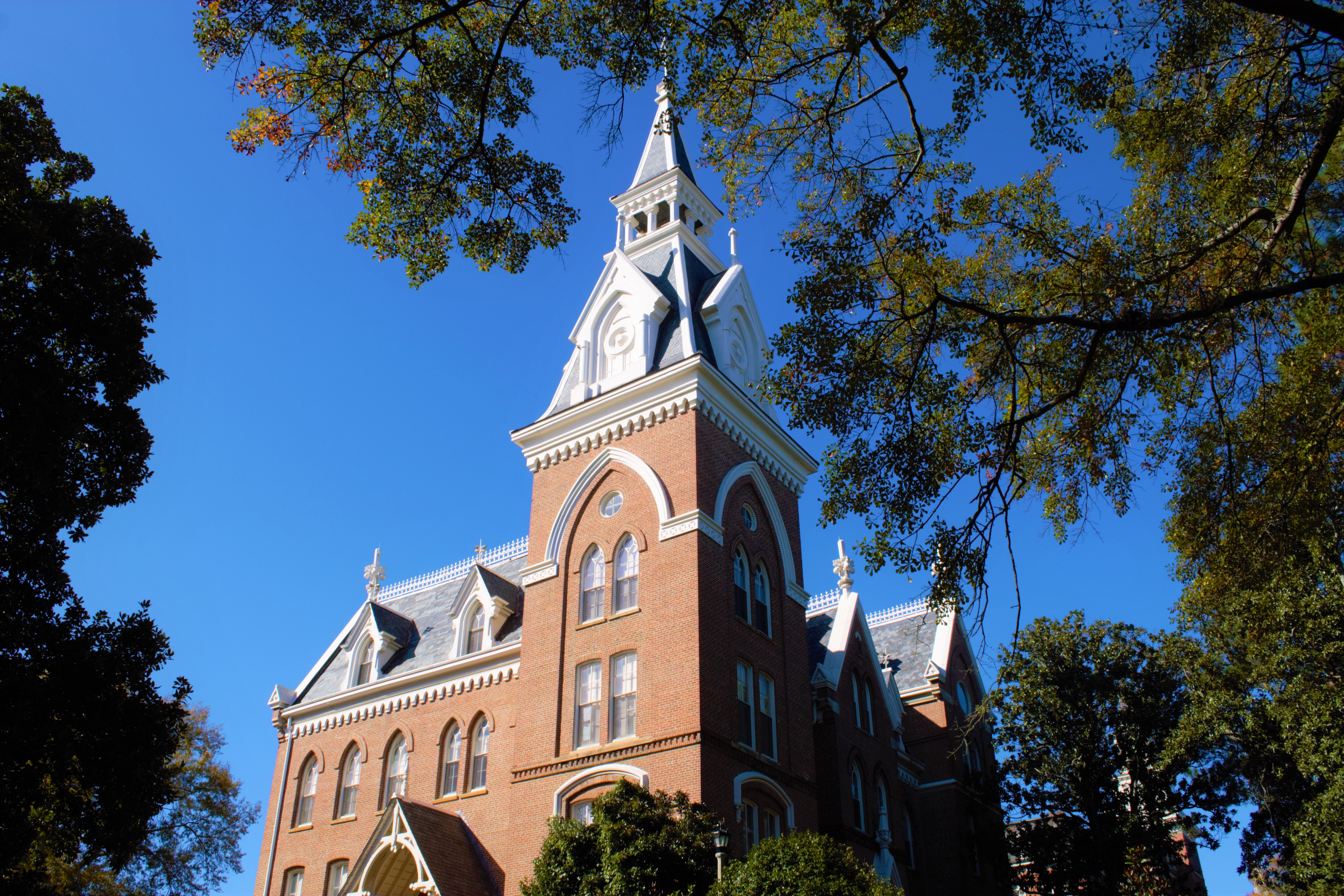
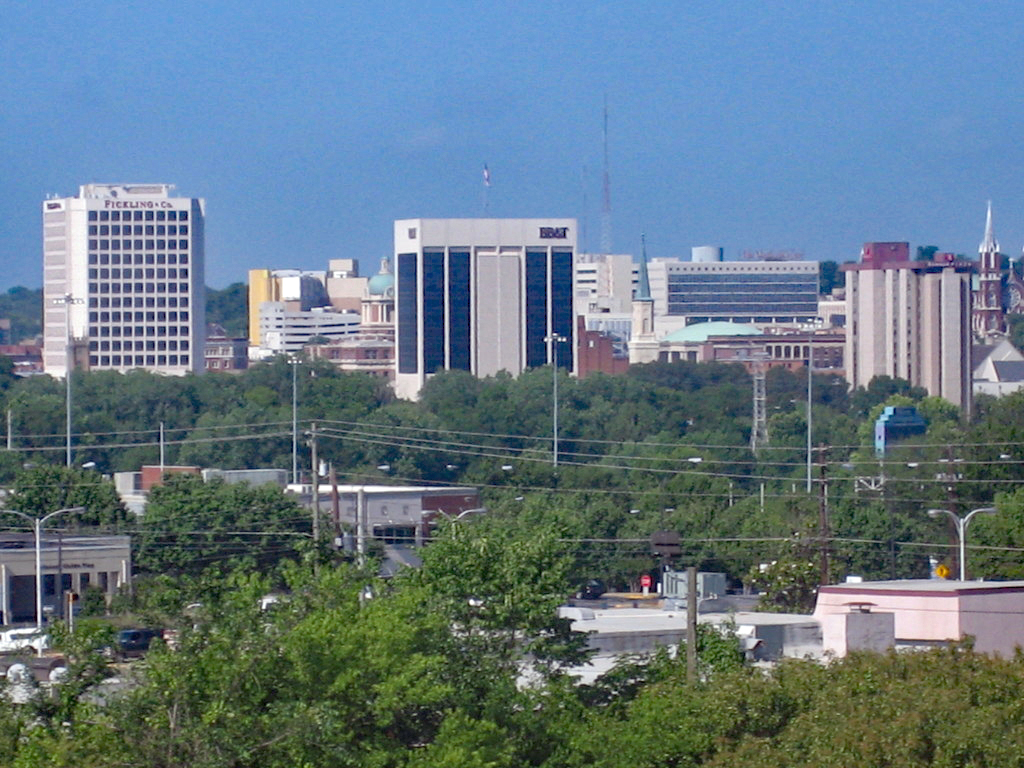
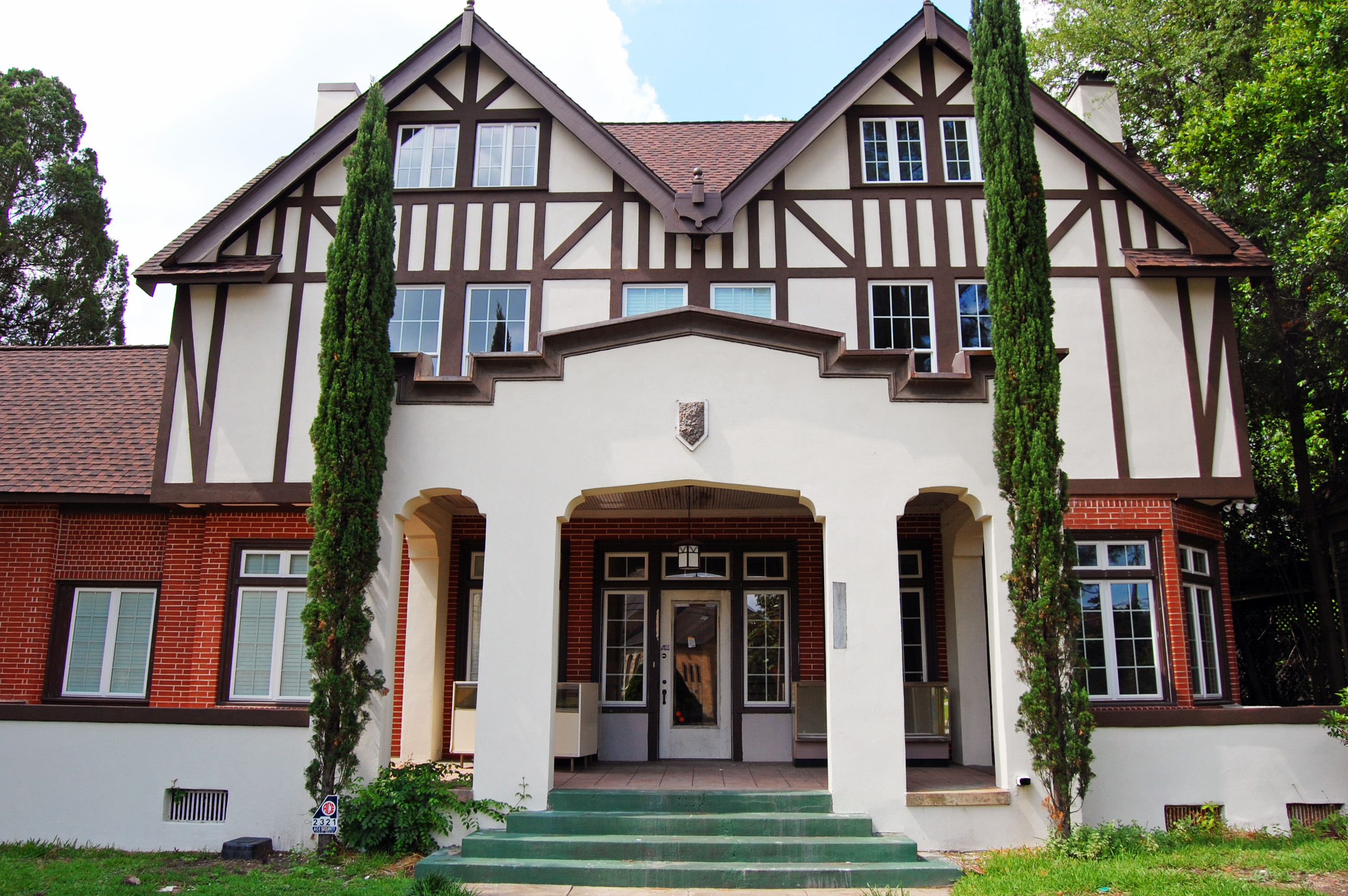
- Aerial photograph of Macon Bibb County Courthouse Mercer University Downtown Macon The Allman Brothers Band Museum

- Seal Wordmark

- Location within Georgia

- Location within Georgia Location within the United States
- Coordinates: 32°50′5″N 83°39′6″W
- Country: United States
- State: Georgia
- County: Bibb
- Settled around Fort Benjamin Hawkins: 1809; 217 years ago
- Named for: Nathaniel Macon

Government
  - Mayor: Lester Miller

Area
  - Consolidated city-county: 254.90 sq mi (660.19 km^{2})
  - Land: 249.38 sq mi (645.89 km^{2})
  - Water: 5.52 sq mi (14.30 km^{2})
- Elevation: 381 ft (116 m)

Population (2020)
  - Consolidated city-county: 157,346
  - Rank: 172nd in the U.S. 4th in Georgia
  - Density: 630.9/sq mi (243.61/km^{2})
  - Metro: 233,802 (197th)
- Time zone: UTC−5 (EST)
  - Summer (DST): UTC−4 (EDT)
- ZIP Codes: 31200–31299
- Area code: 478
- FIPS code: 13-49000
- GNIS feature ID: 0332301
- Website: maconbibb.us

Macon (/ˈmeɪkən/ MAY-kən), officially Macon–Bibb County, is a consolidated city-county in Georgia, United States. Situated near the fall line of the Ocmulgee River in Central Georgia, it is 85 miles (137 km) southeast of Atlanta and 165 miles (266 km) northwest of Savannah. Macon's population was 157,346 in the 2020 census. It is the principal city of the Macon metropolitan area, which had 234,802 people in 2020.

Macon was settled in the early 19th century. Voters approved the consolidation of the city of Macon and Bibb County governments in a 2012 referendum. Macon became the state's fourth-largest city (after Atlanta, Columbus, and Augusta) when the merger became official on January 1, 2014.

Macon has several notable cultural sites, including Ocmulgee Mounds National Historical Park, the Tubman Museum, and Hay House, and is known for the International Cherry Blossom Festival. The city is also known for its deep musical heritage and vibrant festivals that celebrate its Southern and African American roots. Higher education plays a major role through Mercer University, Middle Georgia State University, and Wesleyan College. Macon is served by I-16 (connecting to Savannah and Coastal Georgia), I-75 (connecting to Atlanta to the north and Valdosta to the south), and I-475. The area has two small general-aviation airports, Middle Georgia Regional Airport and Macon Downtown Airport.

== History ==
Macon was founded on the site of the Ocmulgee Old Fields, where the Creek Indians lived in the 18th century. Their predecessors, the Mississippian culture, built a powerful agriculture-based chiefdom (950–1100 AD). The Mississippian culture constructed earthwork mounds for ceremonial, religious, and burial purposes. Indigenous peoples inhabited the areas along the Southeast's rivers for 13,000 years before Europeans arrived.

Macon was developed at the site of Fort Benjamin Hawkins, built in 1809 at President Thomas Jefferson's direction after he forced the Creek to cede their lands east of the Ocmulgee River. (Archeological excavations in the 21st century found evidence of two separate fortifications.) The fort was named for Benjamin Hawkins, who served as superintendent of Indian Affairs for the Southeast territory south of the Ohio River for more than 20 years, had lived among the Creek, and was married to a Creek woman. Located at the fall line of the Ocmulgee River, the fort established a trading post with native peoples at the river's most inland point navigable from the Low Country.

Sholes' directory of the city of Macon, September 1, 1888

Fort Hawkins guarded the Lower Creek Pathway, an extensive and well-traveled American Indian network that the U.S. government later improved as the Federal Road, linking Washington, DC, to the ports of Mobile, Alabama, and New Orleans, Louisiana. Used for trading with the Creek, the fort also was used by state militia and federal troops. It was a major military distribution point during the War of 1812 and the Creek War of 1813. After the wars, it was a trading post and garrisoned troops until 1821. Decommissioned around 1828, it later burned to the ground. A replica of the southeast blockhouse, built in 1938, stands on an east Macon hill. Fort Hawkins Grammar School occupied part of the site. In the 21st century, archeological excavations have revealed more of the fort, increasing its historical significance, and led to further reconstruction planning for this major historical site.

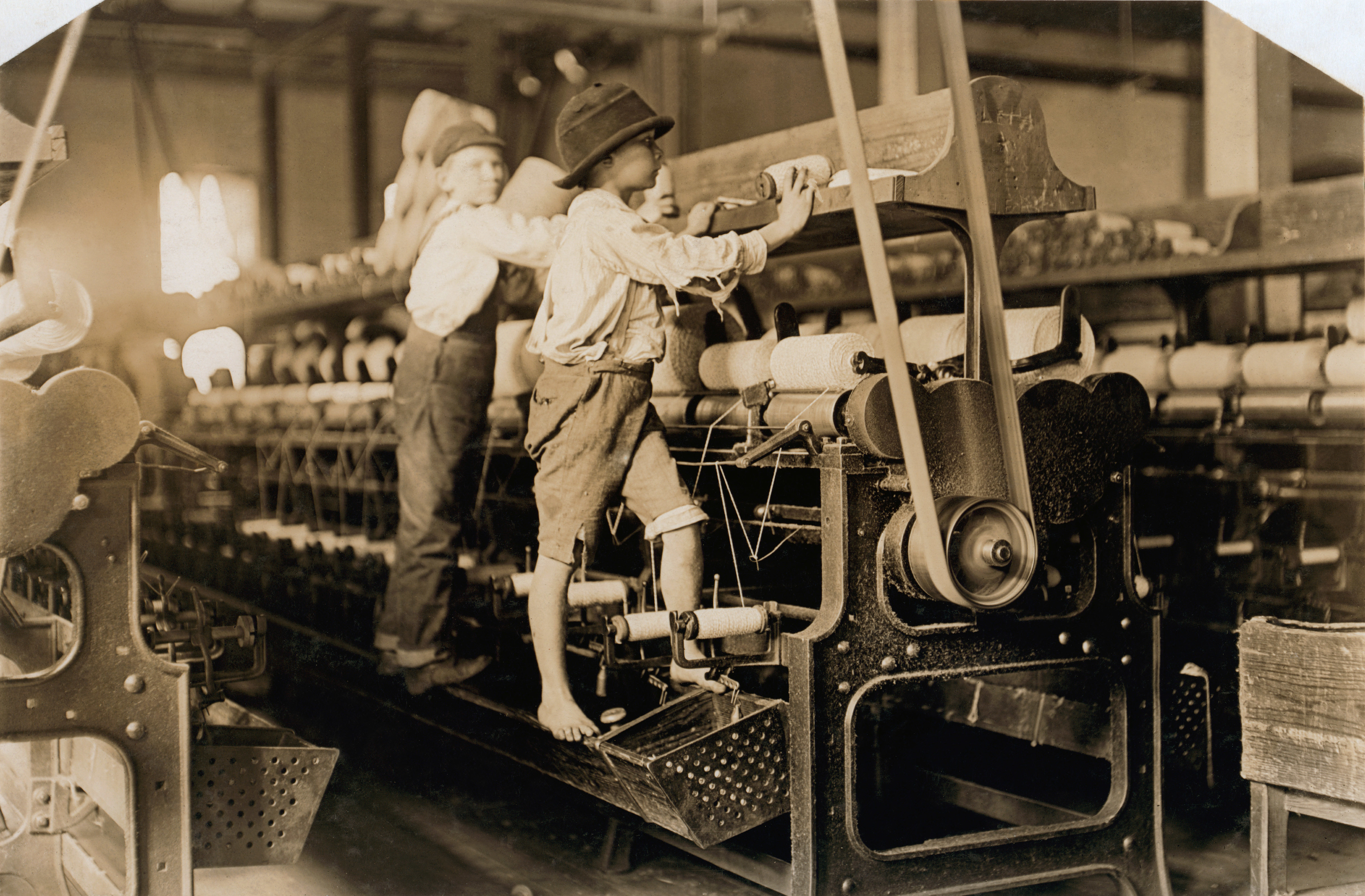
Child labor in Macon, 1909, photo by Lewis Hine

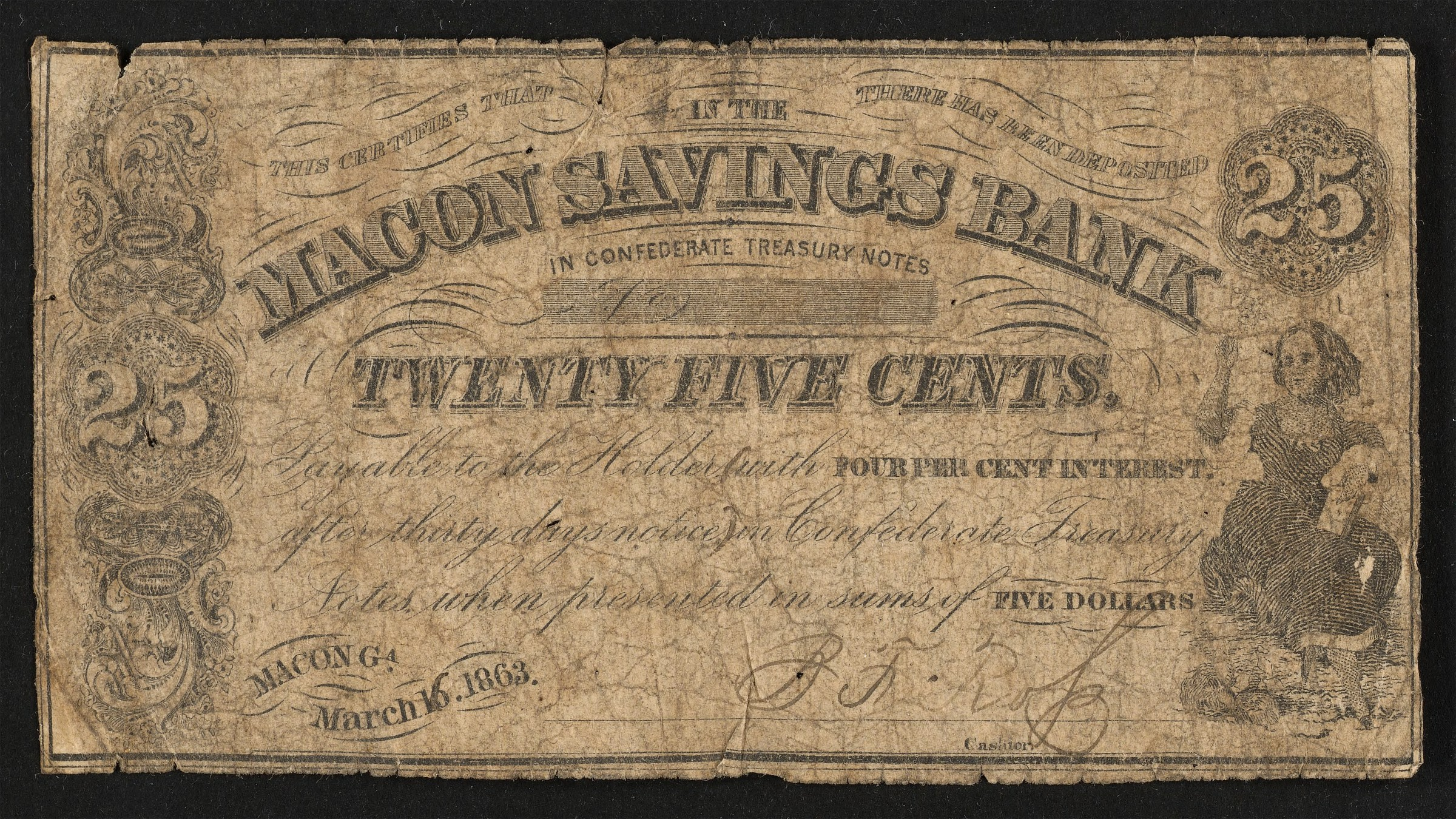
1863 twenty-five cent bill from Macon Savings Bank

With the arrival of more settlers, Fort Hawkins was renamed "Newtown". After Bibb County's organization in 1822, the city was chartered as the county seat in 1823 and officially named Macon, in honor of Nathaniel Macon, a statesman from North Carolina, from where many early Georgia residents hailed. City planners envisioned "a city within a park" and created a city of spacious streets and landscapes. Over 250 acres (1.0 km^{2}) were dedicated for Central City Park, and ordinances required residents to plant shade trees in their front yards.

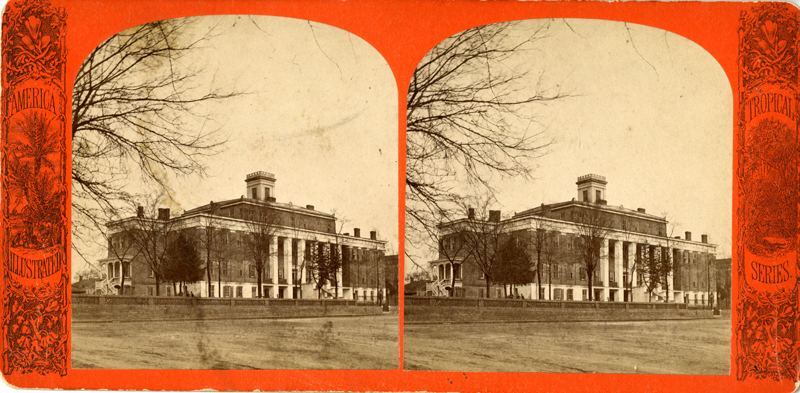
Wesleyan College c. 1877

Because of the beneficial local Black Belt geology and the availability of slave labor, cotton became the mainstay of Macon's early economy. The city's location on the Ocmulgee River aided initial economic expansion, providing shipping access to new markets. Cotton steamboats, stagecoaches, and the 1843 arrival of the railroad increased marketing opportunities and contributed to Macon's economic prosperity.

Macon's growth had other benefits. In 1836, the Georgia Conference of the Methodist Episcopal Church chose Macon as the location for Wesleyan College, the first U.S. college to grant women college degrees. Nonetheless, Macon came in last in the 1855 referendum voting to be Georgia's capital city with 3,802 votes.

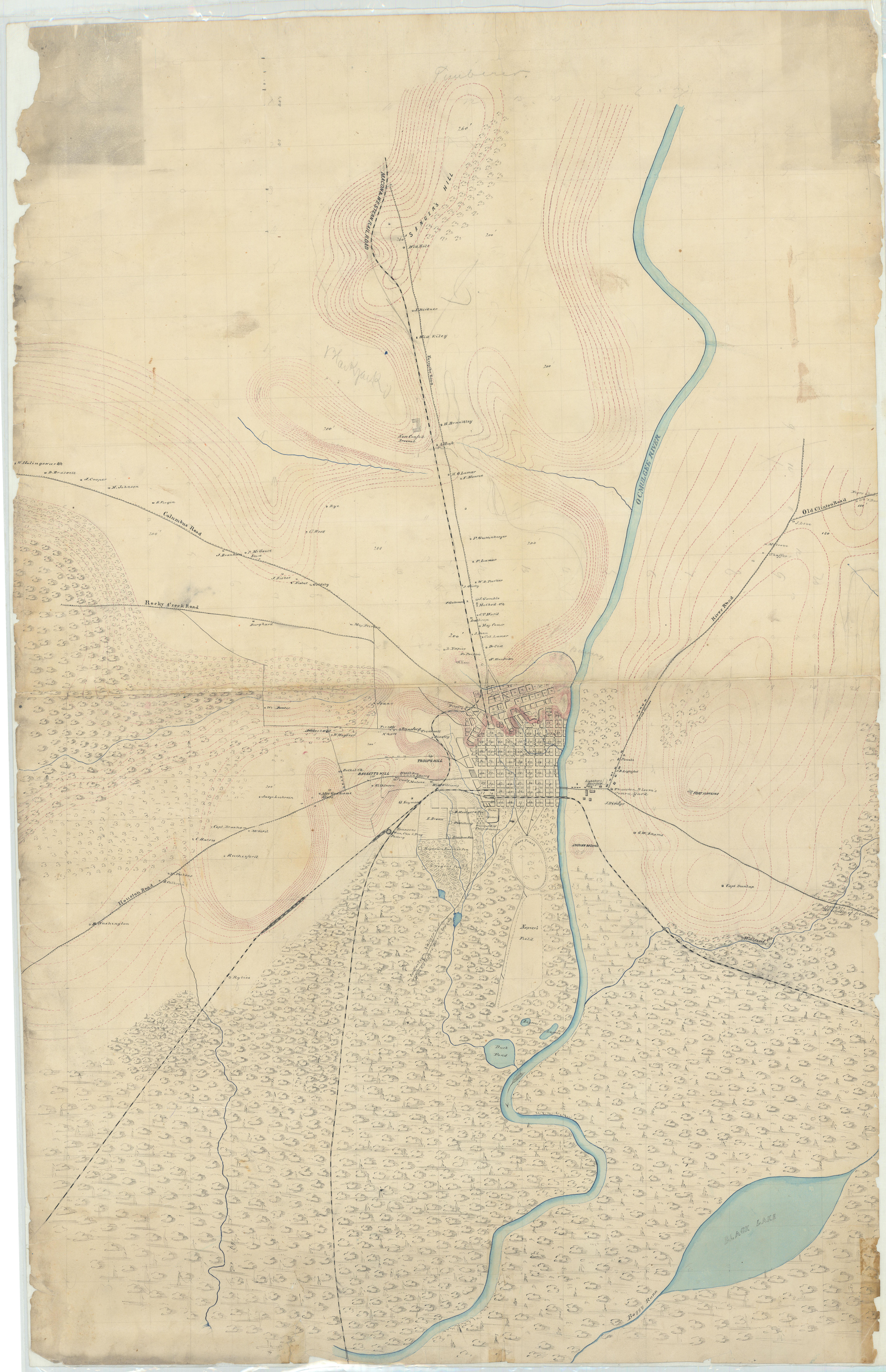
"Map of Macon and Vicinity" during the American Civil War, showing the Confederate arsenals, as well as Camp Oglethorpe and "Graveyard of Union Prisoners" (NAID 305649)

During the American Civil War, Macon served as the official arsenal of the Confederacy manufacturing percussion caps, friction primers, and pressed bullets. Camp Oglethorpe was established as a prison for captured Union officers and enlisted men. Later, it held only officers, at one time numbering 2,300. The camp was evacuated in 1864.

Macon City Hall served as the temporary state capitol in 1864 and was converted to a hospital for wounded Confederate soldiers. Union General William Tecumseh Sherman spared Macon on his march to the sea. His troops sacked the nearby state capital of Milledgeville, and Maconites prepared for an attack. Sherman, however, passed by without entering Macon.

The Macon Telegraph reported the city had furnished 23 companies of men for the Confederacy, but casualties were high. By the war's end, Maconite survivors fit for duty could fill only five companies.

The city was taken by Union forces during Wilson's Raid on April 20, 1865.

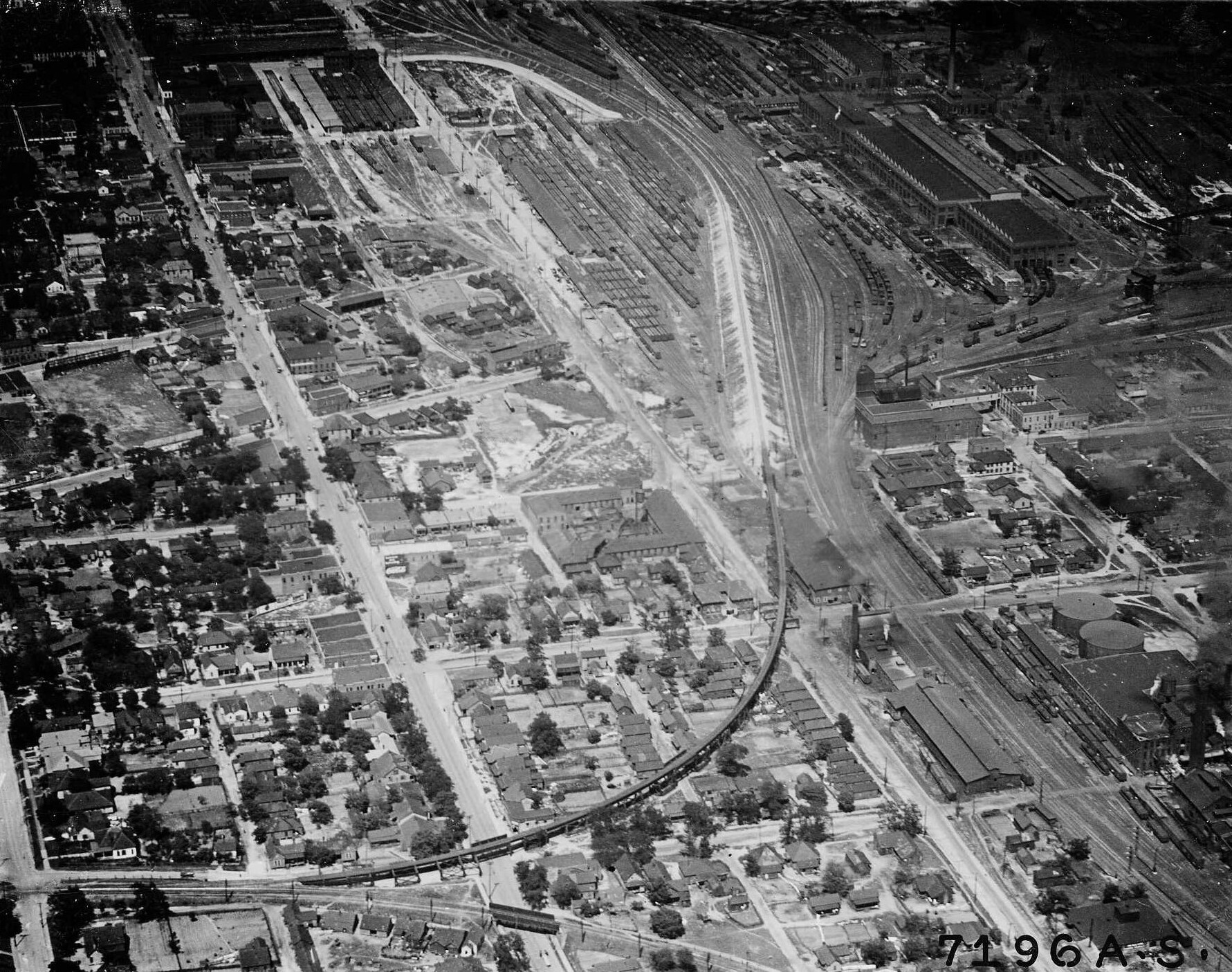
Railyards in Macon, 1943

Because of its central location, Macon developed as a state transportation hub. In 1895, The New York Times dubbed Macon "The Central City" because of its emergence as a railroad transportation and textile factory hub. Terminal Station was built in 1916. In the 20th century, Macon grew into a prospering town in Middle Georgia.

Downtown Macon in the early 1900s, looking northeast near the intersections of Cotton Avenue, First Street, and Poplar Street

Macon has been impacted by natural catastrophes. In 1994, Tropical Storm Alberto made landfall in Florida and flooded several Georgia cities. Macon, which received 24 inches (61 cm) of rain, suffered major flooding.

On May 11, 2008, an EF2 tornado hit Macon. Touching down in nearby Lizella, the tornado moved along the southern shore of Lake Tobesofkee, continued into Macon, and lifted in Twiggs County. The storm's total path length was 18 miles (29 km), and its path width was 100 yards (91 m). The tornado produced sporadic areas of major damage, with widespread straight-line wind damage to the south of its path. The most significant damage was along Eisenhower Parkway and Pio Nono Avenue in Macon, where two businesses were destroyed and several others were heavily damaged. The tornado also impacted Macon State College, where almost 50% of the campus's trees were snapped or uprooted and several buildings were damaged, most notably the gymnasium. The tornado's intensity varied from EF0 to EF2, with the EF2 damage and winds up to 130 miles per hour (210 km/h) occurring near the intersection of Eisenhower Parkway and Pio Nono Avenue.

=== Consolidation ===
Location of Macon within Bibb County before consolidation

On July 31, 2012, voters in Macon (57.8% approval) and Bibb County (56.7% approval) passed a referendum to merge the governments of the city of Macon and most of unincorporated Bibb County. The vote came after the Georgia General Assembly passed House Bill 1171, authorizing the referendum earlier in the year; Four previous consolidation attempts (in 1933, 1960, 1972, and 1976) failed.

As a result of the referendum, the Macon and Bibb County governments were replaced with a mayor and a nine-member county commission elected by districts, and a portion of Macon extending into nearby Jones County was disincorporated. Robert Reichert was elected the first mayor of Macon-Bibb in the September 2013 election, which required a runoff with C. Jack Ellis in October.

== Geography ==
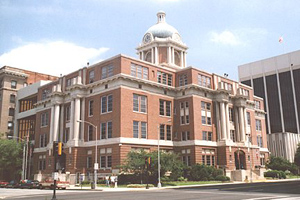
The Macon-Bibb County Courthouse

The Ocmulgee River is a major river that runs through the city. Macon is one of Georgia's three major fall line cities, along with Augusta and Columbus. The fall line is where the hills of the Piedmont plateau meet the flat terrain of the coastal plain. As such, Macon has a varied landscape of rolling hills on the north side and flat plains on the south. The fall line, where the elevation drops noticeably, causes rivers and creeks in the area to flow rapidly toward the ocean. In the past, Macon and other Fall Line cities had many textile mills powered by the rivers.

Macon is located at 32°50′05″N 83°39′06″W (32.834839, −83.651672). According to the United States Census Bureau, the city has a total area of 56.3 square miles (146 km^{2}), of which 0.5 sq mi (1.3 km^{2}) (0.82%) is covered by water. Macon is about 330 ft (100 m) above mean sea level.

=== Climate ===
Macon has a humid subtropical climate (Köppen climate classification Cfa). The normal monthly mean temperatures range from 46.3 °F (7.9 °C) in January to 81.8 °F (27.7 °C) in July. On average, 1–3 days have 100 °F (38 °C)+ highs, (Note: The record number of triple-digit (Fahrenheit) readings is 24 in 1954.) and 83 days have 90 °F (32 °C)+ highs, (Note: The historical range is 31 in 1994 to 116 in 2011.) and 41 days with a low at or below freezing; the average window for freezing temperatures is October 18 thru April 19, allowing a growing season of 182 days.

The city has an average annual precipitation of 45.7 inches (1,160 mm). The wettest day on record was July 5, 1994, with 10.25 in (260 mm) of rain, and the wettest month on record was July 1994, with 18.16 in (461 mm) of rain. Since 1892, though, when precipitation records for the city began, two months, October 1961 and October 1963, did not even record a trace of precipitation in the city, and two other months, October 1939 and May 2007, only recorded a trace. Snow is occasional, with about half of the winters receiving trace amounts or no snowfall, averaging 0.7 in (1.8 cm); the snowiest winter was 1972–73 with 16.5 in (42 cm).

Climate data for Macon, Georgia (Middle Georgia Regional Airport), 1991–2020 normals, (Note: Mean monthly maxima and minima (i.e. the highest and lowest temperature readings during an entire month or year) calculated based on data at said location from 1991 to 2020.) extremes 1892–present (Note: Official records for Macon were kept at downtown from October 1892 to 7 April 1899, the Weather Bureau from 8 April 1899 to November 1948, and at Middle Georgia Regional Airport since December 1948. For more information, see ThreadEx.)
Month	Jan	Feb	Mar	Apr	May	Jun	Jul	Aug	Sep	Oct	Nov	Dec	Year
Record high °F (°C)	84 (29)	85 (29)	92 (33)	96 (36)	100 (38)	108 (42)	108 (42)	105 (41)	105 (41)	103 (39)	88 (31)	83 (28)	108 (42)
Mean maximum °F (°C)	73.9 (23.3)	76.8 (24.9)	83.9 (28.8)	88.0 (31.1)	93.6 (34.2)	97.5 (36.4)	99.1 (37.3)	98.7 (37.1)	95.1 (35.1)	88.9 (31.6)	81.8 (27.7)	75.9 (24.4)	100.3 (37.9)
Mean daily maximum °F (°C)	59.3 (15.2)	63.4 (17.4)	70.6 (21.4)	77.9 (25.5)	85.8 (29.9)	90.9 (32.7)	93.5 (34.2)	92.2 (33.4)	87.6 (30.9)	78.9 (26.1)	69.1 (20.6)	61.3 (16.3)	77.5 (25.3)
Daily mean °F (°C)	47.6 (8.7)	51.2 (10.7)	57.7 (14.3)	64.5 (18.1)	72.9 (22.7)	79.5 (26.4)	82.5 (28.1)	81.4 (27.4)	76.2 (24.6)	66.0 (18.9)	55.8 (13.2)	49.5 (9.7)	65.4 (18.6)
Mean daily minimum °F (°C)	35.9 (2.2)	39.1 (3.9)	44.9 (7.2)	51.0 (10.6)	60.0 (15.6)	68.1 (20.1)	71.5 (21.9)	70.7 (21.5)	64.8 (18.2)	53.2 (11.8)	42.5 (5.8)	37.8 (3.2)	53.3 (11.8)
Mean minimum °F (°C)	19.0 (−7.2)	22.4 (−5.3)	27.2 (−2.7)	34.8 (1.6)	45.0 (7.2)	58.3 (14.6)	64.8 (18.2)	62.1 (16.7)	51.1 (10.6)	35.6 (2.0)	26.5 (−3.1)	22.8 (−5.1)	17.0 (−8.3)
Record low °F (°C)	−6 (−21)	8 (−13)	14 (−10)	28 (−2)	40 (4)	46 (8)	54 (12)	55 (13)	35 (2)	26 (−3)	10 (−12)	5 (−15)	−6 (−21)
Average precipitation inches (mm)	4.32 (110)	4.17 (106)	4.31 (109)	3.62 (92)	2.65 (67)	4.44 (113)	4.79 (122)	4.38 (111)	3.66 (93)	2.63 (67)	3.37 (86)	4.57 (116)	46.91 (1,192)
Average snowfall inches (cm)	0.4 (1.0)	0.0 (0.0)	0.2 (0.51)	0.0 (0.0)	0.0 (0.0)	0.0 (0.0)	0.0 (0.0)	0.0 (0.0)	0.0 (0.0)	0.0 (0.0)	0.0 (0.0)	0.1 (0.25)	0.7 (1.8)
Average precipitation days (≥ 0.01 in)	10.2	9.2	9.4	8.2	7.5	11.2	11.3	10.2	7.1	6.3	7.7	9.4	107.7
Average snowy days (≥ 0.1 in)	0.3	0.2	0.1	0.0	0.0	0.0	0.0	0.0	0.0	0.0	0.0	0.1	0.7
Average relative humidity (%)	70.2	67.2	66.6	64.8	68.5	70.7	74.2	76.1	76.4	71.2	71.1	70.9	70.7
Mean monthly sunshine hours	179.5	192.2	250.8	283.2	315.3	300.0	293.9	288.0	247.4	253.7	200.2	182.2	2,986.4
Percentage possible sunshine	56	62	67	73	73	70	67	70	67	72	64	59	67
Source: NOAA (snow 1981–2010, relative humidity and sun 1961–1990)

=== Surrounding cities and towns ===
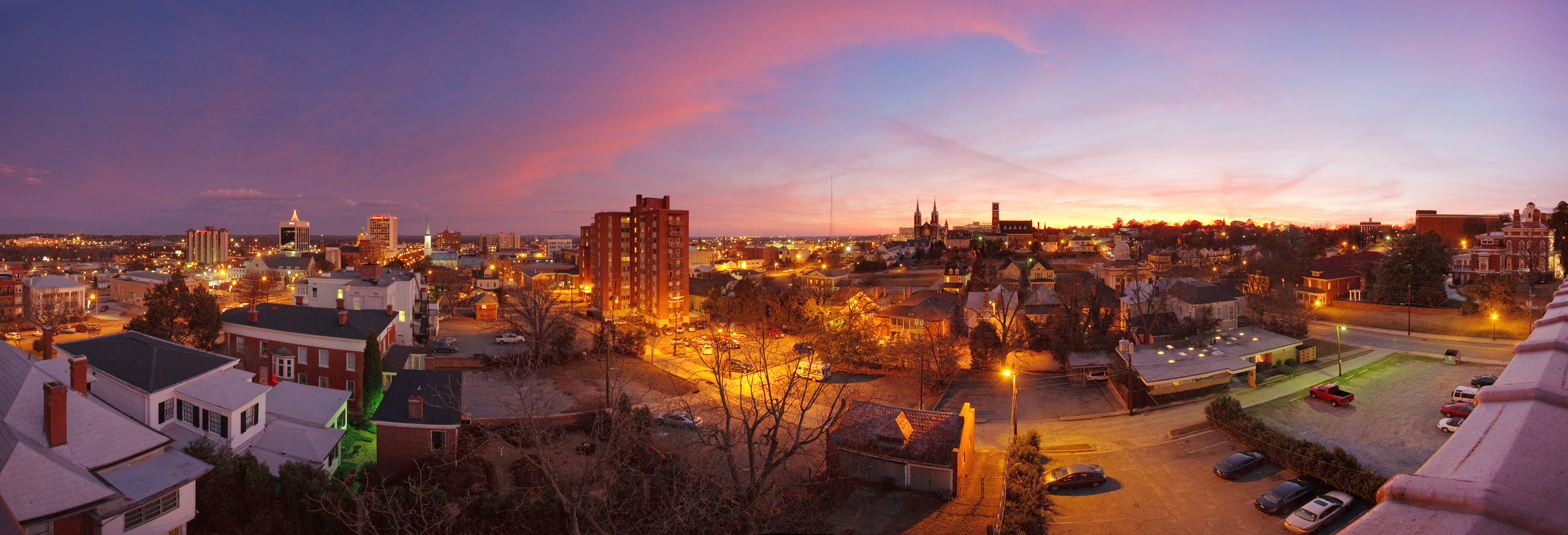
Downtown Macon at night in 2008

== Demographics ==
Location of the Macon-Warner Robins-Fort Valley CSA and its components: Macon Metropolitan Statistical Area Warner Robins Metropolitan Statistical Area

Historical population
Census	Pop.	Note	%±
1840	3,297		—
1850	5,720		73.5%
1860	8,247		44.2%
1870	10,810		31.1%
1880	12,749		17.9%
1890	22,746		78.4%
1900	23,272		2.3%
1910	40,665		74.7%
1920	52,995		30.3%
1930	53,829		1.6%
1940	57,865		7.5%
1950	70,252		21.4%
1960	69,764		−0.7%
1970	122,423		75.5%
1980	116,896		−4.5%
1990	106,612		−8.8%
2000	97,255		−8.8%
2010	91,351		−6.1%
2020	157,346		72.2%
2025 (est.)	157,556	▲	0.1%
U.S. Decennial Census; 1850–1870 1870–1880; 1890–1910 1920–1930; 1940 1950 1960; 1970 1980 1990; 2000 2010 2020; 2025

Macon is the largest principal city in the Macon-Warner Robins-Fort Valley CSA, a combined statistical area that includes the Macon metropolitan area (Bibb, Crawford, Jones, Monroe, and Twiggs counties) and the Warner Robins metropolitan area (Houston, Peach, and Pulaski counties) with a combined population of 411,898 in the 2010 census.

Macon-Bibb County, Georgia – racial and ethnic composition Note: the US Census treats Hispanic/Latino as an ethnic category. This table excludes Latinos from the racial categories and assigns them to a separate category. Hispanics/Latinos may be of any race.
Race / ethnicity (NH = Non-Hispanic)	Pop 2000	Pop 2010	Pop 2020	% 2000	% 2010	% 2020
White alone (NH)	34,050	25,296	56,787	35.01%	27.69%	36.09%
Black or African American alone (NH)	60,503	61,768	85,234	62.21%	67.62%	54.17%
Native American or Alaska Native alone (NH)	177	146	281	0.18%	0.16%	0.18%
Asian alone (NH)	608	683	3,209	0.63%	0.75%	2.04%
Native Hawaiian or Pacific Islander alone (NH)	27	28	42	0.03%	0.03%	0.03%
Other race alone (NH)	60	97	602	0.06%	0.11%	0.38%
Multiracial (NH)	664	1,069	4,454	0.68%	1.17%	2.83%
Hispanic or Latino (any race)	1,166	2,264	6,737	1.20%	2.48%	4.28%
Total	97,255	91,351	157,346	100.00%	100.00%	100.00%

As of the official 2010 U.S. census, the population of Macon was 91,351. In the last official census, in 2000, 97,255 people, 38,444 households, and 24,219 families were residing in the city. The population density was 1,742.8 inhabitants per square mile (672.9/km^{2}). The 44,341 housing units had an average density of 794.6 per square mile (306.8/km^{2}). The racial makeup of the city was 67.94% African American, 28.56% White, 0.02% Native American, 0.65% Asian, 0.03% Pacific Islander, 0.46% from other races, and 0.77% from two or more races. Hispanics or Latinos of any race were 2.48% of the population. By the 2020 census, its population increased to 157,346.

Of the 38,444 households in 2000, 30.1% had children under 18 living with them, 33.0% were married couples living together, 25.7% had a female householder with no husband present, and 37.0% were not families. About 31.7% of all households were made up of individuals, and 12.1% had someone living alone who was 65 or older. The average household size was 2.44 and the average family size was 3.08.

In the city, the age distribution was 26.9% under 18, 11.3% from 18 to 24, 27.5% from 25 to 44, 20.0% from 45 to 64, and 14.3% who were 65 or older. The median age was 34 years. For every 100 females, there were 79.7 males. For every 100 females 18 and over, there were 72.8 males.

== Crime ==
Since 2020, crime has become a higher concern in the city. In 2022, Macon set a homicide record, with 70. In 2023, Macon had the highest crime rate in Georgia: 52.6 crimes per 1,000 residents. Gang activity is a major reason for the crime problem in Macon. The Georgia Bureau of Investigation expanded its Gang Task Force Office to Macon in 2023. In 2024, Macon-Bibb County saw a decrease in homicides, with 39 reported compared to 40 in 2023 and 71 in 2022.

== Economy ==
The aerospace, advanced manufacturing, food processing, healthcare, professional services, and warehouse and distribution industries drive the economy in Macon-Bibb County. Long-standing large private employers include Mercer University, GEICO's Southeast Corporate Headquarters, YKK USA, and Norfolk Southern Railway's Brosnan Yard.

The decline of the textile industry in the South, along with the shuttering of other large manufacturing operations, such as the closing of the Brown and Williamson plant in 2006, caused a decline in the city's economy in the 2000s. In recent years, the city has successfully landed numerous new employers to diversify the economy, such as Irving Consumer Products and Kuhmo Tire manufacturing plants, as well as multiple aerospace employers at the Middle Georgia Regional Airport, including an Embraer aircraft maintenance facility.

The health-care and social-assistance sector is the largest industry in Macon by number of employees, with the Atrium Health Navicent and Piedmont Healthcare Macon hospital systems, two of the city's largest employers, making Macon the healthcare hub for the Middle and South Georgia regions.

President Donald Trump announced a $4.2 billion investment by German automaker Audi in the city in October 2026 with the new manufacturing plant producing 200,000 vehicles annually. The facility, Audi's first U.S. manufacturing plant, is expected to create approximately 4,500 jobs and produce premium SUVs for the North American market, according to Georgia officials.

=== Personal income ===
The 2010 Census listed Macon's median household income as $28,366, below the state average of $49,347. The median family income was $37,268. Full-time working males had a median income of $34,163, higher than the $28,082 for females. The city's per capita income was $17,010. About 24.1% of families and 30.6% of the population were below the poverty line, including 43.6% of those under 18 and 18.4% of those over 65.

=== Retail ===
Malls include The Shoppes at River Crossing, Macon Mall, and Eisenhower Crossing. Traditional shopping centers are in the downtown area and Ingleside Village.

=== Military ===
Macon is the headquarters of the 48th Infantry Brigade Combat Team, Georgia Army National Guard. The largest single-site industrial complex in Georgia, Robins Air Force Base, is 10 miles (16 km) south of Macon on Highway 247, just east of Warner Robins.

== Arts and culture ==
=== Musical heritage ===
Macon has been home for numerous musicians and composers, including Emmett Miller, The Allman Brothers Band, Randy Crawford, Mark Heard, Lucille Hegamin, Ben Johnston, Otis Redding, Little Richard, Mike Mills, and Bill Berry of R.E.M., as well as more recent artists like violinist Robert McDuffie and country artist Jason Aldean. Capricorn Records, run by Macon natives Phil Walden and briefly Alan Walden, made the city a Southern rock music production center in the late 1960s and 1970s.

The Macon Symphony Orchestra, a youth symphony, and the Middle Georgia Concert Band perform at the Grand Opera House in downtown Macon.

The Georgia Music Hall of Fame was located in Macon from 1996 to 2011.

=== Festivals ===
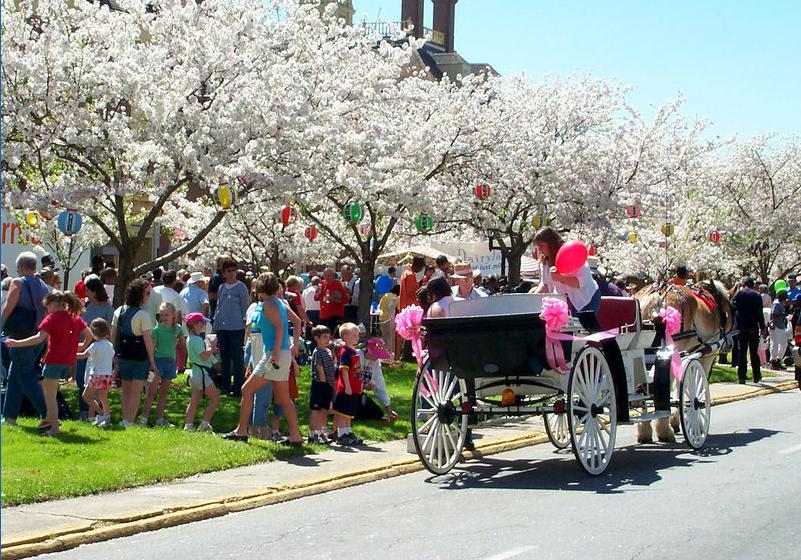
Cherry Blossom Festival

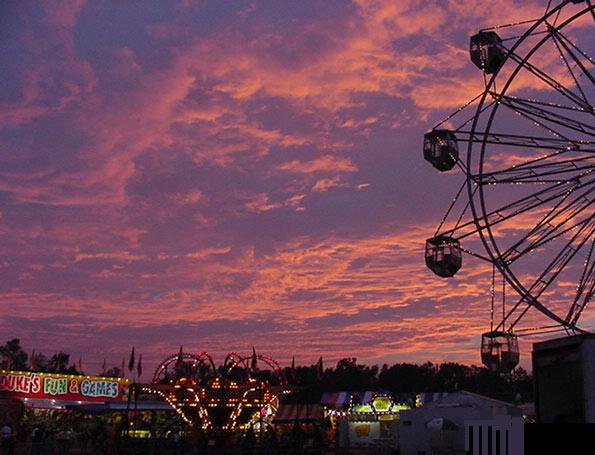
Georgia State Fair

- International Cherry Blossom Festival, a 10-day celebration, is held every mid-March in Macon.
- The Mulberry Street Festival, an arts and crafts festival, is held downtown the last weekend of March.
- The Juneteenth Freedom Festival is an annual June performing-arts and educational celebration of the end of American slavery in 1865, celebrating black freedom and heritage both ancient and contemporary.
- Pan African Festival, an annual celebration of the African diaspora and culture, is held in April.
- Ocmulgee Indigenous Celebration, a celebration of the original residents of the land where Macon now sits, is held every third weekend in September at Ocmulgee Mounds National Historical Park. Representatives from the Cherokee, Chickasaw, Choctaw, Creek, Seminole, and other nations come to share stories, exhibit Native art, and perform traditional songs and dance.
- Skydog is a music festival celebrating the birthday, life, and music of Skydog (Duane Allman) held in November.
- The Georgia Music Hall of Fame hosts Georgia Music Week in September.
- Macon's annual Bragg Jam festival features an Art and Kids' Festival along the Ocmulgee Heritage Trail and a nighttime pub crawl.
- Macon Film Festival is an annual celebration of independent films, held the third weekend in July.

=== Points of interest ===
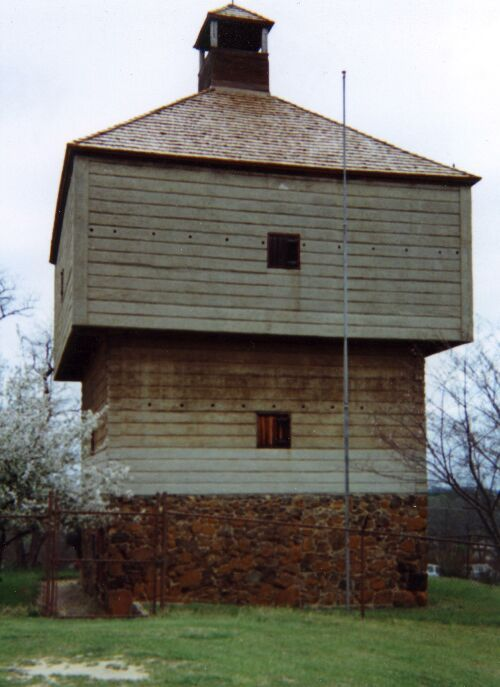
Fort Benjamin Hawkins

==== Historical sites ====
- Terminal Station, a railroad station built in 1916, is located on 5th St. at the end of Cherry St. Its architect was Alfred Fellheimer, prominent for his 1903 design of Grand Central Terminal in New York City.
- Ocmulgee Mounds National Historical Park is located near downtown Macon. It preserves some of Georgia's largest ancient earthwork mounds built by the Mississippian culture a millennium ago, c. 950–1150. It was sacred to the historic Muscogee (Creek Nation) as well. Archeological artifacts reveal 13,000 years of human habitation at the site. The park features a spiral mound, funeral mound, temple mounds, burial mounds, and a reconstructed earth lodge. It is the first Traditional Cultural Property designated by the National Park Service east of the Mississippi River.
- Fort Benjamin Hawkins, a major military outpost (1806–1821), was a command headquarters for the U.S. Army and Georgia militia on the boundary between U.S.-held and Native land, as well as a trading post or factory for the Creek Nation. It was a supply depot during U.S. campaigns of the War of 1812 and the Creek and Seminole Wars.
- Cannonball House, a historic home on the National Register of Historic Places
- Luther Williams Field
- Old City Cemetery, one of Macon's oldest cemeteries
- Rose Hill Cemetery, a cemetery listed on the National Register of Historic Places
- Sidney Lanier Cottage, the poet's historic home
- Temple Beth Israel, a domed Neoclassical built in 1902 to house Macon's Jewish congregation, founded in 1859
- Wesleyan College, the first chartered women's college in the world

==== Museums ====
- The Allman Brothers Band Museum – the "Big House" used by the Allman Brothers Band in the early 1970s, now a museum of Allman Brothers history and artifacts
- The Georgia Children's Museum – interactive education, located in the downtown Museum District
- Georgia Sports Hall of Fame
- The Little Richard House and Museum – a museum of Little Richard's history and artifacts
- Museum of Arts and Sciences and Planetarium
- Tubman Museum of African American Art, History, and Culture – the largest African American museum in the Southeast

==== Community ====
- City Hall, Georgia's capital for part of the Civil War

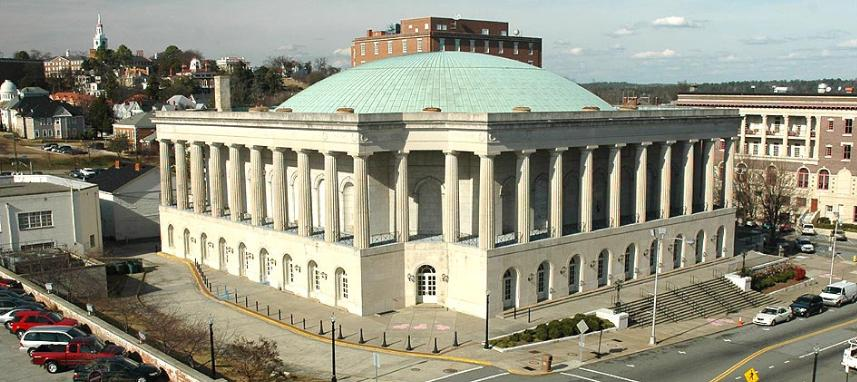
Macon City Auditorium – featuring the world's largest true copper dome

- Douglass Theatre, named for its founder Charles Henry Douglass. An entrepreneur from a prominent black family, he was an established theatre developer well versed in the vaudeville and entertainment business. The theatre has undergone modern renovations and hosts numerous theatrical events.
- The Grand Opera House, where the Macon Symphony Orchestra performs
- Hay House – also known as the "Johnston-Felton-Hay House", it has been referred to as the "Palace of the South"
- City Auditorium, the world's largest true copper dome
- Macon Coliseum
- Macon Little Theatre, established in 1934, is the area's oldest community theatre, producing seven plays/musicals per season
- Waddell Barnes Botanical Gardens
- Theatre Macon, in the old Ritz Theatre; they perform around nine shows a year

== Sports ==
Macon is home to the Mercer Bears, with NCAA Division I teams in soccer (men's and women's), football, baseball, basketball (men's and women's), tennis, and lacrosse. Central Georgia Technical College competes in men's and women's basketball. Wesleyan College, a women's school, has basketball, soccer, cross country, tennis, softball, and volleyball teams.

Club	Sport	League	Venue
Macon Bacon	Baseball	Coastal Plain League	Luther Williams Field
Macon Mayhem	Ice hockey	SPHL	Macon Coliseum

=== Former teams ===
Club	Sport	League	Venue	Active
Macon State College Blue Storm	Various	NCCAA	Various	2009–2013
Macon Central City/Hornets	Baseball	Southern League	Central City Park	1892–1894
Macon Highlanders/Brigands/Peaches/Tigers	Baseball	South Atlantic League	Central City Park and Luther Williams Field	1904–1917, 1923–1930
Macon Peaches/Dodgers/Redbirds/Pirates	Baseball	Southeastern League (1932), South Atlantic League (1936–42, 1946–60, 1962–63, 1980–87), Southern Association (1961), Southern League (1964, 1966–67)	Luther Williams Field	1932, 1936–1942, 1946–1960, 1961–1964, 1966–1967, 1980–1982
Macon Braves	Baseball	South Atlantic League	Luther Williams Field	1991–2002
Macon Peaches	Baseball	Southeastern League	Luther Williams Field	2003
Macon Music	Baseball	South Coast League	Luther Williams Field	2007
Macon Pinetoppers	Baseball	Peach State League	Luther Williams Field	2010
Macon Blaze	Basketball	World Basketball Association	Macon Coliseum	2005
Macon Whoopees	Ice hockey	Southern Hockey League	Macon Coliseum	1974
Macon Whoopee	Ice hockey	Central Hockey League (1996–2001), ECHL (2001–02)	Macon Coliseum	1996–2002
Macon Trax	Ice hockey	Atlantic Coast Hockey League (2002–03), World Hockey Association 2 (2003–04), Southern Professional Hockey League (2004–05)	Macon Coliseum	2002–2005
Macon Knights	Arena football	af2	Macon Coliseum	2001–2006
Macon Steel	Indoor football	American Indoor Football	Macon Coliseum	2012
Georgia Doom	Indoor football	American Arena League	Macon Coliseum	2018–2019
Middle Georgia United	Soccer	UPSL	Cavalier Fields	2021-2021

== Parks and recreation ==
The city maintains several parks and community centers.

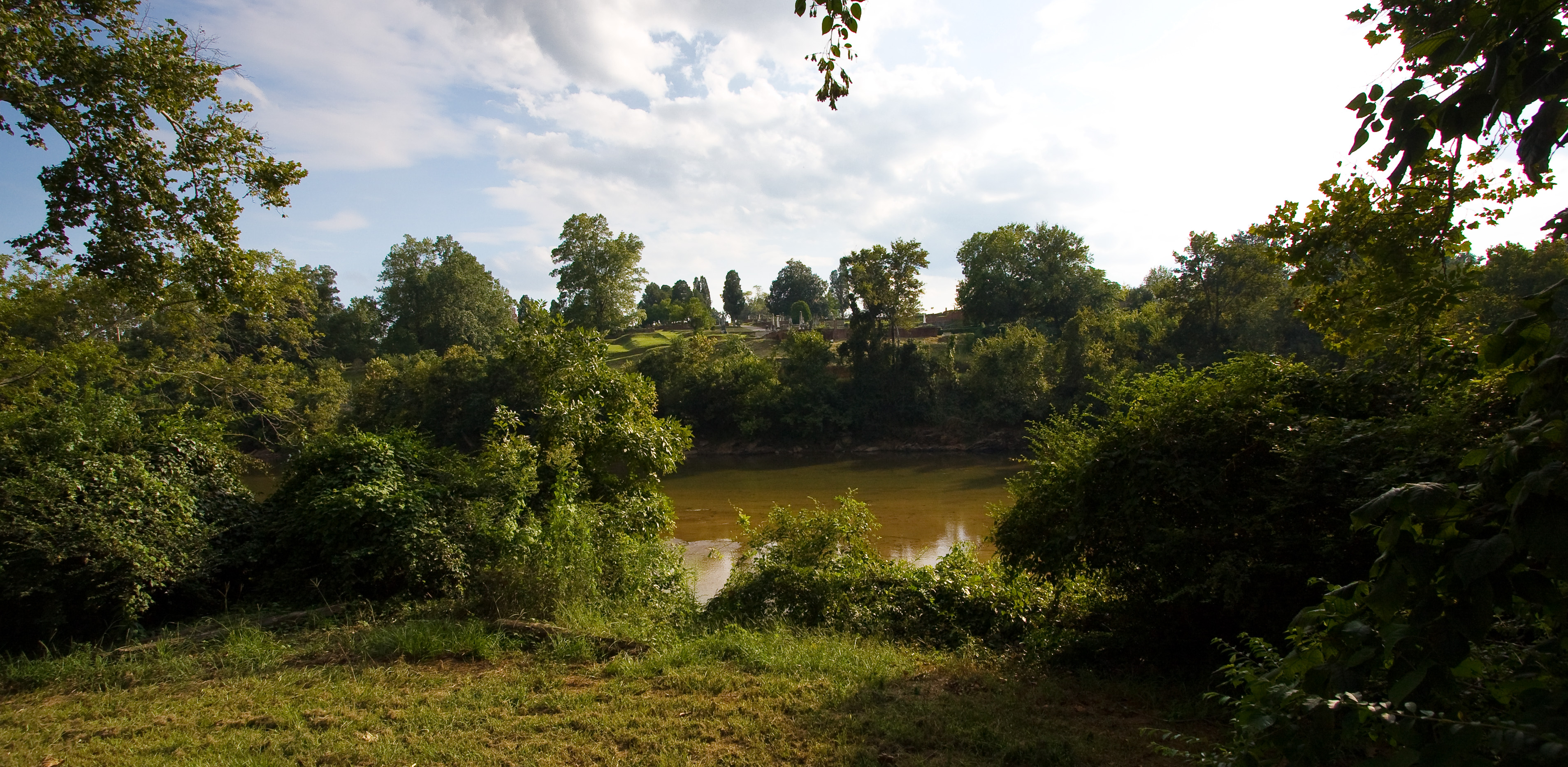
Ocmulgee Riverwalk

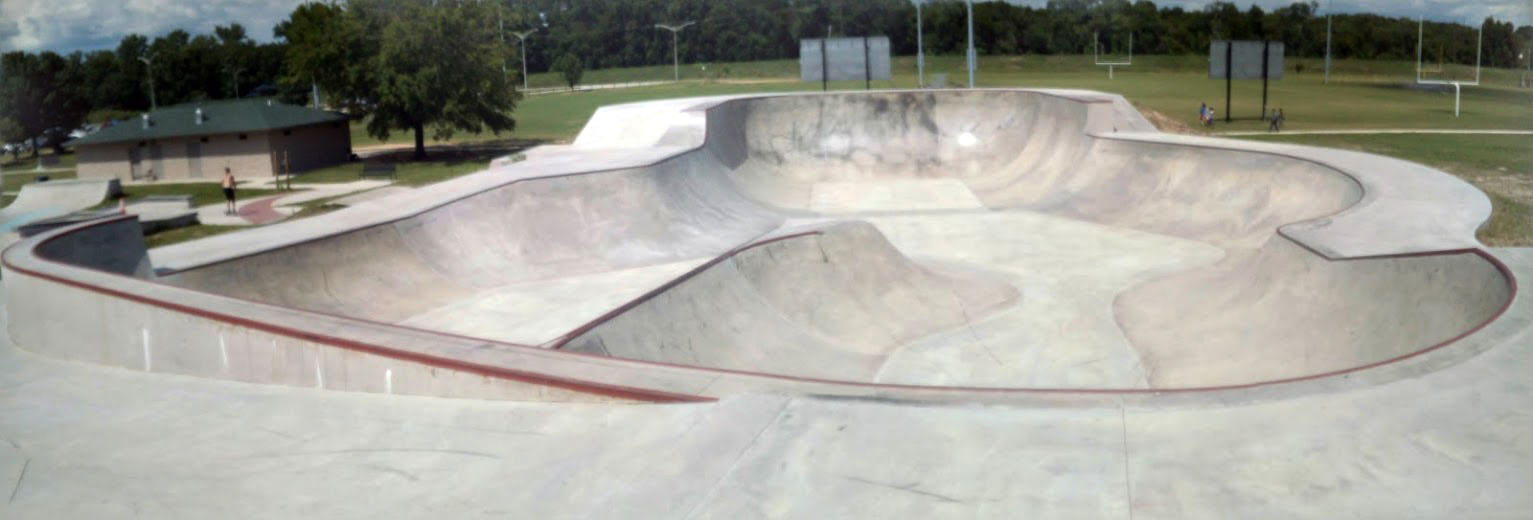
Central City Skatepark

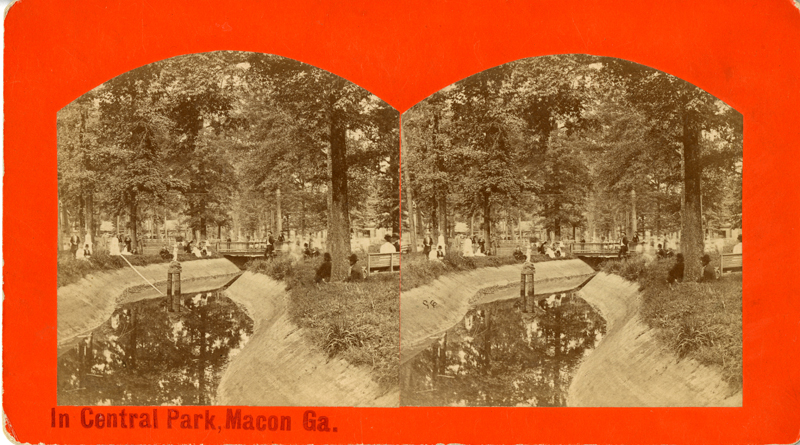
Central City Park, 1877

- Ocmulgee Heritage Trail – a green way of parks, plazas, and landmarks along the Ocmulgee River in downtown Macon
- Amerson River Park
- Bloomfield Park
- East Macon Park
- Frank Johnson Recreation Center
- Freedom Park
- L.H. Williams Community School Center
- Memorial Park
- North Macon Park
- Rosa Jackson
- Senior Center
- John Drew Smith Tennis Center
- Tattnall Square Tennis Center
- Charles H. Jones Gateway Park
- Carolyn Crayton Park (formerly Central City Park)
- Central City Skatepark

=== Baconsfield Park ===
U.S. Senator Augustus Bacon, of Georgia, in his 1911 will, devised land in Macon in trust, to be used as a public park for the exclusive benefit of white people. The park, known as Baconsfield, was operated in that manner for many years. In Evans v. Newton, the Supreme Court of the United States held that the park could not continue to be operated on a racially discriminatory basis. The Supreme Court of Georgia thereupon declared "that the sole purpose for which the trust was created has become impossible of accomplishment" and remanded the case to the trial court, which held Cy-près doctrine to be inapplicable, since the park's segregated character was an essential and inseparable part of Bacon's plan. The trial court ruled that the trust failed and that the property reverted to Bacon's heirs. The Supreme Court of Georgia and the U.S. Supreme Court affirmed. The 50-acre (20 ha) park was lost and commercially developed.

== Government ==
Macon City Hall

Prior to 2013, the city government consisted of a mayor and city council. Robert Reichert was elected the first mayor of the consolidated Macon-Bibb County in October 2013. There are also 9 County Commissioners elected from districts within the county.

On March 15, 2019, the U.S. Securities and Exchange Commission charged the former County Manager, Dale M. Walker, with fraud.

== Education ==
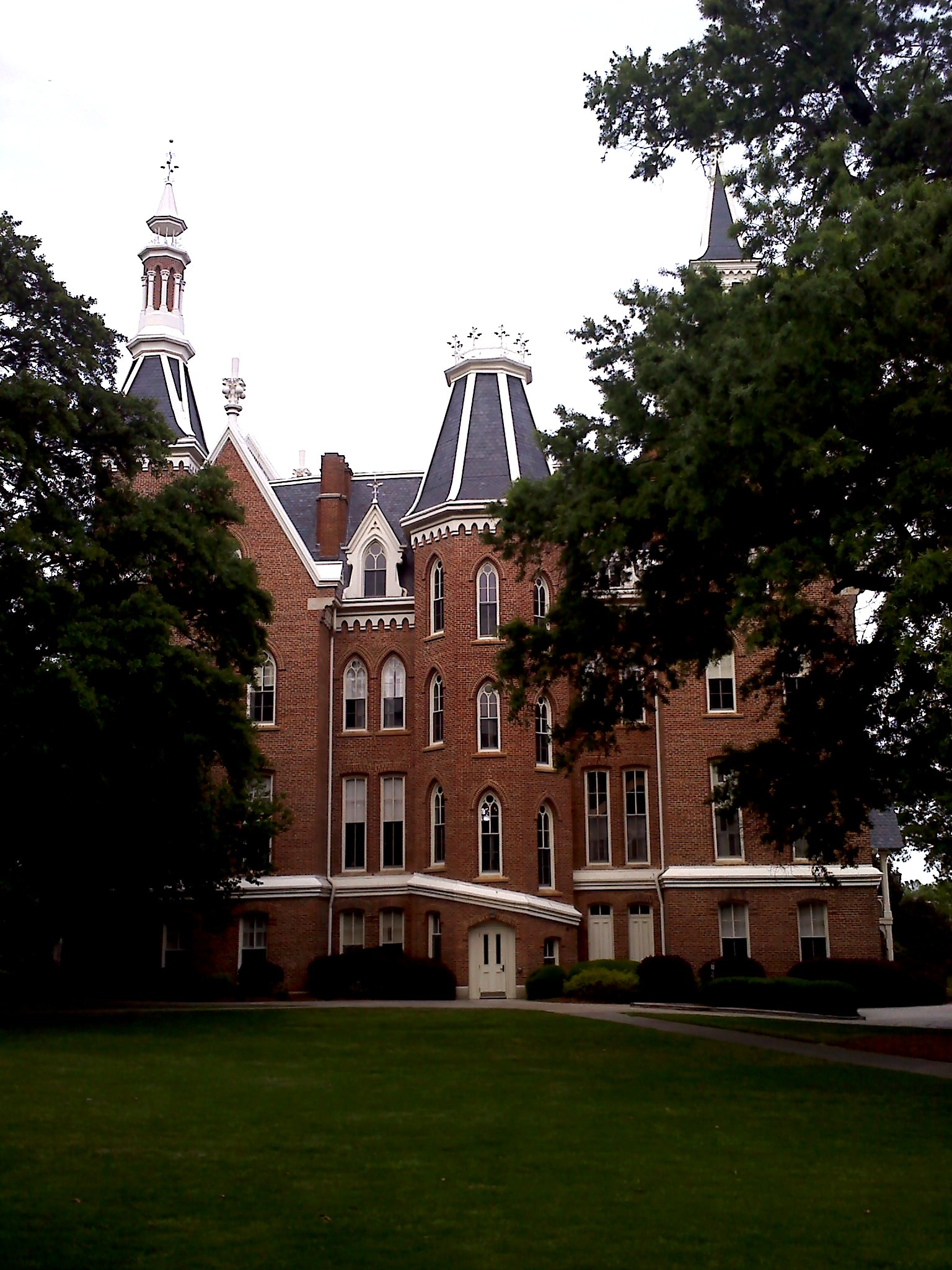
Mercer University

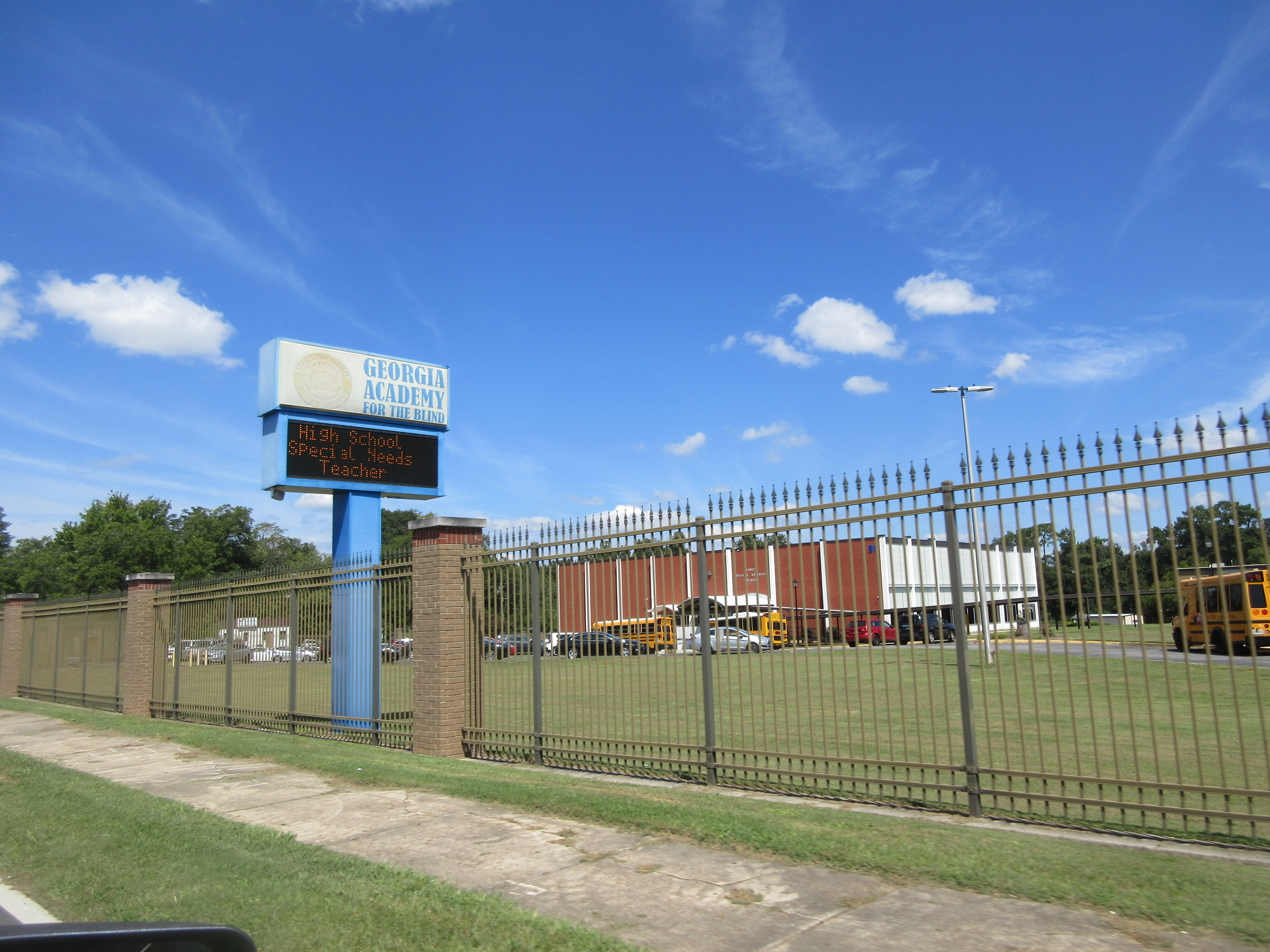
Georgia Academy for the Blind

=== Public schools ===
Bibb County Public School District operates district public schools.

Public high schools include:

- Central High School
- Howard High School
- Northeast Health Science Magnet High School
- Rutland High School
- Southwest Magnet High School and Law Academy
- Westside High School

Also operated by Bibb County Public Schools:

- Elam Alexander Academy
- Northwoods Academy

Georgia Academy for the Blind, operated by the state of Georgia, is a statewide school for blind students.

State public charter schools

- The Academy for Classical Education
- Cirrus Academy Charter School

=== Private schools ===
Macon is home to several private high schools, many of which were established as segregation academies for parents wishing to avoid the desegregation of private schools, with the exception of Mount de Sales Academy.

- Covenant Academy
- First Presbyterian Day School
- Mount de Sales Academy
- Stratford Academy
- Tattnall Square Academy
- Windsor Academy

=== Colleges and universities ===
Approximately 30,000 college students live in the greater Macon area.

- Central Georgia Technical College
- Mercer University
- Middle Georgia State University
- Miller-Motte Technical College – satellite campus
- Wesleyan College

== Media ==
Macon has a substantial number of local television and radio stations. It is also served by two local papers.

=== Newspapers and magazines ===
- The 11th Hour
- Gateway Macon (web portal), The Local's Guide for Things To Do in Macon
- Macon Business Journal, a journal chronicling the business community in the Middle Georgia region
- Macon Community News, a monthly positive news print newspaper
- The Mercer Cluster
- The Telegraph, a daily newspaper published in Macon

== References in popular culture ==
=== The Simpsons ===
In "Bart on the Road", a season-seven episode of The Simpsons, character Nelson Muntz suggests the boys take a road trip to Macon. Later, he reminds the group that none of their troubles would have happened had they chosen Macon over Knoxville, Tennessee.

=== Gone with the Wind ===
In Margaret Mitchell's novel Gone with the Wind, Aunt Pittypat's coachman, Uncle Peter, protected her when she fled to Macon during Sherman's assault on Atlanta.

=== Telltale's The Walking Dead ===
The city of Macon is visited in The Walking Dead episodic adventure game by Telltale Games and its standalone DLC 400 Days.

In Season One, the city is portrayed as a small rural town and is visited by the main characters as they temporarily set up camp in the city. The city is the hometown of the game's main protagonist and the playable character throughout the game, Lee Everett. He and the other survivors barricade themselves inside his family's pharmacy as they are besieged by zombies. After one of the survivors dies, the group heads to a motel on the outskirts of Macon, where they set up camp for two more episodes, before eventually deciding to leave the city for Savannah.

In 400 Days, the city is briefly shown in the episode "Vince's Story" as a flashback to when the episode's main character, Vince, fatally shoots an unseen and unnamed resident of the city before fleeing into the night before the apocalypse began. This murder would ultimately lead to Vince's arrest and the events that occurred at the beginning of the zombie apocalypse.

=== "Walkin' Back to Georgia" ===
In Jim Croce's "Walkin' Back to Georgia" on his album You Don't Mess Around with Jim, he mentions Macon in the lyric "But she's the girl who said she loved me on that hot dusty Macon road."

== Infrastructure ==
=== Hospitals ===
- The Medical Center, Navicent Health (a part of Atrium Health)
- Atrium Health Navicent Beverly Knight Olson Children's Hospital (formerly The Children's Hospital Of Central Georgia)
- Piedmont Health Macon (formerly Coliseum Medical Centers)
  - Piedmont Macon Medical Center
  - Piedmont Macon North Hospital
- The American Red Cross of Central Georgia
- Central Georgia Rehabilitation Hospital

=== Transportation ===
==== Airports ====
- Macon Downtown Airport is located near downtown. It has a large number of corporate and private aviation aircraft.
- Middle Georgia Regional Airport provides public air service to Macon as well as cargo flights. The airport is situated 9 mi (14 km) south of downtown.

==== Highways ====
Interstates:

- I-16
- I-75
- I-475
- I-14 (proposed)

U.S. Routes:

- US 23
- US 41
- US 80
- US 129

State Routes:

- SR 11
- SR 19
- SR 22
- SR 49
- SR 74
- SR 87
- SR 87 Connector
- SR 247
- SR 401 (unsigned designation for I-75)
- SR 404 (unsigned designation for I-16)
- SR 408 (unsigned designation for I-475)
- SR 540 (Fall Line Freeway)

==== Mass transit ====
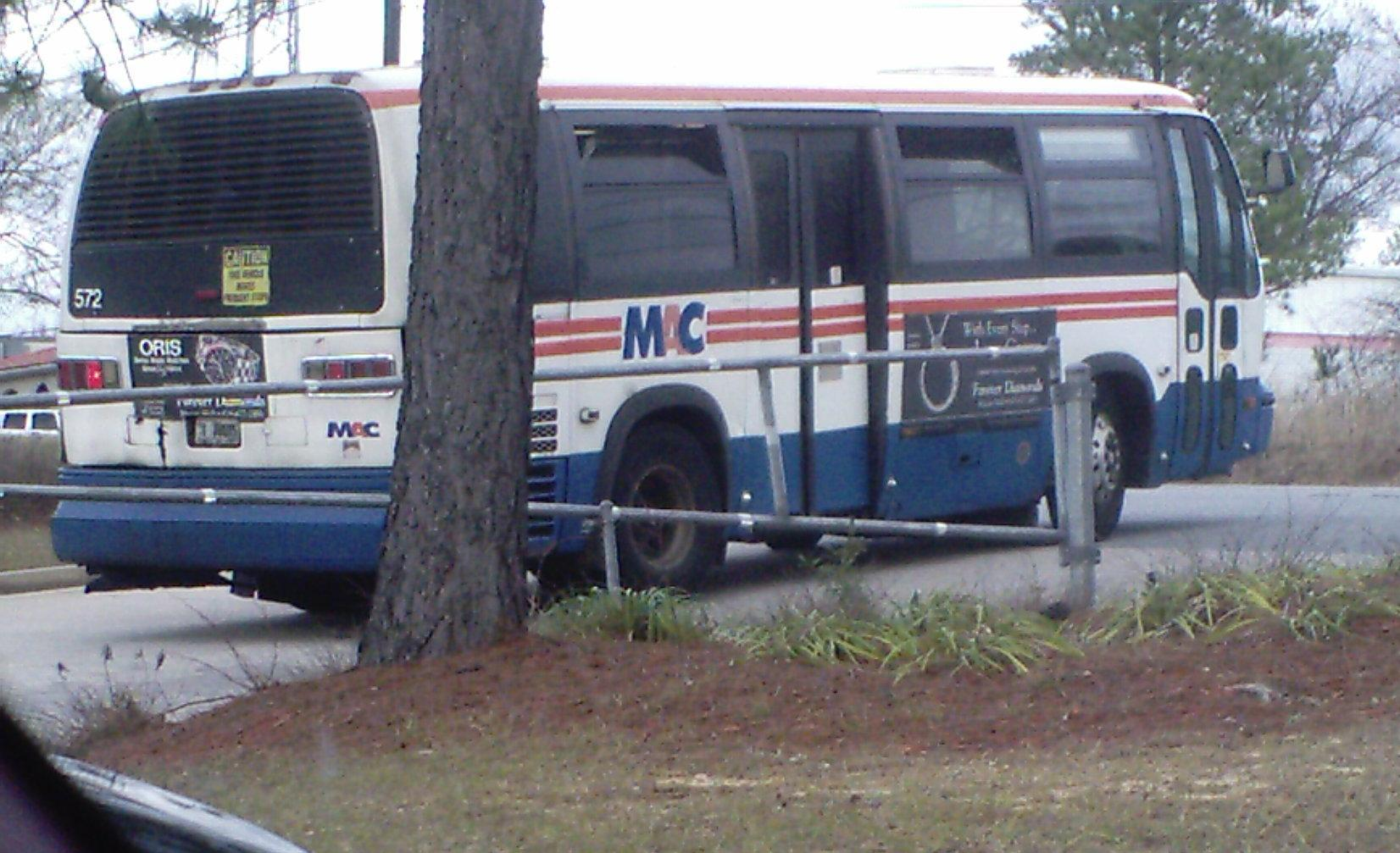
MTA-MAC city bus

The Macon Transit Authority (MTA) is Macon's public-transit system, operating the public transit city bus system throughout Macon-Bibb County. As of 2022, the MTA has a total of 10 city bus routes, operating out of the Terminal Station hub.

==== Intercity bus and rail ====
Greyhound Lines provides intercity bus service. In 2019, the company moved from a stand-alone bus station to the Terminal Station to be in the same hub as the local mass transit buses.

Macon grew as a center of rail transport after the 1846 opening of the Macon and Western Railroad. Two of the most note-worthy train companies operating through the city were the Central of Georgia Railway and the Southern Railway. The city continued to be served by passenger trains at Terminal Station until 1971. The Frisco Railroad's Kansas City–Florida Special served the city until 1964. The Southern's Royal Palm ran from Cincinnati, through Macon, to Miami, Florida until 1966. (A truncated route served to Valdosta, Georgia, until 1970.) The Central of Georgia's Nancy Hanks ran through Macon, from Atlanta to Savannah, until 1971. Since at least 2006, Macon has been included in the proposed Georgia Rail Passenger Program to restore intercity rail service but as of 2020, Georgia lacks any intercity passenger rail service other than the federally funded interstate Amtrak services. In 2022, Amtrak announced a new 15-year plan to expand its services, which included Macon.

==== Pedestrians and cycling ====
- Heritage Trail
- Ocmulgee Heritage Trail

== Sister cities ==
Macon has six sister cities, as designated by Sister Cities International, Inc. (SCI):

- Mâcon, France
- Elmina, Ghana
- Kurobe, Toyama, Japan
- Ulyanovsk, Russia
- Kaohsiung, Taiwan
- Gwacheon, South Korea

== See also ==
- Downtown Macon, Georgia
- List of mayors of Macon, Georgia
- List of U.S. cities with large Black populations
- USS Macon, three ships (including an airship)

== Bibliography ==
Published in 19th century

- John P. Campbell, ed. (1854). "Georgia: Bibb County". Southern Business Directory. Charleston, SC: Press of Walker & James.
- Adiel Sherwood (1860), "Bibb County: Macon", Gazetteer of Georgia (4th ed.), Macon: S. Boykin
- John C. Butler (1879). Historical Record of Macon and Central Georgia. J. W. Burke & Company.
- George E. Waring, Jr.; U.S. Department of the Interior, Census Office (1887), "Georgia: Macon", Report on the Social Statistics of Cities: Southern and the Western States, Washington DC: Government Printing Office, pp. 169–172
- "Macon", Rand, McNally & Co.'s Handy Guide to the Southeastern States, Chicago: Rand, McNally & Co., 1899 – via Internet Archive

Published in 20th century

- Allen D. Candler; Clement A. Evans, eds. (1906). "Macon". Georgia: Comprising Sketches of Counties, Towns, Events, Institutions, and Persons Arranged in Cyclopedic Form. Vol. 2. Atlanta: State Historical Association. pp. 511+. hdl:2027/mdp.39015027784332.
- Chisholm, Hugh, ed. (1911). "Macon" . Encyclopædia Britannica. Vol. 17 (11th ed.). Cambridge University Press. p. 267.
- Federal Writers' Project (1940), "Macon", Georgia: a Guide to Its Towns and Countryside, American Guide Series, Athens: University of Georgia Press, p. 102+
- Ida Young, Julius Gholson, and Clara Nell Hargrove. History of Macon, Georgia (Macon, Ga.: Lyon, Marshall & Brooks, 1950).
- John A. Eisterhold. "Commercial, Financial, and Industrial Macon, Georgia, During the 1840s", The Georgia Historical Quarterly, Winter 1969, Vol. 53 Issue 4, pp 424–441
- James H. Stone. "Economic Conditions in Macon, Georgia in the 1830s", The Georgia Historical Quarterly, Summer 1970, Vol. 54 Issue 2, pp 209–225
- Bowling C. Yates. "Macon, Georgia, Inland Trading Center 1826–1836", The Georgia Historical Quarterly, Fall 1971, Vol. 55 Issue 3, pp 365–377
- McInvale, Morton Ray "Macon, Georgia: The War Years, 1861–1865" (Ph.D. dissertation, Florida State University, 1973)
- Roger K. Hux. "The Ku Klux Klan in Macon 1919–1925", The Georgia Historical Quarterly, Summer 1978, Vol. 62 Issue 2, pp 155–168
- Nancy Anderson, Macon: A Pictorial History (Virginia Beach, Va.: Donning, 1979).
- Donnie D. Bellamy. "Macon, Georgia, 1823–1860: A Study in Urban Slavery", Phylon 45 (December 1984): 300–304, 308–309
- Kristina Simms. Macon, Georgia's Central City: An Illustrated History (Chatsworth, Calif.: Windsor, 1989).
- Titus Brown. "Origins of African American Education in Macon, Georgia 1865–1866", Journal of South Georgia History, Oct 1996, Vol. 11, pp 43–59
- Macon: An Architectural Historical Guide (Macon, Ga.: Middle Georgia Historical Society, 1996).
- Macon's Black Heritage: The Untold Story (Macon, Ga.: Tubman African American Museum, 1997).
- Matthew W. Norman. "James H. Burton and the Confederate States Armory at Macon", The Georgia Historical Quarterly, Winter 1997, Vol. 81 Issue 4, pp 974–987
- Titus Brown. "A New England Missionary and African-American Education in Macon: Raymond G. Von Tobel at the Ballard Normal School, 1908–1935", The Georgia Historical Quarterly, Summer 1998, Vol. 82 Issue 2, pp 283–304
- Robert S. Davis. Cotton, Fire, & Dreams: The Robert Findlay Iron Works and Heavy Industry in Macon, Georgia, 1839–1912 (Macon, Ga., 1998)
- Richard W. Iobst (2009) [1999]. Civil War Macon: The History of a Confederate City. Mercer University Press. ISBN 978-0-88146-172-5.
- Jeanne Herring (2000). Macon, Georgia. Black America. Charleston, South Carolina: Arcadia.

Published in 21st century

- Tracy Maurer (2001). Macon Celebrates the Millennium. Montgomery, Ala.: Community Communications. ISBN 1581920342.
- Andrew Michael Manis (2004). Macon Black and White: An Unutterable Separation in the American Century. Mercer University Press. ISBN 978-0-86554-958-6.
- Paul T. Hellmann (2006). "Georgia: Macon". Historical Gazetteer of the United States. Taylor & Francis. ISBN 1-135-94859-3.
- Robert Scott Davis. "A Cotton Kingdom Retooled for War: The Macon Arsenal and the Confederate Ordnance Establishment", The Georgia Historical Quarterly, Fall 2007, Vol. 91 Issue 3, pp 266–291
- Candace Dyer, Street Singers, Soul Shakers, Rebels with a Cause: Music from Macon (Macon, Ga.: Indigo Publishing Group, 2008).
- Mara L. Keire. For Business and Pleasure: Red-Light Districts and the Regulation of Vice in the United States, 1890–1933 (Johns Hopkins University Press, 2010); 248 pages; History and popular culture of districts in Macon, Ga., and other cities
- Macon. Images of America. Charleston, S.C.: Arcadia. 2013. ISBN 9781467111157.
- Wynne, Ben, Something in the Water: A History of Music in Macon, Georgia, 1823-1980 (Mercer University Press, 2021)
