= USS Macon =

USS Macon has been the name of more than one United States Navy ship or airship, and may refer to:

- USS Macon (ZRS-5), an Akron-class rigid airship commissioned in 1933 and destroyed in a crash in 1935
- USS Macon (PF-96), a planned Tacoma-class frigate cancelled in 1943
- USS Macon (CA-132), a Baltimore-class heavy cruiser commissioned in 1945 and struck in 1969

== See also ==
- CSS Macon
