= Macon Downtown Airport =

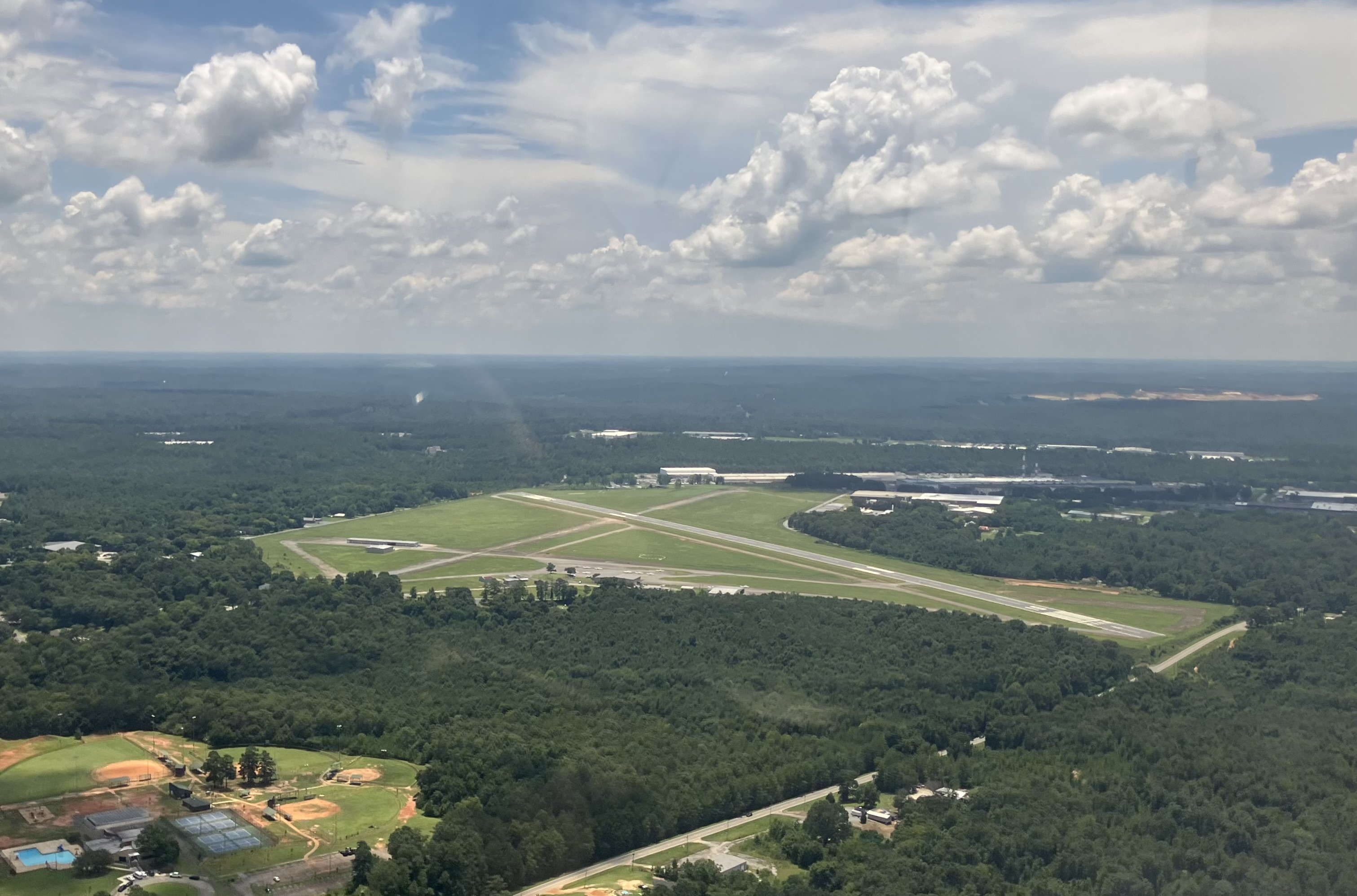
- July 2026 aerial view from the northeast
- IATA: MAC; ICAO: KMAC; FAA LID: MAC

Summary
- Airport type: Public
- Owner: City of Macon
- Serves: Macon, Georgia
- Elevation AMSL: 437 ft (133 m)
- Coordinates: 32°49′20″N 083°33′43″W

Map
- Location of Macon Downtown Airport

Runways
Direction	Length		Surface
Direction	ft	m	Surface
10/28	4,696	1,431	Asphalt

Statistics (2009)
- Aircraft operations: 24,600
- Based aircraft: 43
- Source: Federal Aviation Administration

Macon Downtown Airport (IATA: MAC, ICAO: KMAC, FAA LID: MAC) is a city-owned public-use airport located three nautical miles (3.5 mi, 5.6 km) southeast of the central business district of Macon, in Bibb County, Georgia, United States. The airport was named Herbert Smart Downtown Airport from 1937 to 1998 when it was given its current name. Macon Downtown Airport is included in the FAA's National Plan of Integrated Airport Systems for 2011–2015, which categorized it as a general aviation facility. It has no scheduled commercial airline service, though historically it was utilized by Eastern Air Lines and Delta Air Lines before they relocated their point of service for the Macon area to Middle Georgia Regional Airport.

== History ==
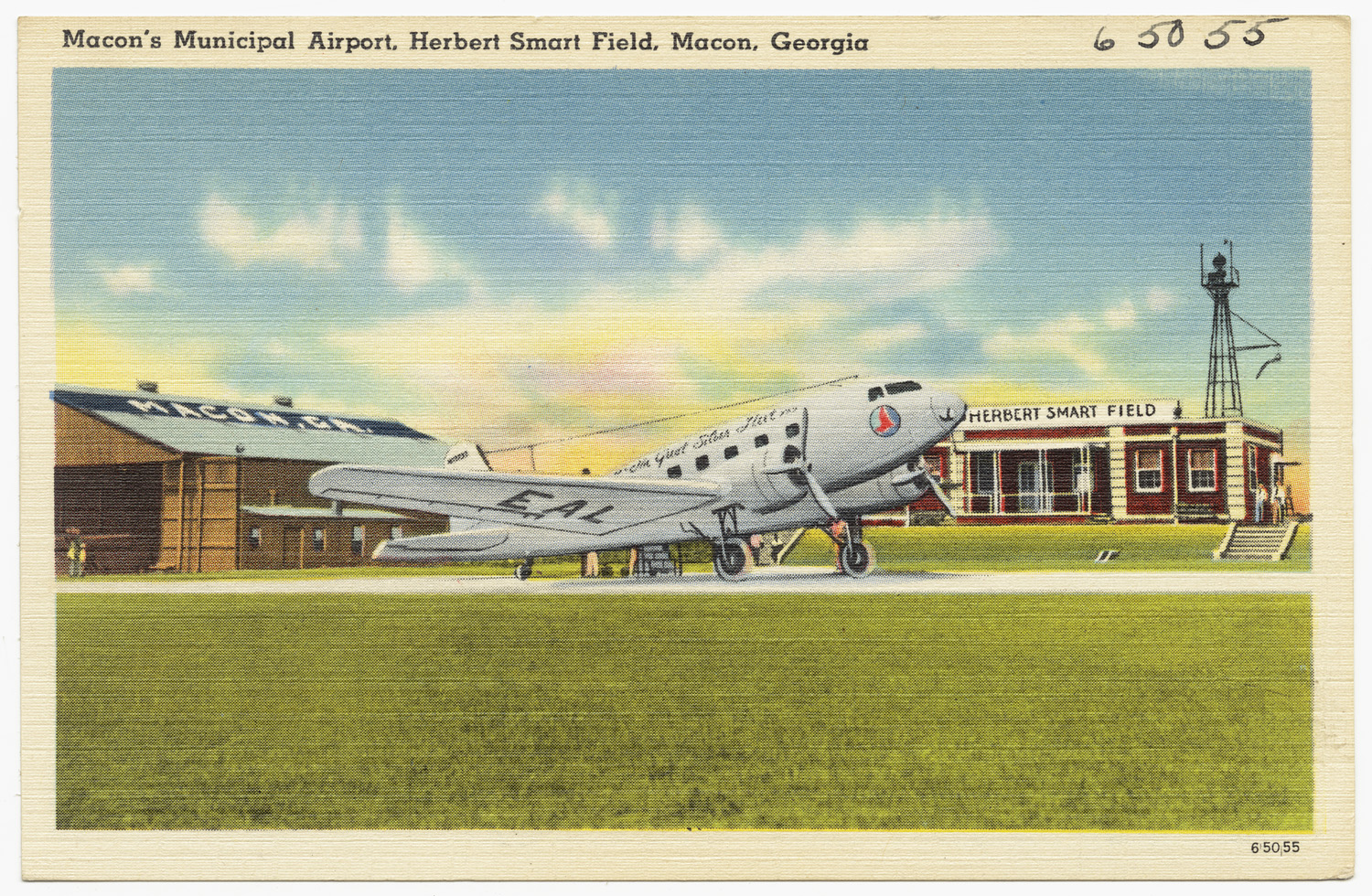
A postcard view of the 1937 administration building and hangar of Herbert Smart Field

Macon Downtown Airport's origins can be traced to World War I when the area it would be built on was established as Camp Wheeler as a mobilization site for the National Guard. As early as 1925, Huff Daland Dusters, the precursor of Delta Air Lines, based its crop dusting operation at Camp Wheeler. In 1936 the City of Macon purchased 250 acres (100 ha) of airfield for $107,000 to replace its inadequate "Miller Field" to support Eastern Air Transport's passenger and mail service to Macon. Then the Works Project Administration began a $500,000 project that included a hangar, a 24-foot (7.3 m) by 56 feet (17 m), administration building, and a concrete apron. The new airport was dedicated on November 11, 1937, and named in honor of the mayor, Herbert Smart.

With the defense buildup in 1940 the Army reactivated Camp Wheeler, adjacent to Smart Field, in March 1941. The 4th Air Depot Group, set up a tent camp at Herbert Smart Airport from September to December 1941 and took part in the "Carolina Maneuvers." With Warner Robins Field under construction, its prospective commanding officer, Col. Charles Thomas, set up a headquarters under canvas at the Herbert Smart airport in November 1941. On December 6, 1941, the 5th Air Depot Group arrived. Due to the United States' entry into the war, the 4th Air Depot Group shipped out on December 20.

On January 7, 1942, the City of Macon leased the airport's 296 acres (120 ha) to the Army for the duration, the name of the facility being changed to Macon Army Air Base, although the facility was also known as "Smart Field". An additional 95 acres (38 ha) was leased from an individual. The Army then spent approximately $1 million by adding a hangar, barracks for 120 officers and 2,500 men, and additional paving of the airfield among other improvements. In early 1942, a Douglas C-39 (DC-2), a Fairchild C-61, and a PT-18 Stearman were assigned to the airfield. In July, these aircraft moved to the newly opened Robins AAF south of the city.

During the summer of 1942, the 1llth and the 154th Observation Squadrons spent two months at Macon AAF on maneuvers. In October, the training of chemical warfare troops in air operations and chemical depot duties began. The training unit, known as Chemical Company Air Operations, had 3,200 men present in October 1942. In January 1943, an Aeronca L-3C was assigned to the airfield. The base newspaper, "Smart News," kept the men informed of local, national, and war news. in July 1943, Smart reached a high-water mark with 4,119 enlisted men present.

Air Operations companies were equipped and taught to use smoke pots, tear gas, chemical trailers, trucks, blasting caps, and how to fill aircraft spray tanks. The base reportedly received a weekly dosing of tear gas to develop the troop's ability to work with the gas. Smart's chemical warfare troops received small arms training at Camp Wheeler. By the end of 1943, 14 chemical companies had shipped out after having been trained and equipped. The chemical air warfare operations ended on May 16, 1944, when the last unit departed.

For the remainder of the war, training of aviation quartermaster truck companies took place at the airfield. All air operations ended on October 7, 1944, when the airfield was placed on inactive status. The caretaker force numbered one officer and nine men.

=== Postwar use ===
The fixed-base operator (FBO) of Macon Downtown Airport is Middle Georgia State University, a Piper Archer TX of the school is pictured here in front of the airport's terminal building.

Following the war, Delta Air Lines joined Eastern in providing air service at Smart Airport on July 1, 1947; however, a tornado hit the airport destroying eleven airplanes and a hangar on January 31, 1947. The destruction prompted city officials to relocate commercial services to the then military-controlled Cochran Field. On December 1, 1948 the airlines moved their operations to Cochran Field and Smart Airport became a general aviation airport.

In 1982, city officials considered closing Smart and turning the property into an industrial park. The city had concerns with the airport's low usage, cost to taxpayers, and poor upkeep by the operators of the airport at the time–Macon Air Park. This proposal was successfully fought by various businesses that used the field with their corporate aircraft. The airport saw increased usage and was subject to various improvements throughout the 1980s, such as the installation of a taxiway parallel to Runway 10/28 and a localizer. By 1987, the city had closed one of Herbert Smart's three runways and ceased maintenance of Runway 15/33, allowing the city to focus resources on its main runway, 10/28.

On December 15, 1998, the city council of Macon voted to rename the airport to Macon Downtown Airport to better promote its proximity to the city, despite its location in an unincorporated part of Bibb County at the time. The same resolution designated the airport's terminal as Herbert Smart Terminal to continue honoring the former mayor. All areas in Bibb County became a part of the Macon city limits effective January 1, 2014, due to the consolidation of the Macon and Bibb County governments, finally bringing the city-owned airport within Macon.

In October 2015, the city-county government and Middle Georgia State University entered into an agreement to add fixed-wing and airport management training programs at the airport, supplementing the university's existing aviation training programs at Heart of Georgia Regional Airport in Eastman. At some point between 2019 and 2020, Runway 15/33 was closed to allow for the reduction of the gradient on Runway 10/28.

== Facilities and aircraft ==
Macon Downtown Airport covers an area of 401 acres (162 ha) at an elevation of 437 feet (133 m) above mean sea level. It has one asphalt paved runway: 10/28, which is 4,694 by 100 feet (1,431 x 30 m).

For the 12-month period ending March 17, 2009, the airport had 24,600 aircraft operations, an average of 67 per day: 94% general aviation, 6% air taxi, and <1% military. At that time there were 43 aircraft based at this airport: 74% single-engine, 16% multi-engine, and 9% helicopter.

The terminal building for Macon Downtown Airport is officially named Herbert Smart Terminal. Herbert Smart Terminal was completed in 2005 with a total cost of $650,000.

== Accidents ==
- On September 18, 2012, at 10:03 am a Beech 400 arriving at Macon Downtown Airport from Charleston International Airport crashed into the woods beyond airport property and Ocmulgee East Boulevard after overrunning the departure end of Runway 28. The runway was wet and lacked grooving, causing the jet to hydroplane after landing with too much speed given the runway's condition. The Beech 400 was significantly damaged and two of the three occupants on the aircraft sustained minor injuries.

== See also ==
- Georgia World War II Army Airfields
- List of airports in Georgia (U.S. state)
