= Timeline of Macon, Georgia =

The following is a timeline of the history of the city of Macon, Georgia, United States.

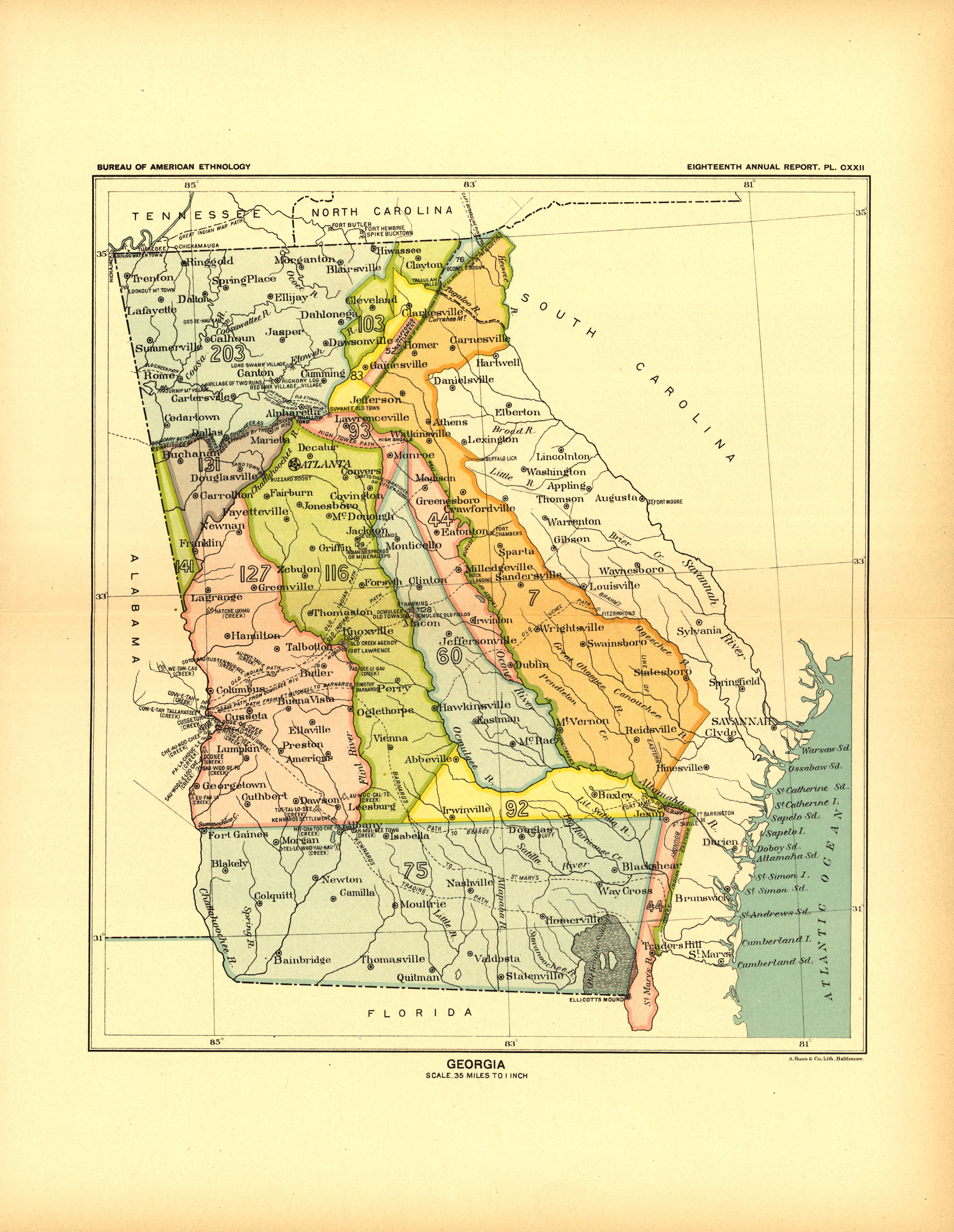
Map of Georgia showing Ocmulgee tribal towns, old fields, and trading paths leading to Ft. Hawkins

- 1806 – U.S. Fort Hawkins built at the present-day site of Creek Indian Ocmulgee Old Fields (future site of Macon).
- 1821 – Fort Hawkins settlement renamed "Newtown".
- 1822 – Bibb County created.
- 1823 – Town of Macon incorporated; named after North Carolina statesman Nathaniel Macon.
- 1826
  - Macon Telegraph newspaper begins publication.
  - First Presbyterian Church founded.
- 1829 – Newtown becomes part of Macon.
- 1833 – Steamboat in operation.
- 1834 – City of Macon incorporated.
- 1835 – Robert Augustus Beall elected mayor.
- 1836 – Monroe Railroad Bank built.
- 1838 – Monroe Railroad (Forsyth-Macon) begins operating.
- 1839 – Georgia Female College opens.
- 1840
  - Rose Hill Cemetery established.
  - Population: 3,927.
- 1843 – The Central of Georgia Railway connects Savannah and Macon.
- 1846 – The Macon and Western Railroad connects Macon and Atlanta; the Small House (residence) built (approximate date).
- 1848 – Telegraph begins operating.
- 1851 – Georgia State Fair relocates to Macon.
- 1860
  - Belgian Fair and Cotton Planters' Exposition held.
  - Population: 8,247.
- 1862 – "Arsenal of the Confederate Government moved to Macon" during the American Civil War.
- 1864
  - July 30: Macon besieged by Union forces.
  - "City Hall made temporary State Capitol of Georgia."
- 1865 – April 20: Macon occupied by Union forces.
- 1866 – October 29: Equal Rights and Educational Association of Georgia meeting held in Macon.
- 1871
  - Mercer University relocates to Macon from Penfield.
  - Bibb Manufacturing Company in business.
- 1874 – Public Library (social library) established.
- 1876 – Mount de Sales Academy active.
- 1880
  - Telephone begins operating.
  - Population: 12,749.
- 1884
  - Macon Daily News begins publication.
  - Academy of Music built.
- 1887
  - April 6: Riverside Cemetery chartered
  - August 6: Woolfolk family murdered near Macon.
- 1900 – Price Library (public library) opens.
- 1906 – Ocmulgee River levee construction begins.
- 1910 – Population: 40,665.
- 1917 – Cox Capitol Theatre in business.
- 1918
  - National Association for the Advancement of Colored People Columbus branch organized (approximate date).
  - Macon Art Association formed.
  - Outbreak of Spanish flu.
- 1919
  - Washington Memorial Library (public library) established.
  - Paul Jones was lynched on November 2, 1919, after being accused of attacking a fifty-year-old white woman. He was burned alive.
- 1921 – Douglass Theatre and Rialto Theatre in business.
- 1922
  - WMAZ radio begins broadcasting.
  - Sherah Israel Synagogue built.
- 1925 – Macon City Auditorium built.
- 1929
  - Luther Williams Field (stadium) opens.
  - Walker Business College, an African American business and vocational school opens a second campus in Macon
- 1933 – Citizens & Southern National Bank building constructed.
- 1936
  - Ocmulgee National Monument established.
  - Farmer's Market built.
- 1938 – Bibb Theatre in business.
- 1948 – WIBB radio begins broadcasting.
- 1949 – Middle Georgia Regional Library headquartered in Macon.
- 1950 – Population: 70,252.
- 1952 – Georgia Journal newspaper begins publication.
- 1953 – WMAZ-TV begins broadcasting.
- 1955 – Singer James Brown records his first single "Please, Please, Please" at the studio of WIBB radio in Macon.
- 1960 – "Stratford Academy founded"
- 1964 – Middle Georgia Historical Society formed.
- 1965 – Macon Junior College established.
- 1966 – U.S. Supreme Court decides Evans v. Newton desegregation-related lawsuit.
- 1967
  - December 18: Funeral of musician Otis Redding.
  - Ronnie Thompson becomes mayor.
- 1970 – Population: 122,423.
- 1978 – Middle Georgia Archives organized.
- 1983
  - Cherry Blossom Festival begins.
  - Richard Ray becomes U.S. representative for Georgia's 3rd congressional district.
- 1993 – Sanford Bishop becomes U.S. representative for Georgia's 2nd congressional district.
- 1994
  - July: Flood.
  - Georgia Sports Hall of Fame relocates to Macon.
- 1999 – C. Jack Ellis becomes mayor.
- 2000 – Population: 97,255.
- 2001 – City website online (approximate date).
- 2003 – Historic Macon Foundation formed.
- 2007 – Robert Reichert becomes mayor.
- 2010 – Population: 91,351.
- 2012 – Governments of Macon city and Bibb County consolidated.
- 2015 – Middle Georgia State University active.

== See also ==
- Macon history
- List of mayors of Macon, Georgia
- National Register of Historic Places listings in Bibb County, Georgia
- Other cities in Georgia:
  - Timeline of Athens, Georgia
  - Timeline of Atlanta
  - Timeline of Augusta, Georgia
  - Timeline of Columbus, Georgia
  - Timeline of Savannah, Georgia

== Bibliography ==
Published in 19th century

- John P. Campbell, ed. (1854). "Georgia: Bibb County". Southern Business Directory. Charleston, SC: Press of Walker & James.
- Adiel Sherwood (1860), "Bibb County: Macon", Gazetteer of Georgia (4th ed.), Macon: S. Boykin
- John C. Butler (1879). Historical Record of Macon and Central Georgia. J. W. Burke & Company.
- George E. Waring, Jr.; U.S. Department of the Interior, Census Office (1887), "Georgia: Macon", Report on the Social Statistics of Cities: Southern and the Western States, Washington DC: Government Printing Office, pp. 169–172
- "Macon", Rand, McNally & Co.'s Handy Guide to the Southeastern States, Chicago: Rand, McNally & Co., 1899 – via Internet Archive

Published in 20th century

- Allen D. Candler; Clement A. Evans, eds. (1906). "Macon". Georgia: Comprising Sketches of Counties, Towns, Events, Institutions, and Persons Arranged in Cyclopedic Form. Vol. 2. Atlanta: State Historical Association. pp. 511+ – via HathiTrust.
- "Macon", Encyclopaedia Britannica (11th ed.), New York, 1910, OCLC 14782424
- Federal Writers' Project (1940), "Macon", Georgia: a Guide to Its Towns and Countryside, American Guide Series, Athens: University of Georgia Press, p. 102+
- Ida Young, Julius Gholson, and Clara Nell Hargrove. History of Macon, Georgia (Macon, Ga.: Lyon, Marshall & Brooks, 1950).
- John A. Eisterhold. "Commercial, Financial, and Industrial Macon, Georgia, During the 1840s", The Georgia Historical Quarterly, Winter 1969, Vol. 53 Issue 4, pp 424–441
- James H. Stone. "Economic Conditions in Macon, Georgia in the 1830s", The Georgia Historical Quarterly, Summer 1970, Vol. 54 Issue 2, pp 209–225
- Bowling C. Yates. "Macon, Georgia, Inland Trading Center 1826–1836", The Georgia Historical Quarterly, Fall 1971, Vol. 55 Issue 3, pp 365–377
- McInvale, Morton Ray "Macon, Georgia: The War Years, 1861–1865" (Ph.D. dissertation, Florida State University, 1973)
- Roger K. Hux. "The Ku Klux Klan in Macon 1919–1925", The Georgia Historical Quarterly, Summer 1978, Vol. 62 Issue 2, pp 155–168
- Nancy Anderson, Macon: A Pictorial History (Virginia Beach, Va.: Donning, 1979).
- Donnie D. Bellamy. "Macon, Georgia, 1823–1860: A Study in Urban Slavery", Phylon 45 (December 1984): 300–304, 308–309
- Kristina Simms. Macon, Georgia's Central City: An Illustrated History (Chatsworth, Calif.: Windsor, 1989).
- Titus Brown. "Origins of African American Education in Macon, Georgia 1865–1866", Journal of South Georgia History, Oct 1996, Vol. 11, pp 43–59
- Macon: An Architectural Historical Guide (Macon, Ga.: Middle Georgia Historical Society, 1996).
- Macon's Black Heritage: The Untold Story (Macon, Ga.: Tubman African American Museum, 1997).
- Matthew W. Norman. "James H. Burton and the Confederate States Armory at Macon", The Georgia Historical Quarterly, Winter 1997, Vol. 81 Issue 4, pp 974–987
- Titus Brown. "A New England Missionary and African-American Education in Macon: Raymond G. Von Tobel at the Ballard Normal School, 1908–1935", The Georgia Historical Quarterly, Summer 1998, Vol. 82 Issue 2, pp 283–304
- Robert S. Davis. Cotton, Fire, & Dreams: The Robert Findlay Iron Works and Heavy Industry in Macon, Georgia, 1839–1912 (Macon, Ga., 1998)
- Richard W. Iobst (2009) [1999]. Civil War Macon: The History of a Confederate City. Mercer University Press. ISBN 978-0-88146-172-5.
- Jeanne Herring (2000). Macon, Georgia. Black America. Charleston, South Carolina: Arcadia.

Published in 21st century

- Tracy Maurer (2001). Macon Celebrates the Millennium. Montgomery, Ala.: Community Communications. ISBN 1581920342.
- Andrew Michael Manis (2004). Macon Black and White: An Unutterable Separation in the American Century. Mercer University Press. ISBN 978-0-86554-958-6.
- Paul T. Hellmann (2006). "Georgia: Macon". Historical Gazetteer of the United States. Taylor & Francis. ISBN 1-135-94859-3.
- Robert Scott Davis. "A Cotton Kingdom Retooled for War: The Macon Arsenal and the Confederate Ordnance Establishment", The Georgia Historical Quarterly, Fall 2007, Vol. 91 Issue 3, pp 266–291
- Candace Dyer, Street Singers, Soul Shakers, Rebels with a Cause: Music from Macon (Macon, Ga.: Indigo Publishing Group, 2008).
- Mara L. Keire. For Business and Pleasure: Red-Light Districts and the Regulation of Vice in the United States, 1890–1933 (Johns Hopkins University Press, 2010); 248 pages; History and popular culture of districts in Macon, Ga., and other cities
- Macon. Images of America. Charleston, S.C.: Arcadia. 2013. ISBN 9781467111157.
