= Buck Melton =

American politician (1923–2014)

Mayor of Macon, Georgia
- In office 1975–1979
- Preceded by: Ronnie Thompson
- Succeeded by: George Israel

Personal details
- Born: October 24, 1923 Arlington, Georgia
- Died: March 5, 2014 (aged 90) Macon, Georgia
- Party: Democratic
- Spouse: Tommie Melton (1954–2014) (his death)

Buckner Franklin "Buck" Melton Sr. (October 24, 1923 – March 5, 2014) was an American politician and lawyer who served as the mayor of Macon, Georgia, from 1975 until 1979.

== Biography ==
=== Early life ===
Melton was born in Arlington, Georgia, on October 24, 1923. He was the youngest child of Reverend Henry Martin Melton, a Baptist minister, and Mary Marguerite (née Layman) Melton. He was raised in Moultrie, Georgia, and graduated from Moultrie High School in 1941. He first visited Macon, Georgia, when he was six years old.

Melton attended Norman Junior College. He later received his Bachelor of Arts degree from Mercer University and his law degree from the Walter F. George School of Law at Mercer University in 1949. He served as a United States Naval officer during World War II and the Korean War. He served as an amphibious warfare officer in the Pacific theater during World War II. In 1983, Melton retired from the U.S. Navy Reserve as a lieutenant commander.

He met his future wife, Tommie Beck, while both were attending a play at the Macon Little Theatre. The couple married in October 1954.

=== Law practice ===
He practiced as a lawyer in Macon before entering politics. Melton served as the city attorney within the administration of former Mayor Ed Wilson (1960–1963). As city attorney, Melton is credited with spearheading the abolition of Macon's segregation ordinances during Mayor Wilson's tenure. Andrew Manis, a civil rights historian and history professor at Middle Georgia State College, has credited Melton with both the city's desegregation and the improvement of opportunities for the African-American community during the era, "In some ways, Buck Melton was Macon's finest hour when it comes to race relations...Black leadership developed a quiet confidence in Buck Melton as a person."

Melton became the President of the Greater Macon Chamber of Commerce in 1971 and president of the Macon Bar Association in 1973. He helped establish the Keep Macon-Bibb Beautiful Commission in 1974 and provided pro bono legal work to the organization. He also served on the board of directors for several organizations, including the Georgia Board of Industry and Trade, the Macon-Bibb County Urban Development Authority, the Macon State College Foundation, and the Macon Civic Club.

=== Political career ===
In 1975, Melton was elected mayor of Macon by defeating his opponent, Julius C. Hope, the city's first African-American mayoral candidate. Melton succeeded outgoing Mayor Ronnie Thompson, who had served as Macon's first elected Republican mayor for two consecutive terms.

Under Mayor Melton, seventy miles of streets were paved in Macon. He also introduced the rollaway garbage carts to facilitate curbside garbage collection, a service which was introduced for the first time under Melton's administration. The garbage cans became known as "Buck’s Buckets." Melton successful proposed a $7 million bond issue, which was used to construct the Mercer University School of Medicine in Macon. (He later served on the School of Medicine's board of directors as well). He also introduced several spending initiatives. He instituted a penny tax, which was used to alleviate the city's property taxes.

By his own admission, then-city councilman George Israel, who had been elected to the council in 1975, was one of Mayor Melton's most prominent critics, "I was probably his biggest critic on City Council...I spent my eight years (as mayor) apologizing to him for not understanding." Israel, who succeeded Melton in 1979 as the city's second elected Republican mayor, later credited Melton for much of the progress achieved during Israel's own two mayoral terms, saying Melton "had a vision for the city and changed a lot of things."

Melton declined to seek re-election for a second term in 1979. At the time of his retirement, the Mayor of Macon received very little pay or benefits, which may have contributed his decision not to seek another term. (The Mayor received an annual salary of just $30,000, with no life insurance, health insurance or retirement plan). He was succeeded by George Israel, who became Macon's second Republican mayor.

Melton returned to his law practice after leaving office. He co-founded the Sell & Melton law firm through the merger of his own firm, McKenna, House, Lancaster & Green, with a second firm, Sell, Comer & Popper.

In 1982, Melton ran as an unsuccessful gubernatorial candidate for Governor of Georgia. While the Atlanta Constitution praised his credentials, Melton's campaign lacked the funding to run an effective campaign against opponents with deeper pockets. He lost the Democratic primary election to Joe Frank Harris, who was elected Governor in the general election.

Buck Melton made one more foray into elected politics in 1999 when he sought election as Mayor of Macon again. Incumbent Mayor Jim Marshall had decided to run for the United States House of Representatives. Melton entered the race for Mayor of Macon, but was defeated in the Democratic mayoral primary election by C. Jack Ellis. Ellis went on to win the 1999 mayoral general election, becoming the city's first African-American mayor.

=== Later life ===
In 2004, Melton published his memoir, called "Closing Arguments." Former U.S. Senator Sam Nunn (D-Georgia) contributed a tribute to his career on the book's back cover, writing, "Buck is an unsung hero of Middle Georgia's prosperity and growth," further saying that Melton "had a hand in the most successful and significant undertakings" in the region throughout the previous three decades.

Buck Melton remained very involved with his law firm until he suffered a major stroke in April 2007. The McKenna National Guard Armory underwent a major, six million dollar renovation and was rededicated as the Buck Melton Community Center during the summer of 2009. Melton and his wife, Tommie, attended the dedication. Melton thanked the community in a speech at the dedication ceremony, "This building is a shining star...This community’s going to be a whole new world because of this."

Melton's health had further declined following heart complications suffered in January 2014. He died at the Carlyle Place nursing center in Macon, Georgia, on March 5, 2014, at the age of 90. His funeral was held at St. Paul's Episcopal Church in Macon. Three Macon mayors attended his memorial - current Mayor Robert Reichert and former mayors Lee Robinson and C. Jack Ellis. He was buried in Rose Hill Cemetery with full military honors. He was survived by his wife of fifty-nine years, Tommie Melton, and their two children, Leigh Singleton and Buckner F. Melton Jr.
