= 1982 Georgia gubernatorial election =

- November 2, 1982
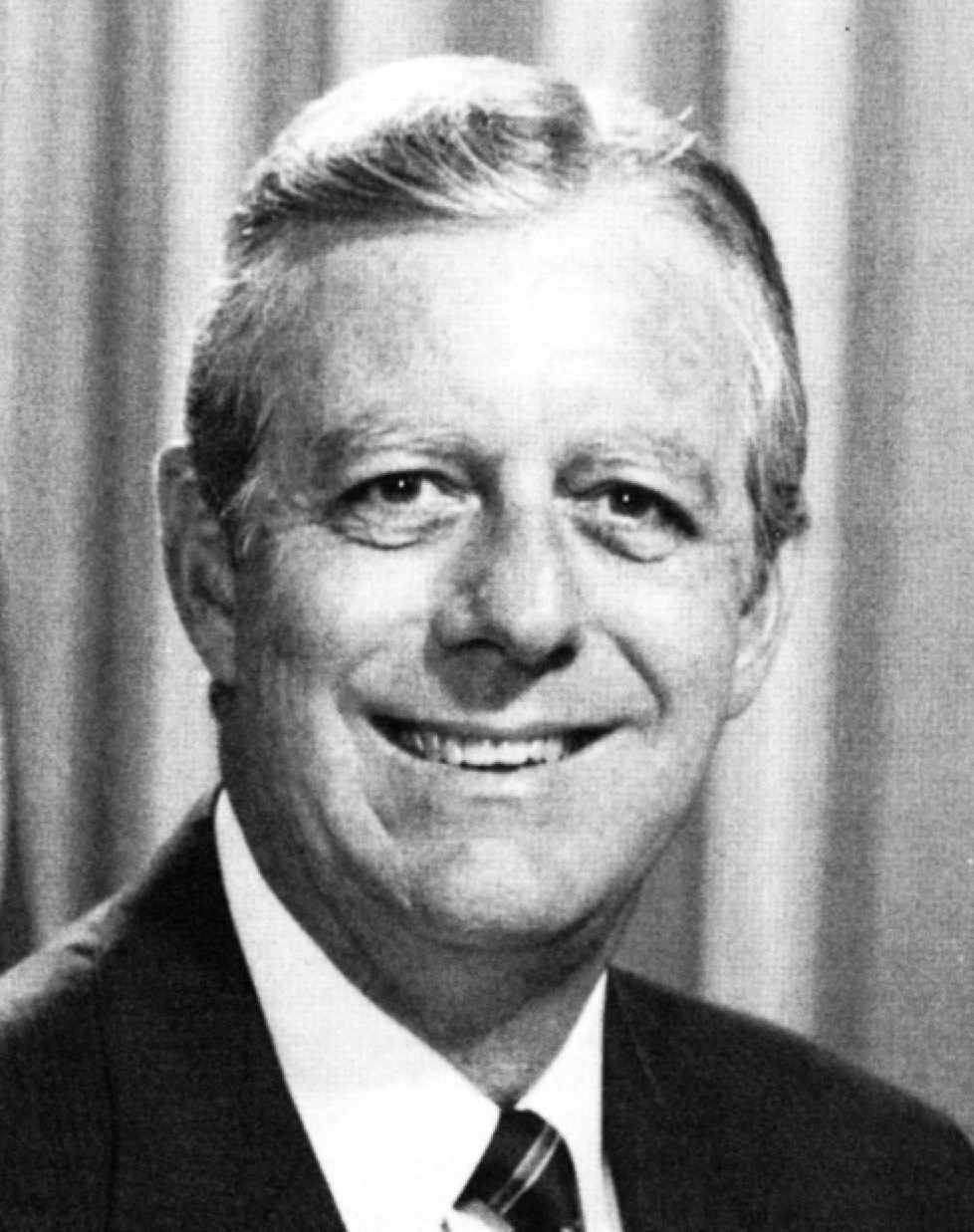

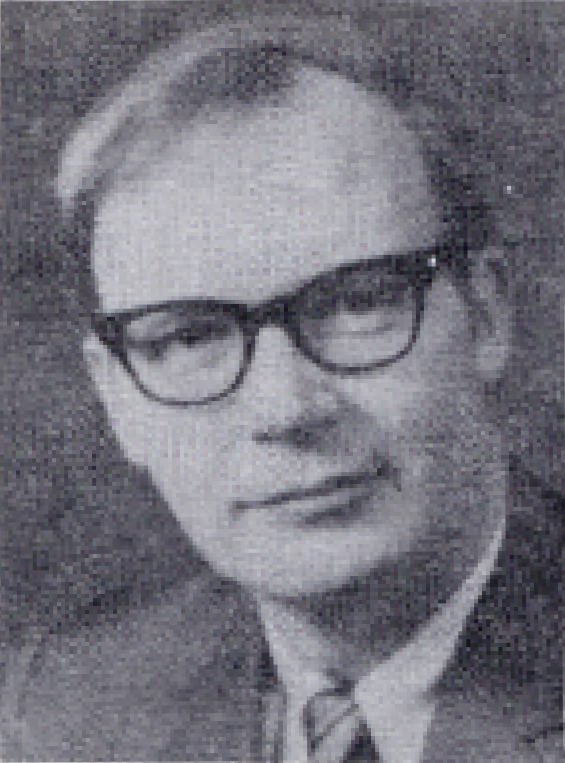
Nominee	Joe Frank Harris	Robert H. Bell
Party	Democratic	Republican
Popular vote	734,090	434,496
Percentage	62.82%	37.18%
- County results Harris: 50–60% 60–70% 70–80% 80–90% >90% Bell: 50–60%
Governor before election
George Busbee
Democratic
Elected Governor
Joe Frank Harris
Democratic

The 1982 Georgia gubernatorial election was held on November 2, 1982. Joe Frank Harris was elected as the 78th Governor of Georgia.

== Democratic nomination ==
=== Candidates ===
==== Nominee ====
- Joe Frank Harris, state representative

==== Eliminated in runoff ====
- Bo Ginn, U.S. representative from Georgia's 1st congressional district (1973–1983)

==== Eliminated in primary ====
- Buck Melton, Mayor of Macon, Georgia (1975–1979)
- Billy Lovett, member of the Georgia Public Service Commission (1979–1990)
- Henry Jackson
- Jack Watson, White House Chief of Staff (1980–1981)
- Mildred Glover, state representative (1975–1983)
- Mac McNease
- Norman Underwood, Judge of the Georgia Court of Appeals (1979)
- Thomas J. Irwin

=== Democratic primary election results ===
Democratic primary results
Party	Candidate	Votes	%
Democratic	Bo Ginn	316,019	35.11
Democratic	Joe Frank Harris	233,545	24.84
Democratic	Norman Underwood	147,535	16.39
Democratic	Jack Watson	114,553	12.72
Democratic	Billy Lovett	62,341	6.93
Democratic	Buck Melton	20,052	2.23
Democratic	Mildred Glover	8,958	1.00
Democratic	Henry Jackson	2,706	0.30
Democratic	Mac McNease	2,545	0.28
Democratic	Thomas J. Irwin	1,855	0.21

=== Democratic runoff results ===
Democratic primary runoff results by county: Harris: Harris—50–60%; Harris—60–70%; Harris—80–90%; Harris—<90%; Ginn: Ginn—50–60%; Ginn—60–70%; Ginn—70–80%; Ginn—80–90%

Democratic primary results
Party	Candidate	Votes	%
Democratic	Joe Frank Harris	500,765	54.97
Democratic	Bo Ginn	410,259	45.03

== Republican nomination ==
Robert H. Bell won the primary with 36,347 votes (59.19%) over Benjamin B. Blackburn and his 25,063 votes (40.81%).

== General election results ==
Though the Democrats once again won the election, Bell did win five counties (Cobb, Gwinnett, DeKalb, Fayette, Bulloch) and the GOP gained their most votes in an election since Howard Callaway in 1966. As of 2022, this is the last time that DeKalb County voted for the Republican candidate for governor.

Georgia gubernatorial Election 1974
Party	Candidate	Votes	%	±%
Democratic	Joe Frank Harris	734,090	62.79%	
Republican	Robert H. Bell	434,496	37.17%	
Democratic hold		Swing		
