= 2013 Macon mayoral election =

Mayoral election in Macon

- September 17, 2013 (first round); October 15, 2013 (Runoff)
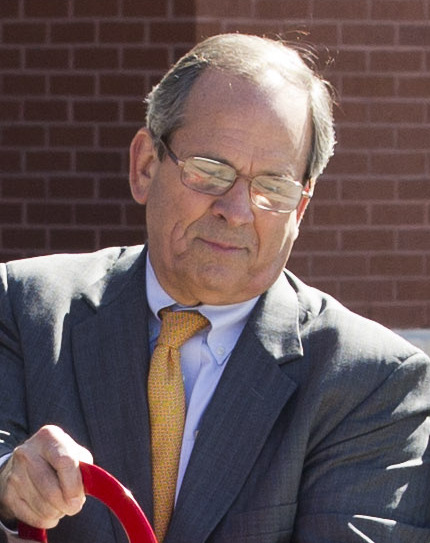

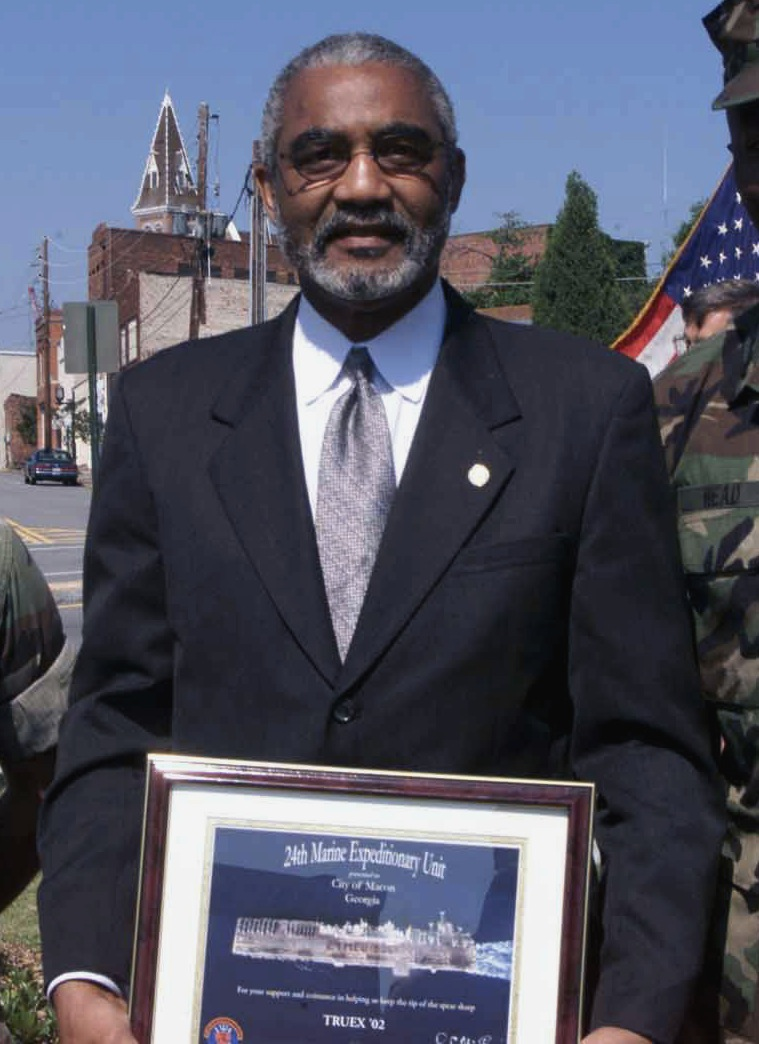

| Candidate | Robert Reichert | C. Jack Ellis |
| First round | 17,810; 49.58% | 10,838; 30.17% |
| Runoff | 25,899; 63.04% | 15,182; 36.96% |
| Candidate | Samuel F. Hart | Charles Bishop |
| First round | 4,101; 11.42% | 2,452; 6.83% |
| Runoff | Eliminated | Eliminated |
Mayor before election
Robert Reichert (as Mayor of Macon)
Nonpartisan
Elected mayor
Robert Reichert
Nonpartisan

The 2013 Macon mayoral election took place on October 15, 2013, following a primary election on September 17, 2013. The election followed the consolidation of the city of Macon and Bibb County, and was the first election for Mayor of the consolidated city-county. The election was originally scheduled for July 16, 2013, but because the state of Georgia required preclearance for voting changes under the Voting Rights Act of 1965, the U.S. Department of Justice was required to approve the change, which it did not do in time for the election to be held.

Macon Mayor Robert Reichert fell short of winning an absolute majority in the September 17 election, and advanced to a runoff election against former Mayor C. Jack Ellis. Reichert defeated Ellis in a landslide, winning 63 percent of the vote to Ellis's 37 percent.

== Primary election ==
=== Candidates ===
- Robert Reichert, Mayor of Macon
- C. Jack Ellis, former Mayor of Macon
- Samuel F. Hart, Chairman of the Bibb County Commission
- Charles Bishop, former Chairman of the Bibb County Commission
- Joe Allen, Bibb County Commissioner
- David Cousino, security manager

=== Results ===
2013 Macon mayoral primary election
| Party | Candidate | Votes | % |
|---|---|---|---|
| Nonpartisan | Robert Reichert | 17,810 | 49.58% |
| Nonpartisan | C. Jack Ellis | 10,838 | 30.17% |
| Nonpartisan | Samuel F. Hart | 4,101 | 11.42% |
| Nonpartisan | Charles F. Bishop | 2,452 | 9.57% |
| Nonpartisan | Joe Allen | 613 | 1.71% |
| Nonpartisan | David Cousino | 107 | 0.30% |
| Total votes | | 35,921 | 100.00% |

== General election ==
=== Results ===
2013 Macon mayoral general election
| Party | Candidate | Votes | % |
|---|---|---|---|
| Nonpartisan | Robert Reichert | 25,899 | 63.04% |
| Nonpartisan | C. Jack Ellis | 15,182 | 36.96% |
| Total votes | | 41,081 | 100.00% |
