= 1974 Georgia gubernatorial election =

- November 5, 1974
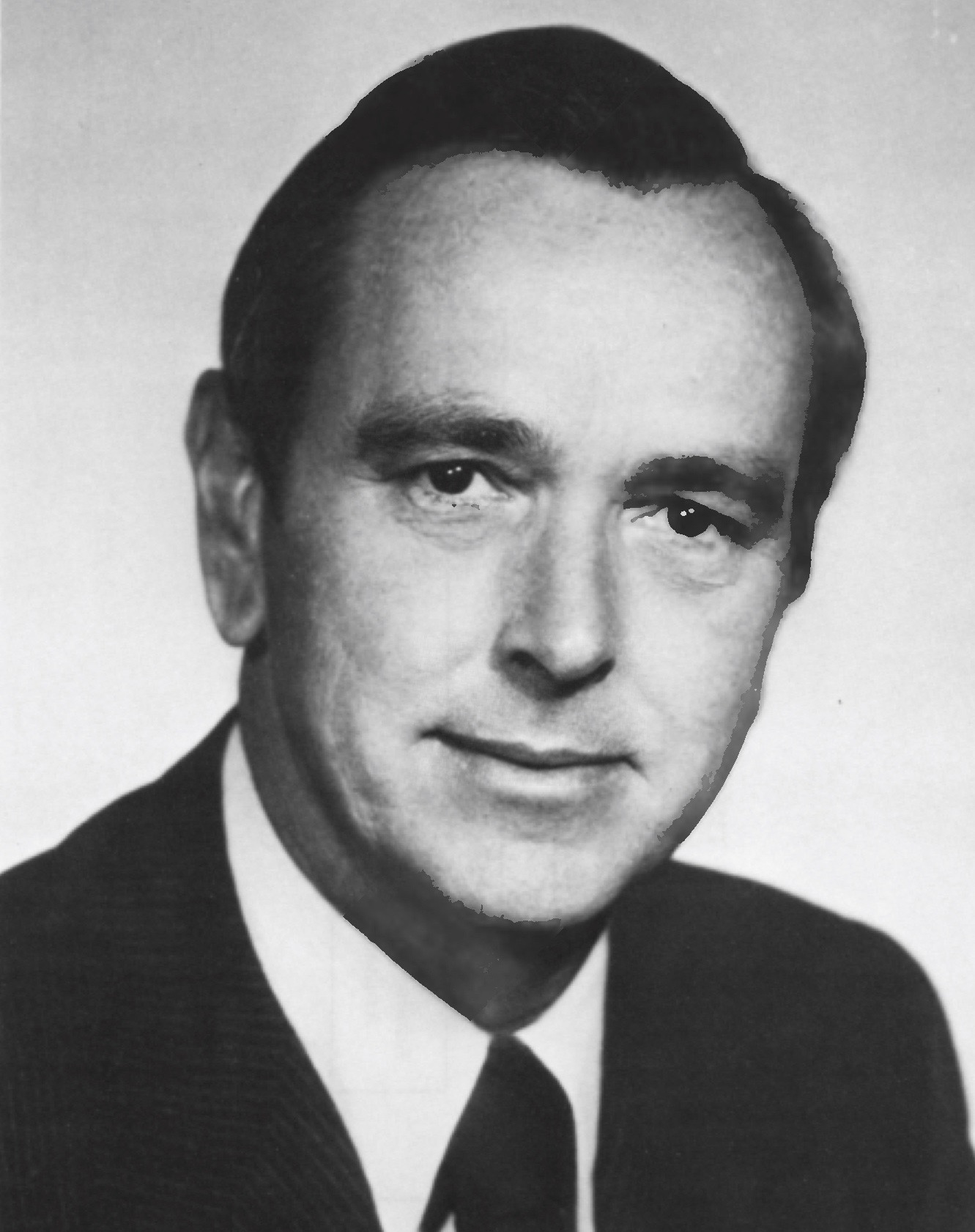

Nominee	George Busbee	Ronnie Thompson
Party	Democratic	Republican
Popular vote	646,777	289,113
Percentage	69.07%	30.87%
- County results Busbee: 50–60% 60–70% 70–80% 80–90% >90% Thompson: 50–60%
Governor before election
Jimmy Carter
Democratic
Elected Governor
George Busbee
Democratic

The 1974 Georgia gubernatorial election was held on November 5, 1974. Under Georgia's constitution at the time, incumbent Democratic Governor Jimmy Carter was ineligible to serve a second consecutive term, and was in the process of launching his presidential campaign. George Busbee was elected as the 77th governor of Georgia.

== Democratic nomination ==
=== Candidates ===
==== Nominee ====
- George Busbee, state representative

==== Eliminated in runoff ====
- Lester Maddox, lieutenant governor (1971–1975) and former governor (1967–1971)

==== Eliminated in primary ====
- David H. Gambrell, former U.S. senator from Georgia (1971–1972)
- Bud Herrin
- Thomas J. Irwin
- Harry C. Jackson, former state senator (1961–1973)
- Bert Lance, businessman
- B. J. Parker
- Robert A. Rowan, state senator (1963–1975)
- George T. Smith, former lieutenant governor (1967–1971)
- Jennings Thompson
- Ronnie Thompson, mayor of Macon, Georgia (1967–1975)

=== Democratic primary election results ===
Democratic primary results
Party	Candidate	Votes	%
Democratic	Lester Maddox	310,384	36.32
Democratic	George Busbee	177,977	20.83
Democratic	Bert Lance	147,026	17.20
Democratic	David H. Gambrell	66,000	7.72
Democratic	George T. Smith	43,196	5.05
Democratic	Harry C. Jackson	42,121	4.93
Democratic	Robert A. Rowan	31,696	3.71
Democratic	Ronnie Thompson	23,933	2.80
Democratic	B. J. Parker	4,650	0.54
Democratic	Bud Herrin	3,419	0.40
Democratic	Thomas J. Irwin	2,224	0.26
Democratic	Jennings Thompson	1,987	0.23

=== Democratic runoff results ===
Democratic runoff results
Party	Candidate	Votes	%
Democratic	George Busbee	551,106	59.86
Democratic	Lester Maddox	369,608	40.14

== Republican nomination ==
=== Candidates ===
==== Nominee ====
- Ronnie Thompson, mayor of Macon, Georgia (1967–1975)

==== Eliminated in runoff ====
- Harold Dye, Army veteran

==== Eliminated in primary ====
- W. M. "Bill" Coolidge
- Harry Geisinger, state representative (1969–1975)
- George Lankford

=== Republican primary election results ===
Republican primary results
Party	Candidate	Votes	%
Republican	Ronnie Thompson	19,691	41.00
Republican	Harold Dye	10,912	22.72
Republican	George Lankford	8,618	17.95
Republican	Harry Geisinger	6,078	12.66
Republican	Bill Coolidge	2,723	5.67

=== Republican runoff results ===
Republican runoff results
Party	Candidate	Votes	%
Republican	Ronnie Thompson	22,211	50.62
Republican	Harold Dye	21,669	49.38

== General election results ==
In a year marred for the Republicans by Richard Nixon's resignation just three months earlier, alongside the continued domination of Georgia by the Democratic Party and Thompson's dividing of the GOP (a move which inspired many prominent figures in the Georgia party to refrain from openly supporting him), Busbee was elected in a landslide. Douglas and Clayton County were the only two counties where Thompson won the most votes. Two years later, the Georgia Constitution was revised, including a rule to allow a governor to be elected to a second consecutive term. Subsequently, Busbee ran for governor again four years later. Zell Miller was elected as lieutenant governor, serving for 16 years. As of 2022, this is the last time that Clayton County voted for the Republican candidate for governor.

Georgia gubernatorial election, 1974
Party	Candidate	Votes	%	±%
Democratic	George Busbee	646,777	69.07%	
Republican	Ronnie Thompson	289,113	30.87%	
Democratic hold		Swing		
