= 2020 Macon mayoral election =

2020 Macon County mayoral election
- May 19, 2020 (primary) August 11, 2020 (runoff)

Candidate	Lester Miller	Cliffard Whitby	Blake Sullivan
Party	Nonpartisan	Nonpartisan	Nonpartisan
First round	17,011; 42.36%	11,015; 27.43%	5,457; 13.59%
Runoff	22,846; 59.18%	15,756; 40.82%	Eliminated
Candidate	Larry Schlesinger	Marc B. Whitfield
Party	Nonpartisan	Nonpartisan
First round	4,769; 11.88%	1,868; 4.65%
Runoff	Eliminated	Eliminated
Mayor before election
Robert Reichert
Elected mayor
Lester Miller

The 2020 Macon mayoral election took place on Tuesday, May 19, 2020, with a runoff election held on Tuesday, August 11, 2020. Incumbent Mayor Robert Reichert, the first mayor following the consolidation of Macon and Bibb County, was term-limited and could not run for re-election. After no candidate received a majority of the vote in the election, a runoff election was held, and County School Board President Lester Miller defeated Clifford Whitby, the former Chairman of the Macon-Bibb County Industrial Authority.

== General election ==
=== Candidates ===
- Lester Miller, President of the Bibb County School Board
- Larry Schlesinger, Bibb County Commissioner
- Blake Sullivan, businessman
- Clifford Whitby, former Chairman of the Macon-Bibb County Industrial Authority
- Marc B. Whitfield, retired banker

=== Results ===
2020 Macon mayoral primary election results
Party	Candidate	Votes	%
Nonpartisan	Lester Miller	17,011	42.36%
Nonpartisan	Cliffard Whitby	11,015	27.43%
Nonpartisan	Blake Sullivan	5,457	13.59%
Nonpartisan	Larry Schlesinger	4,769	11.88%
Nonpartisan	Marc B. Whitfield	1,868	4.65%
Write-in		34	0.08%
Total votes		40,154	100.00%

== Runoff election ==
=== Results ===
2020 Macon mayoral election runoff
Party	Candidate	Votes	%
Nonpartisan	Lester Miller	22,846	59.18%
Nonpartisan	Cliffard Whitby	15,716	40.82%
Total votes		38,602	100.00%
