= George Israel =

American politician (1948–2026)

Mayor of Macon, Georgia
- In office 1979 – December 14, 1987
- Preceded by: Buck Melton
- Succeeded by: Lee Robinson

Personal details
- Born: George Matthew Israel III; February 10, 1948 Macon, Georgia, U.S.
- Died: July 26, 2026 (aged 78)
- Party: Republican
- Spouse: Pam Witherington

George Matthew Israel III (February 10, 1948 – July 26, 2026) was an American politician and businessman. He was the president and CEO of the Georgia Chamber of Commerce, and mayor of Macon, Georgia, from 1979 to 1987, the sixth largest city in the state. Israel was also on the board of directors of YKK Group. In 2005, Georgia Trend, a prominent state business and political magazine, named Israel as one of its top 20 leaders of the past 20 years.

== Background ==
George Matthew Israel III was born in Macon, Georgia, on February 10, 1948, to George and Margaret Israel. His father worked as an engineer at Robins Air Force Base and his mother was a teacher who helped veterans returning from World War II to earn their GEDs. He grew up in a tight-knit family with three brothers and an aunt whom he considered a second mother.

He met his wife, Pam Witherington, while working to pay his way through college, and they married in 1971. They have two children: Katie Beth and Matthew, four granddaughters, Greta (daughter of Katie Beth and her ex-husband Brian Layson), Kiya, Matilda "Tille”, Eleanor, and one grandson, George Matthew V "Quinn" (daughters and son of Matthew and his wife Kirstin).

== Education and early career ==
Israel attended Middle Georgia College in Cochran and the University of Georgia in Athens. However he never graduated and held no degree. He began his career as an underwriter for the life, health and accident insurance industry.

== Political career ==
In 1975, he made a sudden announcement to his family that he planned to run for a seat on the Macon City Council. Israel went door-to-door in his district to gain support for his run. A Republican in Jimmy Carter's Georgia, Israel's run for city council seemed a long shot, but he won the seat.

Israel was elected to the Macon City Council in 1975. He became a frequent critic of then Mayor Buck Melton. However, Israel later credited Melton for laying the foundation for much of the progress achieved during Israel's own tenure as the city's mayor, "I was probably his biggest critic on City Council...I spent my eight years (as mayor) apologizing to him for not understanding." Israel further praised his predecessor saying in 2014, "He had a vision for the city and changed a lot of things."

Mayor Buck Melton declined to seek a second term in 1979. Just four years after winning his first election, Israel was elected mayor of Macon in 1979, the second Republican to have won the position, the first having been the flamboyant Ronnie Thompson in 1967. Israel's success has often been attributed to the beginnings of the growth of the Reagan coalition in Georgia and the rest of the American South. He served as the state chairman of Ronald Reagan's reelection campaign and was himself reelected to the mayoral post in Macon in 1984. Israel's reelection was considerably achieved more on his merits and successes in his first term than was his first election. As a mayor, he was known for his fiscal conservatism, integrity and bi-partisan attitude.

At the end of his second term as mayor in 1987, Israel considered running for Governor of Georgia. However, Israel instead decided to return to the business sector.

== Business career ==
Following his retirement from politics, Israel became president and CEO of the Potomac Corporation, a European venture capital firm. From 1990 to 1994 he served as CEO of Fickling and Walker, a real estate company, and in 1994 he left to become CEO of the privately held Secure Health Plans of Georgia. Israel currently sits on the board of directors for YKK. He was appointed chairman and CEO of the Georgia Chamber of Commerce in 2002 and is the current holder of the post.

Israel was chosen by Georgia Trend Magazine as the 2006 GEORGIAN OF THE YEAR He has also served as chair of the Macon Chamber of Commerce and the Macon Economic Development Commission, and has also several other business and community leadership committees. He has been appointed to several state advisory boards including State of Georgia Commission on Privatization, the Georgia Military Affairs Committee and the Southern Growth Policies Board.

== Death ==
Israel died on July 26, 2026, at the age of 78.

== See also ==
Political offices
Preceded by Buck Melton	Mayor of Macon, Georgia; 1980–1987	Succeeded by Lee Robinson
