= Cowles–Woodruff House =

Historic house in Georgia, United States

- Cowles House
- U.S. National Register of Historic Places
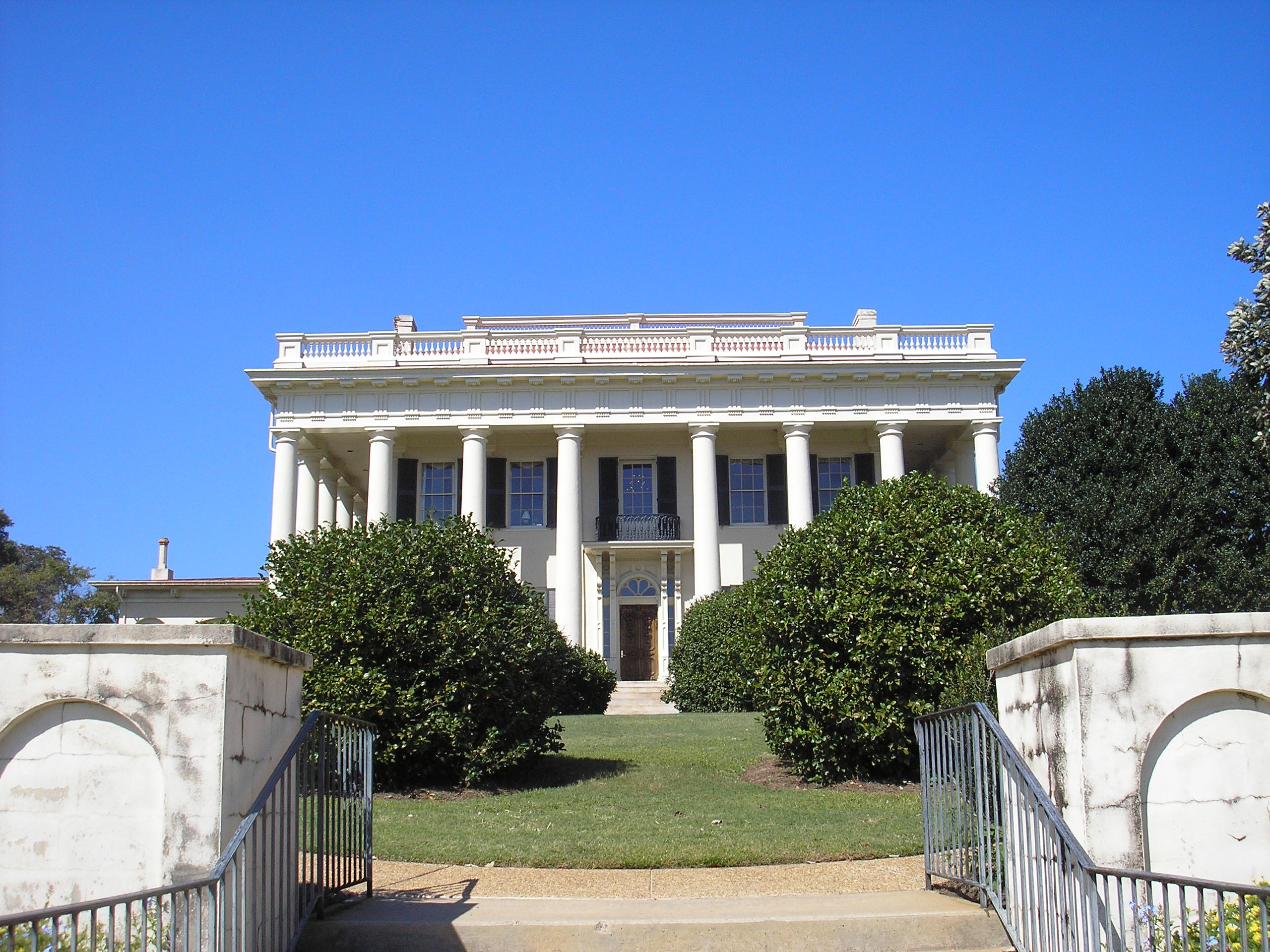

- Location within Georgia Location within the United States
- Location: 988 Bond St., Macon, Georgia
- Coordinates: 32°50′32″N 83°38′4″W
- Area: 4 acres (1.6 ha)
- Built: 1836
- Architect: Elam Alexander
- Architectural style: Greek Revival
- NRHP reference No.: 71000251
- Added to NRHP: June 21, 1971

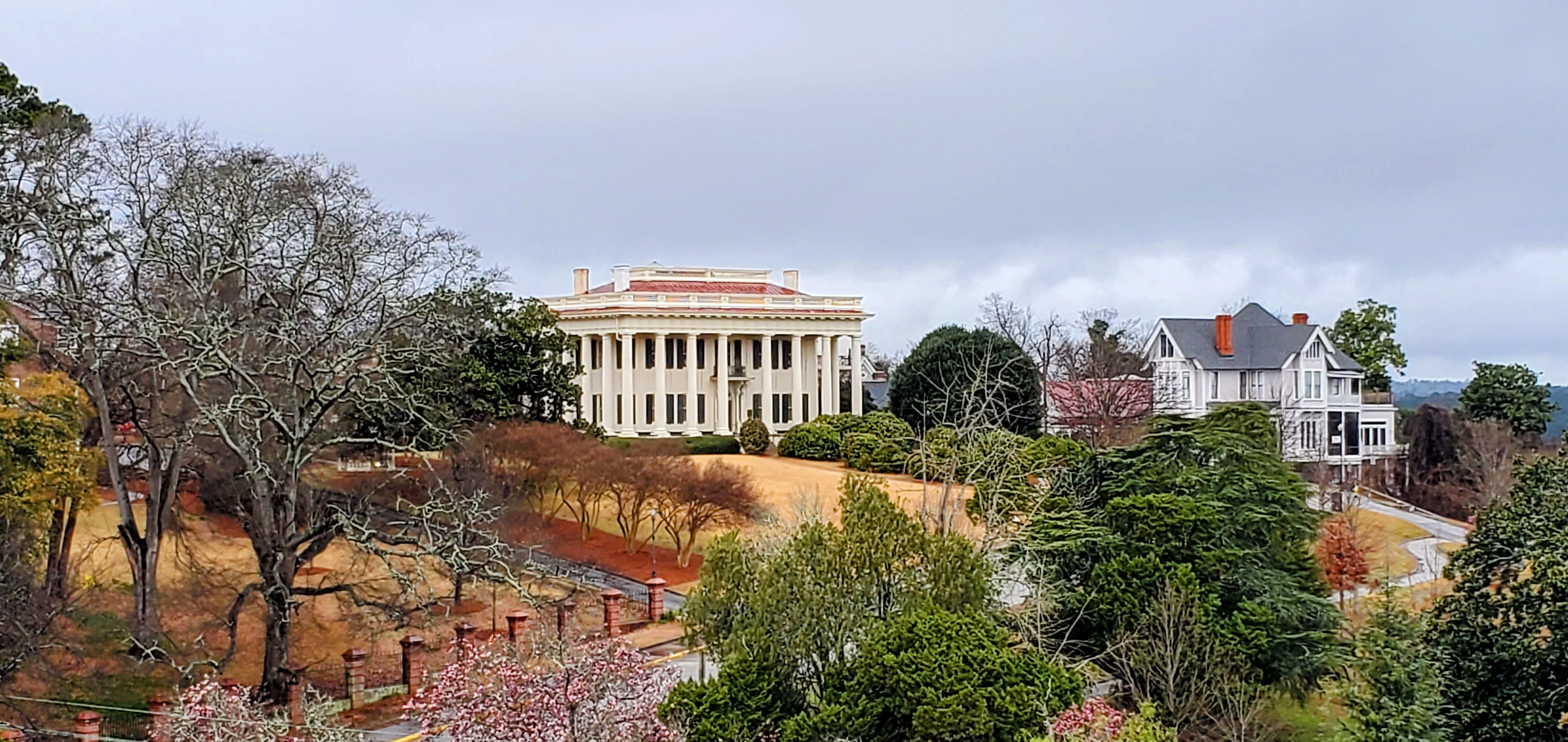
Cowles House from the copula of the Johnston-Hay House - February 2022

The Cowles–Woodruff House, listed on the National Register of Historic Places as the Cowles House and also known as the Woodruff House or the Cowles–Bond House, is owned by Mercer University in Macon, Georgia and is located at 988 Bond Street. It is an antebellum home the overlooks downtown Macon. It was used by General James H. Wilson as his residence and headquarters during the occupation of Macon by the US Army in 1864. From 1960 to 1978 it was the campus of Stratford Academy.

The mansion is named for its first two owners. It was listed on the National Register of Historic Places on June 21, 1971.

It was built in 1836 and is an example of Greek Revival architecture. It is used by the university for special events.

== See also ==
- National Register of Historic Places listings in Bibb County, Georgia
