= Gregg Doyel =

American sportswriter

- Born: Hawaii, U.S.
- Education: University of Florida
- Known for: Sports writer

Gregg Doyel is an American sports columnist for the Indianapolis Star, formerly a national sports writer for CBSSports.com.

== Early life and education ==
Gregg Doyel was born in Hawaii. He grew up in Mississippi, where his father was a law professor at the University of Mississippi. Doyel attended high school in Georgia and attended college at the University of Florida. At Stratford Academy in Macon, Georgia, he was named all-state twice in baseball (1987, 1988) for coaches Bubber Adams and Bobby Henley, and once in soccer (1986) for coach Sharad Apte.

Doyel has been named the country's top sports columnist by the Associated Press Sports Editors four times. Doyel has won 19 APSE Top 10 awards since 2007, nine for columns, including firsts in 2014, '17, '19 and '22. In 2023 he was named one of the 250 most influential business leaders in Indiana by the 'Indianapolis Business Journal''. He is an ambassador for Indiana Wish, which since 1984 has granted more than 3,500 wishes to children in 88 of the state's 92 counties.

== Journalism and broadcasting career ==
Before coming to the Star, he was a national columnist for CBSSports.com. Doyel was also the site's college basketball writer before becoming a columnist. He has written two books, titled Kentucky Wildcats: Where Have You Gone? and Coach K: Building the Duke Dynasty. Before working at Sportsline.com, he was a sports writer with the Tampa Tribune, Florida Marlins beat writer at the Miami Herald and an ACC basketball writer with the Charlotte Observer. On May 21, 2007, it was announced that Doyel would host a radio program on Cincinnati's WCKY (AM) in the 9 am – noon time slot with Mo Egger. He hosted the WCKY show until he was discharged in the wake of a budget cut on December 13, 2007. Doyel also briefly co-hosted WLW's Sunday Morning SportsTalk with Ken Broo, but voluntarily left the show because he was traveling excessively for CBSSports.com.

== Controversies ==
=== Caitlin Clark controversy (2024) ===
On April 17, 2024, during basketball player Caitlin Clark's introductory press conference with the Indiana Fever, Doyel engaged in an "uncomfortable exchange" with Clark that drew international attention; the incident occurred when Doyel made a heart gesture with his hands, mimicking Clark's signature move, stating "start doing it to me and we'll get along just fine." As a result, the Indianapolis Star banned Doyel from covering the Fever for one season, and also reportedly suspended Doyel for two weeks without pay.

== Awards ==
In January 2015, Gregg Doyel was the winner of the United States Harness Writers Association's 53rd Annual John Hervey Award for Excellence in Harness Racing Journalism. He was honored for his column on trainer/driver Verlin Yohder titled "Hey Hollywood! Another Classic Indiana Underdog Story", which appeared in the November 11, 2014 issue of the Indianapolis Star.
