= Stratford Academy =

Private school in Bibb County, Georgia, United States

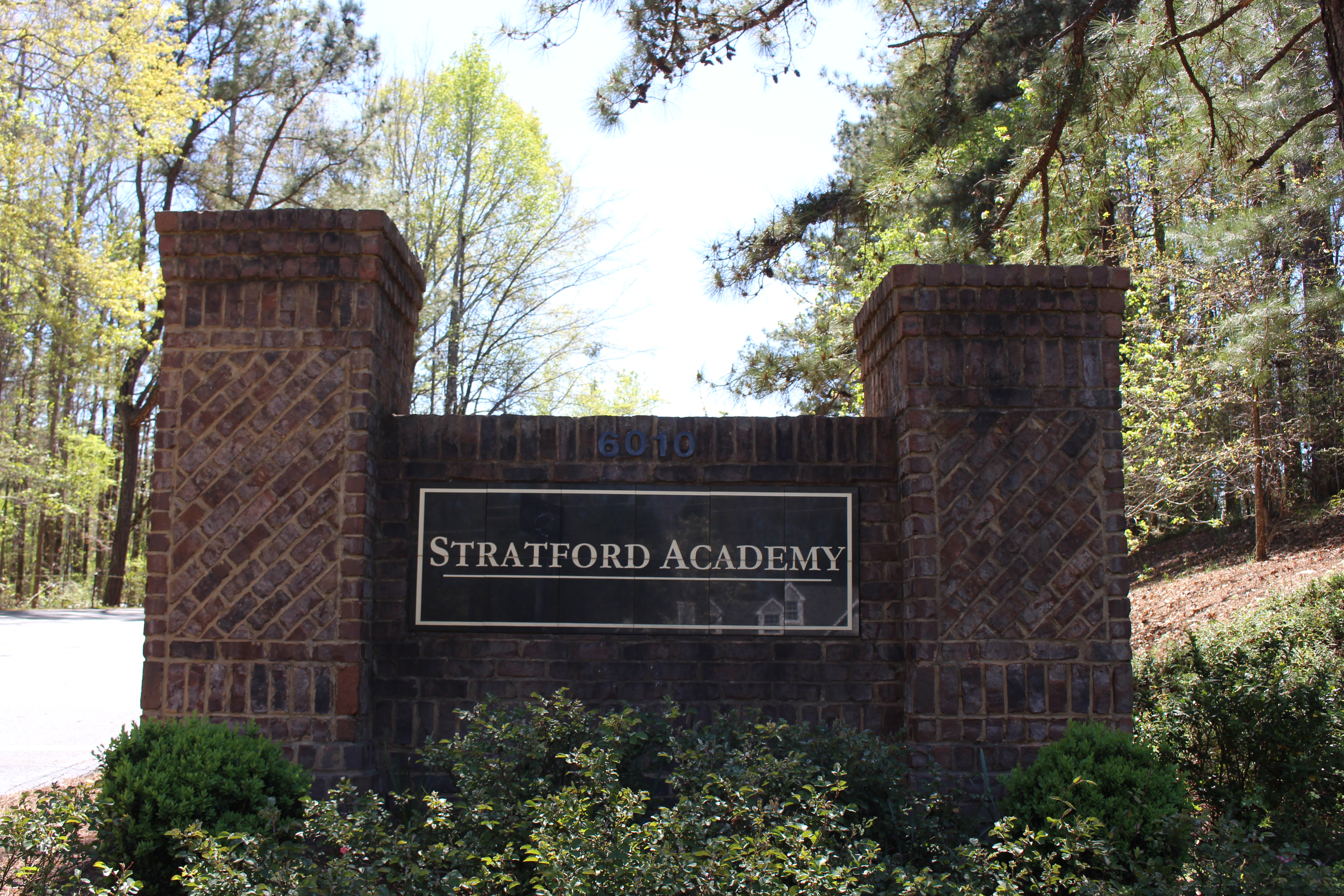
- Entrance Sign

Location
- 6010 Peake Rd; Macon, Georgia 31220; United States
- Coordinates: 32°51′41″N 83°45′18″W

Information
- Type: Private
- CEEB code: 111961
- Principal: Kathy Larsen – Preschool; Dr. Grace Adams Lower School
- Principal: Patrick Snead – Middle School
- Principal: Lori Gubernat – Upper School
- Head of school: Dr. Rachel Adams
- Faculty: 148.5
- Grades: Daycare-12
- Gender: Coeducational
- Enrollment: 834
- Student to teacher ratio: 9.5:1
- Campus size: 70 acres (28 ha)
- Colors: Blue and silver
- Athletics conference: GISA
- Team name: Eagles
- Website: www.stratford.org

Stratford Academy is a private school in Bibb County, Georgia, United States, near Macon. It opened September 1960.

The school has a controversial history as part of the segregation academy movement. As of 2017–18, approximately 21% of students were non-white. As of 2021 the National Center for Education Statistics show Stratford's total student enrollment at 834 and total classroom teachers at 82.6.

== History ==
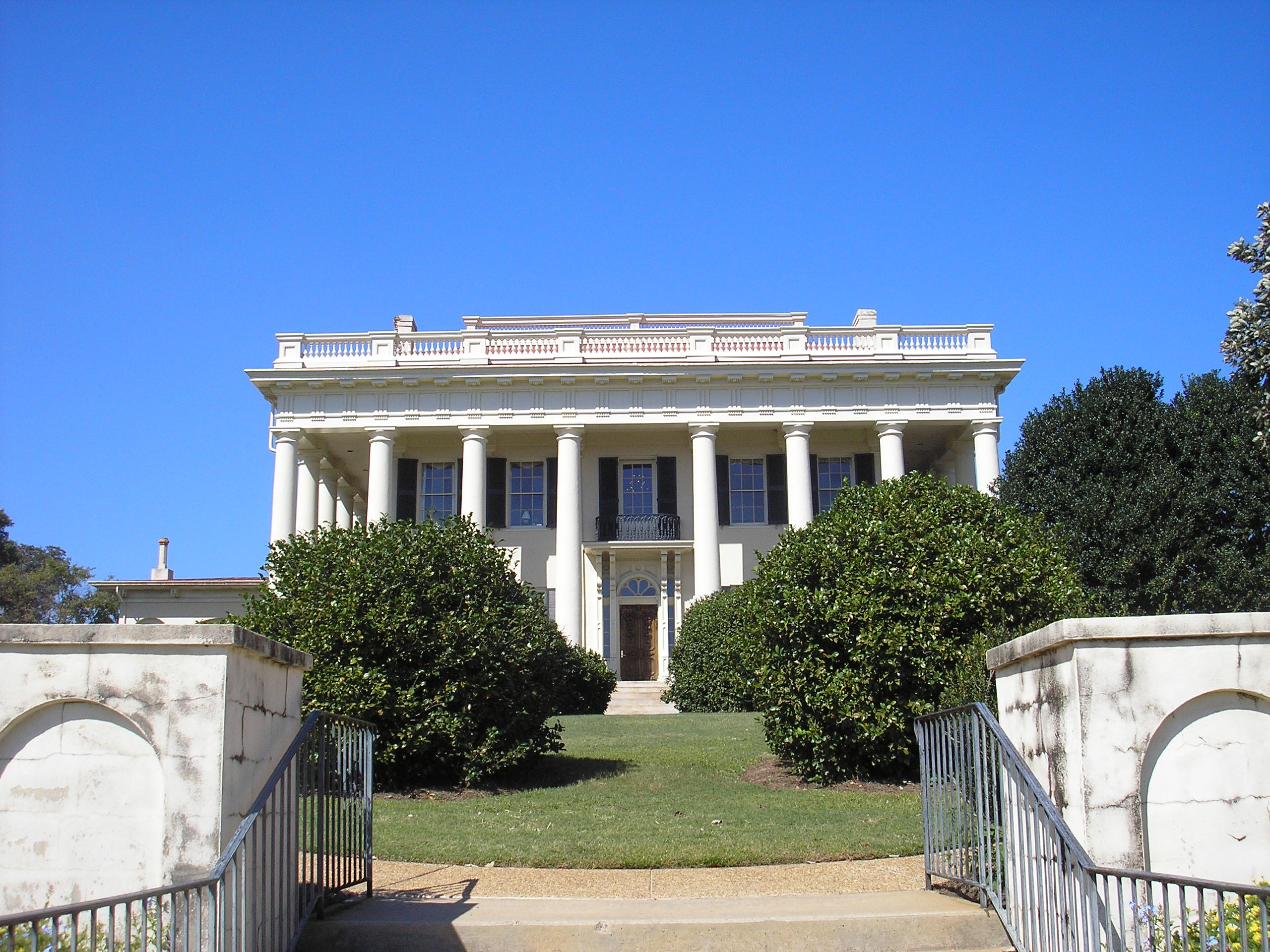
When Stratford Academy first opened in 1960, classes were held in the Cowles-Woodruff Mansion.

Stratford was founded in 1960 by a group of white parents who wished to avoid the prospect of sending their children to racially integrated public schools. The founders viewed the desegregation of Bibb County public schools as an "impending crisis." In September 1960, the school opened with 117 students and 17 faculty members in the Cowles-Woodruff House. The graduation march of the first graduating class in 1962 was Dixie, not the traditional Pomp and Circumstance.

In 1970, the school's enrollment increased by 45 percent after the Supreme Court ordered the immediate desegregation of all public schools.

In 1972, Stratford Academy was expelled from Georgia Association of Independent Schools because the school refused to cut ties with segregationists. In 1974, school leaders helped create the Southeastern Association of Independent Schools (SEAIS), which supported schools that refused to have an admissions policy that included African-American students. The school is now affiliated with the Georgia Independent School Association (GISA), which was created by the merger of GAIS and SEAIS in 1986.

In 2017 political scientist Thomas Ellington stated that schools in Macon founded between 1960 and 1972 "are remarkably different than both the public and private schools formed at other times, either before or after" insofar as "those schools are generally 5 percent or fewer African-American, in a community that's roughly 67 percent black, according to the last census". In 2002, the school's headmaster, Edward England, announced financial grants to attract minority students. At the time, the student body was 93 percent white.

The Daws Student Activities Center was dedicated in September, 2017.

== Academics ==
Stratford earned accreditation from the Southern Association of Colleges and Schools (now known as Cognia) in 1982.

== Athletics ==
In 2015, the school, whose teams are nicknamed the Eagles, joined the Georgia High School Association. In 2013 they moved to the newly formed GIAA (Georgia Independent Athletic Association). In 2021, they moved to the GISA, along with other schools in the area.

== Memberships ==
Stratford is a member of the National Association of Independent Schools (NAIS), the Southern Association of Colleges and Schools (SACS), the Georgia Independent School Association (GISA), the Southern Association of Independent Schools (SAIS), and the College Board. In 1982, Stratford was accredited by the Southern Association of Colleges and Schools and the Southern Association of Independent Schools.

== Notable alumni ==
- Russell Branyan, professional baseball player
- Quintez Cephus, professional football player
- Jonathan Dean, professional soccer player
- Russell Henley, professional golfer
- Grey Henson, Broadway actor
- Robert Reichert, mayor of Macon
- Le Kevin Smith, professional football player
- Robert Dickey, House of Representative legislator
- Dr. Mark Newton, House of Representative legislator
- Robert Trammell, House of Representative legislator
- Gregg Doyel, award-winning sports writer
