= Walker Business College =

Business college

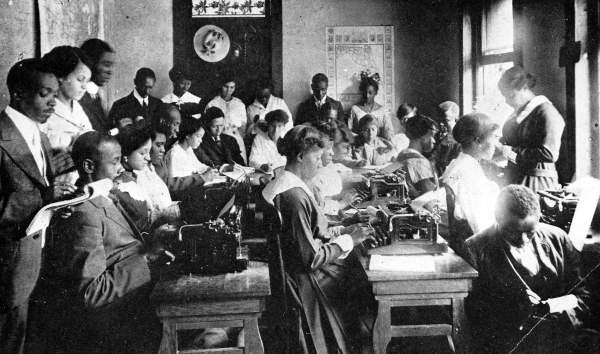
- Students of Walker Business College, c. 1916

Location
- Jacksonville, Florida, Macon, Georgia, U.S.

Information
- Former names: Walker's Commercial and Vocational College, Walker Business College for Colored, Walker's Business College
- School type: business school, vocational school
- Established: c. 1916
- Founders: Richard Wendell Walker, Julia Walker Brown
- Closed: c. 1967

Walker Business College, also known as Walker Business College for Colored, and Walker's Commercial and Vocational College, was a former business school and vocational school specifically for African Americans which was founded c. 1916 and closed c. 1967, and located in Jacksonville, Duval County, Florida, and later Macon, Georgia. The school advertised as, "the largest colored business college in the United States".

== History ==
Richard Wendell Walker was the co-founder and served as the school's first president. Richard Wendell Walker was from Kansas and he had attended Fairmont University in Wichita, and Topeka Business College in Topeka, Kansas. Julia Brown Walker, the spouse of Richard Wendell Walker, was a co-founder and also served as a secretary and president of the school. Former NAACP president and civil rights activist, Johnnie H. Goodson taught tailoring classes at the school.

Walker Business College offered both day and night classes. The courses at Walker Business College included secretarial training, office machines, bookkeeping, accounting, and insurance. The school also had a trade division and offered courses in upholstering, tailoring, dressmaking, and radio and television.

The college was located at 417-Y2 Broad Street, and later moved to 9th Street and Myrtle Avenue in Jacksonville. It later moved to 319 Broad Street, Jacksonville. In 1929, the school opened a second location in Macon, Georgia.

The Florida State Archives includes a photograph of students at the Walker Business College.
