= George Busbee =

American politician (1927-2004)

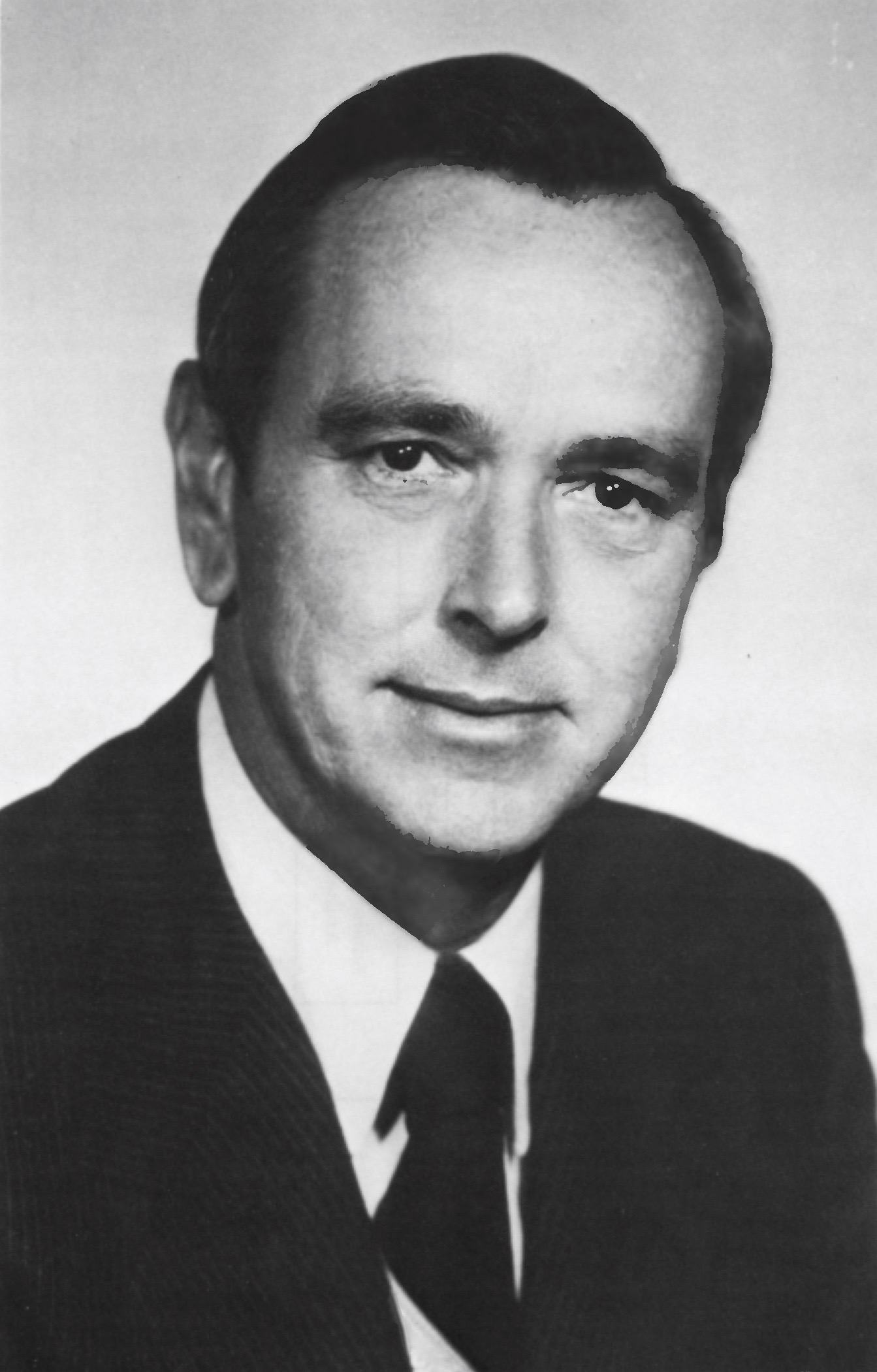
- Official portrait, 1975

77th Governor of Georgia
- In office January 14, 1975 – January 11, 1983
- Lieutenant: Zell Miller
- Preceded by: Jimmy Carter
- Succeeded by: Joe Frank Harris

Chair of the National Governors Association
- In office August 5, 1980 – August 11, 1981
- Preceded by: Otis Bowen
- Succeeded by: Richard Snelling

Member of the Georgia House of Representatives
- In office January 14, 1957 – January 13, 1975
- Preceded by: G. Stuart Watson
- Succeeded by: T. Hayward McCollum
- Constituency: Dougherty County (1957–1966); 79th district (1966–1969); 61st district (1969–1973); 114th district (1973–1975)

Personal details
- Born: George Dekle Busbee; August 7, 1927 Vienna, Georgia, U.S.
- Died: July 16, 2004 (aged 76) Savannah, Georgia, U.S.
- Resting place: Peachtree Memorial Park; Norcross, Georgia, U.S.
- Party: Democratic
- Spouse: Mary Beth Talbot (m. 1949)
- Children: 4
- Education: Abraham Baldwin Agricultural College; University of Georgia (BBA, LLB)

Military service
- Allegiance: United States
- Branch/service: United States Navy

George Dekle Busbee Sr. (August 7, 1927 – July 16, 2004) was an American politician who served as the 77th governor of Georgia from 1975 to 1983.

== Early life ==
Born in Vienna, Georgia, Busbee attended Georgia Military College and Abraham Baldwin Agricultural College before joining the U.S. Navy. After his discharge, he completed his education at the University of Georgia and its School of Law in Athens, where he was a member of the Phi Delta Theta fraternity and the Phi Kappa Literary Society, having procured a bachelor's degree in 1949 and a law degree in 1952.

== Political life ==
Establishing a law practice in Albany, Busbee served nine terms in the Georgia House of Representatives and was floor leader for Governor Carl Sanders. In 1967, Busbee was one of thirty Democrats in the legislature who voted for the Republican Howard Callaway in the disputed 1966 gubernatorial race, rather than the Democratic nominee Lester Maddox, a segregationist from Atlanta. The legislature, acting under the 1824 Georgia Constitution, upheld by the United States Supreme Court, chose Maddox 182 to 66.

In 1974, Busbee won the Democratic nomination for governor in Jimmy Carter's final year in that office. In the party runoff, he defeated, 551,106 (59.9 percent) to 369,608 (40.1 percent), former governor and sitting Lieutenant Governor Lester Maddox, the man whom Busbee had voted against in the legislative election for governor some seven years earlier. In the fall of 1974, Busbee handily defeated Ronnie Thompson, the first Republican to have served as mayor of Macon.

Two years later voters approved a wholesale revision of the Georgia Constitution. As a result of these changes, Busbee became the state's first governor to serve two consecutive four-year terms. Lt. Gov. Zell Miller, who wanted to run for governor in 1978, opposed the constitutional amendment, but it was carried anyway. Busbee won election to his second term in 1978 with an easy victory over Republican Rodney Cook of Atlanta.

== Personal life ==
After his service as governor, Busbee joined the Atlanta law firm King & Spalding and moved to the Atlanta suburb of Duluth.

Busbee was married to the former Mary Elizabeth "Mary Beth" Talbot (1927–2012), originally from Ruston in north Louisiana. The sixth child of a country physician, Dr. and Mrs. B. H. Talbot, she graduated from Louisiana Tech University with a Bachelor of Science degree in biological sciences and also did graduate work in pathology at Charity Hospital in New Orleans. She moved to Georgia to work as a medical technician at Athens General Hospital in Athens, where she met George Busbee, then a law student. In 1952, they relocated to Albany, where they remained until his inauguration as governor in January 1975. As First Lady of Georgia, Mrs. Busbee was known for her emphasis on volunteerism. In 1985, she co-authored a cookbook, Guess Who's Coming to Dinner, about favorite recipes and guests served at the governor's mansion during her eight years there. Mrs. Busbee was a 40-year cancer survivor.

The Busbees had four children, Beth Kindt and husband John, Jan Curtis and husband Carlton, George D. Busbee, Jr., and wife Tammy, and Jeff Busbee and wife Kelly. After the governorship, the Busbees started a church in their Duluth home. That congregation is now the Parkway Baptist Church.

== Death and legacy ==
Busbee died of a heart attack on July 16, 2004, at the Savannah International Airport in Savannah. George Busbee Parkway and Busbee Drive in the Town Center Area Community Improvement District of Cobb County are named in his honor, as is Busbee Hall at the University of Georgia and the Busbee Center at Gwinnett Technical College.

Party political offices
Preceded by Jimmy Carter	Democratic nominee for Governor of Georgia; 1974, 1978	Succeeded by Joe Frank Harris
Political offices
Preceded by Jimmy Carter	Governor of Georgia; 1975–1983	Succeeded by Joe Frank Harris
Preceded by Otis R. Bowen	Chair of the National Governors Association; 1980–1981	Succeeded by Richard A. Snelling
