= Lee Robinson (politician) =

American mayor

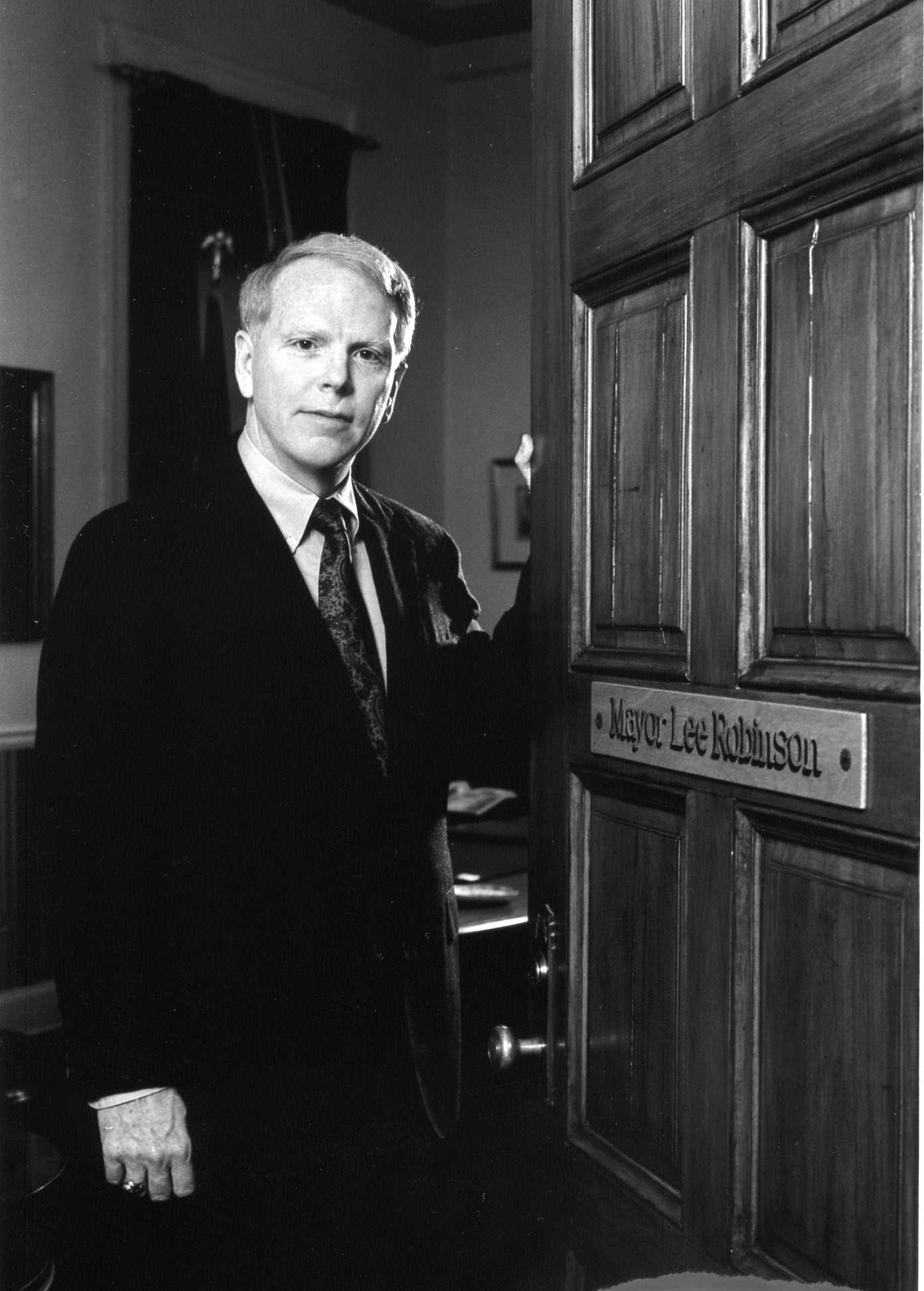
- William Lee Robinson

Mayor of Macon, Georgia
- In office December 14, 1987 – December 11, 1991
- Preceded by: George Israel
- Succeeded by: Tommy Olmstead

Personal details
- Born: September 25, 1943 Rome, Georgia
- Died: November 4, 2015 (aged 72) Macon, Georgia
- Party: Democratic

William Lee Robinson (September 24, 1943 – November 4, 2015) was an American politician who was the Mayor of Macon, Georgia from 1987–1991, and a four-term State Senator of Georgia. At the time of his death, Lee Robinson was serving as the Circuit Public Defender of the Macon (Georgia) Judicial Circuit, which includes Bibb, Peach and Crawford Counties.

== Early years ==
Born on September 24, 1943, in Rome, Georgia, Lee Robinson attended Bibb County Public Schools. He graduation from Lanier High School, then attended Georgia Tech where he graduated with a degree in Industrial Management.

== Military service ==
After college, Robinson enlisted in the U.S. Army under the college option program. Following basic training, he attended Infantry Officer Candidate School at Fort Benning, Georgia, where he finished on the Commandant's List and attended Airborne School. As a commissioned second lieutenant, Robinson received command of a platoon of the 173d Airborne Brigade in Viet Nam. While in Viet Nam, Robinson was awarded three Bronze Star Medals, the Army Commendation Medal, Vietnam Service Medal and the Combat Infantry Badge. After returning from Viet Nam, Robinson was promoted to captain and commanded a 600-man headquarters company at Fort Stewart, Georgia. The second award of the Army Commendation Medal recognized his performance.

Although actively pursuing a civilian career, Robinson continued to serve the nation in the United States Army Reserve and in 1975 was promoted to major. Robinson, a parachute rigger, commanded the 421st Quartermaster Company (Air Delivery) in Fort Valley, Georgia, for four years. The award of the Meritorious Service Medal recognized this paratrooper's performance over the four years he served as the Commanding Officer of the 421st.

In September 1985, Robinson was promoted to lieutenant colonel. From July 1986 to August 1988, he commanded the 352nd Maintenance Battalion on Riverside Drive in Macon. Robinson received a second award of the Meritorious Service Medal in recognition of this highly successful command. Robinson then returned to Headquarters 81st Army Reserve Command where he served as the Maintenance Division Chief and subsequently as the Assistant Deputy Chief of Staff of Logistics. He was presented with his third award of the Meritorious Service Medal for noteworthy achievement during Operation Desert Shield, when more than fifty reserve units from Georgia were mobilized. Robinson was promoted to colonel in September 1990, and assumed command of the 3294th United States Army Reserve Forces School on Riverside Drive in Macon. In September 1993, he relinquished command of the School and assumed responsibility of Deputy Chief of Staff for Logistics with the 81st Army Reserve Command in East Point, Georgia.

As part of downsizing the 81st Army Reserve Command (ARCOM) and other ARCOMs in the South Eastern United States were combined to become the 81st Regional Support Command (RSC) which now had responsibility for five states. Robinson was selected as the Deputy Chief of Staff for Logistics for the new RSC and remained at that post until being selected to command Headquarters Third United States Army (Augmentation). This troop program unit is an integral part of the Third Army. Colonel Robinson served as commander for deployment and redeployment of Bright Star 97, one of this country's most important Southwest Asia military exercises. The Commander of Third Army, General Tommy Franks, awarded him an impact Meritorious Service Medal in recognition of superior performance during Bright Star 1997. Colonel Robinson relinquished command and retired from the active reserve in 1999. The Commander of Third United States Army awarded him the Legion of Merit for his noteworthy and exemplary service to the nation. Colonel Robinson also received the second award of the Legion of Merit for exceptionally meritorious service to his nation from First United States Army, upon recommendation of the 81st Regional Support Command. Colonel Robinson was inducted into the United States Army Officer Candidate School Hall of Fame on April 6, 2001.

== Hardware business ==
After leaving the active military, Robinson worked for a time in the family hardware business, Robinson Hardware. He later served on the board of directors of the Greater Macon Chamber of Commerce. The business was sold in December 1986.

== Georgia State Senate ==
In 1974, at age 31, Robinson was elected to the Georgia State Senate where he authored the "Sunset Law", designed to abolish state agencies and boards that cannot prove their worth. Robinson also advocated public initiative and open government reform during his four terms (eight years) in office. In 1982, Robinson left the State Senate to begin study towards a joint law/business degree at Mercer University's Walter F. George School of Law and Eugene W. Stetson School of Business and Economics; he graduated in 1985 with both a Juris Doctor (JD) and a Masters in Business Administration (MBA). He later graduated from the United States Army War College in 1993

== Mayor of Macon, Georgia ==
Robinson served as Macon's mayor from 1987 to 1991. During his term, Macon developed a War-on-Drugs program, which was subsequently copied by communities around the nation. Mayor Robinson introduced strategic planning and strategic management systems including the Quality Labor Force Council and the Mayor's Housing Council. Another initiative, the Junior City Council, educated local high school students in governmental affairs.

== Private practice of law ==
After serving as Mayor, Lee Robinson returned to the practice of law in Macon as a sole practitioner in the fields of both domestic law and criminal defense. Robinson was an active member of the Indigent Defense panel of attorneys who defended indigent defendants in Bibb County. He was often appointed to represent defendants who were mentally ill. This experience led him to seek to establish a Mental Health Court in Bibb County when he was later appointed Circuit Public Defender for the Macon Judicial Circuit. While in private practice, Robinson was active in the Macon Sertoma Club and served as president of M.A.C.D.L., the Macon Association of Criminal Defense Lawyers. Robinson later served part-time as Judge of the Macon Municipal Court, prior to being selected as The Circuit Public Defender for the Macon Judicial Circuit.

== Circuit public defender ==
In 2004 Lee Robinson was selected as the Circuit Public Defender of the Macon Judicial Circuit, which includes Bibb, Peach and Crawford Counties. Robinson was presented the Justice Robert Benham Award for Community Service by the State Bar of Georgia and the Chief Justice's Commission on Professionalism. Lee Robinson was the founding president of the Georgia Association of Circuit Public Defenders, an organization established to provide an independent voice of the Circuit Public Defenders to the public and the Georgia General Assembly. Lee has seventeen Assistant Public Defenders working on his team now, and anticipates eighteen Assistant Public Defenders when the office is fully staffed.

Robinson was selected as the inaugural president of the Georgia Association of Circuit Public Defenders at its organizational meeting on February 26, 2005. The association's mission is to promote the interests of and issues that concern the various Circuit Public Defenders and Conflict Defenders throughout the State of Georgia. Among many accomplishments, Robinson's tenure is perhaps most significant in that he was instrumental in ushering a "for cause" standard for removal of Circuit Public Defenders, thereby offering much needed protection from political and other pressures. Another important milestone during Robinson's leadership was the selection of a Circuit Public Defender to serve as the Circuit Public Defenders' representative on the Georgia Public Defender Standards Council. With no protocol in place, Robinson provided valuable guidance in designing the procedure for this selection that remains in place today. Robinson also championed development of a legislative committee to engage in advocacy with the legislature and advance the causes of Circuit Public Defenders before that body. Robinson's importance to the development of the Georgia Association of Circuit Public Defenders can be seen by his continued presence on the Executive Committee by each succeeding president.

While working as a Circuit Public Defender, Lee was recognized by the State Bar with the Justice Robert Benham Awards for Community Service.

== Community service ==
Lee Robinson was also active in community service. He was chairman of the board of directors of Macon's Cherry Blossom Festival, past chairman of the board of governors of the Georgia Chapter of the Alzheimer's Association and past president of the board of directors of the Central Georgia Office of the Alzheimer's Association. Robinson was past president of the Macon Association of Criminal Defense Lawyers (MACDL) and was presented the Hugh Q. Wallace award for distinguished service in the criminal defense of indigent clients. He was also a member of the Georgia Association of Criminal Defense Lawyers (GACDL).

== Personal life ==
Robinson was married to Irene Scales Robinson. The couple had two children. Robinson was a licensed pilot and held a Flight Instructor Certificate.

== Death ==
Lee Robinson died on November 4, 2015, from colon cancer.

Political offices
Preceded by George Israel	Mayor of Macon, Georgia; 1988–1991	Succeeded by Tommy Olmstead
