= Joe Frank Harris =

American politician (born 1936)

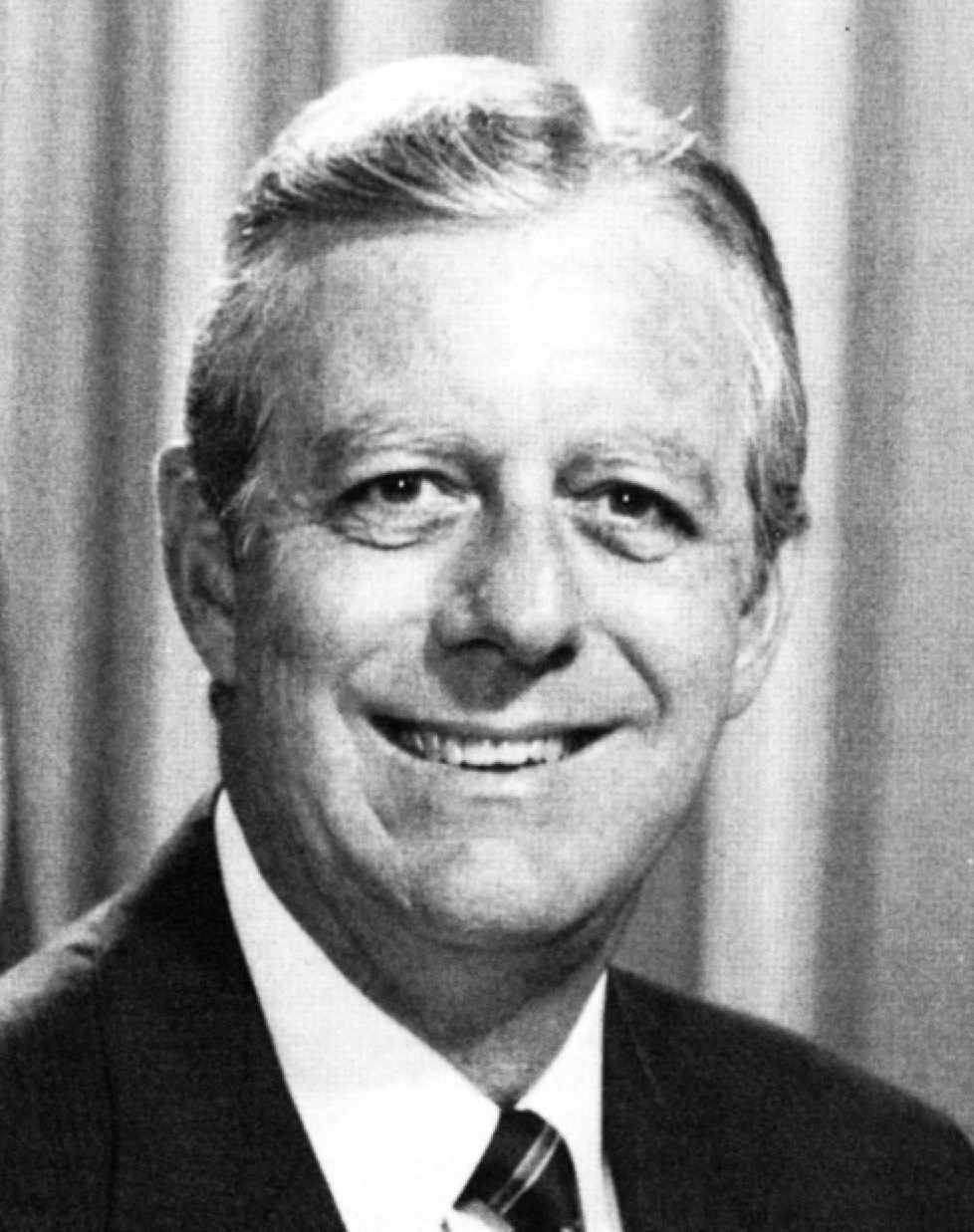
- Harris in 1985

78th Governor of Georgia
- In office January 11, 1983 – January 14, 1991
- Lieutenant: Zell Miller
- Preceded by: George Busbee
- Succeeded by: Zell Miller

Personal details
- Born: Joseph Franklin Harris; February 16, 1936 (age 90) Cartersville, Georgia, U.S.
- Party: Democratic
- Spouse: Elizabeth Carlock
- Education: Asbury University (attended); University of Georgia (BS)

Military service
- Allegiance: United States
- Branch: Georgia Air National Guard
- Service years: 1953–1958

Joseph Franklin Harris (born February 16, 1936) is an American businessman and Democratic politician who served as the 78th governor of Georgia from 1983 to 1991. Before becoming governor he worked at his family's cement business and served nine terms in the Georgia House of Representatives.

== Early life and career ==
Harris was born in the Atco Mill Village of Cartersville, Georgia, to Frank and Frances Harris. Harris was the second of three children with brother Fred Harris and sister Glenda Harris Gambill.

Harris attended Asbury College for one year, then went on to graduate from the University of Georgia in 1958 with a degree in business administration. While attending Georgia, he became a member of Lambda Chi Alpha fraternity.

Upon graduation, Harris returned to his native Cartersville, Georgia to join his father Frank and brother Fred in the family run cement business. Harris Cement Products, Inc. operated from 1940 to 1980, and during the late 1970s furnished all the cement for the bridges and overpasses constructed on Interstate 75 from Cobb County to Gordon County.

Harris was persuaded to run for the Georgia House of Representatives in 1964 and served nine terms from January 3, 1965 to January 11, 1983. Harris became the chairman of the Appropriations Committee in 1974. Since the death of former Georgia Governor and former US President Jimmy Carter on December 29, 2024, Joe Frank Harris is the earliest serving and oldest living governor of Georgia.

== Gubernatorial campaign ==
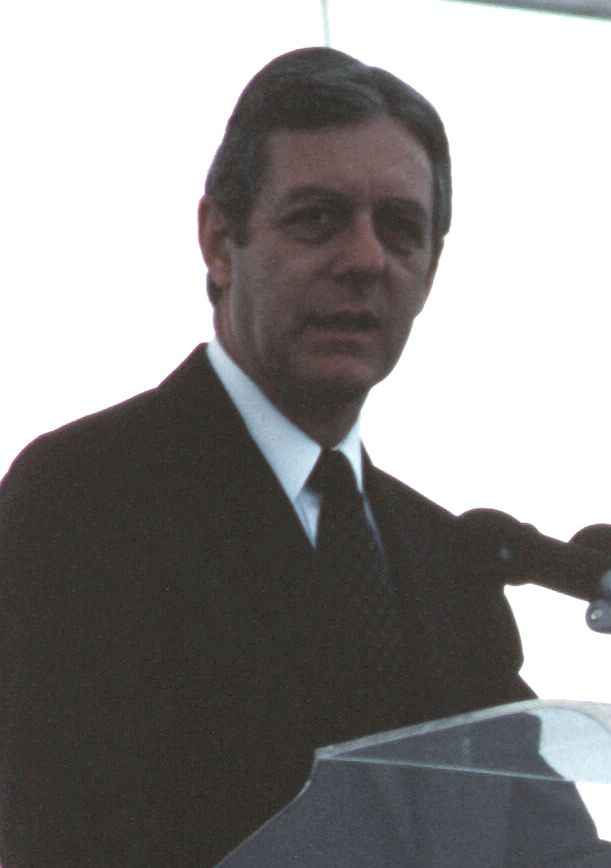
Harris speaking at the commissioning ceremony for the USS Georgia in 1984

When he ran for governor in 1982, Harris was seen as a long-shot candidate, but with the support of the Speaker of the Georgia House Tom Murphy, he was able to win the primary over U.S. Representative Bo Ginn. Deloss Walker, a political campaign consultant based in Memphis, Tennessee, played a key role in his campaign. Attorney Ike Wayne Reece from Atlanta, GA acted as Harris's executive campaign manager, later to become the General Counsel to the Democratic Party of Georgia.

== Gubernatorial accomplishments ==
Harris called himself the education governor as he raised the state salaries for teachers. and implemented the Quality Basic Education Act (QBE), built the Georgia Dome, created the Technical College System of Georgia formerly known as the Department of Adult & Technical Education, and lured the 1996 Summer Olympics to Atlanta. Harris is also credited with building more libraries during his term than any other governor in Georgia's history. Also during his term, Harris created the Growth Strategies Commission chaired by Cartersville native and prominent developer Joel Cowan. His fiscal strategies resulted in higher bond ratings for the state and during his governorship Georgia was rated among the country's top 15 best-managed states by Financial World.

== Board of regents ==
After two terms as governor, Harris was appointed to the Board of Regents for the University System of Georgia serving for seven years, two years as chairman.

== Georgia State University ==
From 1995 through 2009, Harris served at Georgia State University as an executive fellow and lecturer in the School of Policy Studies. He is chairman of the board of Harris Georgia Corporation, an industrial development firm that was established in 1980 in Cartersville, Georgia. He also served on the board of directors for Aflac from 1991 to 2011.

== Legacy ==
The portion of U.S. Route 41 through Bartow County is named in his honor (Joe Frank Harris Parkway), as well as the Joe Frank Harris Commons that houses The Village Summit Dining Commons at the University of Georgia, the main entrance to the Georgia Ports Authority in Brunswick, Georgia (Joe Frank Harris Blvd.), and the main entrance to the Georgia State Fairgrounds in Perry (Governor Joe Frank and Mrs. Elizabeth Harris Blvd.).

== See also ==
- New Georgia Encyclopedia Article.
- Appearances on C-SPAN

Party political offices
Preceded by George Busbee	Democratic nominee for Governor of Georgia; 1982, 1986	Succeeded by Zell Miller
Political offices
Preceded by George Busbee	Governor of Georgia; 1983-1991	Succeeded by Zell Miller
U.S. order of precedence (ceremonial)
Preceded by Martha McSally as Former U.S. Senator	Order of precedence of the United States; Within Georgia	Succeeded by Roy Barnes as Former Governor
Preceded by Phil Murphy as Former Governor	Order of precedence of the United States; Outside Georgia	Succeeded by Roy Barnes as Former Governor
