= Ronnie Thompson (politician) =

American musician and politician (1934–2020)

- Thompson during the 1960s

Mayor of Macon, Georgia
- In office November 1967 – 1975
- Preceded by: Benjamin Franklin Merritt Jr.
- Succeeded by: Buck Melton

Personal details
- Born: July 21, 1934 Augusta, Georgia, U.S.
- Died: March 22, 2020 (aged 85)
- Party: Republican; Democratic
- Profession: Singer musician politician counselor

Ronald John "Ronnie" Thompson Sr. (July 21, 1934 – March 22, 2020), also known by "Machine Gun Ronnie" Thompson, was an American gospel singer, politician, musician, and mental health caseworker. During the 1960s, Thompson became a household name across Georgia and parts of the American South for his live gospel music television shows. He also recorded and released his own contemporary Christian and country music albums and singles. In 1967, Thompson was elected Mayor of Macon, Georgia, becoming the city's first Republican mayor in its history. He became known for his unorthodox, often controversial, views and colorful, charismatic personality during his tenure as mayor, which spanned two terms from 1967 to 1975.

== Biography ==
Thompson was born in Augusta, Georgia, on July 21, 1934, to Remus Warren Thompson and Mattie Lou (nee Watkins). His family, who originally worked with the cotton mills, lived in poverty. Thompson's father sang in an Augusta-based quartet, which started an interest in music early in life. By his own admission, Thompson was raised as a segregationist until he was 11-years old, when he encountered a black boy who was crying because he was not allowed to use a whites-only bathroom at a rest area in Sparta, Georgia.

Ronnie Thompson joined the United States Air Force. He was honorably discharged but remained at Robins Air Force Base, where he entertained as a member of a gospel quartet. He formed his own group, the Ronnie Thompson Quartet, by 1955.

In addition to his work in gospel, Ronnie Thompson also released several Contemporary Christian and country music albums and other recordings during the era, including a single alluding to his future political career called "City Slicks and Politics". His first country album was released in 1958. Observers and journalists have speculated that Thompson would have become a prominent, famous musician or entertainer had he lived elsewhere. However, Thompson still became a regional household name, especially in Georgia and North Carolina, due to his series of gospel music shows, which were broadcast on local television stations throughout the 1960s. In 1960, then-Georgia Governor Ernest Vandiver publicly praised Thompson for holding several live gospel shows at a state mental hospital in Milledgeville, Georgia.

Thompson also became friends with regional and national musicians of the time, including the Allman Brothers and Otis Redding. He was also friends with James Brown. Both Brown and Thompson had grown up in Augusta and worked as shoe shiners as kids in their hometown but didn't meet until they each had moved to Macon. Thompson sometimes accompanied Brown on his tours to help with security and police escorts. Ronnie Thompson would later record a country album, called "Here I Am", with James Brown's record company, Starday Records. Though "Here I Am" had a limited release, Thompson's album came with a "A James Brown Production" logo due to its production at Starday, making it a rare vinyl record collectible item.

Thompson also worked a traveling jewelry salesman before settling in Macon, Georgia, where he expanded his jewelry business.

=== Early political career ===
Thompson's ongoing success in the music industry led to an interest in politics during the 1960s. Prior to running for office, Louisiana Governor Jimmie Davis advised Thompson that the key to a successful political career was to "sing softly and carry a big guitar."

In 1961, Thompson ran for office for the first for a vacant seat on the Bibb County Commission, but lost the election. However, two years later, Macon Mayor Benjamin Merritt encouraged Thompson to run for an alderman seat on the Macon City Council. This time, Ronnie Thompson defeated incumbent alderman Bert Hamilton in the nonpartisan city election to win the seat on the council. He served on city council until he was elected Mayor of Macon in 1967.

=== Mayor of Macon ===
In 1967, Ronnie Thompson, who was 33-years old, announced his campaign against his former political mentor, incumbent Mayor Benjamin Merritt, who was seeking re-election. Unusually, Thompson ran for mayor as a Republican, in a city and region dominated by Democrats at the time as well as the fact that Thompson was formerly a Democrat. Thompson narrowly won the election with 14,732 votes, while Mayor Merritt garnered 13,002 votes. Thompson made history by becoming Macon's first Republican mayor in its history.

Ronnie Thompson's 1967 mayoral campaign was supported by several of his colleagues in the music industry. Otis Redding and Phil Walden, the founder of Macon-based Capricorn Records, gave Thompson space in the Redwal Music Building on Cotton Avenue for use as a campaign headquarters. Redding, who had worked with Thompson, died in a plane crash on December 10, 1967, a little more than one month after Thompson had been inaugurated as Macon's mayor. Mayor Thompson quickly renamed and rededicated one of Macon's bridges as the "Otis Redding Bridge" in the singer's memory.

He won re-election to a second term in 1971 when he defeated Democrat F. Emory Greene, a Bibb County commissioner and former member of the Georgia House of Representatives.

When Thompson was sworn in as mayor shortly after the 1967 election, he presided over a city still in the midst of the Civil Rights Movement, as well as the racial tensions that gripped the South at the time. Thompson attempted to navigate the issue of race by focusing largely on law and order issues during his early years, as well as chairing the Macon City Council Library Committee, which opened the library to African-Americans for the first time. However, in 1970, Thompson issued a controversial "shoot to kill" for city police against an upcoming demonstration by the Black Liberation Front, which planned to picket downtown stores, citing the need to combat "lawlessness and anarchy." At another point in his tenure, Thompson floated the idea of arming 1,000 "volunteer lawmen" in the event of civil violence, but the idea was never fulfilled and no one was ever recruited. Critics, including other elected officials in Macon's city government, attacked the idea, noting that it could inflame the present racial tensions.

The issue of race in Macon erupted again in 1971, when a white police officer shot and killed a black city employee. Just one month after the shooting, the police officer was cleared of involuntary manslaughter. In response to the manslaughter clearance, race riots erupted in Macon on June 20, 1971, which included several suspected fire bombings. Mayor Thompson issued a 36-hour, dusk-to-dawn curfew and went on patrol with the city's police. During the unrest, a police officer called dispatch to report that he had been shot by a sniper near the intersection of Broadway and Greter Streets. Thompson went to the scene of the shooting with Macon's city police chief. There, Mayor Thompson fired a carbine long gun at the house where the sniper was believed to be hiding, though no one was ever apprehended for the shooting. News accounts erroneously reported that Thompson had fired a submachine gun at the sniper's location, while Thompson told the media that "I could hear bullets whizzing by me," which he later admitted was an exaggeration of the actual events. Thompson would also later tell a reporter that "machine gun" sounded "more colorful" than the carbine long gun he had actually used at the scene. Thompson also placed billboards around Macon, warning that criminals and rioters would be shot during the unrest.

Critics blasted Thompson for inserting himself into the crime scene unnecessarily and derisively called him "Machine Gun Ronnie", despite the fact that he never used a machine gun. In a 2010 interview, Thompson defended his actions and the "shoot to kill" orders he issued as a deterrence against potential violence, citing the damage caused by the 1970 Augusta riot a year earlier, in which six black men were shot and killed by police. He told The Macon Telegraph, "The people who put me in the same category as George Wallace don't know me...I got my reputation because I didn't want people to burn the city down."

Still, the "Machine Gun Ronnie" nickname, which Thompson never actively opposed, stuck and remained with him for the rest of his political career. Thompson even used the name to his advantage on the campaign trail by selling election model machine guns with his name "Thompson" printed on them. Months later, Thompson was re-elected to a second term as mayor.

In another memorable episode, Thompson authorized the city to acquire a U.S. Army surplus armored personnel carrier for two hundred dollars in May 1973. Opponents of the purchase called it "Thompson's Tank", and Thompson later nicknamed the vehicle "Winky Tink." The tank was never used in law enforcement, but Thompson mused about adding a cannon and a .50-caliber machine gun to the vehicle to guard against future riots.

The events of the 1971 riots and the tank acquisition overshadowed some of Ronnie Thompson's accomplishments. He introduced official non-discriminatory hiring practices for the first time. Thompson oversaw a series of major infrastructure upgrades during his two terms in office, including the paving and renovation of seventy-seven city streets. He was a leading supporter of the 14,000 seat Macon Coliseum multi-purpose arena, which opened in 1968 at a cost of $4.5 million soon after he became mayor. Ronnie Thompson also led the modernization of city hospitals, upgraded Macon's regional airports, library expansions, and campaigned for new industrial development. Thompson, who campaigned on the importance of law and order, expanded the Macon Police Department from 168 officers to 242 officers, and the Macon Fire Department from 181 to 287 firefighters. His successor, former Mayor Buck Melton, credited Thompson with saving and restoring many of Macon's larger old buildings. Thompson, who had met former President Dwight D. Eisenhower at a golf course in Augusta, led the effort to name the Eisenhower Parkway, which runs through the city's south side, after the former president.

Throughout his time as mayor, Thompson hosted his own radio talk show and wrote a column for the Macon Herald, a weekly newspaper.

Ronnie Thompson unsuccessfully ran for higher office while serving as mayor. In 1972, Thompson ran unopposed for the Republican nomination for the U.S. House of Representatives but was defeated in the general election by incumbent Democratic U.S. Representative W. S. Stuckey Jr. Two years later, in 1974, Georgia Governor Jimmy Carter was term-limited and could not run for re-election. Thompson won the Republican gubernatorial nomination but lost to Democratic nominee George Busbee in the 1974 general election. Busbee handily defeated Thompson 69.1% to 30.9%.

Thompson left office in 1975 after two terms and was succeeded by Mayor Buck Melton.

Thompson's time as mayor left an impression that many in the political realm still remembered years after he left office. Jim Marshall, who was Macon's mayor from 1995 to 1999, recalled being asked about Thompson by other mayors when he served on the United States Conference of Mayors' executive committee in the 1990s, over two decades after Thompson had left office, "And one mayor of Macon was well known: Ronnie Thompson...Not necessarily for good reasons, but some mayors actually had stories about him, what, almost 25 years later?" Marshall said he did not know Thompson until long after his political life had ended, "But in his later life, I did meet him and he seemed like an awfully decent person. And I really enjoyed his company."

=== Later life and career ===
Ronnie Thompson lived a much more private life after leaving elected politics in 1975. He wrote a column for the Macon News until 1983, when that newspaper merged with the Macon Telegraph.

Thompson largely left politics to focus on his education and a new career after leaving politics. In a 2010 interview with The Telegraph, he stated, "When I came out of the mayor's office, I only had a high school degree." He eventually became a mental health caseworker and community support services counselor at the River Edge Behavioral Health Center in Macon, where he supervised thirty-five patients with mental illness per day. Thompson taught social skills and management to patients to help them better navigate society.

According to Thompson, he became interested in mental health services when he met and befriended a mentally handicapped man nicknamed "Bullfrog" before becoming Macon's mayor. Racial tensions were simmering in Macon throughout the 1960s. At the time, a group of white Macon residents forcibly put Bullfrog, who was black, on a bus to Detroit, Michigan, to deport the man from the city, which they derisively called a "one-way freedom ride". The whites forced Bullfrog to carry a letter addressed to Detroit Mayor Jerome Cavanagh, a supporter of the Civil Rights Movement, referring to Bullfrog as a "typical black" who should join the 60,000 Detroiters who were unemployed at the time. Thompson, then a city alderman, called Mayor Cavanagh to apologize and paid for a bus ticket to bring Bullfrog back to Macon.

Additionally, Thompson also worked nights at the Crest Lawn Funeral Home in Macon. His night shifts, which were typically quiet, allowed him the flexibility to complete both his associates degree and his bachelor's degree. By 2010, Thompson was working on his master's degree in addiction studies to help with his full-time career at the River Edge Behavioral Health Center. He suffered a minor stroke in the summer of 2009, which forced him to take two months off from work and his education.

Ronnie Thompson died from Alzheimer's disease on March 22, 2020, at the age of 85.

== Electoral history ==
Georgia's 8th congressional district:

| Year | Republican | Votes | % | Democratic | Votes | % |
| 1972 | Ronnie Thompson | 42,986 | 37.6% | √ W. S. Stuckey Jr. | 71,283 | 62.4% |

Georgia gubernatorial election, 1974
| Party | Candidate | Votes | % | ±% |
|---|---|---|---|---|
| Democratic | George Busbee | 646,777 | 69.07% | |
| Republican | Ronnie Thompson | 289,113 | 30.87% | |
| Democratic hold | | Swing | | |

Party political offices
| Preceded by Hal Suit | Republican nominee for Governor of Georgia; 1974 | Succeeded by Rodney Mims Cook Sr. |
