= C. Jack Ellis =

Politician and United States Army soldier

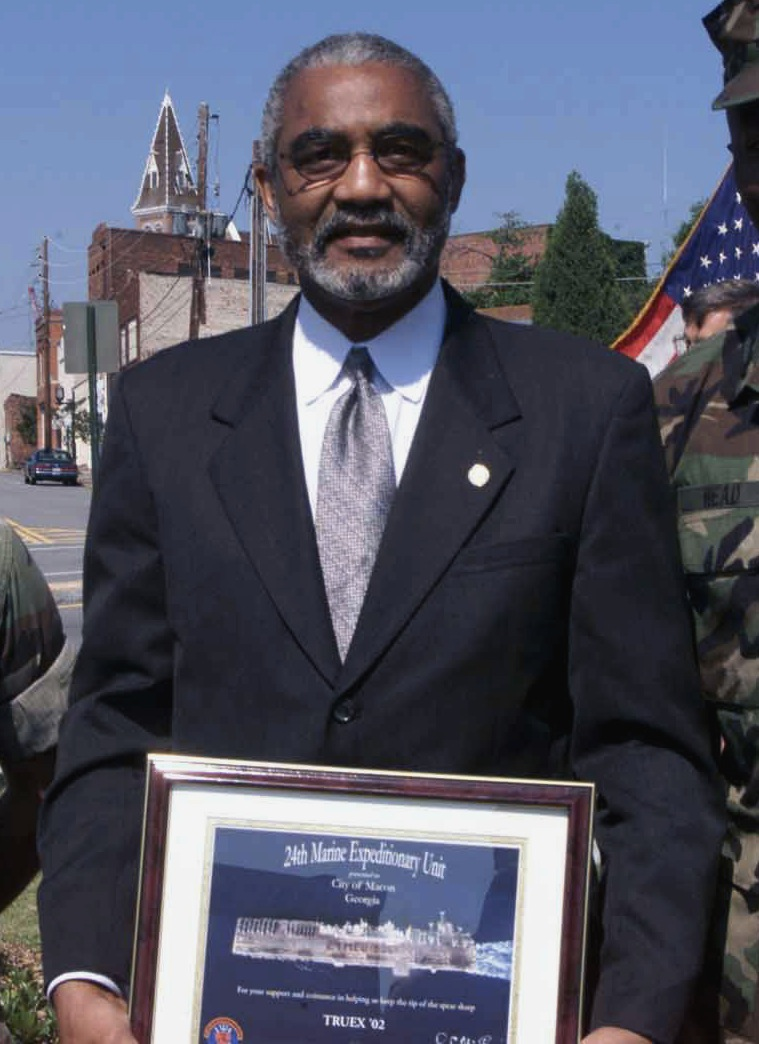
- Ellis in 2002

Mayor of Macon, Georgia
- In office December 14, 1999 – December 12, 2007
- Preceded by: Jim Marshall
- Succeeded by: Robert Reichert

Personal details
- Born: January 6, 1946 (age 80) Macon, Georgia
- Party: Democratic

C. Jack Ellis (born January 6, 1946) is a politician and the former mayor of Macon, Georgia.

== Early life and career ==
Prior to taking office, Ellis served 20 years in the United States Army as an airborne infantryman and airborne instructor; having served two tours in Vietnam with the 101st and 5th infantry divisions; earning the Bronze Star, Purple Heart, Army commendation medal for valor, Combat Infantryman Badge and Master Parachutist badge. Ellis also served in the 82nd Airborne Division, Fort Bragg. Ellis finished the last eleven of his over twenty year military career as a recruiter, serving to help transition the U.S. Army to an all-volunteer force. Upon retirement from the U.S. Army, Ellis served as an executive for the United States Census Bureau, and hosted a public access television show focusing on public and political affairs in the black community. Ellis also ran a youth summer basketball training camp in the U.S. Virgin Islands, hosting then-future NBA and professional basketball players.

== Mayor of Macon ==
=== 1999 and 2003 campaigns ===
Ellis ran for mayor of Macon in 1999. He defeated former Macon Mayor Buck Melton in the 1999 Democratic primary election, and was elected as the city's first African-American mayor in the mayoral general election.

After his first term, he was re-elected in 2003 after defeating several challengers in the Democratic primary and write-in opposition in the general election.

=== 2011 campaign ===
On April 16, 2011, Ellis officially began a third campaign for mayor of Macon against incumbent mayor Robert Reichert. In the July 19 Democratic primary, he placed second in the four-way race, with 37.6% of the vote. Because Reichert fell just shy of 50% of the vote, a run-off election was scheduled for August 16 between Ellis and Reichert. Ellis lost the election by 537 votes, receiving 9,770 of the 20,077 votes cast. Ellis did not rule out a future run for office.

== Controversies ==
In August 2007, C. Jack Ellis sent a letter of solidarity to Hugo Chávez, socialist President of Venezuela and vocal ally of Iran and Cuba. Public reaction in and around Macon was largely negative, with some residents calling for demonstrations and boycotts. Ellis maintained that the declaration was about Chávez's humanitarian efforts, not his political policies.

On April 2, 2008, Macon mayor Robert Reichert received a letter from U.S. Attorney Max Wood accusing the City of Macon, under the Ellis administration, of misusing federal funds and making false statements to government officials. The accusation was in regard to the $900,000 "Safe Schools Initiative grant" given to the city in 2002. The government could also demand that much of the grant money be returned, as well as impose a civil penalty, which the letter stated could be in excess of one million dollars. Ellis stated his confidence that the city had correctly spent the money, and that no wrongdoing had occurred. Despite efforts from his political rivals, no criminal charges were filed, and no evidence of wrongdoing was ever found or admitted by the state.

== Religious views ==
Ellis was born into a Baptist family in Macon, Georgia and is a member of Unionville Missionary Baptist Church.

Preceded by Jim Marshall	Mayor of Macon; 1999–2007	Succeeded by Robert Reichert
