= List of mayors of Macon, Georgia =

Mayor of Macon, Georgia
- Incumbent; Lester Miller since January 1, 2021
- Term length: 4 years
- Inaugural holder: David S. Booth (as intendent)
- Formation: 1824
- Website: Office of the Mayor

The Mayor of Macon-Bibb County is the highest elected official in the consolidated city-county government of Macon and Bibb County, Georgia, United States. The county was established in 1822, while the city was incorporated in 1823. Heads of the city were known as "intendents" prior to 1833. The city and county governments were consolidated in 2014.

== List of officeholders ==
=== Intendents of the City of Macon ===
- David S. Booth (1824)
- James H. Rogers (1825)
- Edward Dorr Tracy (1826)
- Washington Poe (1827)
- Robert Birdsong (1828)
- Joseph Washburn (1829)
- W. J. Dannelly (1830)
- Isaac R. Rowland (1831)
- Levi Eckley (1832)

=== Mayors of the City of Macon ===
- Isaac G. Seymour (1833–1834), elected by Board of Aldermen
- Robert Augustus Beall (1835), 1st popularly elected
- Isaac G. Seymour (1836–1839)
- Washington Poe (1840–1841)
- Frederick Sims (1842)
- John J. Gresham (1843)
- James A. Nisbet (1844–1845)
- Isaac Holmes (1846)
- John J. Gresham (1847)
- George M. Logan (1848–1850)
- James H. R. Washington (1851)
- E. L. Strohecker (1852–1854)
- Benjamin Franklin Ross (1855–1856)
- A. B. Adams (1857)
- Ovid G. Sparks (1858–1860), resigned September 18, 1860
- Methvin S. Thompson (1860–1862), elected September 25, 1860
- Ovid G. Sparks (1863)
- Stephen Collins (1864–1866)
- George S. Obear (1867–1870)
- William A. Huff (1871–1879)
- Felix Corput (1880–1883)
- Sylvester B. Price (1884–1894)
- Henry Horne (1895–1896)
- Sylvester B. Price (1897)
- Bridges Smith (1898–1907)
- Alexander Lawton Miller (1908–1909)
- John T. Moore (1910–1913)
- Bridges Smith (1914–1917)
- Glover Glendenning Toole (1918–1921)
- Luther Williams (1922–1925)
- Wallace Miller (1926–1927)
- Luther Williams (1928–1929)
- Glover Glendenning Toole (1930–1933)
- Herbert Ivan Smart (1933–1937)
- Charles L. Bowden (1937–1947)
- Lewis Burgess Wilson (1947–1953)
- Benjamin Franklin Merritt, Jr. (1953–1959)
- Edgar H. Wilson (1959–1963)
- Benjamin Franklin Merritt, Jr. (1963–1967)
- Ronnie Thompson (1967–1975), 1st elected Republican mayor
- Buck Melton (1975–1979)
- George Israel (1979–1987), 2nd elected Republican mayor
- Lee Robinson (1987–1991)
- Tommy Olmstead (1991–1995)
- David Carter (1995)
- Jim Marshall (1995–1999)
- C. Jack Ellis (1999–2007), first African-American mayor
- Robert Reichert (2007–2013)

=== Mayors of Macon-Bibb County ===
- Robert Reichert (2014–2020)
- Lester Miller (since 2021)

== See also ==
- Timeline of Macon, Georgia
