= Jim Marshall (Georgia politician) =

American politician (born 1948)

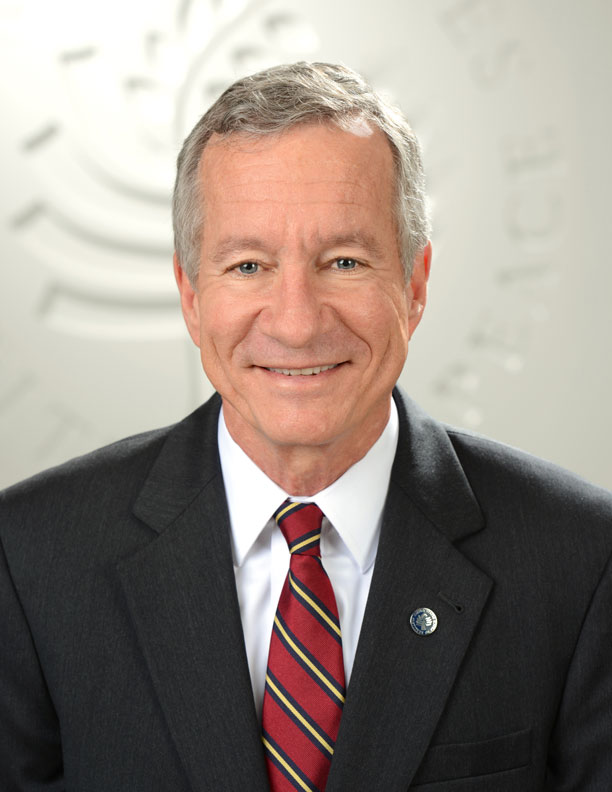

President of the United States Institute of Peace
- In office September 2012 – January 2014
- President: Barack Obama
- Preceded by: Richard H. Solomon
- Succeeded by: Kristin Lord (acting)

Member of the U.S. House of Representatives from Georgia
- In office January 3, 2003 – January 3, 2011
- Preceded by: Saxby Chambliss (redistricted)
- Succeeded by: Austin Scott
- Constituency: 3rd district (2003–2007); 8th district (2007–2011)

Mayor of Macon
- In office 1995 – December 14, 1999
- Preceded by: Tommy Olmstead
- Succeeded by: Jack Ellis

Personal details
- Born: James Creel Marshall; March 31, 1948 (age 78) Ithaca, New York, U.S.
- Party: Democratic
- Spouse: Camille Hope
- Children: 2
- Education: Princeton University (BA); Boston University (JD)

Military service
- Branch/service: United States Army
- Years of service: 1968–1970
- Unit: United States Army Rangers
- Battles/wars: Vietnam War
- Awards: Bronze Star (2); Purple Heart

James Creel Marshall (born March 31, 1948) is an American attorney who served as a member of the United States House of Representatives from 2003 to 2011. Marshall, a Democrat from Georgia, represented a district based in Macon that also included much of rural Central Georgia. His district was numbered the 3rd district from 2003 to 2007 and the 8th district from 2007 to 2011.

Marshall served as president of the United States Institute of Peace from September 2012 to January 2014. In 2013, British Advocacy organization Action on Armed Violence listed Marshall as one of the 100 more influential people in the world for armed violence reduction.

== Early life, education, and early career ==
The son and grandson of army generals, Marshall was born in Ithaca, New York, but moved frequently during his childhood and graduated from the McGill Institute (which later merged with Bishop Toolen to form McGill-Toolen Catholic High School) in Mobile, Alabama. He entered Princeton University in 1966, but left college in 1968 to enlist in the United States Army. He served in Vietnam as an Airborne Ranger reconnaissance platoon sergeant and earned two Bronze Stars (with "V" devices for valor) and a Purple Heart.

On June 29, 2006, Marshall was inducted into the U.S. Army Ranger Hall of Fame. He returned to Princeton in 1970 and graduated in 1972 with an A.B. in politics after completing a senior thesis titled "A Review of Tanzania and the Economics of Underdevelopment." Marshall worked various jobs for two years before entering law school at Boston University, where he earned his J.D. in 1977.

After clerking for two federal district court judges, Marshall was appointed a professor at Mercer University's Walter F. George School of Law in Macon, teaching in the areas of property, commercial, insurance, creditor's rights, insolvency, reorganization, and small business law. He was minority recruiter and advisor to the Black Law Student Association at Mercer. From 1987 to 1995, he not only taught at Mercer but also developed a commercial litigation and business insolvency consulting practice, and became involved in civic affairs. Among other things, he served as president of Leadership Macon and the Macon Bar Association. He was also chairman of the Macon Housing Authority. It was during this period that Marshall first became active in politics. He co-chaired the 1990 gubernatorial campaign of former U.S. Congressman and U.S. Ambassador to the U.N., and then as the current mayor of Atlanta, Andrew Young. Young was defeated in a primary run-off against Zell Miller. Marshall also chaired the successful state senate campaign of Robert Brown, the first African American since reconstruction to be elected to that body from outside the Atlanta metro area.

== Mayor of Macon ==
From 1995 to 1999, Marshall served as Mayor of Macon. During his tenure, the City of Macon increased its reserves, decreased its debt, lowered its property taxes and acquired a new public safety communications system. Marshall received national news attention for running down (on foot) a felon and encouraging Macon citizens to voluntarily house thousands of refugees from Hurricane Hugo. He was elected to the Advisory Board of the U.S. Conference of Mayors and co-chaired the National Democratic Mayors Conference.

== U.S. House of Representatives ==
=== Elections ===
2000

Marshall first ran for Congress in 2000 as the Democratic candidate for the 8th District. He was defeated by incumbent U.S. Representative Saxby Chambliss, 59% to 41%. Notably, during his years in Congress, Marshall formed a close working relationship with Chambliss.

2002

After the 2000 Census, the state legislature carved away much of the heavily Republican southern portion of the old 8th, including Chambliss' home in Moultrie. They replaced it with some more rural, Democratic-leaning territory around Macon and renumbered it the 3rd District. Marshall defeated Republican Bibb County Commissioner Calder Clay in a race that was expected to be very close. Marshall was hampered by voter anger over Warner Robins being cut out of the district. The reconfigured 3rd included all of Houston County except for a long gash where Warner Robins had been drawn into the 1st District. Marshall also had to contend with the presence of Sonny Perdue (a Houston County resident) atop the ballot as the Republican candidate for governor.

Marshall defeated Clay 51%–49%. Marshall thus became the only white Democrat in Georgia's House delegation, and the first since Nathan Deal switched parties in 1995.

2004

Marshall defeated Clay in their 2004 rematch, winning 63% of the vote, even as George W. Bush won the district with 56% of the vote.

2006

Early in 2005, the Georgia state legislature, now controlled by Republicans, approved a new map of congressional districts. The Macon-based district was significantly redrawn and renumbered once again as the 8th. The reconfigured 8th was considerably more Republican than its predecessor, even though it included 60% of Marshall's former territory as well as all of Macon.

The new district closely resembled the area Chambliss represented for eight years. Had the district existed in 2004, President Bush would have carried it with 61% of the vote.

Marshall's Republican opponent was former U.S. Congressman Mac Collins. Collins had represented a district in the southern Atlanta suburbs during his first stint in Congress, but moved back to his native Butts County after it was drawn into the reconfigured 8th. Collins benefited from two visits by President Bush, massive amounts of national party and PAC funding and Perdue's presence atop the ticket.

Marshall defeated Collins 51%–49%. It was the second-closest any Democratic incumbent came to losing his seat to a Republican in the 2006 elections. The closest election that year was Georgia Democratic U.S. Congressman John Barrow. As a result, the 8th became one of the most Republican districts in the nation to be represented by a Democrat.

2008

In 2008, Marshall faced Rick Goddard, who was a retired Air Force major general and the former commander of Warner Robins Air Logistics Center. This race was initially viewed as one of the few where a Republican had a realistic chance of defeating a Democrat. However, Marshall won with 57% of the vote, the same winning percentage that the district gave Republican Presidential nominee John McCain.

2010

In a landslide year for Republicans, Marshall was defeated 53%–47% by Republican State Representative Austin Scott, a resident of Chambliss' former base in the district's southern portion. Despite Marshall's moderate position, Scott successfully painted Marshall as a "Pelosicrat", accusing him of voting with Nancy Pelosi 80% of the time.

Since Marshall's defeat, the Democrats have only nominated a candidate in the 8th four times, neither of whom have cleared 40 percent of the vote.

=== Tenure ===
Rep. Marshall at a 14 November 2009 townhall meeting in Covington, Georgia.

Marshall was a member of the Blue Dog Coalition, a group of conservative congressional Democrats. The National Journal analyzed his voting record as right-of-center, leaning a bit toward the Republican side.

On social issues, Marshall generally voted in line with the conservative bent of his very rural Southern district. He voted to restrict access to legal abortions and supported a constitutional amendment defining marriage as a union between one man and one woman.

On economic issues, Marshall compiled a pro-business record. He was a prominent supporter of the TARP bailout legislation, declaring that he would give up his seat by voting for the bill, which he believed to be essential to avoid a second Great Depression. This issue became a centerpiece of both Marshall's successful 2008 re-election and his unsuccessful 2010 campaign. As a senior Democrat on the Agriculture subcommittee regulating futures and derivatives, Marshall was a moderating voice in the regulation of derivatives during the formulation of the Dodd-Frank financial reform legislation. Marshall was a consistent supporter of the Balanced Budget Amendment to the Constitution, and in 2010 he co-founded the Balanced Budget Amendment Caucus.

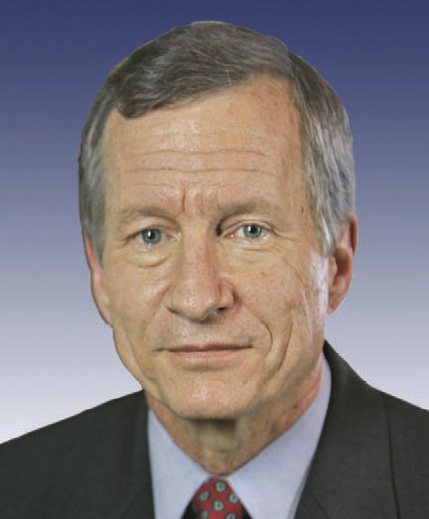
Marshall during the 109th Congress

Due to his military background, Marshall became a prominent voice on defense matters early in his first term when he won partial repeal of "the Disabled Veterans Tax" (also known as "concurrent receipt"). Marshall's one-man campaign brought disabled veterans their first victory on the issue in 19 years, leading the Retired Enlisted Association's TREA affiliate to name him legislator of the year for 2003.

In December 2005, Marshall was the sole Democrat to vote against HR 2863. This defense appropriations bill, which passed 308–122 with 107 Republicans in support, included language supporting increased protections for detainees held in U.S. custody.

In February 2007, he and Gene Taylor from Mississippi were the only Democrats to vote against H CON RES 63, which expressed opposition to a troop surge in the Iraq War. Marshall opposed the non-binding resolution H CON RES 63 because he believed that the only tangible affect it might have was a negative one on troop morale for those charged with executing the surge, as he explained in remarks to Congress.

Along with 38 other Democrats, Marshall voted against the Affordable Health Care for America Act, and explained his reasons to do so in an article in the National Review.

=== Committee assignments ===
- Committee on Agriculture
  - Subcommittee on General Farm Commodities and Risk Management
  - Subcommittee on Specialty Crops, Rural Development and Foreign Agriculture
- Committee on Armed Services
  - Subcommittee on Readiness
  - Subcommittee on Air and Land Forces
  - Subcommittee on Terrorism and Unconventional Threats
- Committee on Financial Services
  - Subcommittee on Capital Markets, Insurance and Government-Sponsored Enterprises
  - Subcommittee on Domestic and International Monetary Policy, Trade and Technology

=== Caucus memberships ===
- Chairman of the Board of Visitors of the United States Military Academy at West Point
- Founding Chair of the Financial Markets Caucus
- Founding Co-chair of the Balanced Budget Amendment Caucus
- Co-chair of the Air Force Caucus
- Steering Committee of the Rural Health Care Coalition
- Congressional Wildlife Refuge Caucus

== Post-Congressional career ==
Marshall took office as president of the United States Institute of Peace on September 14, 2012.

In June 2013, Marshall was named one of the 100 most influential people in the world for armed violence reduction by the British advocacy organization Action on Armed Violence.

In May 2013, Marshall was named by U.S. Rep. Adam Smith (D-WA) to the National Defense Panel, which assesses the Department of Defense's Quadrennial Defense Review.

Marshall was a visiting professor at Princeton University, where he taught in 2011. In February, 2011, he joined the Board of the National Futures Association.

== Personal life ==
Marshall lives in Macon with his wife Camille Hope, the daughter of National Hurricane Center meteorologist John Hope, and for whom Hurricane Camille was named. They have two children, Mary and Robert, both of whom attended his alma mater, Princeton University. His great-great-great-grandfather is former U.S. Congressman and famed inventor Hezekiah Bradley Smith. His grandfather Brigadier General James C. Marshall was the first District Engineer of the Manhattan Engineer District in World War II and as such was the initial commander of the atomic bomb project. His brother Mike Marshall was the long time editor of the Mobile Press-Register.

Political offices
Preceded by Tommy Olmstead	Mayor of Macon; 1995–1999	Succeeded by C. Jack Ellis
U.S. House of Representatives
Preceded by Mac Collins	Member of the U.S. House of Representatives from Georgia's 3rd congressional district 2003–2007	Succeeded by Lynn Westmoreland
Preceded by Lynn Westmoreland	Member of the U.S. House of Representatives from Georgia's 8th congressional district 2007–2011	Succeeded by Austin Scott
U.S. order of precedence (ceremonial)
Preceded by Bob Barr as Former U.S. Representative	Order of precedence of the United States as Former U.S. Representative	Succeeded by Paul Broun as Former U.S. Representative
