= Robert Reichert =

American politician

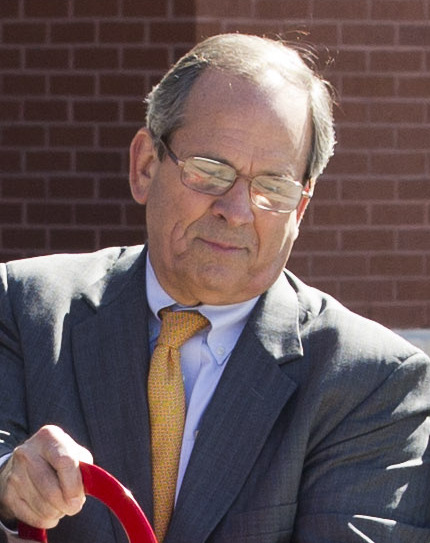

41st Mayor of Macon, Georgia
- In office December 12, 2007 – December 30, 2020
- Preceded by: C. Jack Ellis
- Succeeded by: Lester M. Miller

Member of the Georgia House of Representatives from the 126th district
- In office 1993–2003

Macon City Council member
- In office 1987–1992

Personal details
- Born: August 11, 1948 (age 77) Macon, Georgia, U.S.
- Party: Democratic
- Spouse: Dele Reichert
- Children: 2
- Parent(s): Albert Reichert, Sr.
- Education: Stratford Academy; University of Georgia (BS); Mercer University School of Law (JD)
- Profession: Attorney

Robert Reichert (born August 11, 1948) is an American Democratic politician and former mayor of Macon, Georgia, the fourth largest city in the state.

== Early life and education ==
Reichert was born in Macon to Albert Reichert, Sr. He graduated from Stratford Academy in Macon in 1966 and thereafter enrolled at the University of Georgia at Athens. He left the university in 1968 and entered the United States Army.

In 1976 he returned to the University of Georgia and received a Bachelor of Science degree in agriculture and biology. In 1981, he obtained his Juris Doctor degree from the Mercer University Walter F. George School of Law in Macon.

== Political career ==
In 1992, Reichert was elected to the Georgia House (District 126) from northwest Macon and Bibb County. He served a full decade but did not seek re-election in 2002. In the House, he served on the Industry Committee, the Judiciary Committee, and the Regulated Beverage Committee.

Reichert returned to politics when he ran in the Democratic primary for the Macon mayoralty. He won the nomination, and then won the November 6, 2007, mayoral election with 96 percent of the vote. The vote was 11,488 to 461 for the Republican candidate, David Cousino. In this heavily Democratic city, the general election is considered merely a pro forma contest.

In June 2013, Reichert was one of six mayoral candidates for the consolidated government of Macon-Bibb. On October 15, 2013, Reichert won a runoff election against C. Jack Ellis with 63.1% of the vote, becoming the first mayor of the consolidated city-county.

On March 19, 2015, Reichert announced that he would seek a second full term as mayor of Macon-Bibb. He went on to win the election uncontested, as his challenger, local pastor and attorney Lonzy Edwards, suspended his campaign due to health concerns on April 19, 2016, and died 10 days later.

In November 2020, Reichert vetoed an anti-discrimination ordinance for all Macon residents who are LGBTQIA+. The ordinance had received the majority of the vote from residents and a 5-4 vote by the Macon-Bibb Commission. In an official statement from the Mayor's office, Reichert stated that "after prayerful consideration" he would be vetoing the legislation. He also attributed his decision in part to the timing of the bill so late in the term. Opponents of the bill focused on how they felt the issue of enacting legislation to protect LGBTQ+ people went against their rights to their religious beliefs. “In fact, this ordinance takes away the business owners’ freedom to practice religion, and instead coerces many Christian and Jewish faith-based people in our county to accept the LGBTQ lifestyle as one of their moral beliefs,” said former mayoral candidate Blake Sullivan. Reichert stated the apprehension of the commissioners to amend the bill to address religious freedom concerns also attributed to his decision. Supporters of the bill, including many local attorneys urged him to sign it, claiming that Reichert had not referenced any specific legal concerns.

== See also ==
- Timeline of Macon, Georgia

Political offices
Preceded by C. Jack Ellis	Mayor of Macon, Georgia; 2007–present	Succeeded by Incumbent
