= Middle Georgia State University =

Public university in Macon, Georgia, US

- Former name: List: New Ebenezer College (1884–1898); Georgia State College of Agricultural and Mechanic Arts (1919–1927); Middle Georgia Agricultural and Mechanical Junior College (1927–1929); Middle Georgia College (1929–2013); Macon Junior College (1968–1987); Macon College (1987–1996); Macon State College (1996–2013); Middle Georgia State College (2013–2015)
- Motto: Curans, Complectens, Aptans, Sciens
- Motto in English: Stewardship, Engagement, Adaptability, Learning
- Type: Public university
- Established: 1884; 142 years ago
- Parent institution: University System of Georgia
- Endowment: $17 million (2019)
- Budget: $117 million (FY 2022)
- President: Christopher Blake
- Provost: David Jenks
- Administrative staff: 650
- Students: 8,828 (Fall 2025)
- Undergraduates: 8,130 (Fall 2025)
- Postgraduates: 698 (Fall 2025)
- Location: Macon, Georgia, United States; 32°48′26″N 83°43′56″W
- Campus: Campuses in Macon, Cochran, Dublin, Eastman, and Warner Robins
- Colors: Purple, Gray & Black
- Nickname: Knights
- Sporting affiliations: NCAA Division II – Peach Belt
- Mascot: Duke
- Website: mga.edu

Middle Georgia State University is a public university with its main campus in Macon, Georgia, United States. It is part of the University System of Georgia and offers programs to students on five campuses in Middle Georgia and online. Middle Georgia State University is accredited by the Southern Association of Colleges and Schools Commission on Colleges to award associate, baccalaureate, master's, and doctoral degrees.

The institution, originally known as Middle Georgia State College, was founded in 2013 through the merger of Middle Georgia College and Macon State College. Through these legacy institutions, Middle Georgia State University traces its history to 1884. In 2015, the institution adopted its current name to reflect its elevation to state university status.

== History ==
Middle Georgia State is a relatively new institution in name, though it has been in existence in several forms for most of 130 years.

=== 1884–1919 ===
The institution's beginnings date to the establishment of New Ebenezer College, which occupied the site of the current Cochran Campus. New Ebenezer was established in 1884 by the New Ebenezer Baptist Association, which was composed largely of Baptist churches in Pulaski, Dodge, Laurens, and Telfair counties of Middle Georgia. The first building on the campus was completed in 1886, and classes were first held in 1887 with approximately 100 students. However, the association discontinued its financial support for their namesake college in 1898, forcing the school to close its doors.

The college's building served as a high school for the city of Cochran until 1913, when the high school moved. No documentation exists regarding the facilities from 1913 to 1919, leading to the presumption that it was unoccupied during that time.

=== 1919–1931 ===
In 1919, the Georgia State College of Agricultural and Mechanic Arts (a division of the University of Georgia) opened a branch dedicated to serving the needs of the 12th Congressional District in the building formerly used by New Ebenezer College. In 1927, the school's name was changed to Middle Georgia Agricultural and Mechanical Junior College, though it remained a branch of the state agricultural school. In 1929, the school's name was changed to Middle Georgia College and responsibility for its operation was given to a nine-person board of trustees.

=== 1931–1965 ===
Middle Georgia College was made an independent institution in 1931 when it was created as one of the original units of the newly created University System of Georgia. During World War II, Middle Georgia hosted the 50th College Training Detachment of the U.S. Army Air Force and graduated 17 classes of aviation students from March 1943 – July 1944.

In 1964, Dr. Louis C. Alderman Jr. became president and served 23 years, the longest term of any president of the college. Many new buildings as well as renovations of existing facilities marked his tenure in growing the college's reputation, academic excellence, campus beauty, and athletic programs. Middle Georgia College continued to operate as a separate unit of the University System until the end of 2012.

=== 1965–1995 ===
In 1968, Macon Junior College was established on the western side of Macon, Georgia. The two year institution began its first year with 1,100 students which was the largest enrollment to this point for a new University System of Georgia institution.

Middle Georgia College opened a Dublin Campus in 1984. In 1987, the Regents removed "Junior" from the Macon college's name, but Macon College remained a two-year school, and in 1991 it began offering classes in a building at an office park in Warner Robins.

=== 1996–2011 ===
In 1996, Macon College was renamed Macon State College. The first bachelor's degrees were awarded in May 1999. With support from the City of Warner Robins and funding from the General Assembly, the college constructed a new building and renovated another to establish a new campus in Warner Robins in 2003.

Middle Georgia College also was expanding. A new program was added in 2007, when the college assumed the programs and facilities that had been the Georgia Aviation Technical College at Heart of Georgia Regional Airport in Eastman. With that consolidation, Middle Georgia College had campuses in Cochran, Dublin and Eastman.

While Middle Georgia College had residence halls, Macon State College, for its first 40 years, was strictly a commuter college. However, units in an apartment building near the campus opened as student housing for the fall 2010 semester.

In 2010, Macon State also became the host of the International Cherry Blossom Festival's annual Tunes and Balloons event.

=== 2011–present ===
From 2011 to 2015, the two institutions went through dramatic change, beginning in June 2011 when David Bell ended his 14-year presidency of Macon State. He was replaced in July 2011 by Jeff Allbritten. Six months later, in January 2012, the board of regents set in motion the consolidation of Macon State College with Middle Georgia College. In May, the regents decided on a name for the new institution, Middle Georgia State College, and also laid out a path for elevating the consolidated institution to university status after a review process. Allbritten left the presidency after only one year. In July 2012, he was succeeded by John Black, who had retired as president emeritus of East Georgia State College. Black became interim president of Macon State while Michael Stoy continued to serve as president of Middle Georgia College.

In the fall of 2012, students at the two colleges selected a new mascot to replace the "Blue Storm" (of Macon State) and the "Warriors" (of Middle Georgia). More than 1,000 students on the campuses of the two legacy institutions voted to select Knights as the new mascot. Students also selected new school colors of purple, black and silver, and they voted among several choices on the design of the new mascot. The new mascot and color selections were at least partially influenced by the two institutions' previous identities. The Blue Storm was depicted as a horse in clouds, while the Warriors were fighting humans. Some students saw the "knight," an armor-wearing fighting soldier often depicted as riding a horse, as a combination of the two former mascots. Selection of the new colors was similarly influenced by the past. The Blue Storm colors were blue and gold; the Warrior colors were red and black. The combination of blue and red form purple, a regal color often worn by knights. Students also proposed many names for the new mascot; the name "Duke" was selected in another student vote.

The Southern Association of Colleges and Schools Commission on Colleges (SACSCOC), the institutional accreditor of both colleges, approved the consolidation of the two colleges in December 2012. The board of regents voted to make the consolidation official, effective immediately, on January 8, 2013. Black was re-appointed as interim president of the new institution, Middle Georgia State College. His term ended in December 2013, and Christopher Blake assumed the presidency on January 2, 2014. In March 2015, the board of regents approved the elevation of Middle Georgia State to state university status, which took place on July 1, 2015, thus becoming Middle Georgia State University. The university held its first homecoming activities in September 2015.

In October, the university announced the expansion of its flight programs previously only offered at the Eastman Campus. The institution is leasing facilities from the Macon-Bibb County Industrial Authority to offer flight courses at the Macon Downtown Airport in east Bibb County. Two months later, SACSCOC accredited the university to offer master's degrees, starting in January 2016, and to admit and register students for its new online graduate programs, the Master of Science in Information Technology and the Master of Science in nursing. Subsequently, the university also introduced the Master of Arts in Teaching (Secondary Education), Master of Arts in Technical and Professional Writing, and Master of Science in Management. The university began offering its first doctorate in 2021, a Doctor of Science in Information Technology. A second Doctorate of Science, in Public Safety and Emergency Management, was added two years later.

== Academic programs and organization ==
The university's academic programs are currently offered by 17 departments in one college and six schools:

- College of Nursing and Allied Health
- School of Arts and Letters
- School of Aviation
- School of Business
- School of Computing
- School of Education and Behavioral Sciences
- The Graduate School

The university offers doctoral, master's, bachelor's, and associate degrees, along with a limited number of certificates.

Several of the university's academic programs have earned accreditation from national agencies:

- The School of Education has been accredited by the National Council for Accreditation of Teacher Education (NCATE) and the Georgia Professional Standards Commission (GaPSC)
- The bachelor's in information technology has been accredited by the Computing Accreditation Commission of ABET
- The master's, bachelor's and associate's in nursing has been accredited by the Accreditation Commission for Education in Nursing (ACEN)
- The associate's in occupational therapy assistant has been accredited by the Accreditation Council for Occupational Therapy Education (ACOTE) of the American Occupational Therapy Association (AOTA)
- The associate's in respiratory therapy has been accredited by the Commission on Accreditation for Respiratory Care (CoARC)

The university also operates the Georgia Academy (formerly known as GAMES), a two-year non-residential/commuter Dual Enrollment program that prepares high school students for the academic rigor of higher education - specializing in a STEM discipline. This program was previously a residential, two-year program based on the Cochran campus.

== Study abroad ==
Students at Middle Georgia State have the opportunity to study abroad through the University System's European Council, which seeks to foster greater understanding and appreciation of the cultures and societies of Europe. The EC sponsors summer study abroad programs for USG students and transients at seven locations in Europe that last 2–5 weeks. Courses are taught largely by faculty from USG colleges and universities and students, blending classroom experiences with group and individual travel as they earn academic credit at their home institution.

== Honors Program ==
The Honors Program at Middle Georgia State is designed to help academically advanced undergraduate students develop their potential through challenging educational activities. Its main goal is to encourage these students in individual, rational, and creative thinking and better prepare them for graduate school. Honors students have small classes with the university's finest professors, and students have opportunities to travel with their professors to research libraries, museums and theaters, and formal academic conferences.

== Athletics ==
Middle Georgia State Knights
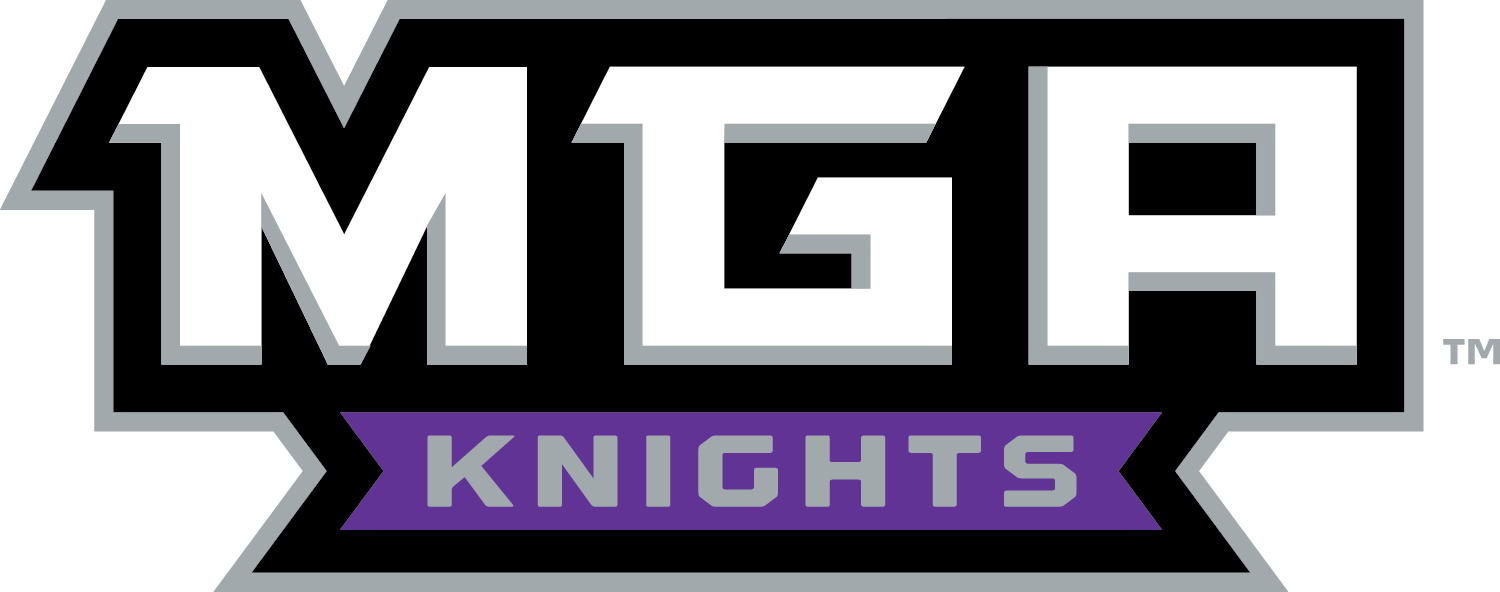
- University: Middle Georgia State University
- Nickname: Knights
- Association: NCAA
- Conference: Peach Belt (primary)
- Athletic director: Michael Brown
- Location: Cochran, Georgia
- Varsity teams: 10 (4 men's, 6 women's)
- Basketball arena: Morris Gymnasium
- Baseball stadium: Stuckey Field
- Softball stadium: Knights Field
- Soccer field: Nesmith Field
- Tennis venue: MGA Tennis Courts
- Colors: Purple, black, and silver
- Mascot: Duke
- Website: mgaknights.com
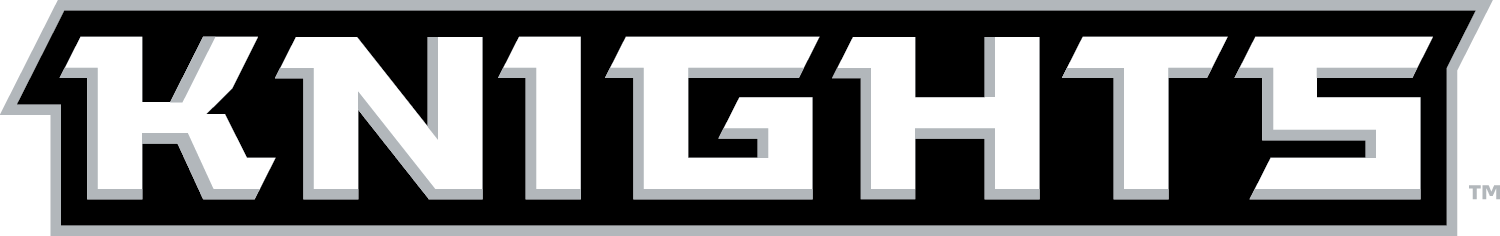

The Middle Georgia State athletic teams are called the Knights. The university is a member of the NCAA, primarily competing in the Peach Belt Conference (provisional status of the NCAA starting fall 2025) since the 2025–26 academic year. The Knights previously competed in the Southern States Athletic Conference (SSAC) of the NAIA since fall 2014, and the Georgia Collegiate Athletic Association (GCAA) of the National Junior College Athletic Association (NJCAA) during the 2013–14 academic year (the only season after becoming the Knights, before competing in such leagues as the Middle Georgia College Warriors).

=== Nickname and mascot ===
In the fall of 2012, students at the two colleges selected a new mascot to replace the Blue Storm (of Macon State) and the Warriors (of Middle Georgia). More than 1,000 students on the campuses of the two legacy institutions voted to select Knights as the new mascot. Students also selected new school colors of purple, black and silver, and they voted among several choices on the design of the new mascot. The new mascot and color selections were at least partially influenced by the two institutions' previous identities. The Blue Storm was depicted as a horse in clouds, while the Warriors were fighting humans. Some students saw the "knight," an armor-wearing fighting soldier often depicted as riding a horse, as a combination of the two former mascots. Selection of the new colors was similarly influenced by the past. The Blue Storm colors were blue and gold; the Warrior colors were red and black. The combination of blue and red form purple, a regal color often worn by knights. Students also proposed many names for the new mascot; the name "Duke" was selected in another student vote.

=== Sports sponsored ===
Middle Georgia State competes in ten intercollegiate varsity sports: Men's sports include baseball, (Note: Facilities of that sport are hosted in the Cochran campus) basketball, soccer and tennis; (Note: Facilities of that sport are hosted in the Macon campus) while women's sports include basketball, cross country, soccer, softball, tennis & volleyball.

The university also houses a club equestrian team (IHSA) in Cochran that is open to students from any MGA campus.

==== Baseball ====
The Middle Georgia baseball program is one of the winningest programs in the United States, with an overall record of 2140-714 since 1967. The program's overall winningest percentage of .749 is among the highest of any program in the United States.

There have been 136 players from Middle Georgia drafted in the MLB Draft, which ranks third among all colleges & universities in Georgia—only Georgia & Georgia Tech have had more. There have been 7 first round draft picks & 44 total top-five-round draft picks out of Middle Georgia, with 20 players from Middle Georgia reaching the major leagues.

== Campuses ==
Student demographics as of Fall 2025
Race and ethnicity	Total
White	48%
Black	31%
Hispanic	9%
Two or more races	5%
Asian	5%
Economic diversity
Low-income (Note: The percentage of students who received an income-based federal Pell grant intended for low-income students.)	46%
Affluent (Note: The percentage of students who are a part of the American middle class at the bare minimum.)	54%

For the Fall 2025 semester, Middle Georgia State University reached its highest enrollment in school history, with a total of 8,828 students enrolled for the semester.

The university has five campuses and one off-campus instructional site in the following locations:

=== Macon ===
The 400-acre (1.6 km^{2}) Macon Campus is the university's main campus, located in the western section of Bibb County at the junction of Interstate 475 and U.S. Route 80 (Eisenhower Parkway). It was the original main campus of Macon State College. The campus has more than a dozen major buildings and a scenic lake. A new recreation and wellness facility, which includes state-of-the-art fitness equipment and a lazy river, opened in the spring of 2014. The campus currently has two student dormitories, University Pointe and Lakeview Pointe, each with more than 300 beds.

The Macon Campus is the home of the university's men's and women's tennis teams, and the women's cross country and volleyball teams.

The Macon Campus is also home to the university's music program.

The Macon Campus is home of the university's Museum of Technology, which showcases hands-on exhibits and hosts community learning events.

=== Cochran ===
This historic campus of 182 acres (0.74 km^{2}) dates back to 1884 and is shaded, scenic, and traditional, with a lake and stately white-columned classroom buildings. This was the original main campus of Middle Georgia College. The Cochran Campus has a wellness and recreation center, an outdoor pool, a beach volleyball court, tennis and pickleball courts, dining facilities, an on-campus health center, and different styles of student dormitories with more than 1,100 beds.

The Cochran Campus is home to many of the university's intercollegiate athletic facilities:

- Stuckey Field (baseball)
- Morris Gymnasium (basketball)
- NeSmith Field (soccer)
- Knight Field (softball)
- The newest club sport at MGA, club equestrian, holds their practices at the Middle Georgia Equestrian Center in Cochran. Students from all five campuses are encouraged to participate. This club was acknowledged by House Representative Bubber Epps who presented the club with a state proclamation.

=== Dublin ===
The 49-acre (0.20 km^{2}) Dublin Campus is the healthcare degree program hub. The campus includes a library, classrooms, computer labs, and an annex. In 2023, a planned campus expansion was announced, which included two large nursing lecture classrooms, a 20-bed hospital laboratory, a 3-bed nursing simulation lab, and a technologically enhanced observation room that would connect to the simulation room.

=== Eastman ===
The 22-acre (89,000 m^{2}) Eastman Campus is home to the university's School of Aviation. It is the only campus in the University System of Georgia that includes flight training and airport management programs, and is adjacent to the Heart of Georgia Regional Airport. In a future expansion, the School of Aviation plans to begin offering new programs in Aviation Science and Management with tracks in Aerospace Logistics and Aviation Maintenance Management. There is one, 140-bed student housing facility on the Eastman Campus: Aviation Hall.

=== Warner Robins ===
The 72-acre (0.29 km^{2}) Warner Robins Campus is located one-half mile west of the main gate of Robins Air Force Base. Three academic buildings are now in place: Thomas Hall, the Academic Services Building, and Oak Hall. The campus facilities include a bookstore, recreation/fitness center, and cafe. The campus is situated adjacent to the Nola Brantley Memorial Library. The Warner Robins campus is now home to the Georgia Academy (starting in 2023).

=== Instructional site ===
In addition to programs on its five campuses and online, Middle Georgia State University offers a Certificate in Film Production, with classes taught at Trilith Studios Stages (formerly Pinewood Atlanta Studios) in Fayette County, Georgia.

== Greek life ==
The university started hosting Greek organizations in the fall 2015 semester, including fraternities and sororities.

== Alma mater ==
With the creation of a new university, former director of bands, Alan Clark, commissioned the creation of a new alma mater. He turned to renowned composer Robert W. Smith of Troy, Alabama, to write the music and lyrics, with input on the words from the university's top administrators. The song is titled "Knights of Truth and Honor". The music was played for the first time by the Band of Knights and sung for the first time by the MGA Chamber Singers at the inauguration of President Christopher Blake on October 17, 2014.

== Notable alumni ==
- Andrico Hines, professional football player
- Josh Reddick, professional baseball player
- George Thornewell Smith, politician
- Jerry Zulli, college baseball coach
- Terry Evans, professional baseball player
- Emory Gordy Jr., musician and music producer
- Kal Daniels, professional baseball player
- Andy Abad (Tulile), professional baseball player
- Ernest Riles, professional football player
- Tonya Butler, college football player
- Tom Dunbar, professional baseball player
- Barret Browning, professional baseball player
- Kevin Young, professional and college basketball coach
- Jeff Treadway, professional baseball player
- Jody Davis, professional baseball player
- Jim Leyritz, professional baseball player
- J. B. Wendelken, professional baseball player
- Matt Turner, professional baseball player
- Ray Stephens, professional baseball player
- Warren Newson, professional baseball player
- Larry Littleton, professional baseball player
- Garey Ingram, professional baseball player
- Shawn Hillegas, professional baseball player
- Willie Harris, professional baseball player
- Mike Fitzgerald, professional baseball player
- David Perno, college baseball coach
- Manny Mantrana, college baseball coach
- Scott Forbes, college baseball coach
- Tony Cruz, professional baseball player
- Will Pettis, professional football player
- Antonio Cochran, professional football player
- Danny Mathis, politician
- Josh Brunty, US Cyber Team coach
- James Arthur Williams, historic preservationist

== See also ==
- Waddell Barnes Botanical Gardens
