= Bleckley =

Bleckley may refer to:

People:

- Erwin R. Bleckley (1894–1918), United States Army Air Service aviator during World War I, and posthumous recipient of the Medal of Honor
- Haralson Bleckley (1870–1933), American architect
- Logan Edwin Bleckley (1827–1907), American lawyer and jurist

Locations:

- Bleckley County, Georgia, county located in the U.S. state of Georgia
- Bleckley County High School, high school in Cochran, Georgia, USA, 120 miles south of Atlanta
- Bleckley County School District, public school district in Bleckley County, Georgia, USA, based in Cochran, Georgia

== See also ==
- Blackley
- Bletchley
