= Zulli =

Zulli is an Italian surname. Notable people with the surname include:

- Jerry Zulli (born 1978), American baseball coach
- Michael Zulli (1952–2024), American artist
- Zach Zulli (born 1991), American football player

== See also ==
- Tulli
