= National Register of Historic Places listings in Bleckley County, Georgia =

This is a list of properties and districts in Bleckley County, Georgia that are listed on the National Register of Historic Places (NRHP).

This National Park Service list is complete through NPS recent listings posted March 21, 2025.

== Current listings ==
	Name on the Register	Image	Date listed	Location	City or town	Description
1	Bleckley County Courthouse	Bleckley County Courthouse	September 18, 1980 (#80000975)	Courthouse Sq. 32°23′15″N 83°21′20″W	Cochran	
2	Cochran Municipal Building and School	Cochran Municipal Building and School	July 31, 2003 (#03000704)	Jct. of Dykes St. and Second St. 32°23′13″N 83°21′17″W	Cochran	The two buildings nearest the corner of 2nd and Dykes
3	Hillcrest	Hillcrest	April 21, 1983 (#83000184)	706 Beech St. 32°23′39″N 83°21′04″W	Cochran	
