= Heart of Georgia Regional Airport =

Airport in Eastman, Georgia, United States

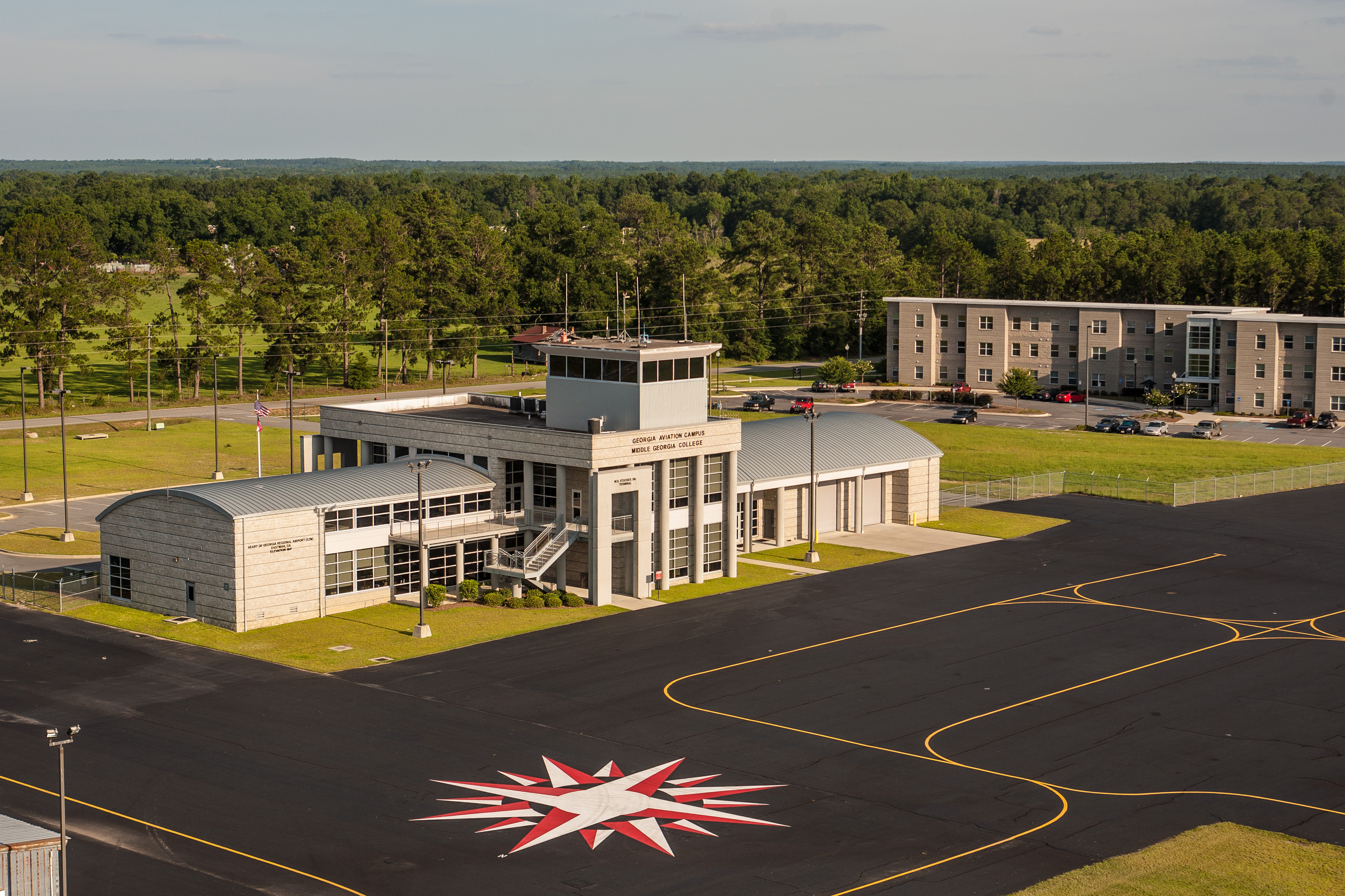
- IATA: none; ICAO: KEZM; FAA LID: EZM

Summary
- Airport type: Public
- Owner: Heart of Georgia Airport Authority
- Serves: Eastman, Georgia
- Elevation AMSL: 303.4 ft (92.5 m)
- Coordinates: 32°12′59″N 83°7′43″W
- Interactive map of Heart of Georgia Regional Airport

Runways
Direction	Length		Surface
Direction	ft	m	Surface
2/20	6,506	1,983	Asphalt

Heart of Georgia Regional Airport (ICAO: KEZM, FAA LID: EZM) (formerly named Eastman–Dodge County Airport) is a public airport located in Eastman, Georgia, United States. It is situated three miles (5 km) east of the city center of Eastman. The airport is home to Middle Georgia State University's aviation management programs, which include air traffic control, flight training and mechanic programs.

== History ==
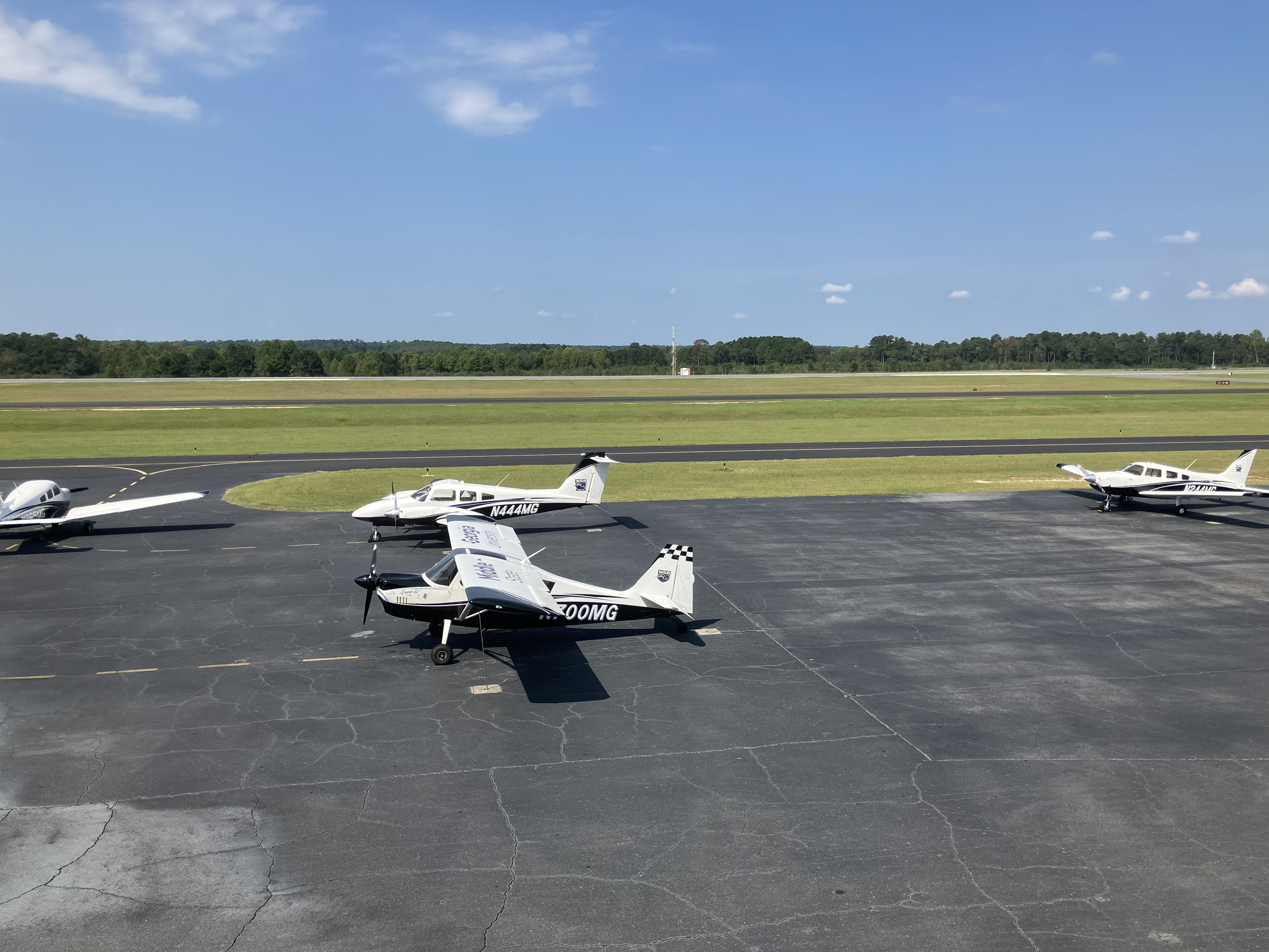
Various aircraft owned by Middle Georgia State University at Heart of Georgia Regional Airport

Eastman–Dodge County Airport was built in 1966 to accommodate the expanding business needs of the local convenience store chain, Stuckey's. Eastman–Dodge County Airport was renamed to Heart of Georgia Regional Airport on October 9, 1995 by the Eastman-Dodge County Airport Authority.

The construction of a 50,000 square feet (4,600 m^{2}) aviation campus for Heart of Georgia Technical Institute was completed in December 1995 on 14 acres (5.7 ha) of land adjacent to the airport. Classes commenced at the campus in April 1996. The campus, which became Georgia Aviation Technical College in July 2001, was further expanded in March 2000 and November 2004. Middle Georgia College absorbed Georgia Aviation Technical College in 2007 and was later brought under the control of Middle Georgia State University in January 2013.

== Facilities ==
Heart of Georgia Regional Airport has one runway, Runway 2/20 which is 6,506 by 100 feet (1,983 m × 30 m) long. The runway surface is asphalt. The airport has an air traffic control tower, it operates during school hours: Monday through Thursday 8:00am to 6:00pm, and Friday 8:00 am to 12:00 pm.

== See also ==
- List of airports in Georgia (U.S. state)
