= Robert Pruitt =

Robert Pruitt may refer to:

- Robert Pruitt (artist) (born 1975), visual artist
- Robert Pruitt (politician) (born 1975), American politician from Georgia
