= Cochran Municipal Building and School =

Historic building in the US state of Georgia

- U.S. National Register of Historic Places
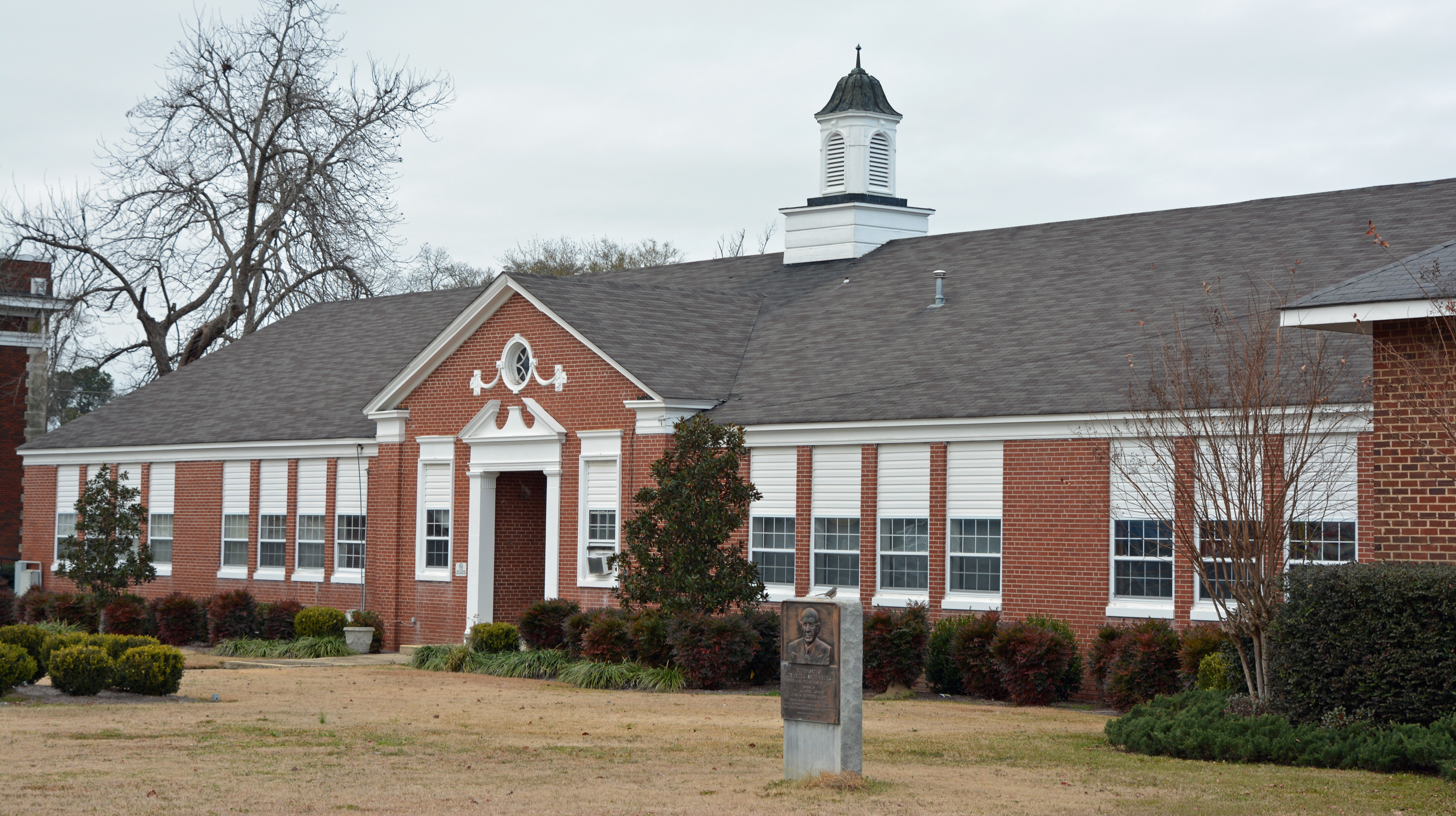
- Cochran Municipal Building

- Location within Georgia Location within the United States
- Location: Jct. of Dykes St. and Second St., Cochran, Georgia
- Coordinates: 32°23′14″N 83°21′17″W
- Area: 2.5 acres (1.0 ha)
- Built: 1928; 1940-42
- Built by: Mullis, John H. Mullis and J.P. Arnold (1928 building); Works Project Administration (1940-42)
- Architect: Dennis & Dennis (1940 building)
- Architectural style: Colonial Revival (1928 building)
- NRHP reference No.: 03000704
- Added to NRHP: July 31, 2003

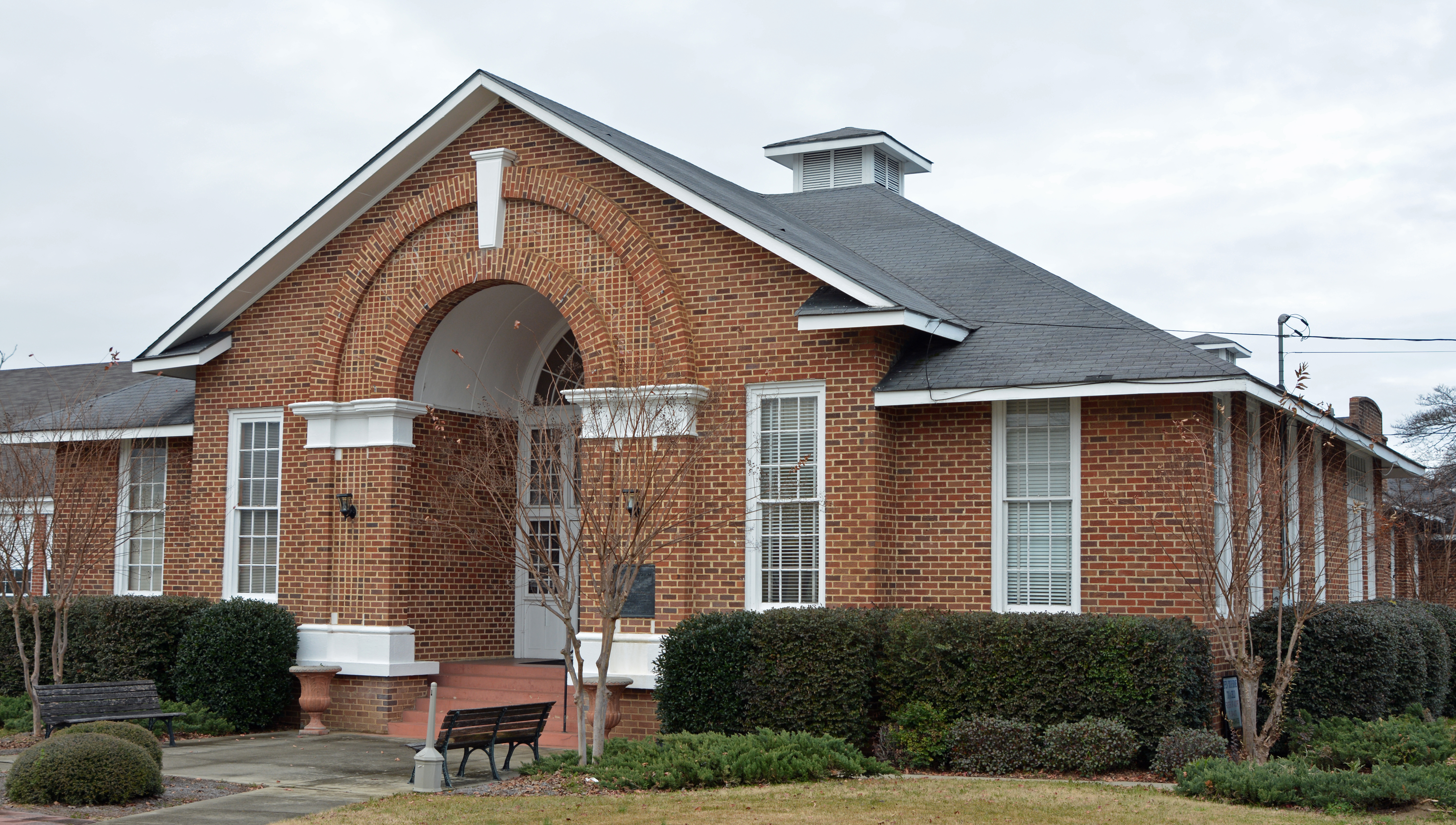
Cochran School

The Cochran Municipal Building and School are two historic buildings in Cochran, Georgia. They are located at the intersection of Dykes Street (Georgia State Route 112/26) and Second Street (U.S. Route 23 Business), on the same block as the Bleckley County Courthouse. The school was built in 1928 and the Municipal Building was built in 1942. The Municipal Building was designed by Dennis and Dennis of Macon, Georgia, and was constructed by the Works Progress Administration.

The two buildings were added to the National Register of Historic Places on July 31, 2003.

== See also ==
- National Register of Historic Places listings in Bleckley County, Georgia
