= Nancye Radmin =

American businesswoman (1938–2020)

- Born: Nancye Jo Bullard; August 4, 1938; Nashville, Tennessee, United States
- Died: December 8, 2020 (aged 82); Lakeland, Florida, United States
- Occupation: Businesswoman

Nancye Radmin (August 4, 1938 – December 8, 2020), born Nancye Jo Bullard, was an American businesswoman, owner of The Forgotten Woman, a national chain of shops for plus-size clothing.

== Early life ==
Nancye Jo Bullard was born in Nashville, Tennessee, and raised in Cochran, Georgia, the daughter of Joe Dykes Bullard Jr. and Jane Johnson Bullard. Her parents had a peanut, pecan, and cotton farm; her mother was a registered nurse. Bullard attended but did not graduate from Middle Georgia College.

== Career ==
Bullard moved to New York City in the 1960s, and was a secretary before she married. In 1977, Radmin opened The Forgotten Woman boutique on the Upper East Side, to sell high-end designer clothing in larger women's sizes, including lingerie, accessories, jewelry, and shoes. "They had all these myths that fat ladies don't buy expensive clothes", Radmin said in a 1988 interview. "Well, they do. And a lot of 'em". The chain extended to 25 shops across the United States by 1991, including locations in suburban Detroit, West Palm Beach and on Rodeo Drive. Her business counted celebrities including Oprah Winfrey among its clientele. In 1990, Savvy magazine ranked The Forgotten Woman among the top 60 American businesses owned and run by women.

In 1991 Radmin stepped down as president of the company, and in 1993, she left the company. The chain folded in 1998. Radmin also worked with Vogue Patterns on a line of plus-sized patterns.

== Personal life ==
Nancye Jo Bullard, raised a Southern Baptist, converted to Judaism when she married widower Mack Radmin, a meat wholesaler, in 1968. She had two sons, Brett and William. She was widowed when Mack Radmin died in 2006; she died in 2020, aged 82, in Lakeland, Florida.
