= Danny Mathis =

American politician

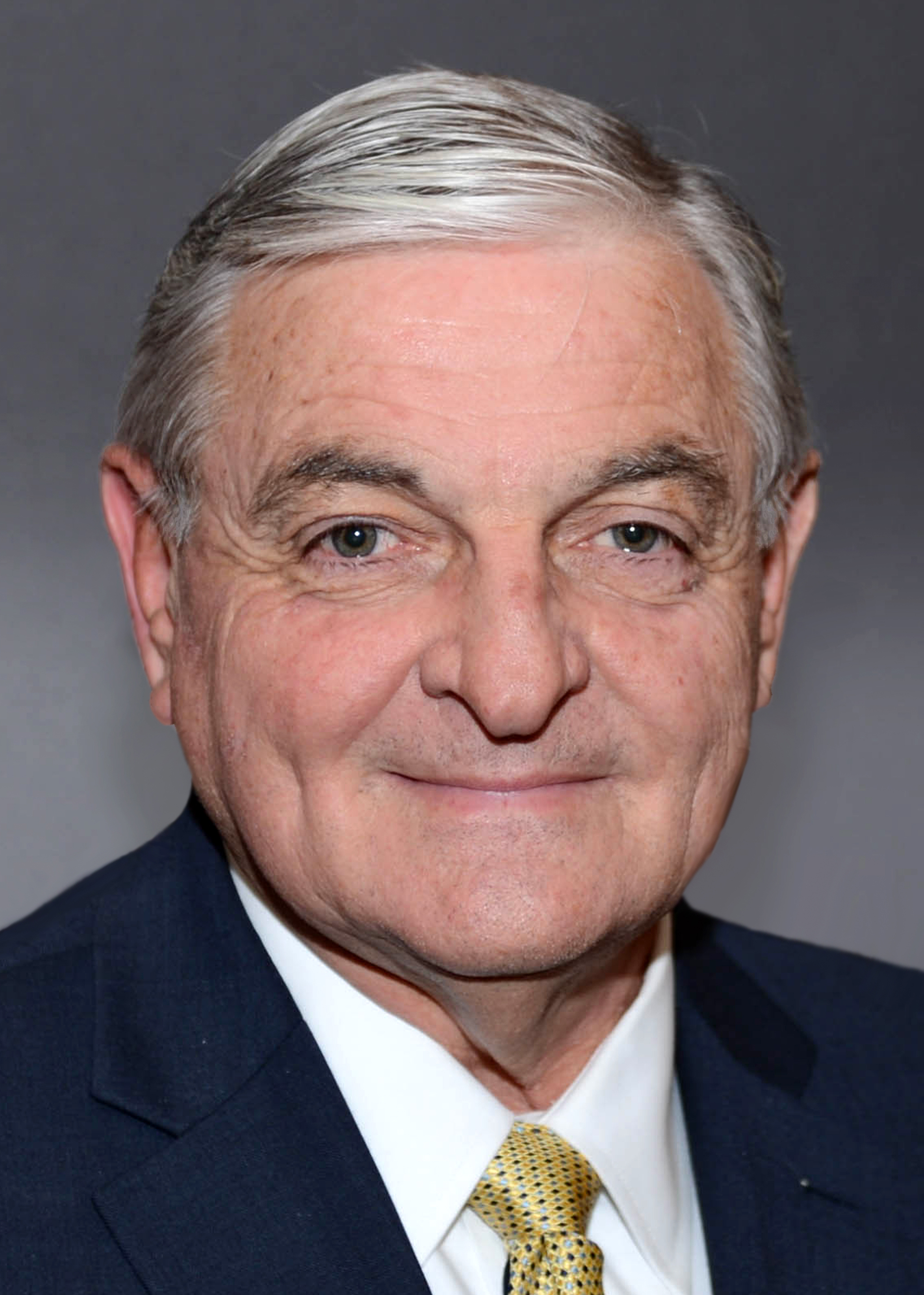
- Official headshot

Member of the Georgia House of Representatives
- Incumbent
- Assumed office January 14, 2019
- Preceded by: Bubber Epps
- Constituency: 144th District (2019–2023); 149th District(2023–2025); 133rd District (2025–Present)

Personal details
- Born: Dana Greene Mathis; October 3, 1954 (age 71)
- Party: Republican
- Spouse: Ellen Mathis
- Children: 3
- Occupation: Politician, coroner

Dana Greene Mathis (born October 3, 1954) is an American politician and coroner from Georgia. Mathis is a Republican member of the Georgia House of Representatives for District 133.

== Education ==
Mathis attended Middle Georgia College and Gupton-Jones College of Funeral Service.

== Career ==
Mathis is a medical examiner, coroner and also owner of a funeral home.

On November 6, 2018, Mathis won the election and became a Republican member of Georgia House of Representatives for District 144. Mathis defeated Jessica Walden with 65.38% of the votes. On November 3, 2020, as an incumbent, Mathis won the election and continued serving District 144. Mathis defeated Mary Ann Whipple-Lue with 69.08% of the votes.

== Personal life ==
Mathis' wife is Ellen Mathis. They have three children. Mathis and his family live in Cochran, Georgia.

Georgia House of Representatives
Preceded by Bubber Epps	Member of the Georgia House of Representatives from the 144th district 2019–2023	Succeeded by Dale Washburn
Preceded by Robert Pruitt	Member of the Georgia House of Representatives from the 149th district 2023–2025	Incumbent
