= Dale Washburn =

American politician

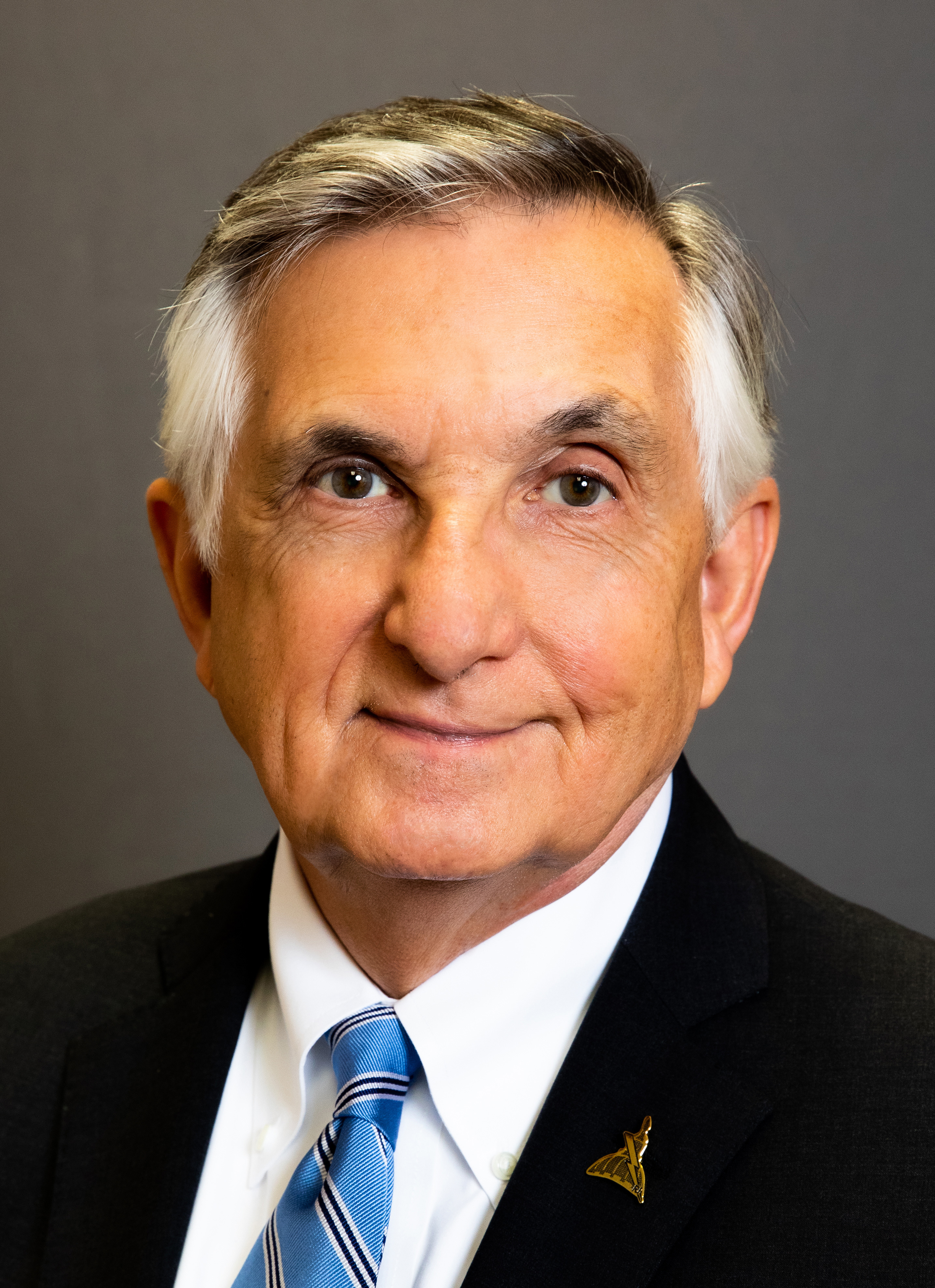
- Official headshot

Member of the Georgia House of Representatives
- Incumbent
- Assumed office January 14, 2019
- Preceded by: Allen Peake
- Constituency: 141st District (2019–2023); 144th District (2023–Present)

Personal details
- Born: Roy Dale Washburn; December 13, 1950 (age 75)
- Party: Republican
- Spouse: Donna
- Children: 4

Roy Dale Washburn (born December 13, 1950) is an American politician from Georgia.

== Career ==
Washburn is a Republican member of Georgia House of Representatives. In 2018, he was elected in District 141.

== Personal life ==
Washburn's wife is Donna Washburn. They have four children.

Georgia House of Representatives
Preceded by Allen Peake	Member of the Georgia House of Representatives from the 141st district 2019–2023	Succeeded by Carolyn Hugley
Preceded by Danny Mathis	Member of the Georgia House of Representatives from the 144th district 2023–Present	Incumbent
