= Jimmy Pruett =

American politician

Member of the Georgia House of Representatives from the 149th district
- In office January 14, 2013 – January 11, 2021
- Preceded by: Gerald Greene
- Succeeded by: Robert Pruitt

Member of the Georgia House of Representatives from the 144th district
- In office January 8, 2007 – January 14, 2013
- Preceded by: Terry Coleman
- Succeeded by: Bubber Epps

Personal details
- Born: March 24, 1952 (age 74) United States
- Party: Republican

Jimmy Pruett (born March 24, 1952) is an American politician. He is a former Republican member of the Georgia House of Representatives from the 149th District, serving from 2007 to 2021.
