= Bubber Epps =

American politician

Member of the Georgia House of Representatives from the 144th district
- In office 2008 – January 14, 2019
- Preceded by: Jimmy Pruett
- Succeeded by: Danny Mathis

Personal details
- Born: September 7, 1943 (age 82) Macon, Georgia, U.S.
- Party: Democratic (?–2010); Republican (2010–present)

James A. "Bubber" Epps (born September 7, 1943) is an American politician. Epps is a retired paving contractor, living in Dry Branch. He previously served as a member of the Georgia House of Representatives from the 144th District, serving from 2008 until Jan. 14, 2019. He is a member of the Republican party.

== Biography ==
He was born in Bibb County and graduated from Twiggs County High School. He studied at Brewton Parker College and Mercer University, gaining a Bachelor of Science in Political Science and a master's degree in Education. He spent the early years of his adult life in education working at the University of Georgia and then joined his family's paving business, Epps Brothers Construction Company, Inc. where he retired in 2007.

He is married to Kathryn. They have three children, eight grandchildren and two great grandchildren. Epps is a lifelong member and a Deacon of Antioch Baptist Church in Dry Branch.

== Political career ==
Epps represented the 144th district, covering Bleckley, Twiggs and Wilkinson Counties as well as parts of Bibb, Houston, Jones and Laurens Counties, from 2009 to 2019.

He was chairman of the House Motor Vehicles Committee and secretary of the House Transportation Committee.
