= Cochran, Georgia =

City in Georgia, United States

- City
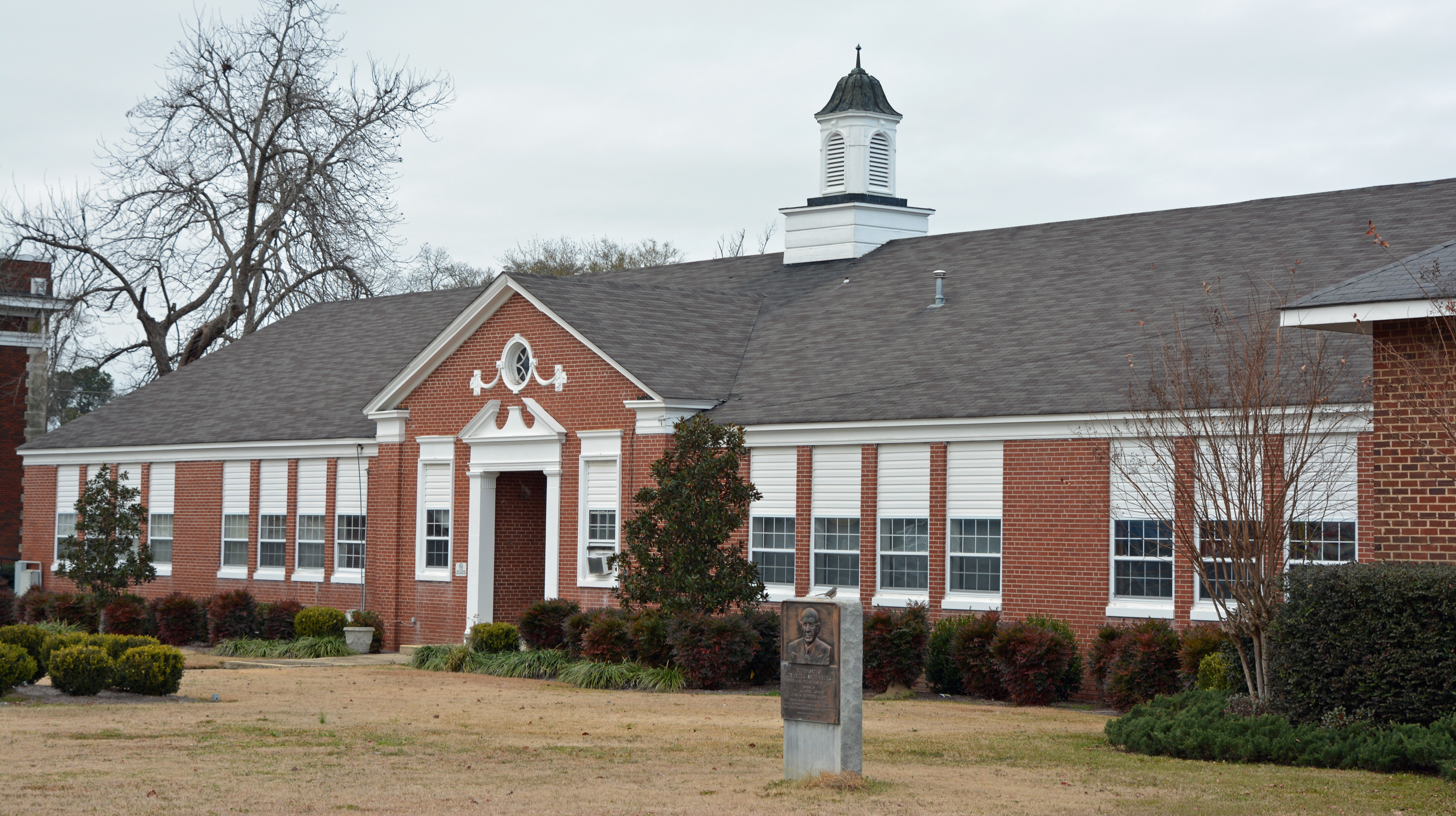
- Cochran Municipal Building

- Flag Seal Logo
- Nickname: Castle City
- Motto: Your Southern Home
- Location in Bleckley County and the state of Georgia
- Coordinates: 32°23′12″N 83°21′2″W
- Country: United States
- State: Georgia
- County: Bleckley

Government
  - Mayor: Billy Yeomans
  - City Manager: Richard Newbern

Area
  - Total: 4.86 sq mi (12.58 km^{2})
  - Land: 4.69 sq mi (12.14 km^{2})
  - Water: 0.17 sq mi (0.44 km^{2})
- Elevation: 341 ft (104 m)

Population (2020)
  - Total: 5,026
  - Density: 1,072.7/sq mi (414.16/km^{2})
- Time zone: UTC-5 (EST)
  - Summer (DST): UTC-4 (EDT)
- ZIP code: 31014
- Area code: 478
- FIPS code: 13-17328
- GNIS feature ID: 0355210
- Website: cityofcochran.com

Cochran is a city and the county seat of Bleckley County, Georgia, United States. As of the 2020 census, the city had a population of 5,026.

Cochran is named for Judge Arthur E. Cochran and was incorporated on March 19, 1869. Judge Cochran was largely instrumental in developing this section of Georgia through his work as president of the Macon and Brunswick Railroad, now the Southern Railway (a component of Norfolk Southern Railway). Once known as Dykesboro, Cochran was settled by B. B. Dykes, who owned the land on which the town is built. The earliest settlers located here to work in the turpentine industry.

Cochran is home to Bleckley County High School and Middle Georgia State University. The city's nickname, Castle City, comes from the similar theme the mascots of each school's athletic program share (Barons, Royals, and Knights).

Three properties in Cochran are listed on the National Register of Historic Places: the Bleckley County Courthouse in Courthouse Square, the Cochran Municipal Building and School at the junction of Dykes and Second streets, and Hillcrest at 706 Beech Street.

== History ==
Cochran, originally known as Dykesboro, was settled in the 1850s by B. B. Dykes. It was renamed Cochran in 1869 after Arthur Cochran, a railroad official who brought the Macon and Brunswick Railroad to town. In 1912, Cochran was designated seat of the newly formed Bleckley County.

== Geography ==
Cochran is located at 32°23′12″N 83°21′2″W (32.386646, -83.350684).

The city is located in the central part of the state along U.S. Route 23, which runs from southeast to northwest to the northeast of downtown, leading northwest 40 mi (64 km) to Macon and southeast 18 mi (29 km) to Eastman. Georgia State Route 26 runs from southwest to northeast through the center of the city, leading northeast 21 mi (34 km) to Dudley (after meeting U.S. Route 80), and southwest 11 mi (18 km) to Hawkinsville, concurrent with U.S. Route 129 Alternate.

According to the United States Census Bureau, the city has a total area of 4.7 square miles (12.3 km^{2}), of which 4.6 square miles (11.9 km^{2}) is land and 0.15 square miles (0.4 km^{2}), or 3.63%, is water.

== Demographics ==
Historical population
Census	Pop.	Note	%±
1900	1,531		—
1910	1,638		7.0%
1920	2,021		23.4%
1930	2,267		12.2%
1940	2,464		8.7%
1950	3,357		36.2%
1960	4,714		40.4%
1970	5,161		9.5%
1980	5,121		−0.8%
1990	4,390		−14.3%
2000	4,455		1.5%
2010	5,150		15.6%
2020	5,026		−2.4%
U.S. Decennial Census

=== 2020 census ===
As of the 2020 census, Cochran had a population of 5,026. The median age was 28.1 years. About 26.7% of residents were under the age of 18 and 14.8% were age 65 or older. For every 100 females there were 111.1 males, and for every 100 females age 18 and over there were 100.9 males age 18 and over.

According to the 2020 census, 96.4% of residents lived in urban areas and 3.6% lived in rural areas.

There were 1,621 households in Cochran, of which 38.1% had children under the age of 18 living in them. Of all households, 37.4% were married-couple households, 17.5% were households with a male householder and no spouse or partner present, and 40.5% were households with a female householder and no spouse or partner present. About 31.0% of all households were made up of individuals and 15.1% had someone living alone who was age 65 or older. There were 814 families residing in the city.

There were 1,902 housing units, of which 14.8% were vacant. The homeowner vacancy rate was 3.1% and the rental vacancy rate was 11.5%.

Cochran racial makeup as of 2020
Race	Num.	Perc.
White	2,612	51.97%
Black or African American	1,854	36.89%
Native American	3	0.06%
Asian	112	2.23%
Pacific Islander	4	0.08%
Other/Mixed	133	2.65%
Hispanic or Latino	308	6.13%

== Education ==
=== Bleckley County School District ===
Bleckley County students in kindergarten to grade twelve are in the Bleckley County School District, which consists of a primary school, an elementary school, a middle school and a high school. The district has 151 full-time teachers and over 2,355 students.

- Bleckley County Learning Center
- Bleckley County Primary School
- Bleckley County Elementary School
- Bleckley County Middle School
- Bleckley County Success Academy
- Bleckley County High School

=== Middle Georgia State University ===
Middle Georgia State University is a public university with its main campus in Macon, Georgia. It was founded in 2013 through the merger of Middle Georgia College and Macon State College. Middle Georgia College's main campus in Cochran is now one of the multiple campuses of Middle Georgia State University.

== Government ==
Cochran operates under a Mayor-Council system of government, with the day-to-day business being handled by a city manager. The interim city manager is Angela Redding. The Mayor is Carla Coley. The Police Chief is Jeff Trawick, and the fire chief is Brock Wilcher.

In 2016, at a City Council meeting held on October 11, Mayor Michael Stoy resigned from office, alleging that certain City Council members had participated in an illegal meeting. Since there was more than a year remaining in his term, a special election was held to elect another Mayor.

In 2013, the city manager decided to terminate the employment of the police and fire chief, and replace them with a public safety director in order to save money, but rescinded his decision days later amidst public disapproval, and announced the appointment of a task force to look at the budget and advise him on choices.

In 2011, Mayor Cliff Avant was charged with felony theft for allegedly donating city-owned PVC pipe to a local church. He admitted the donation and the mistake of not having it declared surplus property by the city council. On the day of the trial, as a result of a plea deal, Avant resigned as mayor, and pleaded guilty to a charge of criminal trespass.

In 2008, some of the Cochran Police Force came under scrutiny for various acts of misconduct, which included child molestation charges. One officer was charged and another resigned after being investigated for interference with custody.

== Tourist attractions ==
- Cochran-Bleckley Cotton & Peanut Museum
- Terry L. Coleman Museum and Archives
- Old Bleckley County Jail
- Tessie W. Norris Cochran-Bleckley Library
- Cochran Bleckley County Recreation Department
- Uchee Trail Country Club
- Jellystone Park - Cochran
- Cochran Motor Speedway
- Lil Cochran R/C Speedway & Hobbies

== Notable people ==
- Danny Mathis - Politician and coroner.
- Nancye Radmin (1938–2020), American businesswoman, founder of The Forgotten Woman retail chain
- Clarence Reid, a.k.a. Blowfly - musician and songwriter
- Ed Roberts - Physician and founder of MITS where he created the Altair 8800 microcomputer, starting the microcomputer revolution. It featured Microsoft's first software, the Altair BASIC and employed Bill Gates, Paul Allen, and Monte Davidoff.
- Obie Walker - claimant of the World Colored Heavyweight Championship boxing title in the 1930s
- Amarius Mims - NFL player
