= Georgia's 144th House of Representatives district =

State district in Georgia, USA

Georgia's 144th State House of Representatives district
Representative
Dale Washburn; R–Macon
- Demographics: 66.6% White; 29.3% Black; 2.3% Hispanic; 0.4% Asian
- Population: 52,149

District 144 elects one member of the Georgia House of Representatives. It contains the entirety of Jasper County as well as parts of Bibb County, Jones County, Monroe County and Putnam County.

== Members ==
- Terry Coleman (2005–2007)
- Jimmy Pruett (2007–2008)
- Bubber Epps (2008–2019)
- Danny Mathis (2019–2023)
- Dale Washburn (since 2023)
