= Robert Pruitt (politician) =

American politician

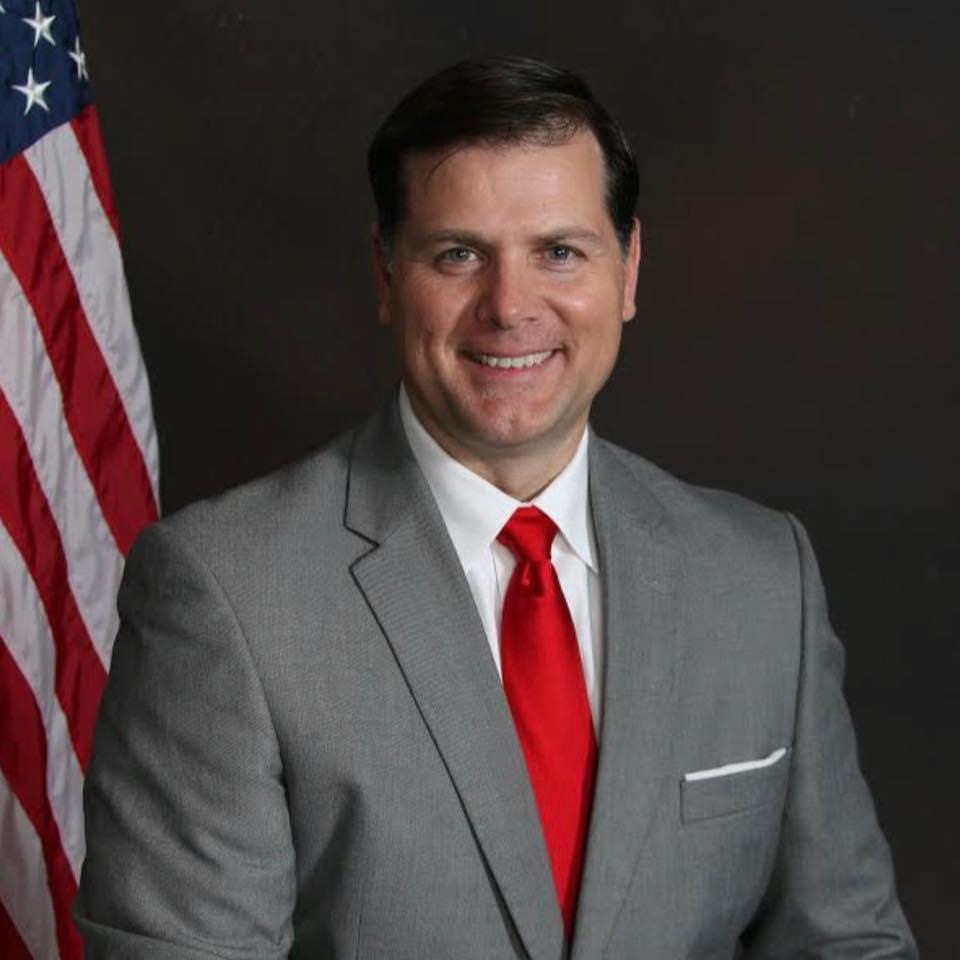
- Robert Pruitt in 2020

Member of the Georgia House of Representatives from the 149th district
- In office January 11, 2021 – January 9, 2023
- Preceded by: Jimmy Pruett
- Succeeded by: Danny Mathis

Personal details
- Born: Fort Bragg, North Carolina, US
- Party: Republican
- Spouse: Kelly Rogers Pruitt (m. 1996)
- Children: 3
- Education: Heart of Georgia Technical Institute; Middle Georgia College (AS); Embry-Riddle Aeronautical University (BS)
- Website: House website

Robert Pruitt is an American politician and businessman from Georgia. Pruitt served as a Republican member of the Georgia House of Representatives for District 149 from January 2021 to January 2023.

== Early life ==
Robert Pruitt was born in Fort Bragg, North Carolina. His parents were serving in the U.S. Army at the time of his birth and were stationed at Fort Bragg. Throughout the course of his childhood, Pruitt lived in Germany; Oklahoma; Orlando, Florida; Augusta, Georgia; Japan; and Chauncey, Georgia. Pruitt has lived in Georgia for the majority of his life.

== Education ==
Pruitt attended Heart of Georgia Technical Institute in Eastman and obtained a diploma in Flight Technology in 1997. He was a member of the first graduating class of this institute. Pruitt attended Middle Georgia College and obtained a degree of Associate of Applied Science in 1997 also. In 2000, Pruitt obtained a Bachelors of Science degree in Professional Aeronautics from Embry-Riddle Aeronautical University.

== Career ==
Pruitt is a pilot, pilot instructor, businessman, and entrepreneur. Pruitt is chief executive officer and President of SoPoly Outdoor Furniture.

On June 9, 2020, Pruitt won the Republican primary election and was unopposed in the general election on November 3, 2020, therefore he became a Republican member of Georgia House of Representatives for District 149.

On January 11, 2021, Pruitt was sworn in as a member of the Georgia House of Representatives for District 149 succeeding Jimmy Pruett.

While a member of the House, Pruitt served on the House Economic Development & Tourism Committee, the House Industry and Labor Committee, & the House Small Business and Development Committee.

On January 9, 2023, he left office and Danny Mathis replaced him.

Following his departure from the Georgia House of Representatives, he became executive director of the Eastman-Dodge County Development Authority.

== Personal life ==
Pruitt's wife is Kelly Rogers Pruitt. They have three children. Pruitt and his family reside in Eastman, Georgia.

Georgia House of Representatives
Preceded by Jimmy Pruett	Member of the Georgia House of Representatives from the 149th district 2021–2023	Succeeded by Danny Mathis
