= Hillcrest (Cochran, Georgia) =

Historic house in Georgia, United States

- U.S. National Register of Historic Places
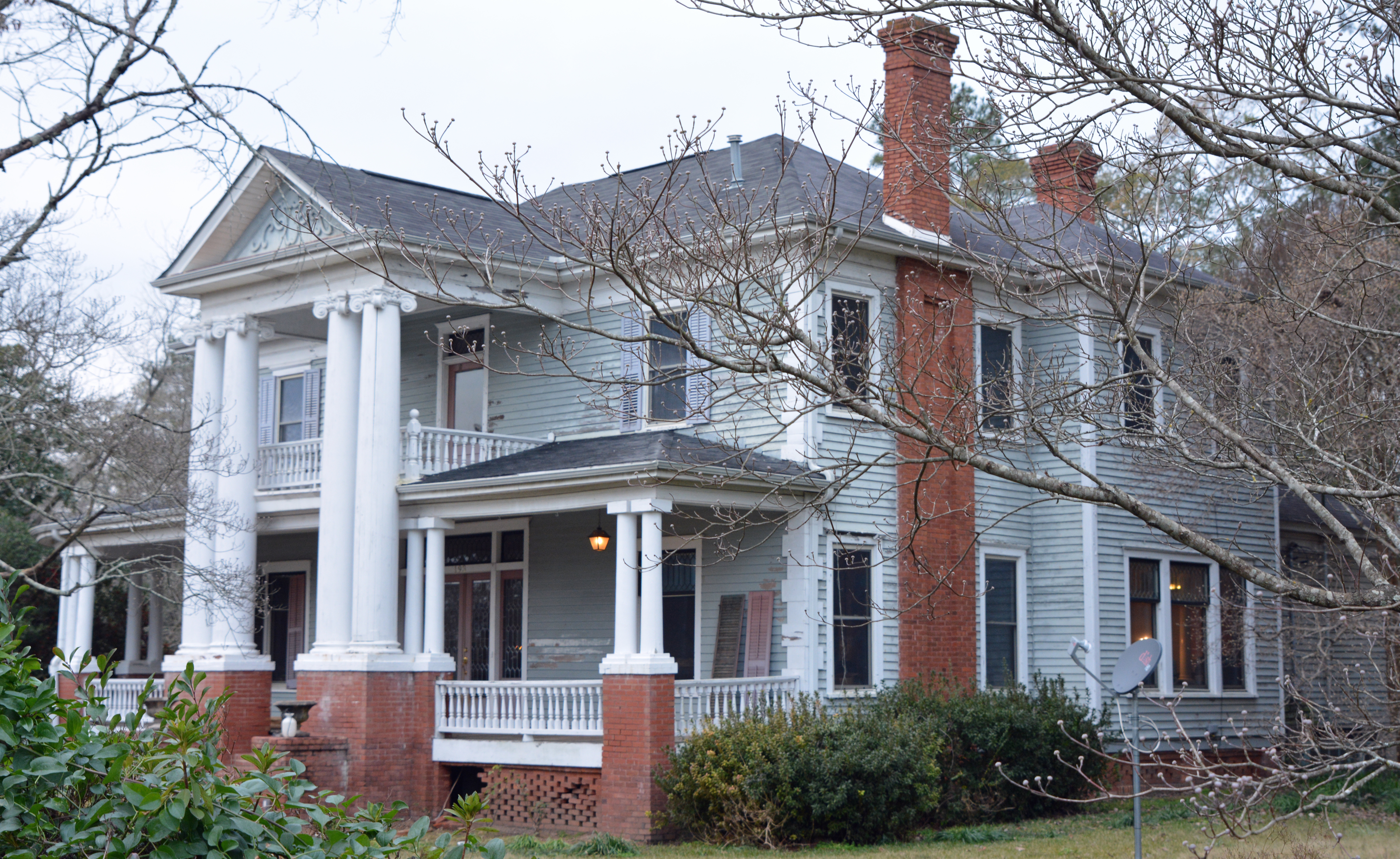
- Hillcrest in 2016

- Location within Georgia Location within the United States
- Location: 706 Beech St., Cochran, Georgia
- Coordinates: 32.39405°N 83.35119°W
- Area: 1.3 acres (0.53 ha)
- Built: 1910
- Architectural style: Classical Revival
- NRHP reference No.: 83000184
- Added to NRHP: April 21, 1983

Hillcrest, also known as Cedar Hall, is a historic two-story house at 706 Beech Street in Cochran, Georgia. Hillcrest is an early-20th century home of Classical Revival architecture.

== History and preservation ==
Hillcrest was added to the National Register of Historic Places in 1983. It was deemed significant architecturally as a "fine example of a turn-of-the-century Neoclassical style house in Cochran." Neoclassical features include its monumental portico, large rooms, and details in its interior, such as paneled wainscoting, built-ins, and Ionic columns and urns in stairways and room dividers.

It was also deemed of local historical importance for its association with two prominent families, those of John Joseph Taylor (1855–1917) and of John Augustus Walker. Taylor was president of the Cochran Banking Company, the builder of Cochran's opera house, and owner of a general store and of a cotton mill and warehouse. Taylor built "Hillcrest" next door to his own home, as a wedding present for the 1910 marriage of his daughter Alice with John Augustus Walker. Walker was Cochran's postmaster during 1933–1941 and also worked for the bank. The house remained in the family until 1965.

Dr. Virlon Griner, pastor of Cochran's First Baptist Church, began its restoration during his ownership 1970–1981.

== See also ==
- National Register of Historic Places listings in Bleckley County, Georgia
