= Terry Coleman =

American politician (born 1943)

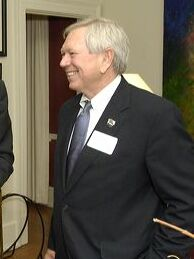
- Coleman in 2006

Speaker of the Georgia House of Representatives
- In office January 13, 2003 – January 10, 2005
- Preceded by: Tom Murphy
- Succeeded by: Glenn Richardson

Member of the Georgia House of Representatives
- In office January 8, 1973 – January 8, 2007
- Succeeded by: Jimmy Pruett
- Constituency: 102nd district, Post 1 (1973–1975); 118th district (1975–1993); 142nd district (1993–2003); 118th district (2003–2005); 144th district (2005–2007)

Personal details
- Born: Terry Lewis Coleman; December 5, 1943 (age 82) Eastman, Georgia, U.S.
- Party: Democratic
- Education: Reinhardt College, A.A. Brenau College, B.S. 1981; Woodrow Wilson College of Law, J.D. 1981
- Occupation: Insurance broker

Terry Lewis Coleman (born December 5, 1943) is an American politician from the state of Georgia. He was a member of the Georgia General Assembly for 34 years and served as Speaker of the House for two years.

== Early life and education ==
Coleman was born on December 5, 1943 in Dodge County, Georgia. He attended Dodge County High School where he played football and graduated in 1961. He then attended Georgia Southern University, but did not graduate. He served in the Georgia National Guard from 1965 to 1971.

Around 1977, he enrolled in Reinhardt College where he earned an associate degree. He received a Bachelor of Science in criminal justice from Brenau University in 1981. He received a Juris Doctor from the Woodrow Wilson College of Law, also in 1981. He also graduated from the Georgia Police Academy.

== Career ==
Coleman helped with Marvin Griffin's campaign for Governor of Georgia in 1962. In 1966, he worked with Jimmy Carter's campaign for governor. He stayed in touch with Carter, eventually working for Carter along with two of his brothers.

Coleman was elected to the Georgia House of Representatives in 1972. His term representing the 14th District started in January 1973. In part due to his relationship with Carter, he was chairman of the Public Service Committee from 1978 to 1986. He chaired the Natural Resources Committee from 1987 to 1988, the Ways and Means Committee from 1989 to 1990, the Joint Committee on Budget Responsibility Oversight Committee, and the House Appropriations Committee from 1991 to 1992. He was also a member of the Budget Conference Committee.

Coleman was elected as the Speaker of the House in 2003 and 2004. While he was Speaker, he cast the deciding vote to change the Georgia state flag, which included the Confederate battle flag. In 2004, he was named Speaker Emeritus and served in this capacity until he left the legislature. He did not run for re-election in 2006, ending his 34 years with the House in January 2007.

He served as a deputy commissioner for the Georgia Department of Agriculture from 2007 to 2010. He stepped down to run for Commissioner of the Georgia Department of Labor. He lost by less than 600 votes.

Coleman ran his family's store, but decided to sell it after owning it for ten years. He then founded Coleman and Company Benefits, Inc., an insurance agency. He also owns two Huddle House franchises. He was president of the East Coleman Chamber of Commerce from 1985 to 1987. He served on the board of directors of the Colony Bank Corporation and the Bank of Dodge County.

== Honors ==
In 2008, Georgia Southern University presented Coleman with its President's Medal.

== Personal life ==
Coleman is married to Carol Cofield. They have two sons: Tracy Coleman and Brett Coleman.

Coleman served on the board of governors of Mercer University School of Medicine and the board of trustees of the Philadelphia College of Osteopathic Medicine and Georgia Southern University. He was a member of the Eastman Volunteer Fire Department for 23 years. He also belongs to the First Methodist Church of Eastman.

== See also ==
- List of speakers of the Georgia House of Representatives

Georgia House of Representatives
Preceded by Clarence G. Ezzard, Sr	Member of the Georgia House of Representatives from the 102nd district, Post 1; 1973–1975	Succeeded by David Lucas
Preceded by William Mobley Howell	Member of the Georgia House of Representatives from the 118th district 1975–1993	Succeeded by Henry L. Howard
Preceded by Bobby Long	Member of the Georgia House of Representatives from the 142nd district 1993–2003	Succeeded by Ron Borders
Preceded by Henry L. Howard	Member of the Georgia House of Representatives from the 118th district 2003–2005	Succeeded by Ben Harbin
Preceded by C. Ellis Black	Member of the Georgia House of Representatives from the 144th district 2005–2007	Succeeded by Jimmy Pruett
Political offices
Preceded by Tom Murphy	Speaker of the Georgia House of Representatives; January 13, 2003-January 10, 2005	Succeeded by Glenn Richardson
