= Macon State College =

Defunct public universities and colleges in Georgia, Macon, US (1965–2013)

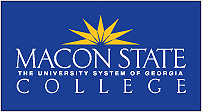
- Former names: Macon Junior College (1968–1987); Macon College (1987–1996)
- Type: Public
- Active: 1965–2013
- Location: Macon, Georgia, USA; 32.80716°N 83.732226°W
- Colors: Blue and Gold
- Mascot: The Blue Storm
- Merged with Middle Georgia College into Middle Georgia State College on January 8, 2013; institution was renamed Middle Georgia State University on July 1, 2015.

Macon State College was a four-year state college unit of the University System of Georgia. On Jan. 8, 2013, it was merged with Middle Georgia College into a new institution, Middle Georgia State College, which was renamed on July 1, 2015 to Middle Georgia State University.

Macon State College was formerly Macon College and Macon Junior College. It was located in Macon, Georgia, with a satellite campus in Warner Robins, Georgia as well as the Robins Resident Center, located on Robins Air Force Base. The Macon, Warner Robins and Robins Resident Center campuses and facilities remain in operation and now are part of Middle Georgia State University.

Most of the academic degree programs that had been offered at Macon State were retained during the consolidation.

Macon State began residence life programs in the fall 2010 when the college started offering housing and expanded student life activities. The college took over operation of a 300+ unit apartment complex adjacent to the Macon campus and renamed the complex College Station. The apartments, which are still in operation by Middle Georgia State University, are student-only units with resident advisers and security on site.

Macon State's main campus also became the main campus of Middle Georgia State University. The campus is located on more than 400 acres (1.6 km^{2}) on College Station Drive, along Eisenhower Parkway (US 80), in western Bibb County, Georgia. The Warner Robins campus, with three administrative and academic buildings, is located on 79 acres (320,000 m^{2}) Watson Boulevard, just a half-mile from the main gate of Robins Air Force Base. The Robins Resident Center is located in one of the many office buildings located on the Air Force base.

In addition to the Macon and Warner Robins campuses, Middle Georgia State University also continues to operate the three campuses that were part of the former Middle Georgia College. Those campuses are located in Cochran, Eastman and Dublin.

== Presidents of Macon State College ==
- 1968-72: Jack K. Carlton, the first president of the institution
- 1972-84: William W. Wright
- 1984-85: Jack Ragland, served as interim president
- 1985-97: Dr. S. Aaron Hyatt
- 1998–2011: Dr. David A. Bell
- 2011-2012: Dr. Jeffery S. Allbritten
- 2012–2013: Dr. John Black, interim president

== History ==
The history of Macon State College began in 1965, when the University System of Georgia's Board of Regents passed a resolution to create a public two-year college in central Georgia. Subsequently, the voters of Bibb County approved a bond issue to fund the college.

Macon Junior College, as it was then known, opened its doors in 1968 to the largest enrollment ever for a new state college in Georgia. In 1970, the Board of Regents directed Macon Junior College to serve civilian and military employees at Robins Air Force Base. The Robins Resident Center, located on the base, was subsequently established.

As several other junior colleges had recently gained four-year status, many speculated that Macon's would as well. However, the change took some time. It was not until 1983 that a statewide needs assessment indicated that the Macon area was underserved by state higher education. In 1987, the Regents removed "Junior" from the college's name but Macon College remained a two-year school.

In 1989, the college's president, Dr. S. Aaron Hyatt, asked the state to grant the college senior status. The following year, 25,000 local citizens signed a petition supporting the move, but state budget cuts prevented the issue from advancing.

Over the next several years, the topic was repeatedly discussed, and "senior status" was often recommended by University System consultants, but it would be 1996 before the Regents finally approved a change in mission and the introduction of the Bachelor of Science degree. Later that year, the school became known as "Macon State College" to indicate the new status. Both changes formally took effect in 1997. The first bachelor's degrees were awarded in May 1999.

During the fall 2007 convocation President David Bell announced the college would reorganize from divisions into schools—the School of Arts and Sciences, the School of Education, the School of Information Technology, the School of Nursing & Health Sciences, and the School of Business.

In April 2010, the president announced that the college had assumed operations of a 300+ apartment complex adjacent to the Macon campus. The units were available only to Macon State students and opened as student housing for the Fall 2010 semester.

In the fall of 2010, Dr. Bell announced that he would end his term as president in June 2011. In July 2011, Dr. Jeffery S. Allbritten, who had been serving as president of the Collier County Campus of Edison State College in Naples, Florida, assumed office as Macon State's new president. He held the position for only 12 months and left in June 2012, to be replaced by Dr. John Black, who began in July 2012 and served as interim president.

In January 2012, the Board of Regents of the University System of Georgia approved the merger of the college with Middle Georgia College. The Board of Regents approved the name change to Middle Georgia State College on Tuesday, May 8, 2012 and also laid out a path for elevating the consolidated institution to university status after a review process. The Southern Association of Colleges and Schools, the regional accrediting agency, gave its approval of the consolidation in December 2012, and the Board of Regents acted to make the consolidation official, effective immediately, on Jan. 8, 2013. In a subsequent action, the college was elevated to university status on July 1, 2015 and renamed Middle Georgia State University.

== Points of interest ==
- Waddell Barnes Botanical Gardens
