= Georgia's 149th House of Representatives district =

State district in Georgia, USA

Georgia's 149th State House of Representatives district
Representative
Floyd Griffin; D–Milledgeville
- Demographics: 58.5% White; 34.1% Black; 5.8% Hispanic; 0.2% Asian
- Population: 52,835

District 149 elects one member of the Georgia House of Representatives. It contains parts of Baldwin County, Bibb County and Jones County.

== Members ==
- Gerald Greene (2005–2013)
- Jimmy Pruett (2013–2021)
- Robert Pruitt (2021–2023)
- Danny Mathis (2023–2025)
- Floyd Griffin (since 2025)
