= Bleckley County School District =

School district in Georgia (U.S. state)

Address
- 242 East Dykes Street Cochran, Georgia, 31014; United States
- Coordinates: 32.382533°N 83.359205°W

District information
- Grades: Pre-school - 12
- Superintendent: Dr. Steve J. Smith

Students and staff
- Enrollment: 2,355
- Faculty: 171

Other information
- Accreditation: Southern Association of Colleges and Schools; Georgia Accrediting Commission
- Fax: (478) 934-9595
- Website: www.bleckleyschools.org

The Bleckley County School District is a public school district in Bleckley County, Georgia, United States, based in Cochran.

The only school district in the county, it serves the communities of Cary, Allentown, and Cochran.

== Schools ==
The Bleckley County School District has one primary school (Pre-K - 2nd Grade), one elementary school (grades 3-5), one middle school (grades 6-8), one high school (grades 9-12), and one alternative school (grades 6-12).

Schools:

- Bleckley County Primary School (Grades Pre-K through 2nd)
- Bleckley County Elementary School (Grades 3-5)
- Bleckley County Middle School (Grades 6-8)
- Bleckley County High School (Grades 9-12)

Alternative school:

- Bleckley County Success Academy (Grades 6-12)
