= Bleckley County Courthouse =

Historic courthouse in the United States

- U.S. National Register of Historic Places
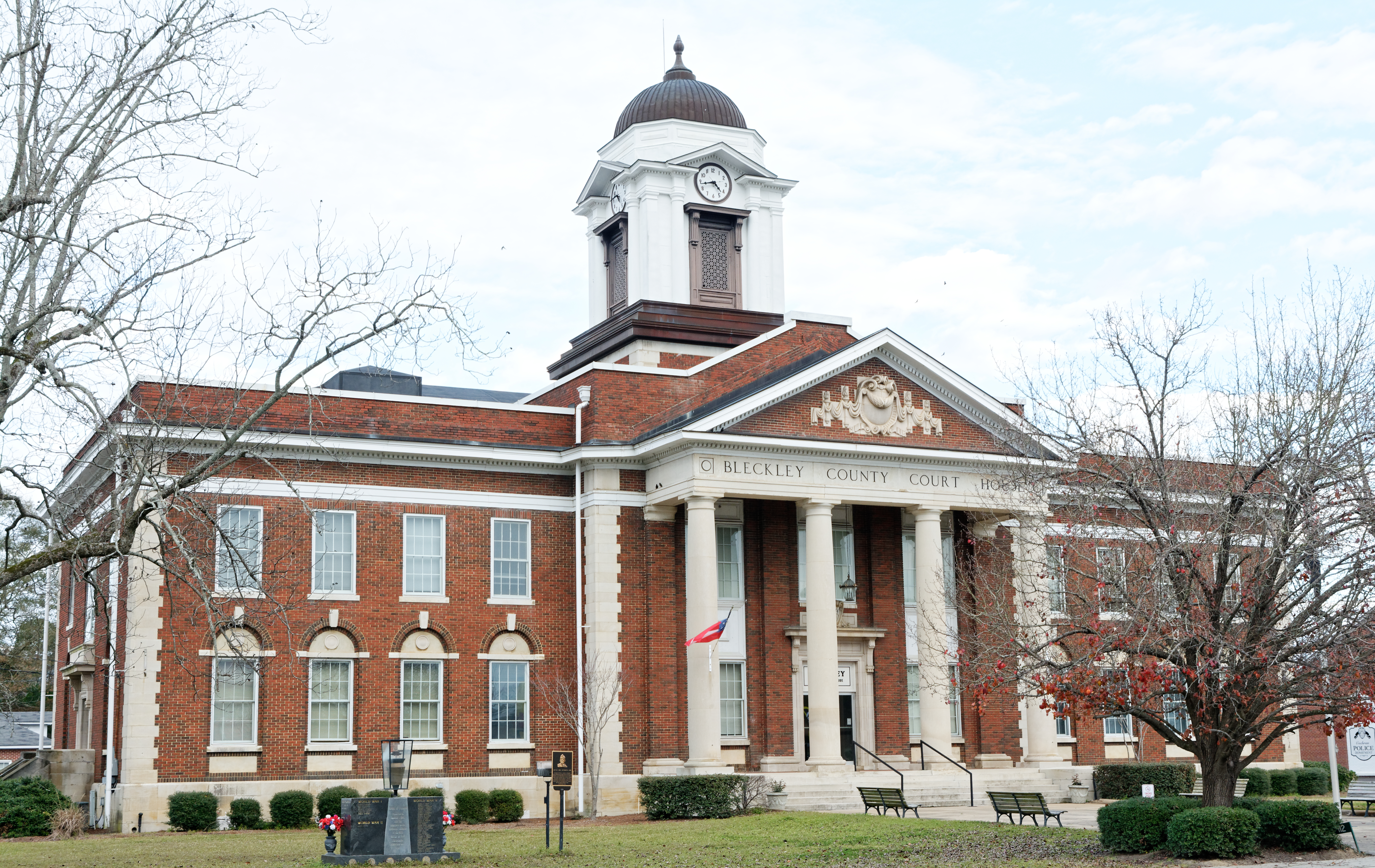

- Location within Georgia Location within the United States
- Interactive map showing the location of Bleckley County Courthouse
- Location: Courthouse Sq., Cochran, Georgia
- Coordinates: 32°23′15″N 83°21′20″W
- Area: 1 acre (0.40 ha)
- Built: 1914
- Built by: Little, Cleckler Construction Co.
- Architect: J.J. Baldwin
- Architectural style: Classical Revival
- MPS: Georgia County Courthouses TR
- NRHP reference No.: 80000975
- Added to NRHP: September 18, 1980

Bleckley County Courthouse is the historic county courthouse of Bleckley County. It is located at Second Street on Courthouse Square in the county seat of Cochran. It was listed on the National Register of Historic Places on September 18, 1980.

== History ==
Bleckley County was formed in 1912. The county jail and courthouse were erected the following year. The county courthouse opened on January 1, 1914, and has continuously been the county's courthouse since. The courthouse predates the city hall and city auditorium, which were built in 1928.

The architect J.J. Baldwin of the architectural firm of Gayre & Baldwin designed the courthouse, one of eight Georgia courthouses designed by Baldwin. The building is in the Classical Revival style. It is made of brick, with white columns and stone trim. Wilbur W. Caldwell writes that while the building it "pleasant and serviceable ... it lacks exuberance and flair," and it is one indication that by 1912, "the age of flamboyant courthouse building was over in Georgia," as county courthouse design became more restrained.

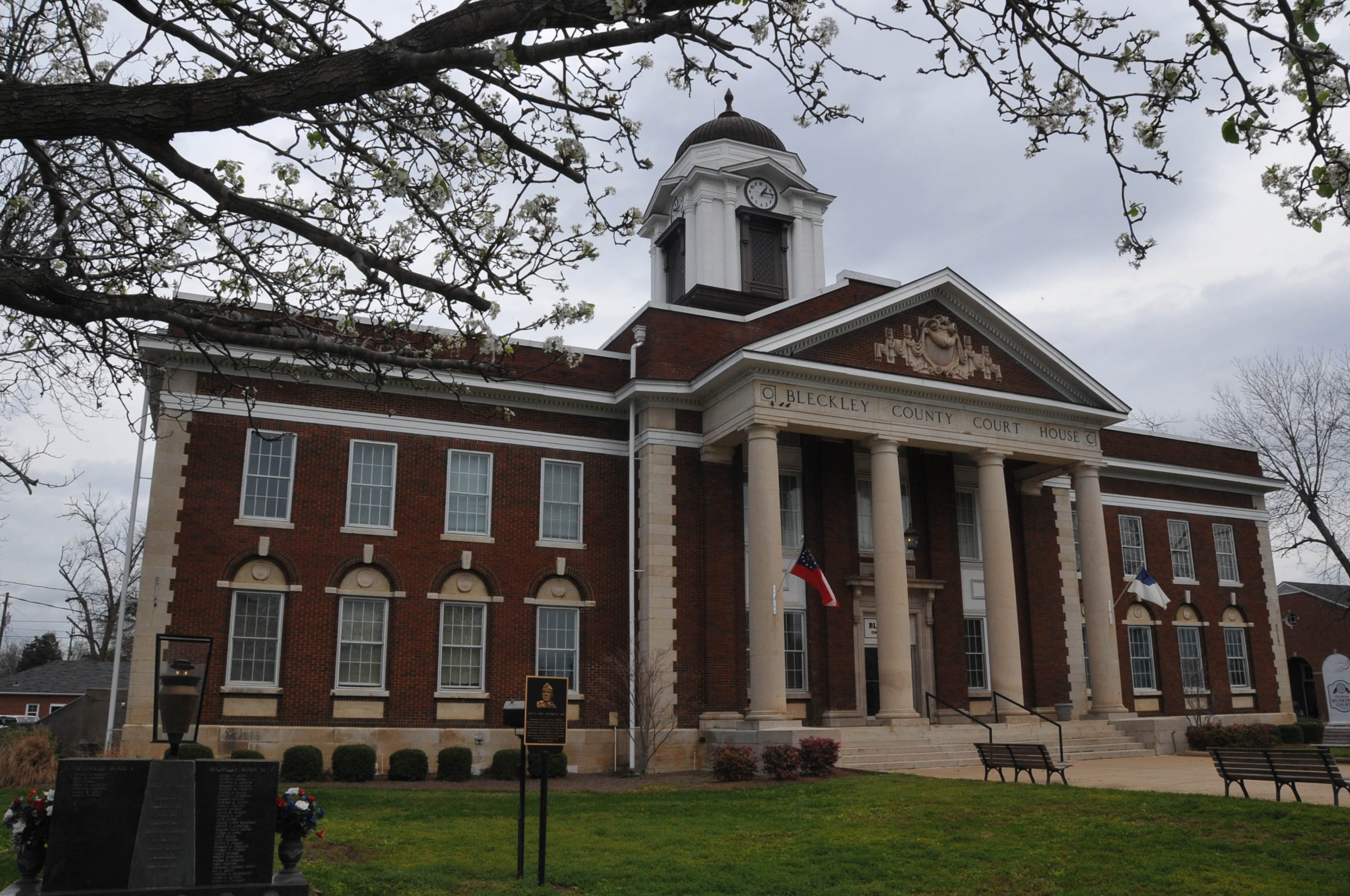
The courthouse

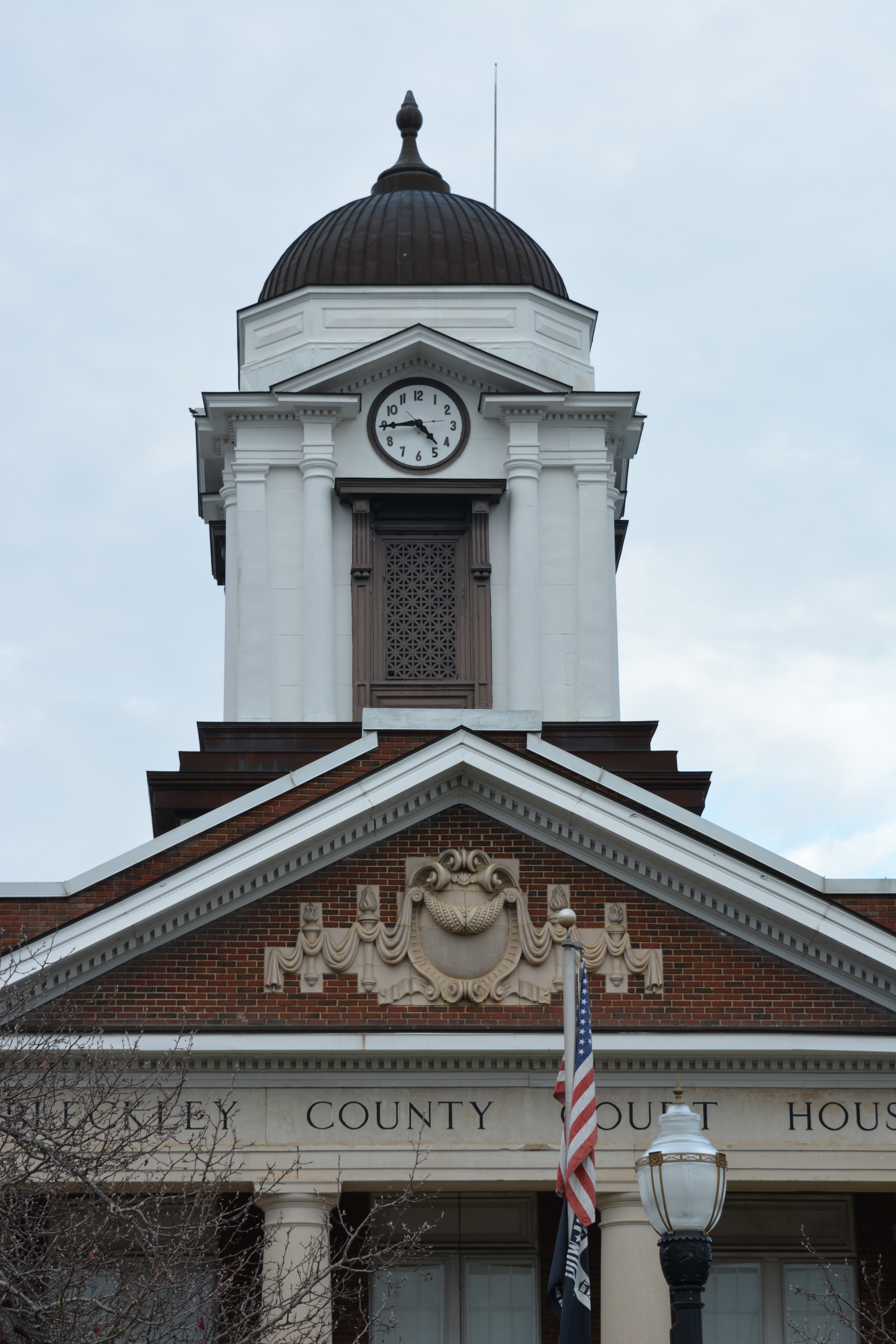
Closer

== See also ==
- National Register of Historic Places listings in Bleckley County, Georgia
