= Waddell Barnes Botanical Gardens =

Botanical gardens in Macon, Georgia, U.S.

Coordinates: 32.80716°N 83.732226°W

- Interactive map of Waddell Barnes Botanical Gardens
- Status: Closed
- Website: Official website

The Waddell Barnes Botanical Gardens was a botanical garden located on the campus of Middle Georgia State University, Macon, Georgia, spanning 167 acres (68 hectares). The garden is no longer active and has become a part of the university campus.

The gardens were established in 1967 and was designed by landscape architect Clay Adamson when the construction of Macon Junior College began. Initially, planting consisted of more than 1,600 trees, 2,500 shrubs, and 12,000 ground cover plants. Thirty years later, Dr. Waddell Barnes, chair of trustees, led the effort to create botanical gardens across campus to a master plan by Robert and Company. In 2003 the gardens were named in Dr. Barnes' honor.

The garden was divided into 16 gardens: Asian, European, Fall Colors, Fragrant, Fruit Trees, Industry, Medicinal, Natives, Showy Flowers, Showy Fruit, Shrubs and Vines, Southern Traditional, Touch & Feel, Urban Environment, Wet Environment, and Xeriscape.

== See also ==
- List of botanical gardens in the United States
