= Andrico Hines =

American football player (born 1980)

No. 10
- Position: Quarterback

Personal information
- Born: December 10, 1980 (age 45)
- Listed height: 6 ft 2 in (1.88 m)
- Listed weight: 215 lb (98 kg)

Career information
- High school: Riverdale (Riverdale, Georgia)
- College: Middle Tennessee State
- NFL draft: 2004: undrafted

Career history
- South Georgia Wildcats (2005); Chattahoochee Valley Vipers (2006); Spokane Shock (2007); South Georgia Wildcats (2008); Bossier–Shreveport Battle Wings (2009); Alabama Vipers (2010); Albany Panthers (2010); Cleveland Gladiators (2011); Pittsburgh Power (2012); Cleveland Gladiators (2013)

Career AFL statistics
- Comp. / Att.: 142 / 239
- Passing yards: 1,742
- TD–INT: 32–7
- Passer rating: 103.23
- Rushing TDs: 2
- Stats at ArenaFan.com

Andrico Hines (born December 10, 1980) is an American former professional football quarterback who played three seasons in the Arena Football League (AFL) with the Cleveland Gladiators and Pittsburgh Power. He played college football at Middle Georgia College, Southwest Mississippi Community College, and Middle Tennessee State University. Hines was also a member of the South Georgia Wildcats, Chattahoochee Valley Vipers, Spokane Shock, Bossier–Shreveport Battle Wings and Alabama Vipers.

== Early life ==
Hines played high school football at Riverdale High School in Riverdale, Georgia, and was a four-year starter at quarterback. He helped the Raiders to a 13–1 record as a senior and a berth in the semifinals of the state playoffs. He was also named all-State, all-County and all-Region his senior year. Hines set a state record with five touchdowns in a state playoff game.

== College career ==
Hines first played college football for the Middle Georgia Warriors of Middle Georgia College. He transferred to play for the Southwest Mississippi Bears of Southwest Mississippi Community College. He was named to the Mississippi JUCO All-Star team in 2000. Hines completed 101 of 158 pass attempts for 1,319 yards for 15 touchdowns and four interceptions. He transferred to play for the Middle Tennessee Blue Raiders of Middle Tennessee State University from 2002 to 2003. He recorded 13 touchdowns on 3,495 passing yards for the Blue Raiders while also rushing for 801 yards and 16 touchdowns.

== Professional career ==
Hines played for the South Georgia Wildcats of the af2 during the 2005 season. He played for the Chattahoochee Valley Vipers of the American Indoor Football League during the 2006 season. He tore his ACL in the third game of the 2006 season. Hines played for the Spokane Shock of the af2 in 2007. He helped the Shock to the playoffs, completing 64% of his passes for over 2,800 yards while recording 62 touchdowns and 8 interceptions. He played for the South Georgia Wildcats in 2008, recording 67 touchdown passes as the Wildcats won the AF2 south division title. Hines played for the af2's Bossier–Shreveport Battle Wings in 2009, recording 76 touchdowns and 11 interceptions on 3,214 passing yards. He was assigned to the Alabama Vipers of the AFL on November 30, 2009. He left the Vipers on June 15, 2010, after refusing to report and being suspended by the team. Hines signed with the Albany Panthers of the Southern Indoor Football League following his suspension from the Vipers. He was assigned to the AFL's Cleveland Gladiators on June 2, 2011. He completed 8 of 15 passes for 102 yards and two touchdowns as an AFL rookie for the Gladiators. Hines was assigned to the Pittsburgh Power of the AFL on January 30, 2012. He completed 134 of 224 passes for 1,640 yards and 30 touchdowns with seven interceptions for the Power in 2012. He signed with the Cleveland Gladiators on May 30, 2013. Hines appeared in one game for the Gladiators. He was reassigned by the team on June 4, 2013.

== Personal life ==
Since 2013, Hines has served as an offensive coordinator and head football coach at several high school in Georgia.
