= Bleckley County High School =

Public high school in Cochran, Georgia, United States

Location
- 1 Royal Drive; Cochran, Bleckley County, Georgia 31014; United States; 32°24′53″N 83°19′09″W

Information
- Type: Public
- School district: Bleckley County School District
- CEEB code: 110755
- Principal: Dr. Brad Knox
- Teaching staff: 44.10 FTE
- Grades: 9–12
- Enrollment: 680 (2023–2024)
- Student to teacher ratio: 15.32
- Colors: Purple and gold
- Athletics conference: 2 A - D1
- Nickname: Kings
- Team name: Royals
- Rival: Dodge County High School, Hawkinsville High School
- Accreditation: Southern Association of Colleges and Schools; Georgia Accrediting Commission
- Yearbook: The Scepter
- Website: hs.bleckley.k12.ga.us

Bleckley County High School is a high school in Cochran, Georgia, United States, 120 miles (190 km) south of Atlanta. The school reaches students in grades 9-12 from the town of Cochran and the rest of Bleckley County.

Bleckley County built a new high school that opened in the fall of 2005. In its final year, the previous building was the oldest non-renovated high school in the state of Georgia, and served as the county's pre-kindergarten facility before being demolished and rebuilt for the new Bleckley County Primary School in 2022. This original building was located on Dykes Street near downtown Cochran. The new Bleckley County High School is located at 1 Royal Drive just off of the Cochran Bypass and Airport Road. The football stadium is still located at the old high school and was renovated during the construction of the new primary school with new facilities, visitor bleachers, and a memorial entrance for past students and educators who have died.

Bleckley County High attained "Adequate Yearly Progress" for 2009, the only high school in Middle Georgia to do so besides schools in Houston County.

BCHS is a six-time region winner in the one-act play as well as literary competitions.

The football team made it to the elite eight in 2006. The boys' basketball team did so in 2007, and the baseball team did so in 2009. Girls' cross country has won seven straight region titles; the boys have won four straight. Bleckley girls' track won state in 2007 and finished state runner-up in 2009, boys' track placed best in school history with third in state in 2016. Both the boys' and girls' tennis teams have made multiple runs to the AA final four. BCHS cheerleading has won three state championships. The men's basketball team lost to Greater Atlanta Christian High School in GHSA AA State Basketball Final on March 8, 2013, by a score of 69 - 52.

Bleckley County High School FFA took the title of the 2017 National FFA Forestry CDE Champions in October 2017.

The school's golf team annually awards the Bruce Fleisher Award.

== Baseball Records ==
2020 3-AA Region Champs

2020 AA State Champs

== Notable alumni ==
- Amarius Mims (2021), college football offensive tackle for the Georgia Bulldogs, signed with the Cincinnati Bengals in the first round of the 2024 NFL Draft.
