= Mary Ann Whipple-Lue =

American politician

Mary Ann Whipple-Lue is the former mayor of Gordon, Georgia. Taking office in 2014, she served as the first Black and Female for one term as mayor, until 2017. Her tenure as the city's first black mayor was plagued with controversy.

Allegedly, "She mistreated city employees simply because she felt she was all powerful," wrote Reeves, a judge from the neighboring Middle Judicial Circuit who was assigned to the case after other judges disqualified themselves. "In short, she has not been a good mayor, but not being an effective leader is not sufficient under the standard established by our Supreme Court" as grounds for removal, Reeves wrote. Whipple-Lue is a graduate of Wilkinson County Senior High (1974) and holds a degree in Business Law from Georgia Military College. She ran in the 2012 election for Georgia House of Representatives District 144. She ran unopposed in the Democratic primary election on July 31, 2012, and later was defeated in the general election, which took place on November 6, 2012.
