= Jerry Zulli =

American college baseball coach (born 1978)

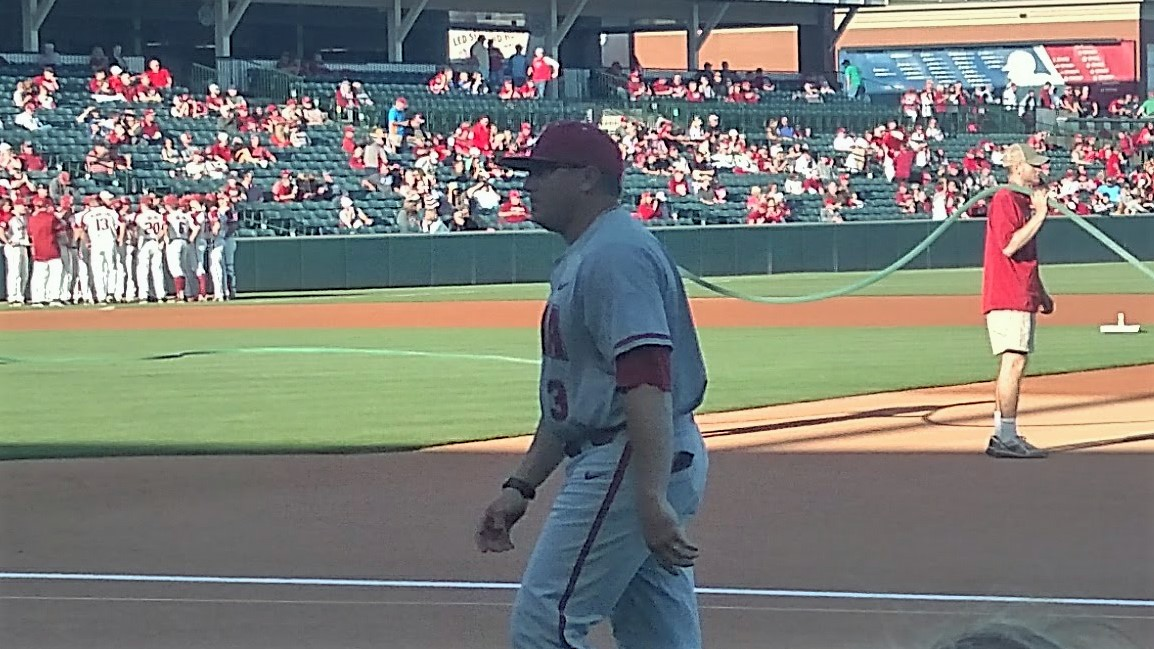

Biographical details
- Born: January 16, 1978 (age 48); New Orleans, Louisiana
- Education: Middle Georgia College (1999); University of New Orleans (2002)

Playing career
- 1998-1999: Middle Georgia
- 2000-2002: New Orleans

Coaching career (HC unless noted)
- 2002-2004: Middle Georgia College (asst.)
- 2005–2011: Memphis (asst.)
- 2012-2015: South Alabama (asst.)
- 2016: Missouri (asst.)
- 2017: Louisiana Tech (asst.)
- 2018–2021: Alabama (asst.)

Jerry Zulli (born January 16, 1978) is an American college baseball coach. He had built a reputation as a good recruiter—having helped Missouri and South Alabama assemble strong signing classes in his past.

== Coaching career ==
=== Middle Georgia College (2002-2004) ===
Zulli began his collegiate coaching career as the recruiting coordinator at Middle Georgia College from 2002-04. The Warriors went 130-51 in his three seasons, including two JUCO World Series appearances in 2002 and 2004. His 2002 team finished sixth nationally, while the 2004 squad wrapped up the season fourth in the national polls. In 2004, Zulli served as assistant coach of the Hyannis Mets, a collegiate summer baseball team in the Cape Cod Baseball League.

=== Memphis (2005-2011) ===
In his seven seasons at Memphis, Zulli helped the Tigers lead Conference USA in hitting and on-base percentage on three separate occasions, while ranking top-five in the league in virtually every hitting metric. He coached eight players to a combined 10 All-Conference USA honors, including Chad Zurcher, who was tabbed the 2011 C-USA Player of the Year and a Third Team All-American after leading the NCAA in average and on-base percentage. He also coached 12 players who were selected in the MLB Draft, including a five who were taken in the 2011 draft.

=== South Alabama (2012-2015) ===
During his four seasons at USA, Zulli coached nine of his hitters to All-Sun Belt Conference honors, one conference player of the year winner, an All-American and one Freshman All-America selection. His offenses at South Alabama ranked atop the Sun Belt in batting average twice (2012, 2015) and was second in 2013. His teaching made an immediate impact on the Jaguars in his first season, as the offense led the SBC in conference play in seven categories, including: average (.306), hits (321), RBI (184), runs scored (205), total bases (474), and on-base (.389) and slugging percentage (.452). Zulli assembled the 2016 signing class at South Alabama, a collection of talent that helped lead USA to the 2016 Sun Belt regular season co-championship and an NCAA Regional appearance. Three of his four seasons in Mobile featured top-50 recruiting classes, including a 2013 class that ranked 29th by Collegiate Baseball News. That class played a significant role for the 2015 Jaguar squad that won 37 games and the Sun Belt Conference Championship.

=== Missouri (2016) ===
Prior to his time at Tech, Zulli was with Missouri for one season in 2016, running the Tigers' offense while serving as recruiting coordinator, infield coach and third base coach. His time in Columbia was highlighted by his recruiting efforts, where he was responsible for adding seven recruits to the Tigers' recruiting class, including five of which who were selected in the 2016 MLB First-Year Player Draft. In addition to his recruits that were drafted, Zulli also had two of his players from the 2015-16 Missouri roster selected in Ryan Howard (5th Round, San Francisco Giants) and Jake Ring (31st Round, Baltimore Orioles).

=== Louisiana Tech (2017) ===
In his lone season at La Tech, Jerry Zulli's effort helped the Bulldogs rank in the top three in nearly every offensive category in Conference USA. The offense recorded a .313 average with 203 RBI and 213 runs scored while slugging .475 and sporting a .413 on-base percentage – all totals that were second in the league. Zulli coached four hitters to all-conference honors, including a pair of first-teamers in 2017. Brent Diaz, who was one of the Bulldogs' first team all-conference selections, was also tabbed a Third Team All-American by Collegiate Baseball News while earning a spot as a semifinalist for the Johnny Bench Award.

=== Alabama (2018-2021) ===
Zulli was hired as an assistant coach by head coach Brad Bohannon in the summer of 2017. In June 2021, it was announced that Zulli would be leaving Alabama to pursue interests outside of baseball.
