= Middle Georgia College =

Public college in Cochran, Georgia (1884–2013)

- Former names: New Ebenezer College (1884–1898); Middle Georgia Agricultural and Mechanical Junior College (1927–1929)
- Active: 1884–2013
- Location: Cochran, Georgia, U.S. 32.3799°N 83.3427°W
- Merged with Macon State College into Middle Georgia State College on January 8, 2013; institution was renamed Middle Georgia State University on July 1, 2015.

Middle Georgia College (MGC) was a four-year state college unit of the University System of Georgia, United States. On January 8, 2013, it was consolidated with Macon State College into a new institution, which is now known as Middle Georgia State University.

The college's main campus was in Cochran, and that campus is now a satellite campus of Middle Georgia State University. The campus continues to operate with the same facilities as it had before consolidation. MGC had two other campuses — located in Eastman and Dublin — and they also continue to operate as campuses of Middle Georgia State University.

== History ==
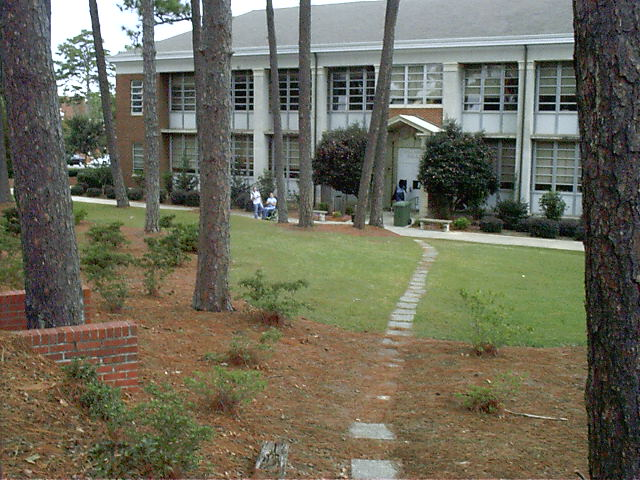
Dillard Hall

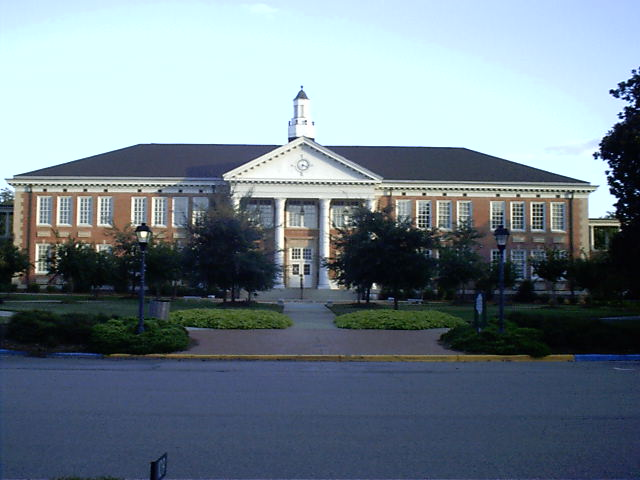
Walker Hall

Middle Georgia College dates back to the establishment of New Ebenezer College, which occupied the site of the current Cochran campus of Middle Georgia State University and was established in 1884 by the New Ebenezer Baptist Association. The association was composed largely of Baptist churches in Pulaski, Dodge, Laurens, and Telfair counties.

The first building on the campus was completed in 1886, and classes were first held in 1887 with approximately 100 students. During the early period, the institution was divided into preparatory and collegiate departments. A stated purpose of the curriculum, as described in the catalog of 1887, was "to prepare pupils for business or for the Junior Class in Universities. This includes Latin, Greek, Mathematics, Natural Science and several modern languages, with English studies and Music." The New Ebenezer Baptist Association discontinued their financial support for their namesake college in 1898, forcing the school to close its doors.

The college's building served as a high school for the city of Cochran until 1913, when the high school moved. No documentation exists regarding the facilities from 1913 to 1919, leading to the presumption that it was unoccupied during that time.

In 1919, the Georgia State College of Agricultural and Mechanic Arts (a division of the University of Georgia) opened a branch dedicated to serving the needs of the Twelfth congressional district in the building formerly used by New Ebenezer College. In 1927, the school's name was changed to Middle Georgia Agricultural and Mechanical Junior College, though it remained a branch of the state agricultural school. In 1929, the school's name was changed to Middle Georgia College and responsibility for its operation was given to a nine-person board of trustees.

MGC was finally made an independent institution in 1931, when it was created as one of the original units of the newly created University System of Georgia.

During World War II, MGC hosted the 50th College Training Detachment of the U.S. Army Air Force and graduated 17 classes of aviation students from March 1943- July 1944.

In 1964, Dr. Louis C. Alderman Jr. become president. Many new buildings as well as renovations of existing facilities marked his tenure in growing the college's reputation, academic excellence, and campus beauty. During this term, the Dublin Campus was opened in 1984. Dr. Alderman died on December 13, 1987, having served the longest term of any past or subsequent president of the college. Alderman Community Hall was dedicated to his memory on May 21, 2009.

A new program and campus was added to the school in 2007, when the Georgia Aviation Technical College in Eastman was merged with Middle Georgia College.

In January 2012, the Board of Regents of the University System of Georgia approved the consolidation of the college with Macon State College. The Board of Regents approved the name change to Middle Georgia State College on Tuesday, May 8, 2012, and also laid out a path for elevating the consolidated institution to university status after a review process. The Southern Association of Colleges and Schools, the regional accrediting agency, gave its approval of the consolidation in December 2012, and the Board of Regents acted to make the consolidation official, effective immediately, on Jan. 8, 2013.

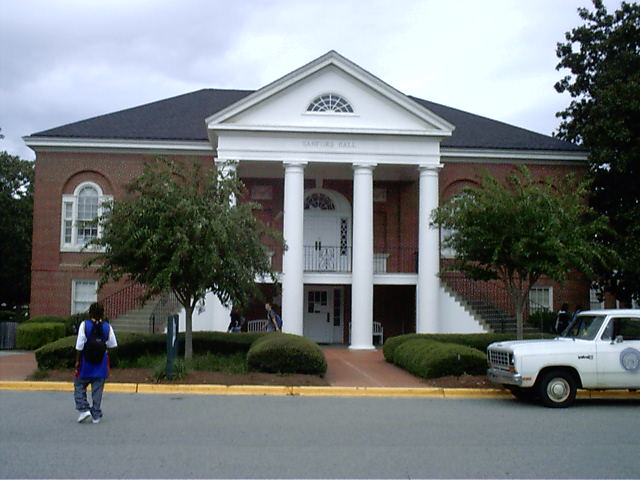
Sanford Hall

== Baseball program ==
The Middle Georgia College Warrior baseball team won 4 NJCAA national championships: •1979 •1980 •1982 •1995

The team reached the JUCO World Series 13 times: •1975, Third-Place Finish •1980 •1982 •1983, NJCAA Runner-Up •1984, Fourth-Place Finish •1990, NJCAA Runner-Up •1995 •1996, Third-Place Finish •2001 •2002 •2004 •2009

The Warriors won 38 conference, division, or region championships, and finished district runner-up 6 times.

== Notable alumni ==
- Antonio Cochran, former NFL player
- Andrico Hines, former AFL player
- Frank Jones, former college football coach
- Will Pettis, Arena Football Hall of Fame player
- Josh Reddick, Major League Baseball player
- George Thornewell Smith, politician
- James Arthur Williams, preservationist
- Kevin Young, head coach of BYU Cougars men's basketball
- Jerry Zulli, college baseball coach
