= WRNC =

WRNC may refer to:

- WRNC-LP, a defunct low-power student radio station on the campus of Northland College in Ashland, Wisconsin
- WRNC (North Carolina), a defunct radio station in Reidsville, North Carolina
- WRNC, former call letters of WPGC-FM, a commercial radio station in Morningside, Maryland
- WRNC, former call letters of WPJL, a non-commercial AM radio station, in Knightdale, North Carolina
- WRNC, former call letters of WMGE (AM), a radio station in Dry Branch, Georgia
- WRNC, former call letters of WIHB-FM, a radio station serving the Macon metropolitan area in central Georgia

== See also ==
- World Rugby Nations Championship
