= WIHB =

WIHB may refer to:

- WIHB (AM), a radio station (1280 AM) licensed to serve Macon, Georgia, United States
- WIHB-FM, a radio station (96.5 FM) licensed to serve Gray, Georgia
- WCKN, a radio station (92.5 FM) licensed to serve Moncks Corner, South Carolina, United States, which held the call sign WIHB from 2005 to 2011
