= WIBB =

WIBB may refer to:

- Sultan Syarif Kasim II Airport, in Pekanbaru, Riau
- WIBB-FM, a radio station at 97.9 FM licensed to Fort Valley, Georgia
- WIHB (AM), a radio station (1280 AM) licensed to serve Macon, Georgia, which held the call sign WIBB several times
- Wireless Broadband
