= Lizella, Georgia =

Lizella
- Unincorporated community
- Location within Georgia
- Coordinates: 32°48′26″N 83°49′12″W
- Country: United States
- State: Georgia
- County: Bibb, Crawford

Area
  - Land: 206.2 km^{2} (79.6 sq mi)
- Elevation: 171 m (561 ft)
- Time zone: UTC-5 (EST)
  - Summer (DST): UTC-4 (EDT)
- ZIP code: 31052
- Area code: 478

Lizella /laɪˈzɛlə/ ly-ZEL-ə is an unincorporated community in Bibb and Crawford counties in the U.S. state of Georgia. approximately 11 miles (18 km) southwest of Macon. It is part of the Macon Metropolitan Statistical Area.

U.S. Route 80 passes through Lizella.

== History ==
Lizella was established circa 1891, when the Macon and Birmingham Railroad Co. laid tracks to LaGrange amid a collection of farms west of Macon.

The settlement was originally named "Warrior". The first local postmaster, James A. Eubanks, drew the name "Lizella" from the names of his two daughters, Lizzie and Ella.

=== Mother's Day storm 2008 ===
On May 11, 2008, an EF2 tornado touched down in Lizella at 5:45 am. The storm caused extensive damage to parts of the Macon metropolitan area, and cleanup took more than a year.

== Recreation ==
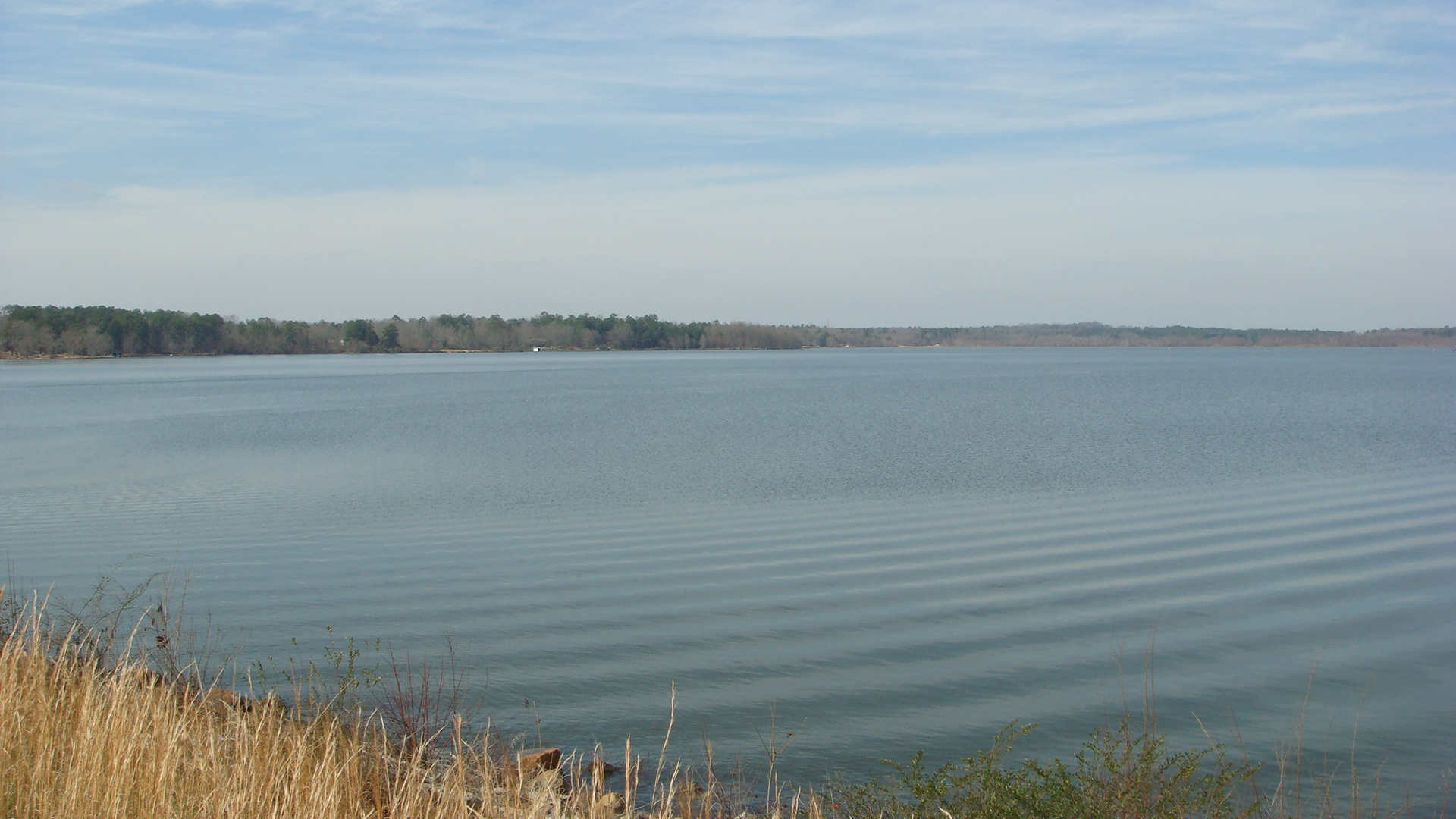
Lake Tobesofkee in winter

Lake Tobesofkee, less than a mile from Lizella, has three parks: Claystone Park and Sandy Beach Park, both located on Moseley-Dixon Road near I-475, and Arrowhead Park, on Columbus Road near U.S. 80. Each features covered picnic pavilions and restroom facilities.

Claystone and Sandy Beach parks have beaches and children's playgrounds. Sandy Beach also offers lighted tennis courts and a softball field for public use. The beaches are topped with white sand before each summer season. Each beach is staffed with lifeguards.

== Notable people ==
- Donald "Duck" Richardson, renowned basketball coach for Southwest High School of Macon, Georgia
