= List of killings by law enforcement officers in the United States, July 2011 =

This is a list of people reported killed by non-military law enforcement officers in the United States in July 2011, whether in the line of duty or not, and regardless of reason or method. The listing documents the occurrence of a death, making no implications regarding wrongdoing or justification on the part of the person killed or officer involved. Killings are arranged by date of the incident that caused death. Different death dates, if known, are noted in the description. The table below lists 23 people.

== July 2011 ==
Date	Name (Age) of Deceased	State (city)	Description
2011-07-26	Leskinen, Daniel	Colorado (Black Forest)	Shot after firing at sheriff's deputies. Officers were responding to a report of domestic disturbance involving a gun.
2011-07-24	Redick, Larry	Tennessee (Memphis)	Shot after firing at police who were responding to reports of a domestic disturbance.
2011-07-23	Contreras, Juan	Colorado (Aurora)	Shot after punching plainclothes officer several times and reaching for knife. Officer was investigating an extortion charge where a man had demanded $50 for return of stolen car keys.
2011-07-22	Alfred, Leon	Georgia (Douglas County)	Shot after refusing to drop knife. Police arrived after Alfred had stabbed another man to death.
2011-07-21	Leon, Ricardo	Virginia (Centreville)	Shot after refusing to drop shotgun and approaching officers. Police were responding to report of a domestic disturbance.
2011-07-21	Waters, Jedidiah J.	Washington (Federal Way)	Shot while reaching for handgun while being chased by police. Officers were responding to report of man shoplifting in store.
2011-07-21	Jenkins, Michael (30)	Florida (Orlando)	
2011-07-21	Woolfson, Jonathan (37)	Florida (North Miami Beach)	
2011-07-20	Moon, Eric Dewayne Jr	Georgia (Marietta)	Shot after posing a threat to officers. Police had attempted to stop the vehicle Moon was driving. Moon fled at high speed, crashed his vehicle and fled on foot into an apartment complex.
2011-07-18	Ashley, Alonzo	Colorado (Denver)	Died of "Physiologic stresses involved in subduing and restraining the decedent". Police were responding to reports of a domestic violence incident at the Denver Zoo.
2011-07-17	Husband, Niko	Illinois (Chicago)	Shot after struggle with police and reaching for gun in waistband. Police were responding to report of man with gun outside bar.
2011-07-16	Hawkins, Lynell	Illinois (Chicago)	Shot after shooting at police. Police were pursuing suspect after reports of gunshots in the area.
2011-07-16	Gaswint, Justin	Washington (Lynnwood)	Shot after charging deputy and threatening to kill him. The deputy had stopped on an overpass to talk to a pedestrian. As the deputy exited his vehicle Gaswint attacked and the two fought.
2011-07-16	Harding, Kenneth (19)	California (San Francisco)	Harding shot after shooting at police who were attempting to cite Harding for light-rail fare evasion.
2011-07-15	unnamed male	Georgia (Avondale)	Shot during struggle with officer when officer thought man was reaching for a gun. The officer was responding to a report of a man acting strangely. The man ran from the officer into the woods were the struggle ensued. The unnamed male's .38 caliber handgun was located at the scene.
2011-07-14	Olivas, Rafael Alonso	Nevada(Las Vegas)	Officers were responding to a report of a "man acting erratically" and found Olivas walking down a street with a knife. After Olivas refused to drop the knife and continued advancing toward officers despite being shot with beanbags, officers shot the man to death.
2011-07-12	Ferrera, Umberto (74)	Florida (Tampa)	
2011-07-11	Pearce, John	Georgia (Gainesville)	Shot after charging at deputies. Officer were responding to a report of a man attacking two women, one of whom died, at the Harbour Point Yacht Club subdivision. When the officers arrived Pearce was walking outside the home naked and covered in blood and described his demeanor as "deranged."
2011-07-10	Brown, Brandon Ray	Washington (Bothell)	Shot while advancing on deputy while holding a cane overhead. Deputies were responding to a report of a domestic disturbance.
2011-07-10	Turner, David Lee	California (Bakersfield)	Shot after striking deputy in back of the head with bag containing two 24-ounce cans of beer. Turner was being questioned regarding the purchase of alcohol for minors at a store. After initially complying with officers an altercation ensued when Turner attempted to leave.
2011-07-09	Thomas, Kelly	California (Fullerton)	Died from blunt force injuries after an altercation with police. Two police officers, Manuel Ramos and Jay Cicinelli, were charged with second-degree murder but were later acquitted. Charges of excessive force and involuntary manslaughter against a third officer, Joseph Wolfe, were dropped after the acquittals of the other two officers.
2011-07-05	Noble, James (70)	Florida (Vero Beach)	
2011-07-04	Silva, Luis	Nevada (Las Vegas)	Shot to death by officers after allegedly pointing a gun at them. Police had responded to the home to find Silva with a gun to his head.

== See also ==
- Death in custody § United States
- Henry A. Wallace Police Crime Public Database
- List of cases of police brutality
- List of countries with annual rates and counts for killings by law enforcement officers
- List of law enforcement officers killed in the line of duty in the United States
- List of law enforcement officers convicted for an on-duty killing in the United States
- List of shootings by US immigration agents
- List of police reforms related to the George Floyd protests
- List of unarmed African Americans killed by law enforcement officers in the United States
- Lists of killings by law enforcement officers
- Police brutality in the United States
- Police misconduct § United States
- Police riot § United States
- Police use of deadly force in the United States
