= WKXQ =

WKXQ may refer to:

- WKXQ (FM), a radio station (92.5 FM) licensed to Rushville, Illinois, United States
- WRNC (North Carolina), a defunct radio station (1600 AM) formerly licensed to Reidsville, North Carolina, United States, that used the WKXQ call letters between 1979 and 1982
