= WFRC =

WFRC may refer to:

- World Fellowship of Reformed Churches, which became part of World Reformed Fellowship
- WLGA (FM), a radio station (90.5 FM) licensed to Columbus, Georgia, United States, which held the call sign WFRC from 1984 to 2019
- WRNC (North Carolina), a defunct radio station (1600 AM) in Reidsville, North Carolina, United States, which held the call sign WFRC from 1947 to 1979
