= WQBZ =

- Fort Valley, Georgia; United States
- Broadcast area: Macon, Georgia
- Frequency: 106.3 MHz (HD Radio)
- Branding: Q 106.3

Programming
- Format: Mainstream rock

Ownership
- Owner: iHeartMedia, Inc.; (iHM Licenses, LLC)
- Sister stations: WIBB-FM, WIHB, WIHB-FM, WRBV, WMGE

History
- First air date: April 6, 1981

Technical information
- Licensing authority: FCC
- Facility ID: 64641
- Class: C2
- ERP: 50,000 watts
- HAAT: 150 meters (490 ft)
- Transmitter coordinates: 32°45′31.00″N 83°44′49.00″W

Links
- Public license information: Public file; LMS
- Webcast: Listen Live
- Website: q106.iheart.com

WQBZ (106.3 FM) is a radio station broadcasting a mainstream rock format. Licensed to Fort Valley, Georgia, United States, the station serves the Macon area. The station is currently owned by iHeartMedia, Inc. and licensed to iHM Licenses, LLC.

== History ==
WQBZ-FM signed on the air on April 6, 1981, and it broadcast a Top 40 format under the branding "Z106". WQBZ is Macon's affiliate for Rick Dees Weekly Top 40 and Dan Ingram's Top 40 Satellite Survey. The format lasted until 1988 when the station flipped to classic rock under the branding "Q106". It switched to its current mainstream rock format by the mid-to-late 1990s. It became Q106.3 in 2013.
