= WIBB-FM =

Coordinates: 32.570°N 83.757°W

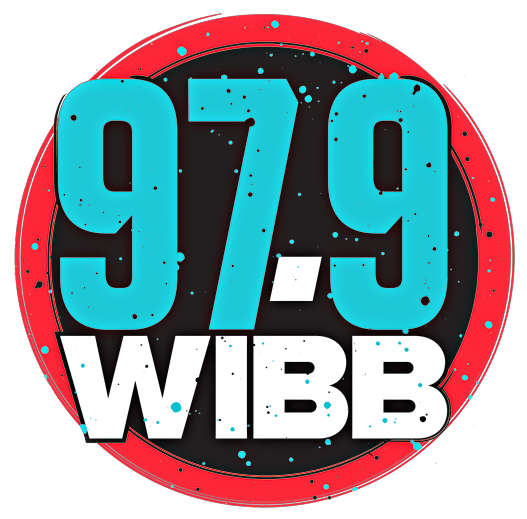
- Fort Valley, Georgia; United States
- Broadcast area: Macon, Georgia
- Frequency: 97.9 MHz
- Branding: 97.9 WIBB

Programming
- Format: Mainstream urban
- Affiliations: Premiere Networks

Ownership
- Owner: iHeartMedia, Inc.; (iHM Licenses, LLC)
- Sister stations: WIHB, WIHB-FM, WQBZ, WRBV, WMGE,

History
- Call sign meaning: BIBB County, where Macon is located

Technical information
- Licensing authority: FCC
- Facility ID: 64652
- Class: C3
- ERP: 10,500 watts
- HAAT: 152 meters

Links
- Public license information: Public file; LMS
- Webcast: Listen Live
- Website: wibb.iheart.com

WIBB-FM (97.9 MHz) is a radio station serving the Macon, Georgia, USA, area with a mainstream urban format. This station is under the ownership of iHeartMedia, Inc.

== Notable DJ ==
- Rob Redding
