= Sofkee, Georgia =

Unincorporated community in Georgia, U.S.

Coordinates: 32°43′28″N 83°39′12″W

Sofkee is an unincorporated community in Bibb County, Georgia, United States. It is part of the Macon Metropolitan Statistical Area. The main road through Sofkee is US 129/SR 247 (Hawkinsville Road).

== History ==
A post office called Sofkee was established in 1912, and remained in operation until 1930. The community derives its name from Tobesofkee Creek.
