= Warner Robins metropolitan area =

- Metropolitan statistical area
- Warner Robins, GA metropolitan statistical area
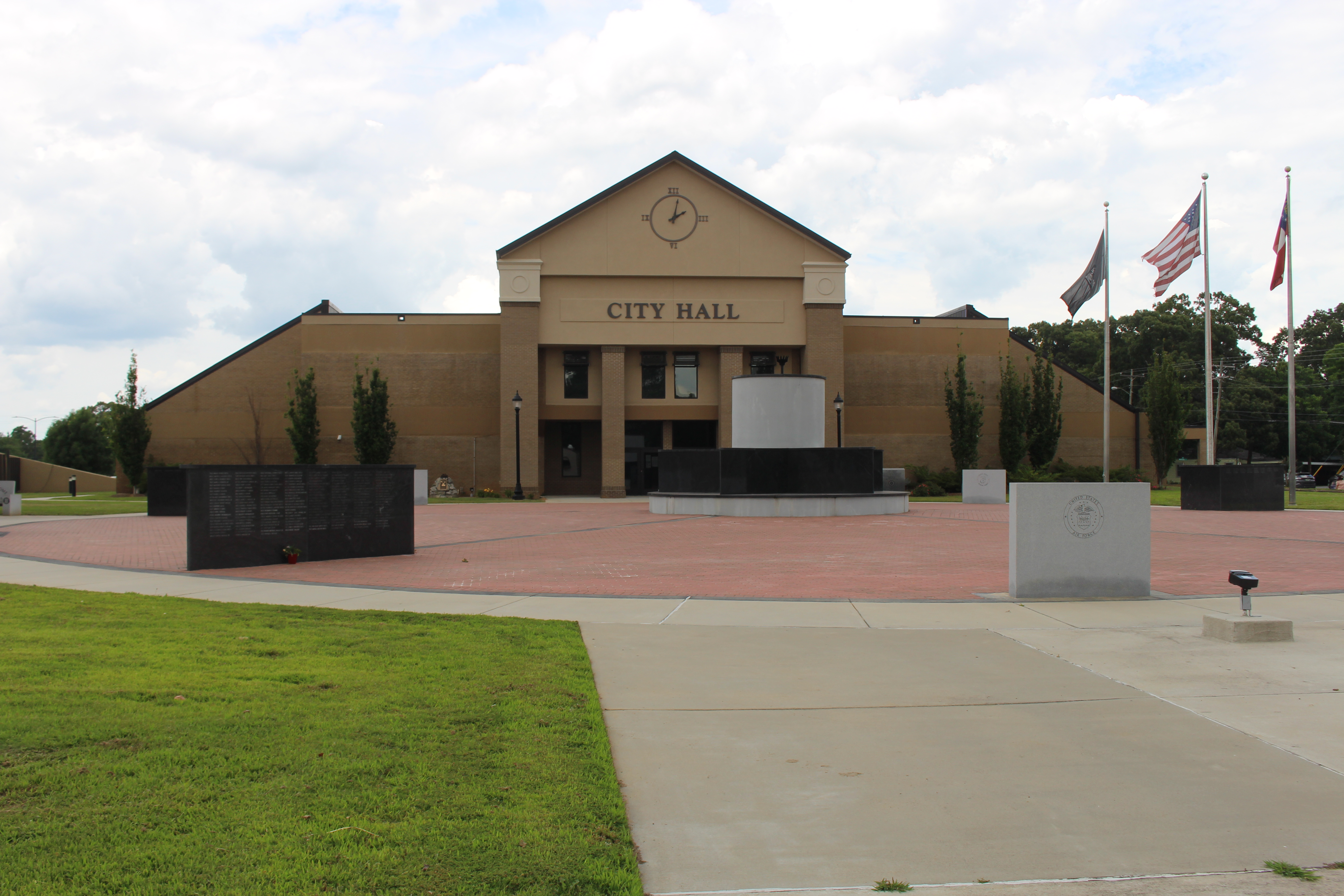
- Warner Robins City Hall
Macon-Bibb County–Warner Robins, GA CSA
City of Warner Robins
Warner Robins, GA MSA
Macon-Bibb County, GA MSA
- Country: United States
- State: Georgia
- Largest city: Warner Robins
- Other cities: List: Byron; Centerville; Fort Valley; Perry

Area
  - Total: 533 sq mi (1,380 km^{2})

Population (2020)
  - Total: 191,614
  - Rank: 225th in the U.S.
  - Density: 360/sq mi (139/km^{2})
- Time zone: UTC−5 (EST)
  - Summer (DST): UTC−4 (EDT)

The Warner Robins metropolitan area is a metropolitan statistical area located in Central Georgia. The Warner Robins MSA is a component of the larger Macon-Warner Robins-Fort Valley combined statistical area. As of 2020, its population was 191,614.

== Geography ==
According to the U.S. Census Bureau, the MSA includes Houston and Peach counties in Central Georgia. In addition to the principal city of Warner Robins, the MSA also includes the incorporated municipalities of Centerville and Perry in Houston County along with Byron and Fort Valley in Peach County. From 2013 to 2018, the MSA also included Hawkinsville and Pulaski County.

== Demographics ==
According to the 2010 U.S. census, the MSA's total population (using the current boundaries) was 167,595; as of July 1, 2019, the total population of the MSA was estimated to be 185,409. By the 2020 census, the Warner Robins metropolitan area had a population of 191,614; in 2022, it had a census-estimated population of 198,193.

According to the 2022 American Community Survey, the MSA's racial and ethnic composition was 51% White, 33% Black or African American, 3% Asian, 1% other, 5% two or more races, and 7% Hispanic and Latino American of any race. Among its population, the median age was 37.3.

The Warner Robins metropolitan area had a median household income of $70,565 with a per capita income of $34,584 in 2022. An estimated 36% earned less than $50,000 annually; 31% between $50-100,000 annually; 27% $100-200,000 annually; and 7% over $200,000 annually. Among the population, approximately 10.8% of the metropolitan area lived at or below the poverty line.
