= WRBV =

Radio station in Macon, Georgia, US

Coordinates: 32.639°N 83.642°W

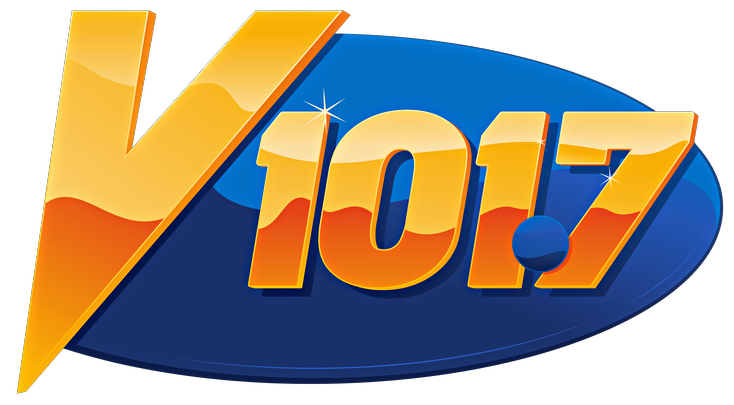
- Warner Robins, Georgia; United States
- Broadcast area: Macon and Vicinity
- Frequency: 101.7 MHz
- Branding: V-101.7

Programming
- Format: Urban adult contemporary
- Affiliations: Premiere Networks; WGXA

Ownership
- Owner: iHeartMedia, Inc.; (iHM Licenses, LLC)
- Sister stations: WIBB-FM, WIHB, WIHB-FM, WMGE, WQBZ

History
- Former call signs: WRBN-FM (1978–1988); WPPR (1988–1991); WRCC-FM (1991–1995); WRBG (1995–1997)
- Call sign meaning: Dual meaning: Rhythm and Blues Variety; Warner RoBins Voice

Technical information
- Licensing authority: FCC
- Facility ID: 65043
- Class: A
- ERP: 4,900 watts
- HAAT: 108 meters (354 ft)

Links
- Public license information: Public file; LMS
- Webcast: Listen Live
- Website: v1017.iheart.com

WRBV (101.7 FM, "V101.7") is a radio station serving the Macon, Georgia area with an urban adult contemporary format. This station is under ownership of iHeartMedia, Inc.
