= Franklinton, Georgia =

Unincorporated community in Georgia, U.S.

- Unincorporated community
- Location within the state of Georgia Franklinton (the United States)
- Coordinates: 32°48′16″N 83°32′08″W
- Country: United States
- State: Georgia
- County: Bibb
- Elevation: 338 ft (103 m)
- Time zone: UTC-5 (Eastern (EST))
  - Summer (DST): UTC-4 (EDT)
- ZIP codes: 31217
- Area code: 478
- GNIS feature ID: 331768

Franklinton is an unincorporated community in Bibb County, Georgia, United States. It is part of the Macon Metropolitan Statistical Area.
