= WMGE (AM) =

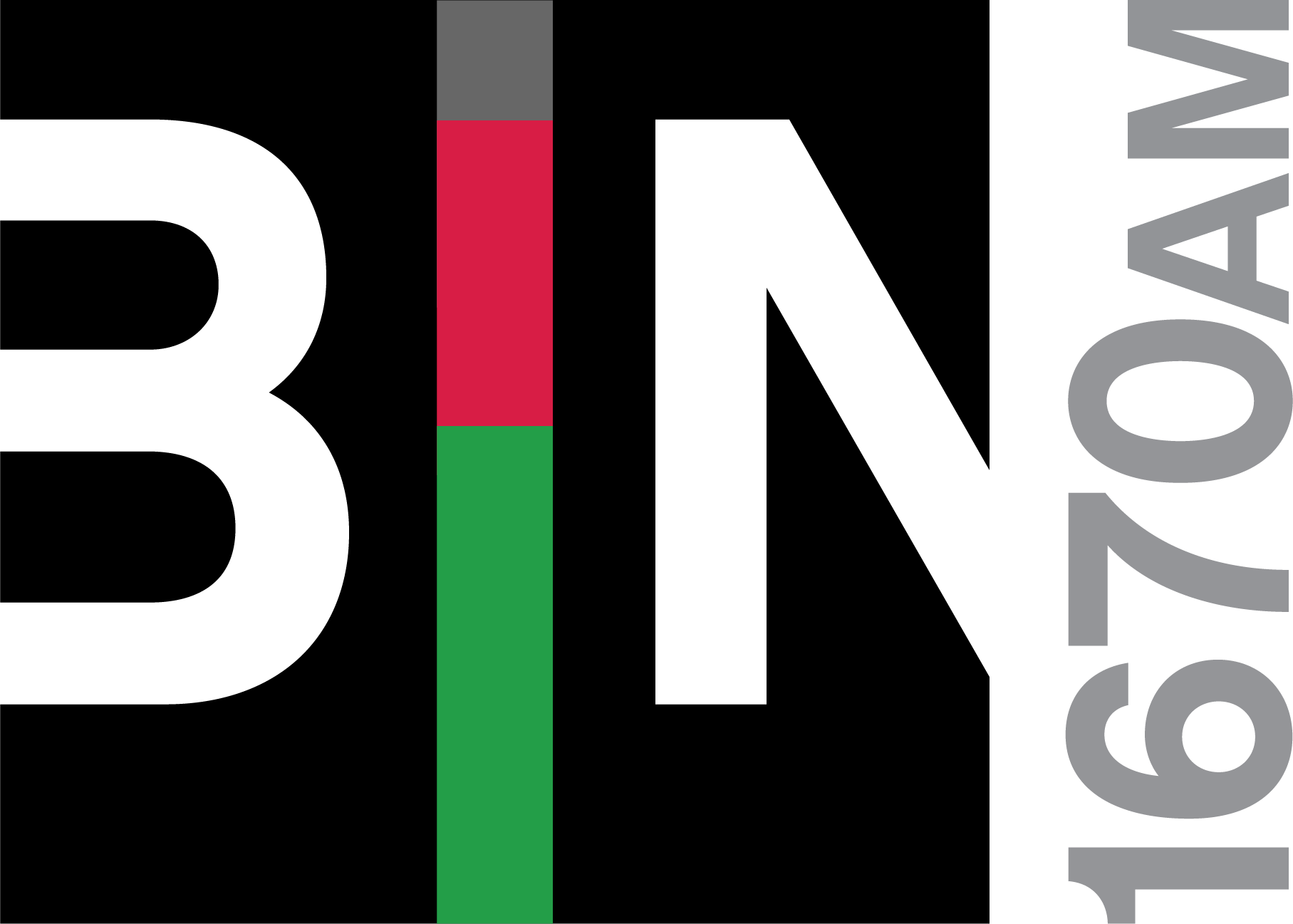
- Dry Branch, Georgia; United States
- Broadcast area: Macon metropolitan area
- Frequency: 1670 kHz
- Branding: Macon's BIN 1670

Programming
- Language: English
- Format: All-news radio
- Network: Black Information Network

Ownership
- Owner: iHeartMedia; (iHM Licenses, LLC)
- Sister stations: WIBB-FM; WIHB; WIHB-FM; WQBZ; WRBV

History
- First air date: May 4, 1998
- Former call signs: WAXP (1998); WNML (1998–1999); WRNC (1999–2003); WMWR (2003–2006); WVVM (2006–2009); WFSM (2009–2010); WPLA (2010–2016)

Technical information
- Licensing authority: FCC
- Facility ID: 87110
- Class: B
- Power: 10,000 watts (day); 1,000 watts (night)
- Transmitter coordinates: 32°48′16″N 83°36′16″W

Links
- Public license information: Public file; LMS
- Webcast: Listen live (via iHeartRadio)
- Website: macon.binnews.com

WMGE (1670 kHz) is an AM radio station broadcasting an African American-oriented all-news radio format from the Black Information Network. Licensed to Dry Branch, Georgia, the station serves the Macon metropolitan area during the day and the southeast United States at night. The station is owned by iHeartMedia.

== History ==
WMGE originated as the expanded band "twin" of an existing station on the standard AM band.

In 1967, a new station in Warner Robins began broadcasting as WRBN on 1600 kHz. On March 17, 1997, the Federal Communications Commission (FCC) announced that 88 stations had been given permission to move to newly available "Expanded Band" transmitting frequencies, ranging from 1610 to 1700 kHz, with now-WRCC authorized to move from 1600 to 1670 kHz.

A construction permit for the expanded band station was assigned the call sign WAXP on March 6, 1998. An FCC policy stated that both the original station and its expanded band counterpart could operate simultaneously for up to five years, after which owners would have to turn in one of the two licenses, depending on whether they preferred the new assignment or elected to remain on the original frequency. It was ultimately decided to transfer full operations to the expanded band station, so on January 10, 2002, the license for the original station at 1600 AM, at this point holding the call sign WAXP, was cancelled.

The call letters for the new expanded band station on 1670 AM were changed from WAXP to WNML on May 4, 1998, to WRNC on March 1, 1999, to WMWR on November 17, 2003, to WVVM on February 21, 2006, to WFSM on March 2, 2009, to WPLA on October 14, 2010, and to WMGE on December 14, 2016.

On June 29, 2020, 15 iHeart stations in markets with large African American populations, including WMGE, began stunting with African American speeches, interspersed with messages such as "Our Voices Will Be Heard" and "Our side of the story is about to be told," with a new format slated to launch on June 30. That day, WMGE, along with the other 14 stations, became the launch stations for the Black Information Network, an African American-oriented all-news radio network. Prior to the change, WMGE was a Fox Sports Radio affiliate.

== Previous logo ==
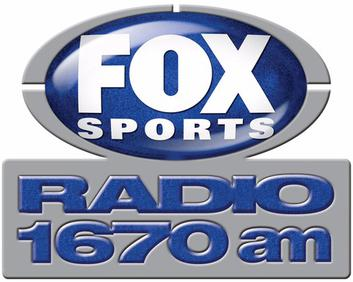

Logo as a Fox Sports Radio affiliate
