= Tobesofkee Creek =

Coordinates: 32.71986°N 83.60213°W

Location
- Country: United States

Physical characteristics
- Source
  - location: Georgia

Tobesofkee Creek is a 58.9-mile-long (94.8 km) river in Georgia. It originates near Barnesville and flows roughly southeast across Lamar, Monroe, and Bibb counties to join the Ocmulgee River south of the city of Macon. A dam on this stream forms Lake Tobesofkee.

== History ==
After 1670 the Lower Creek Trading Path, which linked Creek towns on the Chattahoochee River to the English colonial town of Charlestown, crossed Tobesofkee Creek. The river has been called by several names in the Muskogee language, spoken by Creek Indians. The earliest recorded name is Togosohatchee. In 1776 William Bartram recorded the river's name as Tobosochte.

The meaning of the name Tobesofkee is unclear, although it appears to contain the word sofkee, a hominy dish that is considered the forerunner of grits. The name was first recorded in the 1790s by Benjamin Hawkins, the United States agent to the Creek Indians, who spelled it variously as Tobosaufkee, Tobe saufe ke, and Tobesauke.

In his 1905 study of U.S. place names, Henry Gannett derived the stream's name (which he spelled "Tobesofka") from the supposed fact that "an Indian lost a dish of meal while crossing it." William A. Read later translated the name as meaning "sofkee stirrer," from atapa (tool for stirring) and safki (corn gruel). Historian John Goff criticized Gannett's interpretation as "open to doubt" and concluded that, with the available historical sources, "it would be mere speculation to attempt to translate Tobesofkee."

Between 1963 and 1967 the U.S. Soil Conservation Service and the Bibb County Commission built a series of dams on Tobesofkee Creek to form flood control reservoirs, including Lake Tobesofkee and "Little Lake Tobosofkee." The Lake Tobesofkee Recreation Area opened in 1969, and private developers built and sold lakefront houses over the following decades. By the turn of the 21st century Lake Tobesofkee was considered one of the most heavily fished lakes in Georgia.

== See also ==
- List of rivers of Georgia
