= Payne, Georgia =

- Neighborhood
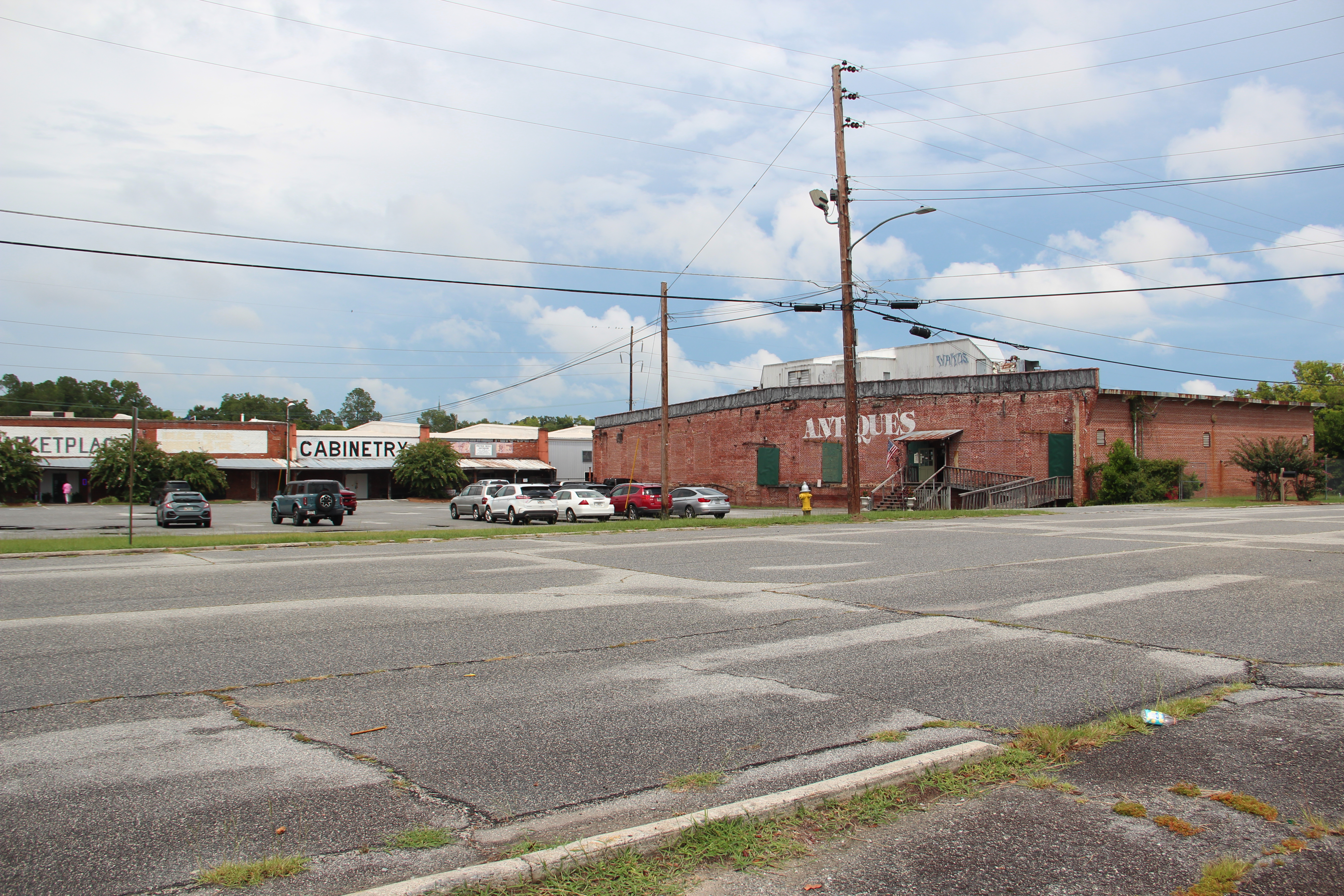
- Payne Mill Antique Mall, 2024

- Location in Bibb County and the state of Georgia
- Coordinates: 32°51′7″N 83°40′45″W
- Country: United States
- State: Georgia
- County: Bibb

Area
  - Total: 0.039 sq mi (0.1 km^{2})
  - Land: 0.039 sq mi (0.1 km^{2})
  - Water: 0 sq mi (0 km^{2})
- Elevation: 515 ft (157 m)

Population (2010)
  - Total: 218
  - Density: 5,080/sq mi (1,961.5/km^{2})
- Time zone: UTC-5 (Eastern (EST))
  - Summer (DST): UTC-4 (EDT)
- FIPS code: 13-59584
- GNIS feature ID: 0320294

Payne, more commonly known as Payne City, was a city in Bibb County, Georgia, United States. Payne was an enclave completely surrounded by the city of Macon, and was the only other incorporated area in the county. The population was 218 at the 2010 census.

The community was named after William Sims Payne, proprietor of a local mill. Though the mill is closed today, its former site houses several small businesses. Payne was located near Macon's Vineville neighborhood and business district, and the city was closely associated with Freedom Park, an adjacent county recreation area. Payne was part of the Macon Metropolitan Statistical Area.

The city was originally expected to be dissolved when Macon and Bibb County completed their consolidation on January 1, 2014. However, the dissolution was put on hold by the state legislature in early 2013, due to the 9–7 vote against consolidation within Payne itself. On March 27, 2015, a law passed by the Georgia General Assembly was signed by the governor that abolished the city.

== Geography ==
According to the United States Census Bureau, the city had a total area of 0.04 square miles (0.1 km^{2}), all land.

== Demographics ==
Historical population
Census	Pop.	Note	%±
1930	426		—
1940	535		25.6%
1950	520		−2.8%
1960	346		−33.5%
1970	236		−31.8%
1980	196		−16.9%
1990	192		−2.0%
2000	178		−7.3%
2010	218		22.5%
U.S. Decennial Census; 1850-1870 1870-1880; 1890-1910 1920-1930; 1940 1950 1960; 1970 1980 1990; 2000 2010

Payne last appeared in the 2010 U.S. census after being dissolved in 2015.

Payne, Georgia – Racial and ethnic composition Note: the US Census treats Hispanic/Latino as an ethnic category. This table excludes Latinos from the racial categories and assigns them to a separate category. Hispanics/Latinos may be of any race.
Race / Ethnicity (NH = Non-Hispanic)	Pop 2000	Pop 2010	% 2000	% 2010
White alone (NH)	152	70	85.39%	32.11%
Black or African American alone (NH)	24	142	13.48%	65.14%
Native American or Alaska Native alone (NH)	0	0	0.00%	0.00%
Asian alone (NH)	0	0	0.00%	0.00%
Native Hawaiian or Pacific Islander alone (NH)	0	0	0.00%	0.00%
Other race alone (NH)	1	0	0.56%	0.00%
Mixed race or Multiracial (NH)	1	3	0.56%	1.38%
Hispanic or Latino (any race)	0	3	0.00%	1.38%
Total	178	218	100.00%	100.00%

=== 2000 census ===
As of the census of 2000, there were 178 people, 84 households, and 39 families residing in the city. The population density was 4,552.5 inhabitants per square mile (1,757.7/km^{2}). There were 90 housing units at an average density of 2,301.8 per square mile (888.7/km^{2}). The racial makeup of the city was 67.3% African American, 28.3% White, 0.56% from other races, and 0.56% from two or more races.

There were 84 households, out of which 23.8% had children under the age of 18 living with them, 20.2% were married couples living together, 22.6% had a female householder with no husband present, and 52.4% were non-families. 47.6% of all households were made up of individuals, and 21.4% had someone living alone who was 65 years of age or older. The average household size was 2.12 and the average family size was 3.10.

In the city, the population was spread out, with 27.0% under the age of 18, 7.9% from 18 to 24, 32.6% from 25 to 44, 14.6% from 45 to 64, and 18.0% who were 65 years of age or older. The median age was 35 years. For every 100 females, there were 83.5 males. For every 100 females age 18 and over, there were 80.6 males.

The median income for a household in the city was $20,313, and the median income for a family was $28,333. Males had a median income of $25,000 versus $19,375 for females. The per capita income for the city was $15,109. About 8.8% of families and 12.7% of the population were below the poverty line, including 14.0% of those under the age of eighteen and 15.4% of those 65 or over.

== Education ==
When the municipal government existed, it was in the Bibb County School District, which as of 2020 covers all of Macon-Bibb County.
