= WIHB-FM =

- Gray, Georgia; United States
- Broadcast area: Macon metropolitan area
- Frequency: 96.5 MHz
- Branding: 96.5 The Bull

Programming
- Format: Country
- Affiliations: Premiere Networks

Ownership
- Owner: iHeartMedia, Inc.; (iHM Licenses, LLC)
- Sister stations: WIHB, WIBB-FM, WQBZ, WRBV, WMGE

History
- First air date: 1995 (as WWIQ)
- Former call signs: WWIQ (1992–1997); WNML-FM (1997–1998); WIBD (1998–1999); WRNC-FM (1999–2001); WJZY-FM (2001–2002); WYNF (2002–2006); WPCH (2006–2015)
- Call sign meaning: Sister station to WIHB

Technical information
- Licensing authority: FCC
- Facility ID: 29128
- Class: C3
- ERP: 8,000 watts
- HAAT: 174 m (571 ft)
- Transmitter coordinates: 32°58′31″N 83°47′59″W

Links
- Public license information: Public file; LMS
- Webcast: Listen Live
- Website: 965thebull.iheart.com

WIHB-FM (96.5 MHz, "96.5 The Bull") is a radio station serving the Macon metropolitan area in central Georgia, and having Gray, Georgia as its city of license. The station is owned by iHeartMedia, Inc. It airs a country music format.

== History ==
This station was assigned the WPCH call letters by the Federal Communications Commission on November 1, 2006. It was previously used on "Peach 94.9", a station which had a very similar radio format in metro Atlanta, the next media market to the north. That station is now WUBL, "94.9 The Bull".

The call letters actually go back to an AM station in New York City. In the early 1930s, WPCH operated on 570 kHz in the New York metropolitan area.

During the week of March 17, 2008, fans of classic hits station "Peach 96.5" were told that they could listen to the station online until the station returned to the air as "Peach 102.5" on March 24, 2008. During this transition, the country format known as "The Bull" broadcast on both the 102.5 and 96.5 frequencies. In late 2008, the classic hits format returned as a simulcast on both 96.5 and 102.5 FM.

On March 22, 2011, 102.5 broke away from the 96.5 simulcast and now plays country music. Peach 96.5 FM still carries the classic hits format as well as online.

Logo as Peach 96.5

On September 19, 2011, WPCH shifted their format from classic hits to adult contemporary, keeping the "Peach 96.5" branding.

On February 23, 2013, at 12 midnight, WPCH changed their format back to country, branded as "New Country 96.5".

On June 1, 2015, at 6 AM, WPCH rebranded back to the "96.5 The Bull" branding. The new callsign WIHB-FM was adopted at the same time.
