= Walden, Georgia =

Unincorporated community in Georgia, U.S.

Coordinates: 32°42′30″N 83°39′56″W

Walden is an unincorporated community in Bibb County, Georgia, United States. It is part of the Macon Metropolitan Statistical Area.

== History ==
A post office called Walden was established in 1878 and remained in operation until 1954. The name may be borrowed from Walden, a book by Henry David Thoreau.
