= WIHB (AM) =

- Macon, Georgia; United States
- Frequency: 1280 kHz
- Branding: 97.3 and 103.3 The Bull Icons

Programming
- Format: Classic country

Ownership
- Owner: iHeartMedia, Inc.; (iHM Licenses, LLC)
- Sister stations: WIBB-FM, WIHB-FM, WQBZ, WRBV, WMGE

History
- First air date: November 14, 1948 (as WIBB)
- Former call signs: WIBB (1948–1993); WKXK (1993–1994); WIBB (1994–1995); WQTK (1995–1997); WLCG (1997–2008); WIBB (2008–2015)
- Call sign meaning: Sister station to WIHB-FM

Technical information
- Licensing authority: FCC
- Facility ID: 41989
- Class: D
- Power: 5,000 watts (day); 99 watts (night)
- Transmitter coordinates: 32°48′16″N 83°36′16″W
- Translators: 97.3 W247BW (Macon); 103.3 W277CL (Sofkee)

Links
- Public license information: Public file; LMS
- Webcast: Listen Live
- Website: 973thebullicons.iheart.com

WIHB (1280 AM) is a radio station licensed to Macon, Georgia, United States. The station is currently owned by iHeartMedia, Inc. (formerly Clear Channel Communications) and licensed to iHM Licenses, LLC.

== History ==
The station went on the air as WIBB on November 14, 1948. On March 1, 1993, the call sign was changed to WKXK but was changed back to WIBB on November 29, 1994. Then on December 8, 1995, the call sign was changed to WQTK and then on March 31, 1997, to WLCG. On January 17, 2008, the call sign was changed back to WIBB for the third time. The station had been broadcasting a Rhythmic oldies format until it changed to a Talk radio format on October 13, 2008, and then it later on took on a gospel format with the "Halleluah" branding, followed by comedy as "Comedy 1280" and Spanish adult hits as "La Preciosa 1280". On June 1, 2015, it took on a classic country format as "97.3 The Bull Icons" (simulcast on FM translator W247BW 97.3 FM Macon); coincident with the format change, the station's call sign was changed to WIHB.
