= Central Georgia =

Area containing the metropolitan region surrounding the city of Macon

Coordinates: 33°45′N 84°20′W

Central Georgia Middle Georgia
- Region
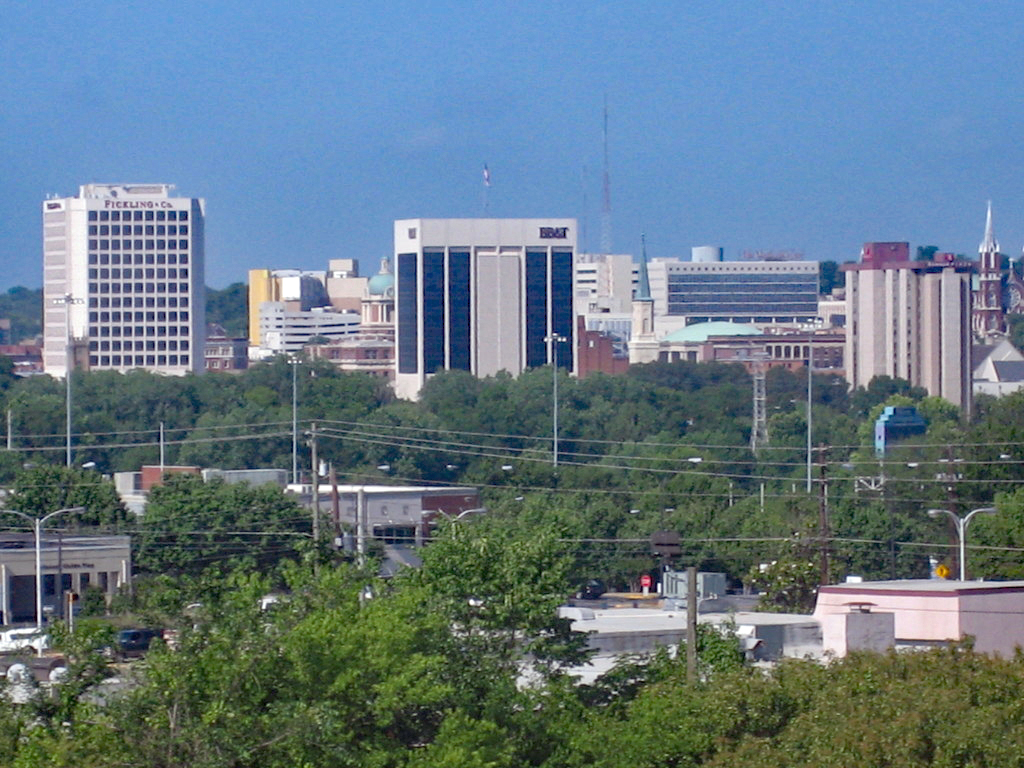
- Downtown Macon

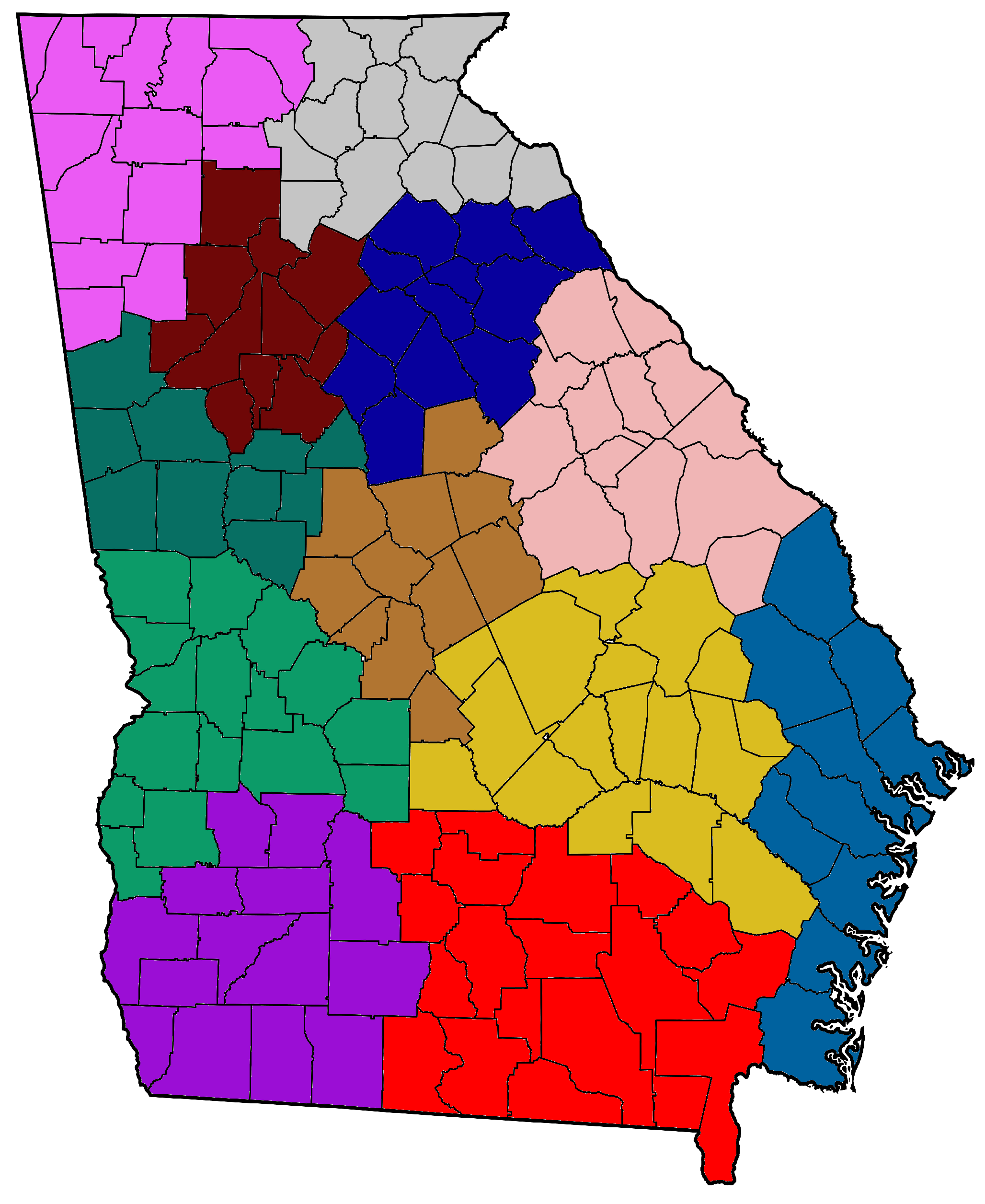
- Central Georgia highlighted in brown

- Location of Georgia within the United States
- Country: United States
- State: Georgia
- Largest city: Macon

Population (2020)
  - Total: 872,892
- Demonym(s): Central Georgian; Middle Georgian
- Website: georgia.org/regions/middle-georgia

Central Georgia, also known as Middle Georgia, is an eleven-county region in the U.S. state of Georgia. It abuts Metro Atlanta, just to the north, and is anchored by both the Macon and Warner Robins metropolitan areas.

== Geography ==
According to the Georgia Department of Economic Development, the region consists of the following counties: Baldwin, Bibb, Crawford, Houston, Jones, Monroe, Peach, Pulaski, Putnam, Twiggs, and Wilkinson.

== Demographics ==
In 2010, the estimated total population of central Georgia, including the counties of Baldwin, Bibb, Crawford, Houston, Jones, Monroe, Peach, and Twiggs counties, was 445,608 people. The population has grown by 11% over the last 10 years. The fastest growth was reported in Houston County, which saw a population growth of 26.3% followed by Monroe (21.5%) and Jones (21.3%) counties. The racial make-up of the region as of 2010 was 55.9% non-Hispanic white, 38.7% African American and 1.6% Asian, with about 1.8% identified as mixed or two more races. Houston County had the highest educational attainment for bachelor's degrees (14.5%) and graduate or professional degrees (11.2%) for the population over 25 years old in the Central Georgia region in 2011. By the 2020 U.S. census, the counties forming Central Georgia had a total resident population of 509,994.

Forming part of the Bible Belt, Central or Middle Georgia is predominantly Christian, since the colonial era. According to the Association of Religion Data Archives in 2020, the majority of the region is Baptist, non-denominational, Methodist, and Catholic. The largest Christian denominations were the Southern Baptist Convention, United Methodist Church, Catholic Church, National Baptist Convention USA, African Methodist Episcopal Church, National Missionary Baptist Convention of America, and the Christian Methodist Episcopal Church.

The region's largest non-Christian religions were Hinduism, Islam, the Baha'i Faith, Unitarian Universalism, and Judaism. The largest Jewish movements in the region were Conservative Judaism and Reform Judaism.

== Economy ==
The economy in Central Georgia tends to cluster around five areas: aerospace, healthcare and hospitals, kaolin, warehousing and distribution, and heritage and ecotourism. Macon is the region's retail and trade center and the Macon-Bibb county serves as the region's center of employment. The Central Georgia region has been competitive in the United States in terms of economic growth and stability, but within the state of Georgia, the region has not experienced much growth. The region lags behind most other regions in the state in terms of well-being of its residents and overall economic growth. As of 2017, over 46,000 workers from nearby counties commute to the Macon-Bibb county for work. To assist in business growth and development, the Macon Economic Development Commission recruits new businesses and industries to the region. In August 2017, the Canadian based Irving Consumer Products announced plans to build a manufacturing plant in Macon that would create additional jobs.

The Central Georgia Business and Technology Park in Thomaston is a 240-acre facility that houses tenants such as Southern Company, Solutions Pest & Lawn, Criterion Technologies, and Chief Manufacturing.

Houston County is home to Georgia's largest industrial complex at the Warner Robins Air Force Base. Houston county has more than 3,000 acres of land for industrial development and one of the lowest property tax rates in Central Georgia. These factors resulted in it being designated one of Georgia's Entrepreneur Friendly Communities. Houston County has experienced a population growth, from 89,208 in 1990 to a population of 160,000 in 2015.

=== Major employers ===
Central Georgia's largest employer is Robins Air Force Base, with more than 22,300 employees as of 2015, followed by GEICO with over 5,690 employees and the Medical Center of Central Georgia, with over 4,600 employees. Other employers in the region include the Houston County Board of Education, Bibb County Board of Education, Houston Healthcare, Perdue Farms, the Macon-Bibb County Government, the Blue Bird Corporation, Coliseum Health System, and Frito-Lay.

== Education ==
- Middle Georgia State University
- Mercer University
- Central Georgia Technical College
- Wesleyan College
- Georgia Military College
- Georgia College
- Fort Valley State University

== Culture and attractions ==
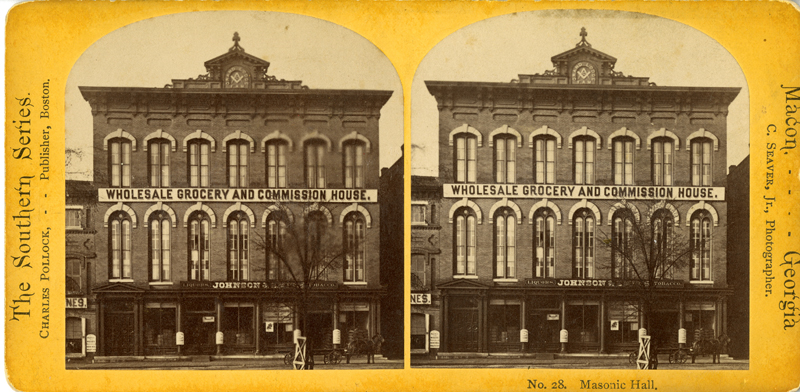
Harmonic Hall, circa 1876 - DPLA

Central Georgia has several cultural attractions that include the Ocmulgee National Monument, Georgia National Fairground, and the Museum of Aviation at Robins Air Force Base. Macon is home to over 10 museums, 5 tours and 7 annual festivals. Some of the museums include the Tubman African American Museum, the Georgia Sports Hall of Fame, and the Museum of Arts & Sciences.

The region has an abundance of nature and wildlife; the High Falls State Park is located just northwest of Macon. High Falls was a prosperous industrial town with several stores, including a mill, a cotton gin and a shoe factory until it fell from prosperity.

=== Notable annual events ===
The region hosts several events each year. Macon hosts over twenty annual events and has been nicknamed the festival capital of Georgia. Macon's popular events include the International Cherry Blossom Festival, the Bragg Jam, the Ocmulgee Indian Celebration. Other popular events include the Georgia Peach Festival which is hosted in Byron and Fort Valley, and the annual miss Georgia Peach pageant hosted in Fort Valley.

== Transportation ==
The region features a regional airport, the Middle Georgia Regional Airport. The region is only hours away from the Port of Savannah, a major U.S. seaport. Major freeways and highways in the region include, Interstate 16, Interstate 75, Interstate 475, US 23, US 41, US 80, US 129, US 341, and US 441.

== Notable people ==
- Clarence Reid, a.k.a. Blowfly - musician and songwriter
- Ed Roberts - Physician and founder of MITS where he created the Altair 8800 microcomputer, starting the microcomputer revolution. It featured Microsoft's first software, the Altair BASIC and employed Bill Gates, Paul Allen, and Monte Davidoff.
- Obie Walker - claimant of the World Colored Heavyweight Championship boxing title in the 1930s
- Fish Scales — Alternative Southern Rap Artist
- Betty Cantrell — Miss America 2016
- Robert Waymouth — Chemistry professor at Stanford University
- Melvyn Douglas — Actor
- Carrie Preston — Actress
- Jack McBrayer — Actor
- Jason Aldean — Country Singer
- Sonny Perdue — Former Governor of Georgia
- Deborah Roberts — ABC News Correspondent
- Joel Godard — Late night show tv announcer
- Richard "Little Richard" Penniman - Singer
- Casey Hayward — NFL football player
- Kareem Jackson --- NFL Football player
- Grey Henson --- Actor
