= Lake Tobesofkee =

Man-made lake in Georgia, United States

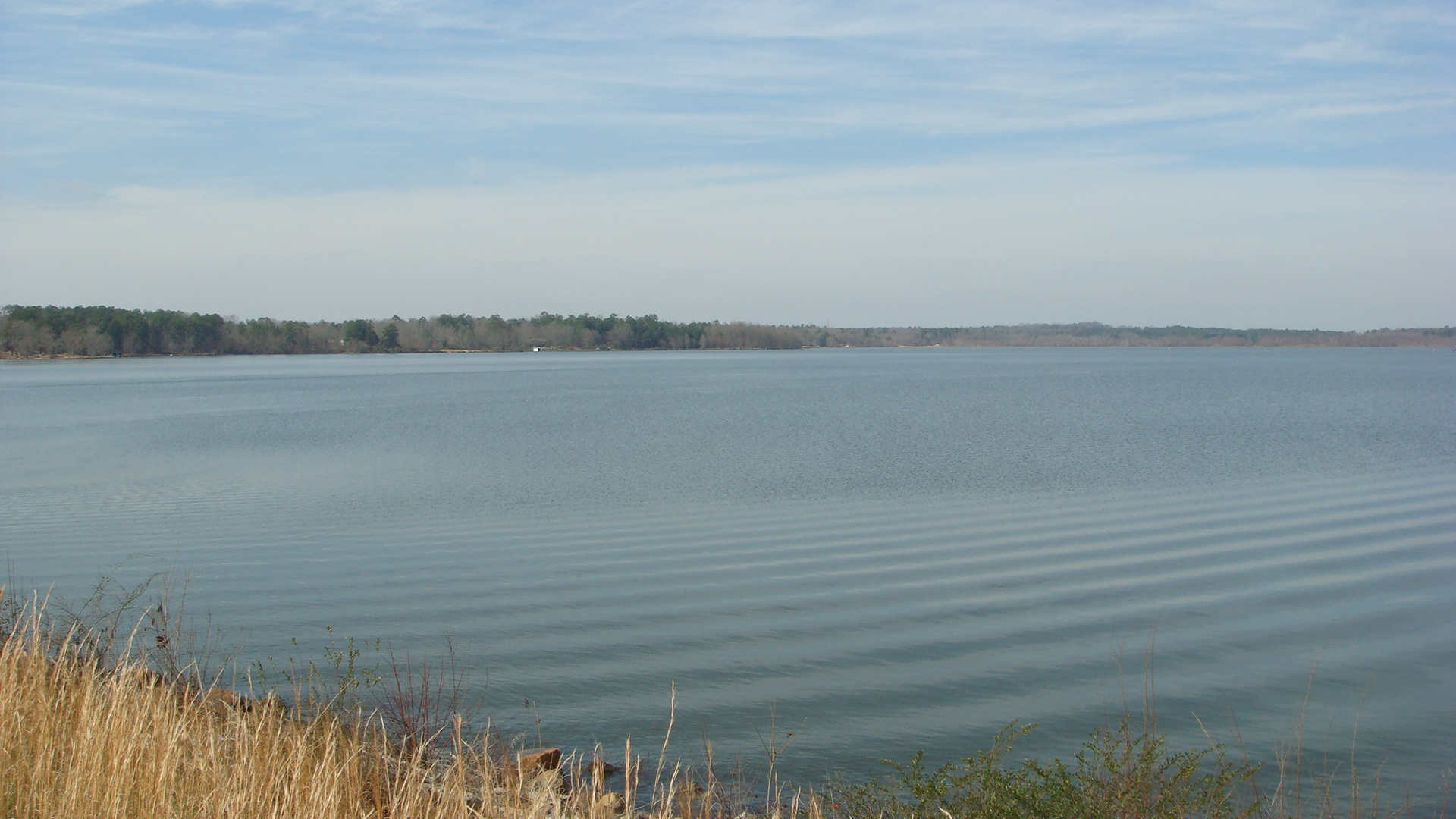
- Lake Tobesofkee in the wintertime

- Location within Georgia Location within the United States
- Location: Bibb County, Georgia
- Coordinates: 32°48′56″N 83°47′55″W
- Type: reservoir
- Primary inflows: Tobesofkee Creek
- Primary outflows: Tobesofkee Creek
- Basin countries: United States
- Managing agency: Macon–Bibb County, Georgia
- Built: December 1964
- First flooded: June 1969
- Max. length: 6 mi (9.7 km)
- Surface area: 1,750 acres (7.1 km^{2})
- Max. depth: 24.5 ft (7.5 m)
- Shore length^{1}: 35 mi (56 km)
- Surface elevation: 361 ft (110 m)
- Website: laketobo.maconbibb.us
- ^{1} Shore length is not a well-defined measure.

Lake Tobesofkee is a reservoir located on Tobesofkee Creek in Bibb County, Georgia. Built in the 1960s to control flooding, the lake soon became a site for public recreation and is known as one of the most heavily fished lakes in the state. Locals often refer to the lake as "Tobo."

== History ==
Between 1963 and 1967 the U.S. Soil Conservation Service and the Bibb County Commission built a series of dams on Tobesofkee Creek to form flood control reservoirs, including Fenley Ryther Dam, which formed Lake Tobesofkee. In 1994, the dam was damaged and nearly overtopped due to flood waters from Tropical Storm Alberto.

== Fenley Ryther Dam ==
Fenley Ryther dam is a 54 ft (16 m) tall earth-fill dam stretching 860 ft (260 m). It utilizes a concrete spillway, with two 40 ft (12 m) steel Tainter gates to control the flow. It was named after a Macon engineer, Fenley Ryther Jr., who approved the final plans in 1964 while working for Dames & Moore Consulting Engineering firm.

The Macon–Bibb County commission has approved funding for dam gate repairs in 2015 and 2024, but it is not documented if the repairs were ever completed. In 2026, the county put out a request for proposals for a new, automated gate system for the dam.

== Recreation ==
Located three miles west of I-475, Lake Tobesofkee Recreation Area has three public parks named Claystone, Sandy Beach, and Arrowhead. All three parks include white sand beaches for swimming and pavilions for gatherings and picnicking. Arrowhead and Claystone parks have spaces for tent and RV camping and facilities for fishing and boating. In addition, Arrowhead Park also includes several miles of singletrack mountain biking trails, which are also approved for hiking. Claystone has a junior disk golf course, and Sandy Beach added four pickleball courts in 2021.

Sandy Beach park opened a new waterpark in 2015 with a water slide, lazy river, and a wave pool. But after mechanical issues in 2022 and disputes over who would pay for the costs of repairs, it was permanently closed in 2023.

In 2024, the county upgraded the RV camping sites from asphalt to concrete pads at both Arrowhead and Claystone parks, and also updated the electrical and water connections. Updates to the docks were also completed, with the whole project costing approximately US$600,000.
