= Avondale, Georgia =

Unincorporated community in Georgia, U.S.

Coordinates: 32°59′07″N 83°52′56″W

Avondale is an unincorporated community in Bibb County, Georgia, United States. It is part of the Macon Metropolitan Statistical Area.

== History ==
The community's name is an allusion to the River Avon, in England.
