= Macon metropolitan area, Georgia =

Macon metropolitan area
- Metropolitan statistical area
- Macon-Bibb County, GA Metropolitan Statistical Area
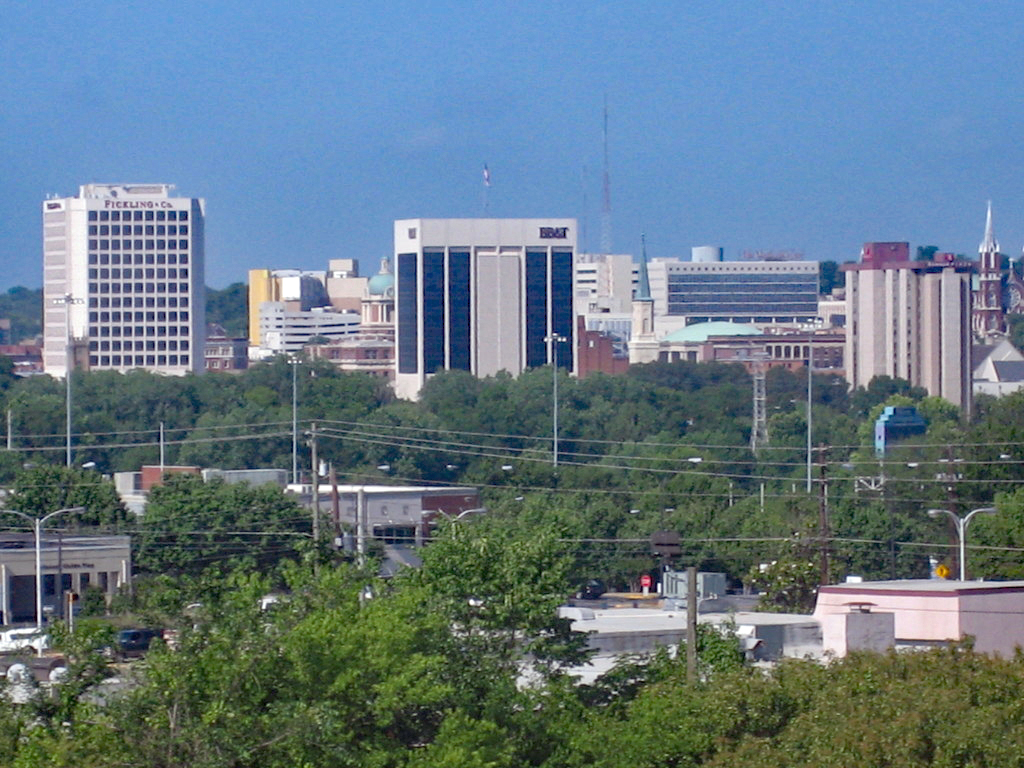
- Downtown Macon
Macon-Bibb County–Warner Robins, GA CSA
Macon-Bibb County
City of Warner Robins
Warner Robins, GA MSA
Macon-Bibb County, GA MSA
- Country: United States
- State: Georgia
- Principal cities: Macon; Warner Robins

Area
  - Total: 1,723.6 sq mi (4,464 km^{2})

Population (2022)
  - Total: 235,805
  - Density: 136.81/sq mi (52.822/km^{2})

GDP
  - Total: $22.572 billion (2022)
- Time zone: UTC−5 (EST)
  - Summer (DST): UTC−4 (EDT)

The Macon metropolitan area is a metropolitan statistical area (MSA) consisting of five counties in Central Georgia, anchored by the principal city of Macon. At the 2020 U.S. census, the five-county area had a population of 233,802. In 2025, its estimated population was 238,553. The MSA is a component of the broader Macon-Bibb County–Warner Robins, GA Combined Statistical Area, which also includes the Warner Robins, GA Metropolitan Statistical Area. The CSA has a total population of 446,644 as of 2025.

== Geography ==
According to the U.S. Census Bureau, the Macon metropolitan area consists of the following counties: Bibb, Crawford, Jones, Monroe, and Twiggs.

=== Communities ===
==== Places with more than 100,000 inhabitants ====
- Macon (consolidated city-county) (principal city)

==== Places with 1,000 to 10,000 inhabitants ====
- Forsyth
- Gray
- Jeffersonville
- Roberta

==== Places with less than 1,000 inhabitants ====
- Allentown (portion within Twiggs County)
- Danville (portion within Twiggs County)
- Culloden

==== Census-designated places ====
- Bolingbroke
- Juliette
- Knoxville
- Musella
- Smarr

==== Unincorporated places ====
- Avondale
- Franklinton
- Haddock
- Lizella
- Payne (formerly incorporated)
- Rutland
- Sofkee
- Walden

== Demographics ==
As of the census of 2000, there were 222,368 people, 84,338 households, and 58,788 families residing within the MSA. The racial makeup of the MSA was 48.26% White, 56.37% African American, 0.21% Native American, 0.85% Asian, 0.02% Pacific Islander, 0.48% from other races, and 0.80% from two or more races. Hispanic or Latino of any race were 1.30% of the population. By 2022, its population was an estimated 235,805. Its racial and ethnic makeup was 47% White, 42% Black, 2% Asian, 1% other, 5% two or more races, and 4% Hispanic or Latino of any race.

In 2000, the median income for a household in the MSA was $38,297, and the median income for a family was $44,810. Males had a median income of $33,480 versus $23,523 for females. The per capita income for the MSA was $17,558. In 2022, its median household income was $52,574.

County	Seat	2025 estimate	2020 Census	Change	Area	Density
Bibb	Macon	157,556	157,346	+0.13%	255 sq mi (660 km^{2})	618/sq mi (239/km^{2})
Monroe	Forsyth	32,023	27,957	+14.54%	398 sq mi (1,031 km^{2})	80/sq mi (31/km^{2})
Jones	Gray	29,171	28,347	+2.91%	395 sq mi (1,023 km^{2})	74/sq mi (29/km^{2})
Crawford	Knoxville	12,206	12,130	+0.63%	326 sq mi (844 km^{2})	37/sq mi (14/km^{2})
Twiggs	Jeffersonville	7,597	8,022	−5.30%	363 sq mi (940 km^{2})	21/sq mi (8/km^{2})
Total		238,553	233,802	+2.03%	1,737 sq mi (4,499 km^{2})	137/sq mi (53/km^{2})

== Combined statistical area ==
The Macon-Bibb County–Warner Robins, GA combined statistical area (CSA) includes seven counties in Georgia within the Macon and Warner Robins metropolitan statistical areas. As of the 2020 census, the CSA had a population of 425,416. As of July 1, 2025, the population was estimated to be 446,644.

=== Component metropolitan statistical areas (MSAs) ===
- Macon-Bibb County MSA (Bibb, Crawford, Jones, Monroe, and Twiggs counties)
- Warner Robins MSA (Houston and Peach counties)

Statistical Area	2025 estimate	2020 Census	Change	Area	Density
Macon-Bibb County, GA Metropolitan Statistical Area	238,553	233,802	+2.03%	1,737 sq mi (4,499 km^{2})	137/sq mi (53/km^{2})
Warner Robins, GA Metropolitan Statistical Area	208,091	191,614	+8.60%	531 sq mi (1,375 km^{2})	392/sq mi (151/km^{2})
Total	446,644	425,416	+4.99%	2,268 sq mi (5,874 km^{2})	92/sq mi (35/km^{2})

== See also ==
- Central Georgia
- Georgia census statistical areas
