= Bibb County, Georgia =

County in Georgia, United States

- County
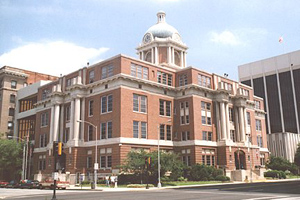
- Bibb County courthouse in Macon

- Location within the U.S. state of Georgia
- Coordinates: 32°48′N 83°42′W
- Country: United States
- State: Georgia
- Founded: December 9, 1822; 203 years ago
- Named for: William Wyatt Bibb
- Seat: Macon
- Largest city: Macon

Area
  - Total: 255 sq mi (660 km^{2})
  - Land: 250 sq mi (650 km^{2})
  - Water: 5.6 sq mi (15 km^{2}) 2.2%

Population (2020)
  - Total: 157,346
  - Estimate (2025): 157,556 ▲
  - Density: 629/sq mi (243/km^{2})
- Time zone: UTC−5 (Eastern)
  - Summer (DST): UTC−4 (EDT)
- Congressional districts: 2nd, 8th
- Website: maconbibb.us

Bibb County is located in the U.S. state of Georgia. As of the 2020 census, its population was 157,346. Bibb County is geographically located in the Central Georgia (Middle Georgia) region, and is the largest county in the Macon metropolitan area (metropolitan statistical area).

Bibb County has a consolidated city-county government following a merger of the county with its county seat and largest city, Macon, in 2014. They were later joined in this consolidated government in 2015 by the county's only other municipality, Payne City.

== History ==
This area was inhabited for thousands of years by successive indigenous peoples. The Ocmulgee National Monument is a national park and historic site incorporating two major mound and town complexes: Lamar Mounds and Village Site and Ocmulgee Mound Site, both located along the Ocmulgee River. They were built by indigenous peoples during the Mississippian culture era. The detailed chronicles of the Hernando de Soto expedition recorded visiting Ichisi, a major village, in 1539. Historians and archeologists have theorized it may have been located at the Lamar Mounds complex.

For centuries, the historic Native Americans Muscogee tribe, descendants of this culture, was the predominant one in a large area of Georgia, including that later organized as Bibb County. During the colonial period, Anglo colonists carried on a brisk trade with them and allied with them in certain wars in the Southeast. With European-American land hunger to extend cotton cultivation in the Georgia uplands, the Muscogee and other four Civilized Tribes of the Southeast were forcibly relocated to Indian Territory west of the Mississippi River, in the Indian Removal of the 1830s, during the administration of President Andrew Jackson. The Indian tribes affected refer to their journey is as the "Trail of Tears", since many died during the march west.

In the late 18th century, the cotton gin was invented, making profitable the processing of short-staple cotton. This could be grown across the uplands of the South, in contrast to the long-staple cotton of the Low Country. Bibb is considered one of the counties of the "Black Belt", which originally referred to the fertile dark soil in these uplands. The area was developed by European-American planters, who used enslaved African Americans as workers to clear land and develop large cotton plantations during the antebellum years. Cotton generated high profits, since it was in demand in the textile mills of the northern states and England. By the 1860 census, shortly before the American Civil War, more than a million enslaved African Americans lived in Georgia, and they constituted a majority of the population in much of the Black Belt.

Bibb County was created by act of the Georgia Legislature on December 9, 1822, with Macon to be incorporated as a town/city in December 1823; designated the county seat. It was carved from the earlier territories of the counties of Jones, Monroe, Houston, and Twiggs Counties. The county seat has not been changed since, and no other subsequent county in the state has ever been created ("erected") out of land from Bibb County.

The county was named for Dr. William Wyatt Bibb, a physician from Elbert County, who served in the U.S. House of Representatives and United States Senate from Georgia. After he moved to the new Alabama Territory, he was later elected as the first governor of the new State of Alabama upon its admission.

=== Civil War to present ===
During the Civil War, an estimated 10% of the white males in the county lost their lives while serving in the Confederate States Army. The war gained the emancipation of slaves across the South. Georgia had been a battleground, and Atlanta and many other areas were left in ruins.

Well into the 20th century, the county depended on cotton and other agriculture as its economic base. It was subject to related vagaries of weather, financial markets, and the devastation of the invasive boll weevil in the early 20th century, which destroyed cotton crops across the South.

After the Civil War and during the 20th century, the county seat of Macon continued to serve as the county's principal population center, site of the most significant landmarks, and the location of major historical events.

On July 31, 2012, voters in the City of Macon (57.8% approval) and Bibb County (56.7% approval) passed a referendum to merge the governments of the city and the county, based on the authorization of House Bill 1171 passed by the Georgia General Assembly earlier in the year. Four previous consolidation attempts (in 1933, 1960, 1972, and 1976) had failed. The consolidation took effect on January 1, 2014, along with the deannexation from the city of a small portion of land in Jones County.

In addition to Macon, Bibb County contained one other municipality, Payne City (or Payne), an enclave of around 200 people that was surrounded entirely by the preconsolidation City of Macon. In the 2012 referendum, Payne City voters rejected consolidation by a vote of 9 to 7, so it was not merged into the consolidated government. In early 2015, at the request of the small city's government, the Georgia General Assembly passed a bill dissolving Payne City, merging it with the rest of Macon-Bibb County.

== Geography ==
According to the U.S. Census Bureau, the county has a total area of 255 square miles (660 km^{2}), of which 250 square miles (650 km^{2}) is land and 5.6 square miles (15 km^{2}) (2.2%) is water. The entirety of Bibb County is located in the Upper Ocmulgee River sub-basin of the Altamaha River basin.

=== Adjacent counties ===
- Jones County – northeast
- Twiggs County – east
- Houston County – south
- Peach County – south-southwest
- Crawford County – southwest
- Monroe County – northwest

=== National protected areas ===
- Bond Swamp National Wildlife Refuge (part)
- Ocmulgee National Monument

== Communities ==
=== Cities ===
- Macon (county seat)
- Payne

=== Unincorporated communities ===
- Avondale
- Franklinton
- Lizella
- Sofkee
- Walden
- Rutland

== Demographics ==
Historical population
Census	Pop.	Note	%±
1830	7,154		—
1840	9,802		37.0%
1850	12,699		29.6%
1860	16,291		28.3%
1870	21,255		30.5%
1880	27,147		27.7%
1890	42,370		56.1%
1900	50,473		19.1%
1910	56,646		12.2%
1920	71,304		25.9%
1930	77,042		8.0%
1940	83,783		8.7%
1950	114,079		36.2%
1960	141,249		23.8%
1970	143,418		1.5%
1980	150,256		4.8%
1990	149,967		−0.2%
2000	153,887		2.6%
2010	155,547		1.1%
2020	157,346		1.2%
2025 (est.)	157,556	▲	0.1%
U.S. Decennial Census; 1790-1880 1890-1910; 1920-1930 1930-1940; 1940-1950 1960-1980; 1980-2000 2010 2020

=== Racial and ethnic composition ===
Bibb County, Georgia – Racial and ethnic composition Note: the US Census treats Hispanic/Latino as an ethnic category. This table excludes Latinos from the racial categories and assigns them to a separate category. Hispanics/Latinos may be of any race.
Race / Ethnicity (NH = Non-Hispanic)	Pop 1980	Pop 1990	Pop 2000	Pop 2010	Pop 2020	% 1980	% 1990	% 2000	% 2010	% 2020
White alone (NH)	90,953	85,744	76,262	65,494	56,787	60.53%	57.18%	49.56%	42.11%	36.09%
Black or African American alone (NH)	57,627	62,330	72,503	80,744	85,234	38.35%	41.56%	47.11%	51.91%	54.17%
Native American or Alaska Native alone (NH)	109	180	255	287	281	0.07%	0.12%	0.17%	0.18%	0.18%
Asian alone (NH)	446	766	1,632	2,492	3,209	0.30%	0.51%	1.06%	1.60%	2.04%
Native Hawaiian or Pacific Islander alone (NH)	x	x	35	74	42	x	x	0.02%	0.05%	0.03%
Other race alone (NH)	85	31	92	215	602	0.06%	0.02%	0.06%	0.14%	0.38%
Mixed race or Multiracial (NH)	x	x	1,085	1,852	4,454	x	x	0.71%	1.19%	2.83%
Hispanic or Latino (any race)	1,036	916	2,023	4,389	6,737	0.69%	0.61%	1.31%	2.82%	4.28%
Total	150,256	149,967	153,887	155,547	157,346	100.00%	100.00%	100.00%	100.00%	100.00%

=== 2020 census ===
As of the 2020 census, the county had a population of 157,346. Of the residents, 23.2% were under the age of 18 and 16.9% were 65 years of age or older; the median age was 37.9 years. For every 100 females there were 89.1 males, and for every 100 females age 18 and over there were 85.2 males. 85.9% of residents lived in urban areas and 14.1% lived in rural areas.

There were 62,762 households in the county, including 33,573 families; 29.7% had children under the age of 18 living with them and 40.0% had a female householder with no spouse or partner present. About 32.9% of all households were made up of individuals and 12.7% had someone living alone who was 65 years of age or older.

There were 71,901 housing units, of which 12.7% were vacant. Among occupied housing units, 50.0% were owner-occupied and 50.0% were renter-occupied. The homeowner vacancy rate was 2.1% and the rental vacancy rate was 9.4%.

== Crime ==
In 2022, Bibb County had the highest crime rate in Georgia. Bibb County had a rate of 52.6 crimes per 1,000 residents.

== Government and politics ==
Since the 2014 consolidation, Macon-Bibb has been governed by a mayor, elected at-large (county-wide), along with a nine-member county commission with members elected from single-member districts.

Like all other Georgia counties, Bibb has an elected sheriff responsible for maintaining the jail. Bibb's sheriff also manages the county's law enforcement duties, with their deputies acting as the city and county police force. As of 2019, the current sheriff is David Davis.

Bibb County is divided between Georgia's 2nd congressional district and Georgia's 8th congressional district in elections to the United States House of Representatives.

=== Elections ===
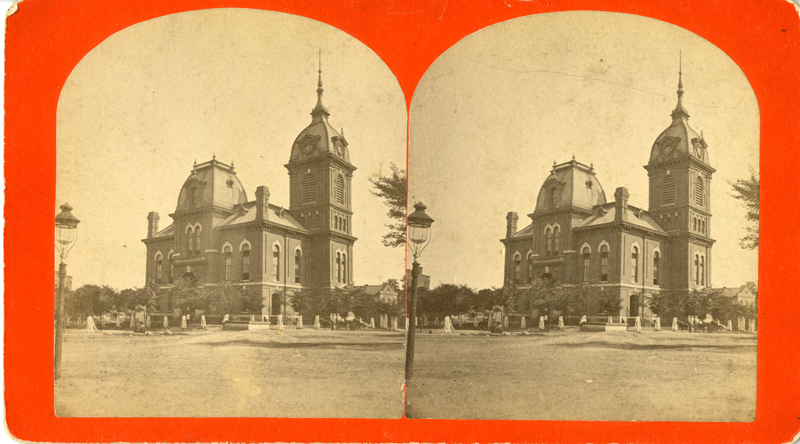
Bibb County Courthouse, circa 1876

In 2013, the consolidated city-county held its first elections. Macon's incumbent mayor Robert Reichert received 49% of the vote in the general election on September 17 over the other five mayoral candidates, but a winner had to take a majority of the vote. Reichert subsequently won 63% of the vote in a runoff election against former Macon mayor C. Jack Ellis. Reichert was unopposed for re-election in 2016, following the death of his only opponent before the election. Under the city-county charter, the mayor is subject to term limits and may serve only two consecutive terms. Reichert had to leave office in December 2020.

As an urban county with a majority African-American population, voters in Bibb County consistently vote at high rates for Democratic candidates in presidential elections. During the late 19th century and into the late 1960s, when most African Americans were disenfranchised by the state constitution and practices under Jim Crow, white conservatives dominated the Democratic Party and voting. The combination of these two contrasting affiliations resulted in the majority of county voters having supported for a Republican presidential candidate only three times in its history. Bibb was the only county in the 2004 flag referendum to vote to keep the 2001 flag.

United States presidential election results for Bibb County, Georgia
Year	Republican		Democratic		Third party(ies)	
Year	No.	%	No.	%	No.	%
1880	908	36.38%	1,588	63.62%	0	0.00%
1884	857	33.17%	1,727	66.83%	0	0.00%
1888	1,121	32.45%	2,215	64.11%	119	3.44%
1892	641	14.67%	3,627	83.00%	102	2.33%
1896	670	18.36%	1,854	50.81%	1,125	30.83%
1900	250	11.42%	1,897	86.66%	42	1.92%
1904	236	9.86%	2,117	88.47%	40	1.67%
1908	565	21.91%	1,946	75.46%	68	2.64%
1912	71	3.70%	1,741	90.82%	105	5.48%
1916	58	2.51%	2,048	88.77%	201	8.71%
1920	458	18.41%	2,030	81.59%	0	0.00%
1924	455	10.38%	3,647	83.17%	283	6.45%
1928	2,078	47.58%	2,289	52.42%	0	0.00%
1932	405	8.42%	4,372	90.93%	31	0.64%
1936	452	7.29%	5,722	92.34%	23	0.37%
1940	1,371	16.85%	6,729	82.70%	37	0.45%
1944	1,884	26.04%	5,352	73.96%	0	0.00%
1948	3,837	27.26%	7,011	49.80%	3,229	22.94%
1952	6,121	29.42%	14,687	70.58%	0	0.00%
1956	7,242	32.61%	14,966	67.39%	0	0.00%
1960	10,523	42.24%	14,387	57.76%	0	0.00%
1964	25,641	58.98%	17,831	41.02%	0	0.00%
1968	13,490	32.59%	10,579	25.55%	17,328	41.86%
1972	27,402	72.87%	10,201	27.13%	0	0.00%
1976	12,819	28.66%	31,902	71.34%	0	0.00%
1980	15,175	31.53%	31,770	66.01%	1,185	2.46%
1984	24,170	47.77%	26,427	52.23%	0	0.00%
1988	22,179	49.96%	22,084	49.74%	133	0.30%
1992	19,847	36.72%	28,070	51.93%	6,132	11.35%
1996	20,778	41.61%	26,727	53.53%	2,427	4.86%
2000	24,071	48.36%	24,996	50.22%	709	1.42%
2004	28,107	48.64%	29,322	50.74%	359	0.62%
2008	27,037	40.69%	38,987	58.67%	424	0.64%
2012	25,623	39.54%	38,585	59.54%	595	0.92%
2016	24,043	38.24%	36,787	58.50%	2,050	3.26%
2020	26,559	37.53%	43,408	61.34%	796	1.12%
2024	26,658	38.53%	42,172	60.96%	351	0.51%

United States Senate election results for Bibb County, Georgia2
Year	Republican		Democratic		Third party(ies)	
Year	No.	%	No.	%	No.	%
2020	26,645	38.07%	41,928	59.91%	1,414	2.02%
2020	23,748	37.42%	39,717	62.58%	0	0.00%

United States Senate election results for Bibb County, Georgia3
Year	Republican		Democratic		Third party(ies)	
Year	No.	%	No.	%	No.	%
2020	14,584	20.85%	30,896	44.18%	24,460	34.97%
2020	23,555	37.08%	39,972	62.92%	0	0.00%
2022	20,203	37.41%	33,105	61.30%	699	1.29%
2022	18,342	37.16%	31,017	62.84%	0	0.00%

Georgia Gubernatorial election results for Bibb County
Year	Republican		Democratic		Third party(ies)	
Year	No.	%	No.	%	No.	%
2022	22,396	41.32%	31,514	58.14%	290	0.54%

=== United States Congress ===
Senators	Name	Party	Assumed Office	Level
Senate Class 2	Raphael Warnock	Democratic	2021	
Senate Class 3	Jon Ossoff	Democratic	2021	
Representatives	Name	Party	Assumed Office	
District 2	Sanford Bishop	Democratic	1993	
District 8	Austin Scott	Republican	2011	

=== Georgia General Assembly ===
==== Georgia State Senate ====
District	Name	Party	Assumed office
18	John F. Kennedy	Republican	2015
25	Rick Williams	Republican	2023
51	David Lucas	Democratic	2011

==== Georgia House of Representatives ====
District	Name	Party	Assumed office
140	Robert Dickey	Republican	2011
141	Allen Peake	Republican	2011
142	Miriam Paris	Democratic	2017
143	James Beverly	Democratic	2011
144	Bubber Epps	Republican	2008

== Recreation ==
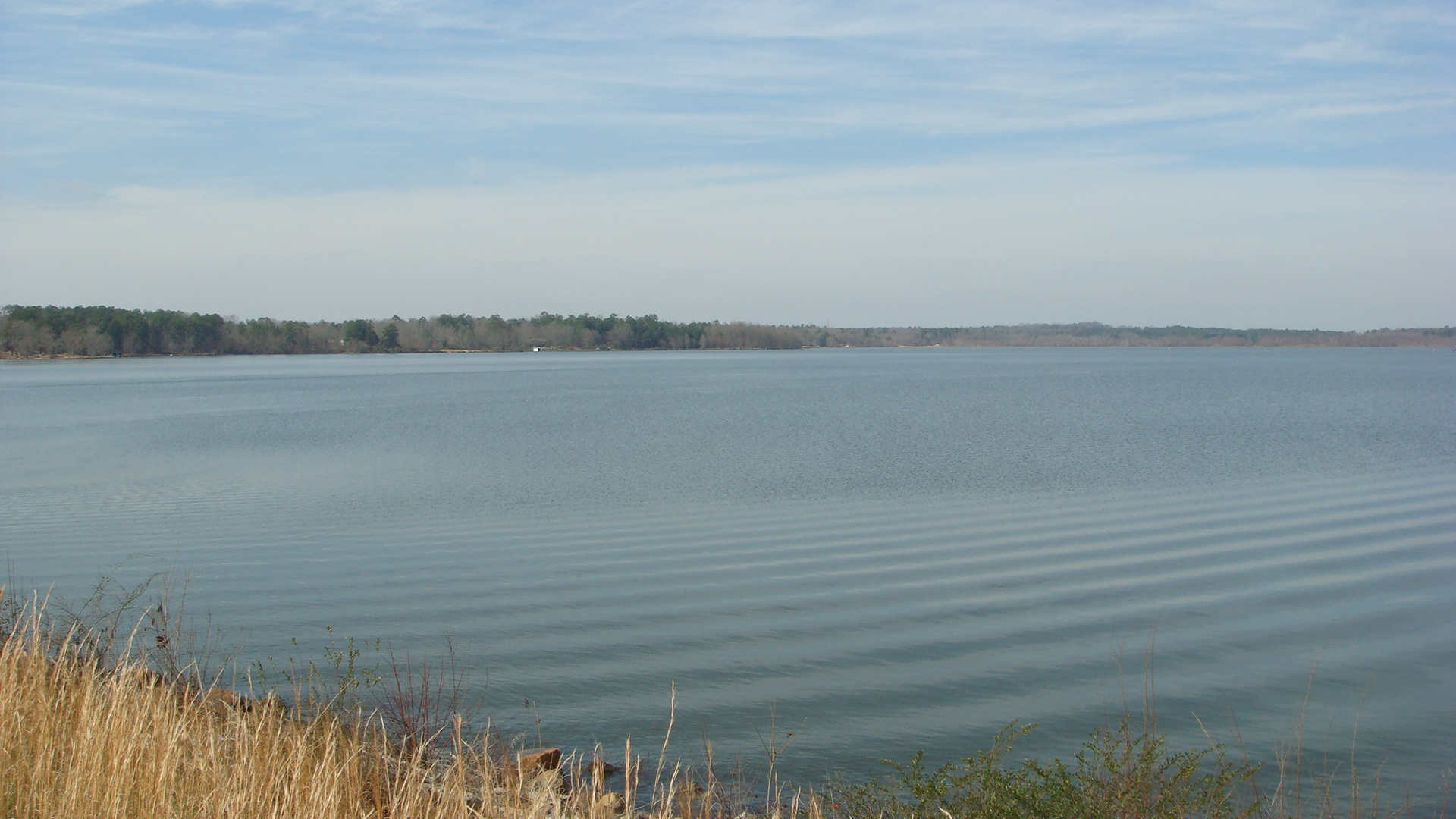
Lake Tobesofkee in the Wintertime

Lake Tobesofkee, about 10 miles (16 km) west of Macon, has three parks. Claystone, Sandy Beach, and Arrowhead Parks, each with a beach, and children's playgrounds. Sandy Beach has lighted tennis courts, a water park with many attractions, and a softball field.

== Education ==
Bibb County School District is the school district covering all of the consolidated city-county.

== Transportation ==
=== Major highways ===
- I-16 / SR 404
- I-75 / SR 401
- I-475 / SR 408
- US 23 / SR 87
  - SR 87 Conn.
- US 41
  - US 41 Bus. (Macon)
- US 80
- US 129
  - US 129 Alt. (Macon)
- SR 11
- SR 19
- SR 22
- SR 49
- SR 57
- SR 74
- SR 247
- SR 540 (Fall Line Freeway)

=== Public transportation ===
- The Macon Transit Authority provides bus service to the residents of Bibb County, including the City of Macon. Their headquarters, and major transit hub is the former Terminal Station in Macon.

=== Pedestrians and cycling ===
- Heritage Trail
- Ocmulgee Heritage Trail

== See also ==
- National Register of Historic Places listings in Bibb County, Georgia
- List of counties in Georgia
