= WRNC (North Carolina) =

Radio station in Reidsville, North Carolina, United States (1947–1992)

- Reidsville, North Carolina; United States
- Broadcast area: Rockingham County, North Carolina
- Frequency: 1600 kHz

Programming
- Language: English

Ownership
- Owner: Wright Broadcasting Corp.

History
- First air date: 1947
- Last air date: 1992
- Former call signs: WFRC (1947-79); WKXQ (1979-82)
- Call sign meaning: Reidsvile, North Carolina

Technical information
- Facility ID: 73949
- Power: 1,000 watts (day); 1,000 watts (night)

WRNC (1600 AM) was an American radio station licensed to serve the community of Reidsville, North Carolina. WRNC was one of three radio stations licensed to operate in the city and one of seven that once operated in Rockingham County, North Carolina. The station was licensed to broadcast on 1600 kHz. Its power output was 1,000 watts and used a three tower antenna system, broadcasting both day and night at full power from the transmitter site located on North Carolina Highway 87, west of Reidsville.

== History ==
The station was initially licensed in 1947 as WFRC, owned by the Piedmont Carolina Broadcasting Company. The original studios were located in downtown Reidsville at the northern corner of South Scales and Gilmer Streets. The programming audio was fed by a telephone loop to the transmitter site on North Carolina Highway 87 (West Harrison Street) which also served as residence for the engineering staff. In the early 1970s, the owners of WFRC moved the studios and offices to the transmitter site.

Operating at 1 kW, the three tower array for the station was used at night to direct the signal and avoid interference with other stations. The night signal pattern was northwest and southeast. During daytime operations, only the center tower emitted the broadcast signal. Until the late 1970s, the station used one transmitter, a tube type Raytheon RA-1000. But it later became a backup when the station purchased a Rockwell-Collins "The Rock" 820 D-2 transmitter. The station switched signal patterns at sunset and sunrise using a Gates antenna phasor.

In November 1979, the station was sold to new stockholders, organizing as the Rockingham Radio Corporation, which changed the call letters to WKXQ. The calls changed again to WRNC in 1982. Three sales followed in the mid-1980s.

In 1987, due to intense competition from FM stations in the nearby Greensboro market, the station signed off for several months under silent authority. But with threats of permanent license revocation from the Federal Communications Commission (FCC), the station signed back on the air as a daytime broadcast only station. With failing equipment and no revenue, WRNC finally signed off the air several months later and the owners surrendered the license to the FCC.

In the early 1990s, all of the station's equipment and property, including all three towers, was auctioned off to the public. The property is now privately owned and all that remains are the building which has been gutted. All three towers were dropped and removed from the premises.

== Programming ==
Under all three call signs, the station was an ABC News Radio affiliate station and aired news and sports from the ABC Entertainment Network. It was also an Associated Press newswire station as well as a Tobacco Radio Network affiliate.
