= List of people from Macon, Georgia =

This is a list of notable people from Macon, Georgia.

== Academia ==
- Catherine Brewer Benson, first woman to earn a bachelor's degree from Wesleyan
- David P. Currie, professor at the University of Chicago Law School
- Bascom S. Deaver, professor and assistant chairman for undergraduate studies of the physics department at the University of Virginia
- Patrick Francis Healy, 29th president of Georgetown University
- John LeConte, president of University of California
- Joseph LeConte, geologist; professor at Oglethorpe University and South Carolina College (now the University of South Carolina)
- Earl W. McDaniel, Regents Professor of Physics at the Georgia Institute of Technology and the Georgia Tech Research Institute
- William Sanders Scarborough, president of Wilberforce University
- Sidney David Williams, president of Elizabeth City State Teachers College, now Elizabeth City State University

== Art and architecture ==
- Mathuren Arthur Andrieu, painter
- Ellamae Ellis League, architect, first female FAIA from Georgia
- Neel Reid, architect
- Leila Ross Wilburn, one of the first female architects in Georgia

== Business ==
- Hubert Humphrey, founder and CEO of multi-level marketing financial and insurance services company World Marketing Alliance nka World Financial Group

== Entertainment ==
=== Television and film ===
- Luke Askew, actor, Walker, Texas Ranger
- Blake Clark, actor, several Adam Sandler films and Boy Meets World
- Charles Coburn, Academy Award-winning actor, films including The More the Merrier and The Devil and Miss Jones
- Rick Devens, reality television star
- Melvyn Douglas, Oscar-winning actor, Hud, Being There, Ninotchka
- Sam Edwards, actor, Little House on the Prairie
- Montego Glover, actress, Broadway
- Nancy Grace, television personality
- Victoria Groce, Jeopardy! Masters champion and television personality
- Grey Henson, actor, Mean Girls
- Sasha Hutchings, actress, Hamilton, Broadway
- Felix Knight, actor and tenor, Babes in Toyland
- Marcus Lamb, founder of international Christian TV network called Daystar Television Network
- Natalia Livingston, Emmy Award-winning actor, including Days of Our Lives and General Hospital
- Jack McBrayer, actor, 30 Rock, Wreck-It Ralph
- Rhett McLaughlin, YouTuber with Link Neal for the channels Rhett and Link and Good Mythical Morning
- Corliss Palmer, silent screen actress and model; lived in Macon and worked at the Dempsey Hotel
- Carrie Preston, actress, True Blood, The Good Wife
- Shavar Ross, actor
- Lisa Sheridan, actress
- Laurence Stallings, screenwriter, playwright, lyricist, and literary critic
- Cassie Yates, actress

=== Music ===
- Jason Aldean, country music singer
- The Allman Brothers, Southern rock band
- Bill Berry, member of R.E.M.; lived in Macon in early 1970s
- Claudine Clark, R&B musician and composer
- Randy Crawford, jazz and R&B singer
- Buddy Greene, singer-songwriter, guitar player and harmonica player; gospel music
- Ronnie Hammond, lead singer, Atlanta Rhythm Section
- Mark Heard, record producer, folk-rock singer-songwriter
- Lucille Hegamin, singer, entertainer, pioneer African-American blues music recording artist
- Randy Howard, outlaw country singer
- Jerry Jemmott, soul bassist
- Johnny Jenkins, blues guitarist
- Ben Johnston, composer of contemporary music
- Rosa King, jazz and blues saxophonist, singer
- Chuck Leavell, Allman Brothers and Rolling Stones pianist
- Little Richard, singer-songwriter, and pianist; pioneer of rock and roll
- Robert McDuffie, violinist
- Emmett Miller, minstrel show singer noted for a yodel-like falsetto voice
- Mike Mills, member of R.E.M.; lived in Macon in early 1960s–1970s
- The Pickens Sisters, singing trio
- The Reddings, Dexter Redding, Otis Redding III, and Mark Lockett
- Otis Redding, soul musician
- Margaret Vardell Sandresky, composer
- Howard Tate, soul singer-songwriter
- Eddie Tigner, blues pianist and singer
- Torres, musician
- Phil Walden, record producer and music businessman

== Law ==
- Beverly Harvard, first black female police chief of a major city (Atlanta) in the United States, former US marshal
- Rufus Youngblood, deputy director of the US Secret Service; bodyguard of Lyndon B. Johnson at the time of the assassination of John F. Kennedy; born in Macon

== Literature and journalism ==
- Mary Ross Banks, litterateur and author
- LeRoy Wiley Gresham, disabled person during the American Civil War who left behind diaries which were later published
- Ozella Shields Head, writer
- John Oliver Killens, fiction writer
- Sidney Lanier, poet, novelist, and musician
- Lydia Meredith, author
- Eric Newcomer, journalist
- Gwyn Hyman Rubio, author
- Anya Krugovoy Silver, poet

== Military ==
- William Shepherd Benson, admiral in the United States Navy; first chief of Naval Operations (CNO), holding the post throughout World War I
- Rodney Maxwell Davis, Medal of Honor recipient, Vietnam War (buried outside the city due to his race)
- Eugene Ely, first naval aviator; crashed and died in Macon in 1911, in an exhibition, after removing his front elevator from his plane
- Michael A. Healy, captain in United States Revenue Cutter Service
- Arnold L. Punaro, major general, United States Marine Corps
- George D. Webster, brigadier general of the United States Marine Corps
- Blanton Winship, major general of the United States Army, Judge Advocate General

== Organizations and advocacy ==
- Samaria (Mitcham) Bailey, local civil rights activist and trailblazer
- Sarah Randolph Bailey, educator and Girl Scout pioneer
- Ellen and William Craft, abolitionist leaders
- Lucy Craft Laney, African-American educator who in 1883 founded the first school for black children in Augusta, Georgia
- Harriet Nisbet Latta, founding state regent of the North Carolina Society of the Daughters of the American Revolution
- Edgar Wayburn, longtime Sierra Club president, helped double U.S. parkland

== Politics and government ==
- Augustus O. Bacon, U.S. senator and president pro tempore of the United States Senate
- Charles Lafayette Bartlett, U.S. congressman
- John C. Daniels, mayor of New Haven, Connecticut and Connecticut state senator
- Nate Holden, former California state senator
- Perry Keith, former member of the Louisiana House of Representatives
- Jim Marshall, mayor and U.S. congressman
- David Perdue, former United States senator of Georgia
- P. B. S. Pinchback, Republican governor of Louisiana for 35 days from 1872 to 1873
- Christopher N. Smith, honorary consul of the Kingdom of Denmark
- Ronnie Thompson, city's first Republican mayor, Republican candidate for governor of Georgia in 1974, gospel and country singer

== Religion ==
- John Birch, missionary
- Randolph Claiborne, 5th bishop of the Episcopal Diocese of Atlanta
- James Augustine Healy, first African-American Roman Catholic bishop in United States

== Science and medicine ==
- Sonny Carter, NASA astronaut and United States Navy aviator
- Celestine Smith, psychoanalyst; the first Black Jungian psychoanalyst

== Sports ==
- Julius Adams, NFL football player, New England Patriots
- Dave Bristol, former MLB manager of Cincinnati Reds, Milwaukee Brewers, Atlanta Braves, and San Francisco Giants
- Durant Brooks, former NFL player
- Kevin Brown, MLB pitcher
- Bobby Bryant, football player
- Mallory Burdette, tennis player
- Sugar Cain, baseball player
- Chris Crawford, NFL cheerleader, Carolina Panthers
- Bud Dupree, NFL player
- Larry Emery, football player
- Terry Fair, Aprofessional basketball player
- Ron Fairly, Major League Baseball player and broadcaster
- Gerald Fitch, NBA player
- George Foster, NFL player
- Tony Gilbert, former NFL player
- Terrance Gore, MLB player
- Russell Henley, golfer on PGA Tour
- Richard Howard, U.S. bobsled athlete; silver medalist America's Cup; attended Southwest High School
- Kareem Jackson, BCS champion with Alabama Crimson Tide, now cornerback for the NFL's Denver Broncos
- Roger Jackson, football player
- Marquette King, former NFL player
- Al Lucas, football player in NFL and Arena Football League
- Jeff Malone, NBA player
- Cole Miller, UFC fighter and reality television star; raised in Macon and attended Mount de Sales Academy
- Chip Minton, member of 1994 and 1998 U.S. Olympic bobsled teams
- Quintez Cephus, NFL player
- Norm Nixon, NBA player
- Blue Moon Odom, MLB pitcher, won three World Series with Oakland Athletics, born in Macon
- Jim Parker, NFL Hall of Famer for Baltimore Colts; born in Macon
- Jerry Pate, pro golfer
- Myles Patrick, basketball player
- Antonio Pettigrew, sprinter, 1991 world champion in 400 meters; disqualified 2000 Sydney Olympics gold medalist
- Kevin Reimer, MLB player for Texas Rangers and Milwaukee Brewers
- John Rocker, MLB pitcher
- Theron Sapp, University of Georgia and NFL football player
- Ken Shamrock, UFC champion and former professional wrestler;
- DeAndre Smelter, NFL player
- Elmore Smith, NBA player
- Le Kevin Smith, former NFL player for New England Patriots and Denver Broncos; attended Stratford Academy
- Vernon "Catfish" Smith, football player
- J. T. Thomas, football player
- Charles Tidwell, NASCAR pioneer
- Corey Williams, NBA basketball Champion, Chicago Bulls
- Sharone Wright, basketball player

== Others ==
- Carla Koplin Cohn, personal secretary to Hall of Fame Hank Aaron during his home run chase
- Wilbur Mitcham, Southern chef

== Fictional ==
- Lee Everett, main character of the 2012 video game The Walking Dead
