= Joseph Pancoast =

American surgeon

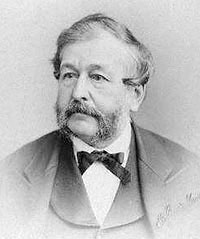
- Born: November 23, 1805; Springfield Township, Burlington County, New Jersey, United States
- Died: March 6, 1882 (aged 76); Philadelphia, Pennsylvania, United States
- Occupations: Surgeon; Professor
- Spouse: Rebecca Abbott
- Children: William Henry Pancoast
- Parent(s): John Pancoast; Ann Abbott

Joseph Pancoast (November 23, 1805 – March 6, 1882) was an American surgeon. His name is eponymic to the practice of surgery, in general, and cosmetic surgery, in particular.

Pancoast was responsible for many seminal advancements in surgery that he described, and were depicted graphically, in numerous scholarly articles and books. His greatest work, A Treatise on Operative Surgery, was published in 1844. Famous for his lectures and clinics in anatomy and surgery, Pancoast also received attention for his ability to perform surgery with either hand as he was ambidextrous. Furthermore, Pancoast was the first to demonstrate a substitute eyebrow coined a "long pedicle", and frequently replaced eyelids and ears. Pancoast was also among the first to section facial nerve to relieve neuralgia. On the eye, Pancoast operated upon cataracts. He also performed major surgery such as amputations at the hip-joint, as well as lithotomy.

== Biography ==
Pancoast was born of Quaker parentage at Springfield Township, Burlington County, New Jersey, the son of John Pancoast (1771 – 1841) and Ann Abbott, his wife. Joseph Pancoast married Rebecca Abbott.

In 1828, Pancoast was awarded a degree in medicine by the University of Pennsylvania School of Medicine, Philadelphia, Pennsylvania. From 1839 to 1841, he was Chairman of the Department of Surgery at Jefferson Medical College. From 1841 until his resignation in 1874, Pancoast was Chairman of the Department of Anatomy at the same institution. He was succeeded by his son, William Henry Pancoast, who was also a renowned surgeon. One of his patients was the famous diarist LeRoy Wiley Gresham.

Pancoast was elected to the American Philosophical Society in 1851.

== Bibliography (partial) ==
- Pancoast, Joseph (1827). The erectile tissue. Thesis—University of Pennsylvania, 1828.
- Lobstein, Jean Frédéric. ''A treatise on the structure, functions and diseases of the human sympathetic nerve.'' Philadelphia : J. G. Auner, 1831. Translation by Joseph Pancoast.
- Pancoast, Joseph (1835). An introductory lecture delivered at the commencement of the winter course of anatomy: for 1834-5. Philadelphia: W.P. Gibbons.
- Pancoast, Joseph (1844). A treatise on operative surgery: comprising a description of the various processes of the art, including all the new operations; exhibiting the state of surgical science in its present advanced condition; with eighty plates, containing four hundred and eighty-six separate illustrations. Philadelphia: Carey and Hart.
