= General Tracy =

General Tracy is the name of:

- Edward D. Tracy (1833–1863), brigadier general of the Confederate States Army during the American Civil War
- Benjamin F. Tracy (April 26, 1830 – August 6, 1915), an American political figure who served as Secretary of the Navy
