= Senator Cabaniss =

Senator Cabaniss may refer to:

- Thomas Banks Cabaniss (1835–1915), Georgia State Senate
- William J. Cabaniss (born 1938), Alabama State Senate
