= Senator Rutherford =

Senator Rutherford may refer to:

- Dan Rutherford (born 1955), Illinois State Senate
- Griffith Rutherford (1721–1805), North Carolina State Senate
- J. T. Rutherford (1921–2006), Texas State Senate
- Samuel Rutherford (Georgia politician) (1870–1932), Georgia State Senate
- John Rutherfurd (1760–1840), U.S. Senator from New Jersey
