= Carlton Mobley =

American judge

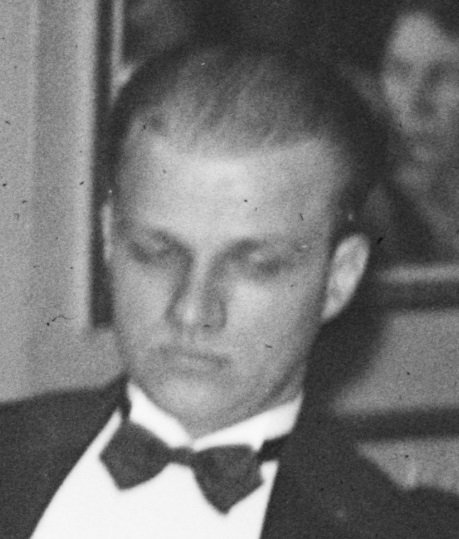
- Mobley in 1932

Member of the U.S. House of Representatives from Georgia's 6th district
- In office March 2, 1932 – March 3, 1933
- Preceded by: Samuel Rutherford
- Succeeded by: Carl Vinson

Chief Justice of the Georgia Supreme Court
- In office 1972 – 1974

Associate Justice of the Georgia Supreme Court
- In office 1954 – 1972

Personal details
- Born: William Carlton Mobley; December 7, 1906 Jones County, Georgia
- Died: October 14, 1981 (aged 74) Atlanta, Georgia
- Resting place: Forsyth, Georgia
- Party: Democratic
- Education: Mercer University

Military service
- Allegiance: United States
- Branch/service: United States Navy
- Years of service: 1943 – 1946
- Rank: Lieutenant commander
- Battles/wars: World War II

William Carlton Mobley (December 7, 1906 – October 14, 1981) was a jurist and politician from the American state of Georgia. He is one of the youngest people to ever be elected to the United States House of Representatives, having entered the house at the age of 25.

== Early years and education ==
Mobley was born near Hillsboro, Jones County, Georgia, and graduated from Mercer University with a law degree in 1928. While at Mercer, he was a member of Sigma Pi Fraternity.

== Political service and law career ==
Mobley practiced law in Forsyth, Georgia before serving as secretary to Congressman Samuel Rutherford from 1929 to 1932. In 1932, Mobley was elected as a Democrat to the United States House of Representatives representing Georgia's 6th congressional district (Rutherford had died in office; Mobley was elected in a special election to replace him). Mobley did not seek reelection. Subsequently, Mobley served in Georgia's Executive Department from 1934 to 1937, under Governor Eugene Talmadge; as an Assistant Attorney General of Georgia from 1941 to 1943; as a Lieutenant Commander in the United States Navy from 1943 to 1946; and as a justice of the Supreme Court of Georgia from 1954 to 1974, including a term as chief justice from 1972 to 1974.

== Later years ==
Following retirement from the Court, he resided in Atlanta, Georgia until his death on October 14, 1981. He is interred in Forsyth, Georgia.

U.S. House of Representatives
Preceded by Samuel Rutherford	Member of the U.S. House of Representatives from Georgia's 6th congressional district March 2, 1932 – March 4, 1933	Succeeded by Carl Vinson
