= Rose Hill Cemetery (Macon, Georgia) =

Historic cemetery in Bibb County, Georgia

- U.S. National Register of Historic Places
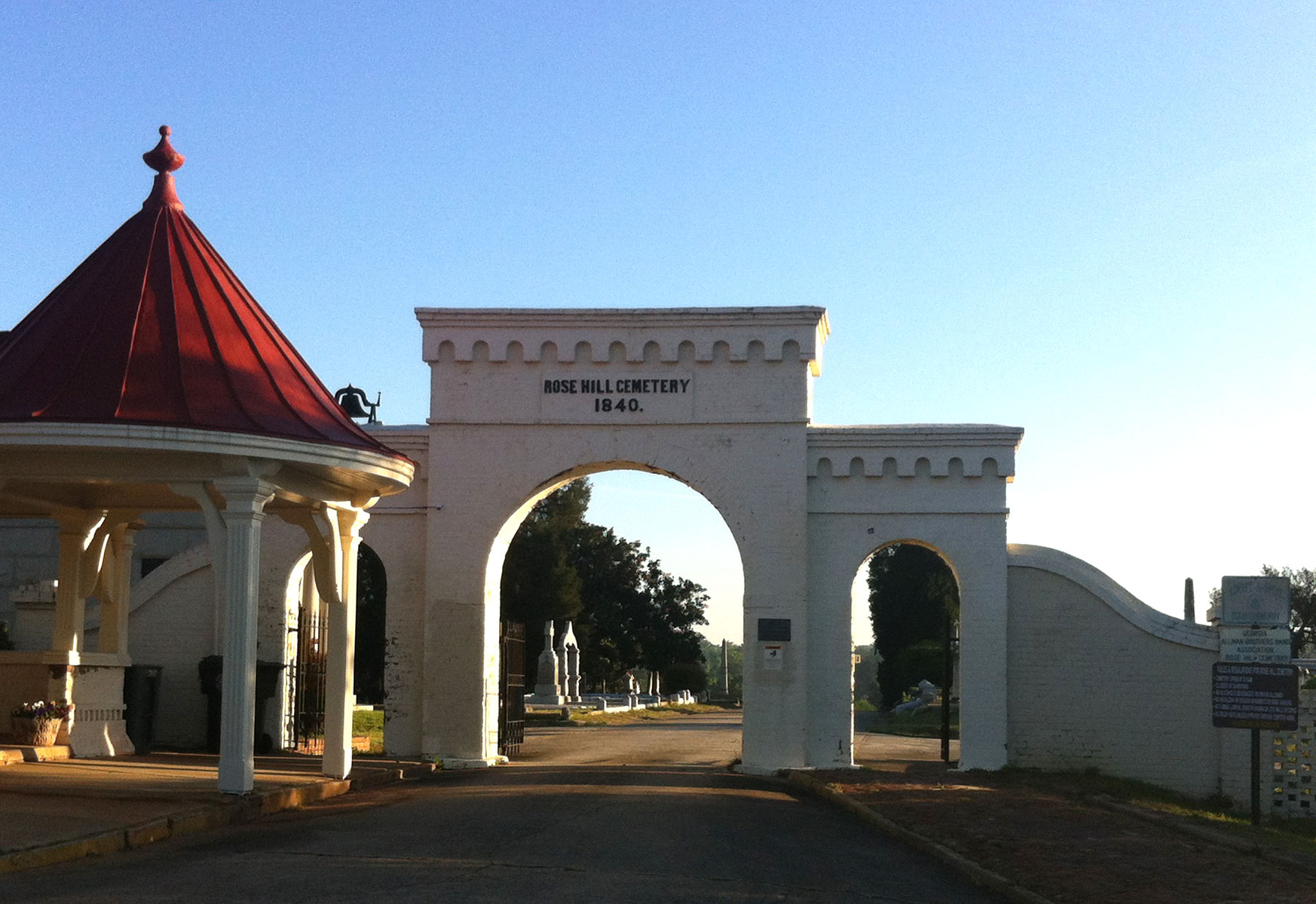
- Entrance in April 2014

- Location within Georgia Location within the United States
- Location: Riverside Dr., Macon, Georgia
- Coordinates: 32°50′53″N 83°37′59″W
- Built: 1840
- Architect: Rose, Simri
- NRHP reference No.: 73000611
- Added to NRHP: October 09, 1973

Rose Hill Cemetery is a 50-acre cemetery located on the banks of the Ocmulgee River in Macon, Georgia, United States, that opened in 1840. Simri Rose, a horticulturist and designer of the cemetery, was instrumental in the planning of the city of Macon and planned Rose Hill Cemetery in return for being able to choose his own burial plot. The cemetery is named in his honor.

Rose Hill Cemetery was a hangout and artistic inspiration for the Allman Brothers Band during their early years. The Allman Brothers' slide guitarist Duane Allman, keyboardist and vocalist Gregg Allman, drummer Butch Trucks and bassist Berry Oakley are interred here.

It was listed on the National Register of Historic Places in 1973.

== Construction ==
Simri Rose, Ambrose Baber, Levi Eckley, and R. W. Willis were commissioned in 1836 to find a place for what would become Macon's third cemetery (Fort Hill Cemetery and Old City Cemetery were the first and second, respectively.) The committee decided to establish the cemetery outside of the city because the land there was less expensive. As a horticulturist, Simri Rose was personally involved in deciding the location and type of trees and flowers. Rose Hill Cemetery was originally designed to be a garden cemetery with landscaping, similar to Mount Auburn Cemetery, as it was intended to function as both a cemetery and a local park. Dirt paths through the cemetery were intentionally wide enough to allow easy access for carriages. Two bridges were built across ravines to allow easy access to other parts of the cemetery.

== Cemetery sections ==
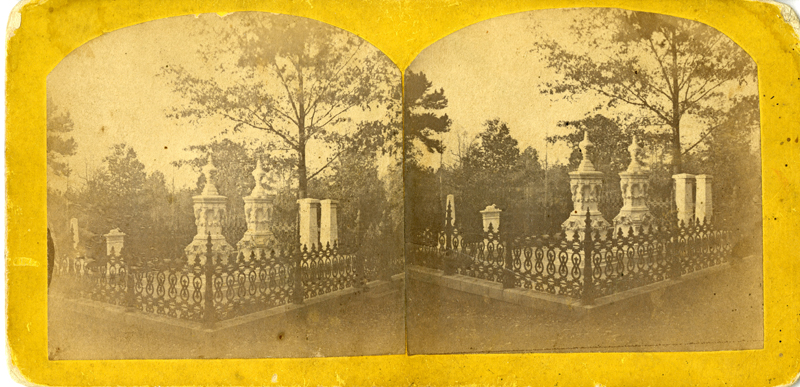
The Ross Lot within Rose Hill Cemetery, circa 1880s

The cemetery has one Catholic section for Saint Joseph's Catholic Church and seven Jewish sections: Hebrew Lot, Jew Lot, New Hebrew Lot, Polish Lot, Russian Lot, Sherah Israel, and William Wolff. Oak Ridge, a section within Rose Hill Cemetery that was created in 1851, is the final resting place for an unknown number of slaves. Soldier's Square holds around 600 Confederate troops.

== Current condition ==
Many factors contribute to the cemetery's change in appearance. Age and exposure to the elements weathered marble statues and tombstones. Most of the dirt paths were paved between 1927 and 1960. Overcrowding contributed to the change in appearance not only because more people were taking up more room, but because digging new graves would damage the roots of nearby trees. A tornado on March 13, 1954, also uprooted many trees. The addition of a railroad in 1881 cut off access to the Ocmulgee River and Interstate 16 added traffic noise.

The cemetery is part of a self-guided walking tour of Macon and is the site of the semi-annual Rose Hill Ramble sponsored by the Middle Georgia Historical Society.

== Notable interments ==
- Duane Allman
- Gregg Allman
- Clifford Anderson
- Augustus Octavius Bacon
- Charles Lafayette Bartlett
- John Birch
- James Henderson Blount
- Peter J. Bracken – engineer of stolen The Texas locomotive in the Great Locomotive Chase
- Alfred H. Colquitt
- Philip Cook
- Harry Stillwell Edwards
- Eugenia Tucker Fitzgerald
- Samuel Francis Gove
- LeRoy Wiley Gresham
- Thomas Hardeman Jr.
- Nathaniel Edwin Harris
- James Jackson – US Congressman, judge advocate in the American Civil War, and a chief justice of the Supreme Court of Georgia.
- Henry Graybill Lamar
- John Basil Lamar
- Buck Melton – Mayor of Macon, Georgia (1975–79)
- Elizabeth Reed Napier (1845–1935) – inspiration for the Allman Brothers song "In Memory of Elizabeth Reed"
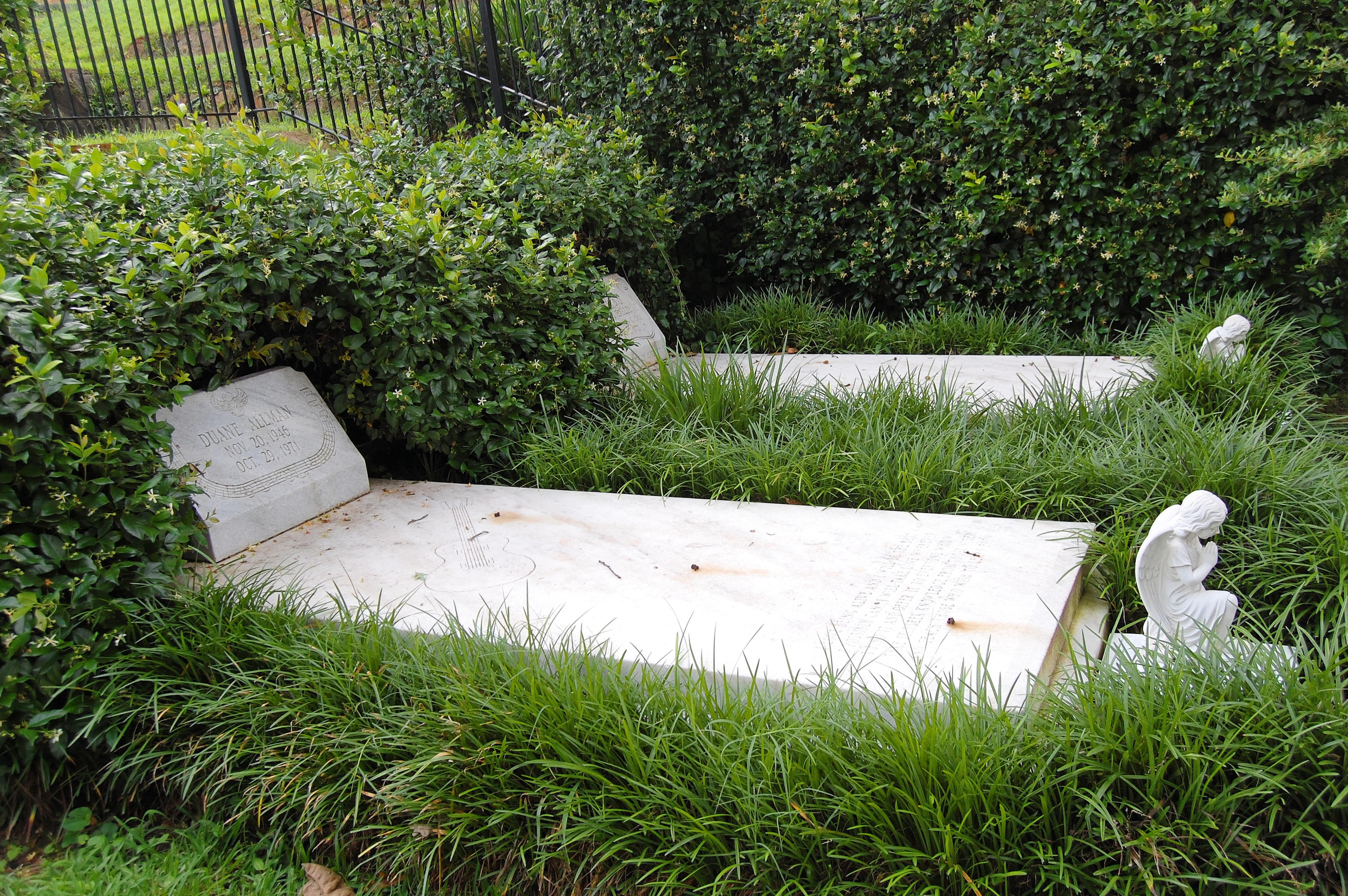
  Graves of Duane Allman and Berry Oakley
- Eugenius Aristides Nisbet
- Berry Oakley
- Helen Plane
- Oliver H. Prince
- J. Neel Reid
- Simri Rose – Rose Hill Cemetery's architect and designer
- George Washington Bonaparte Towns
- Edward D. Tracy
- Butch Trucks
- Phil Walden
- Blanton Winship – Major general of the United States Army, Judge Advocate General (1931–33), Governor of Puerto Rico (1934–39)

== Gallery ==
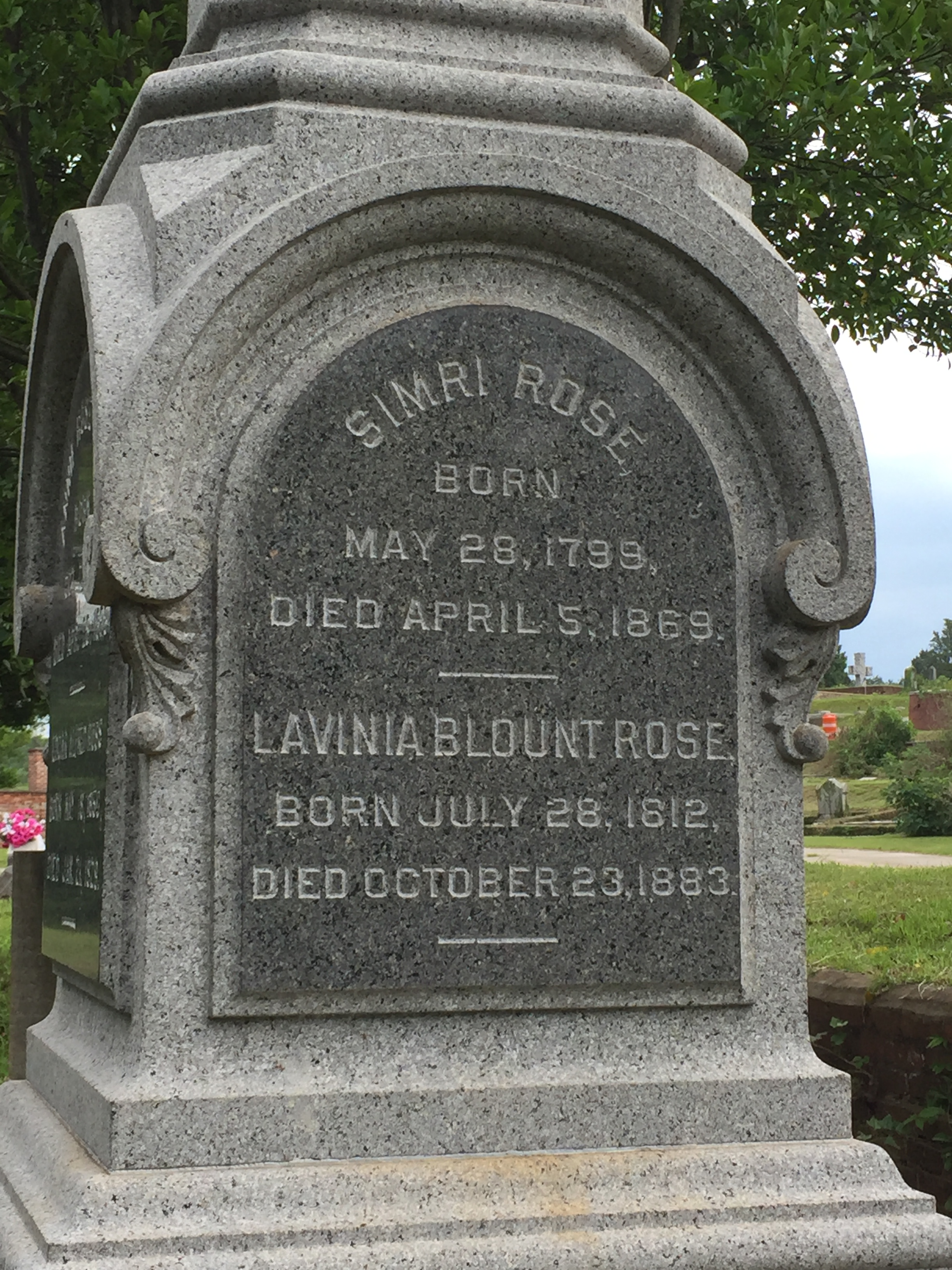
Simri Rose's monument

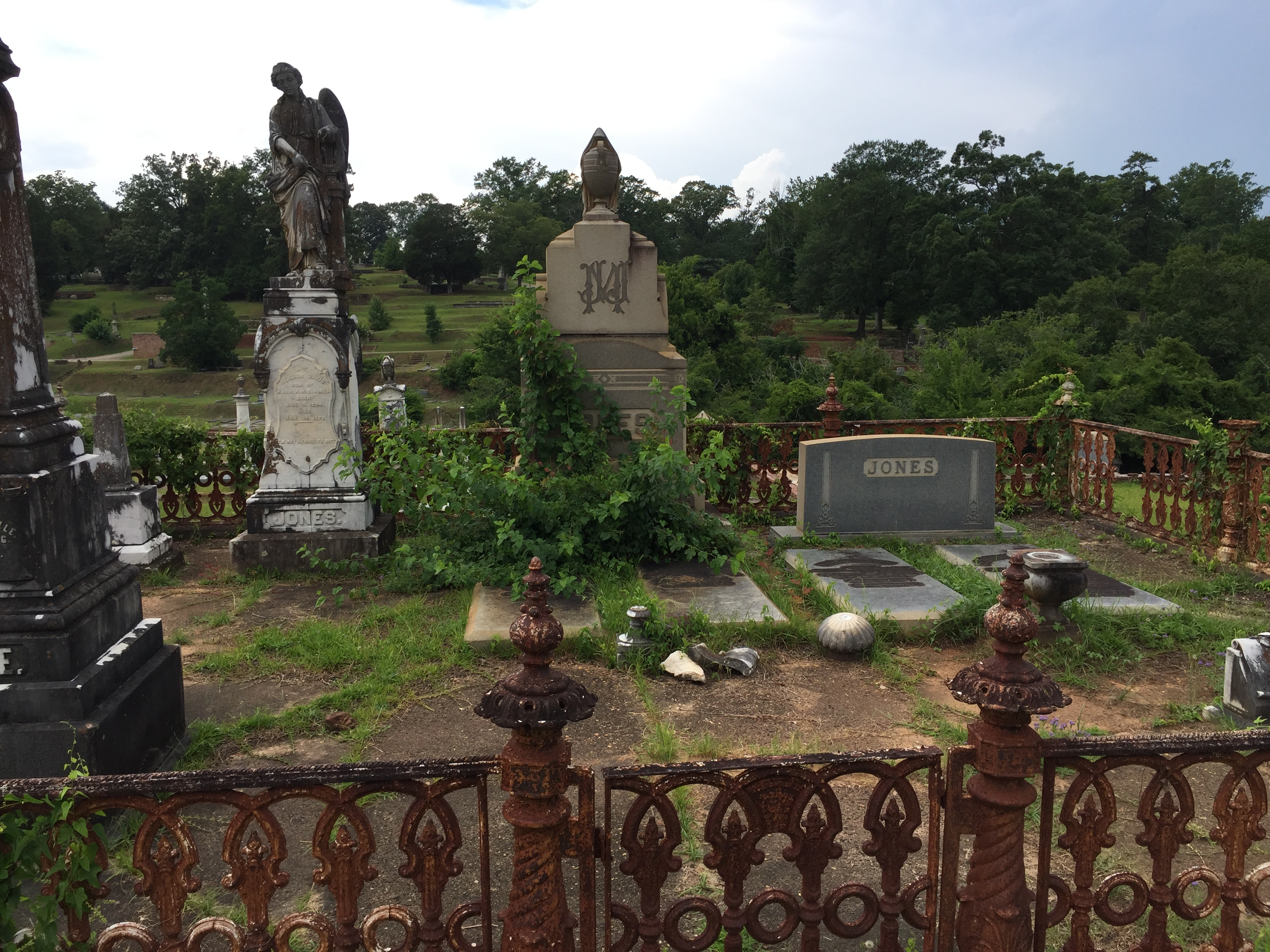
The Jones family plot

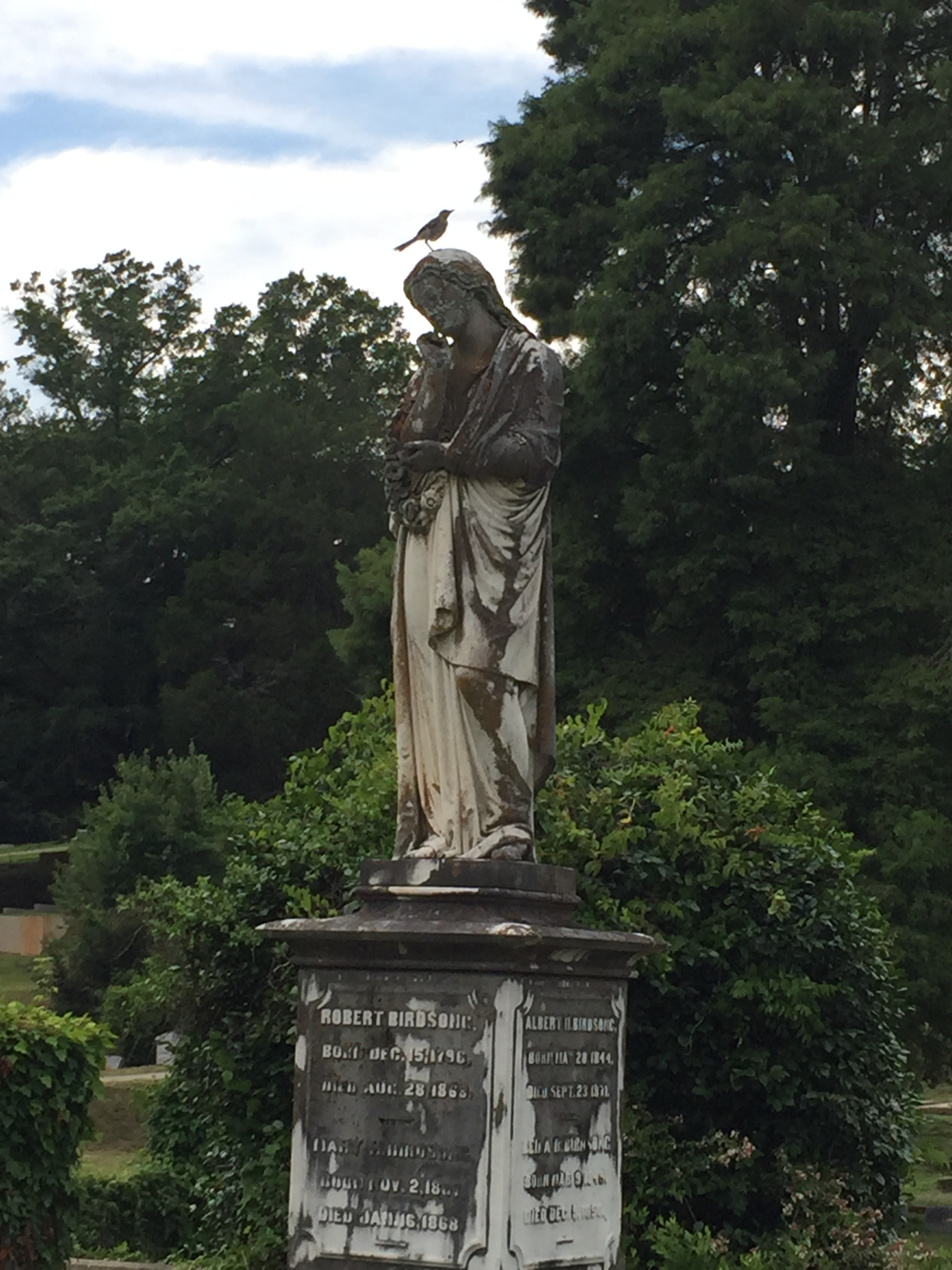
Robert Birdsong's monument

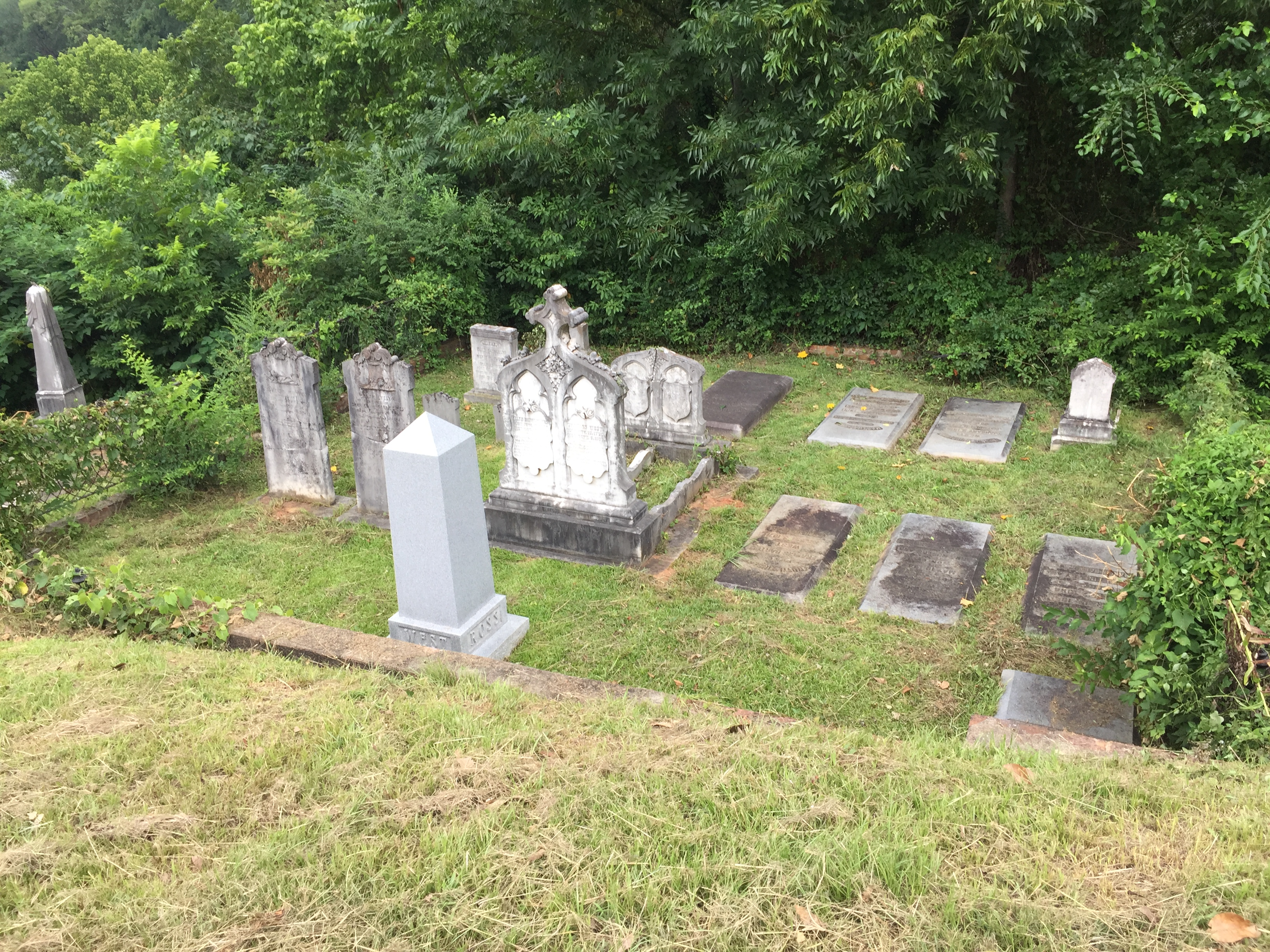
Ross/West family plot

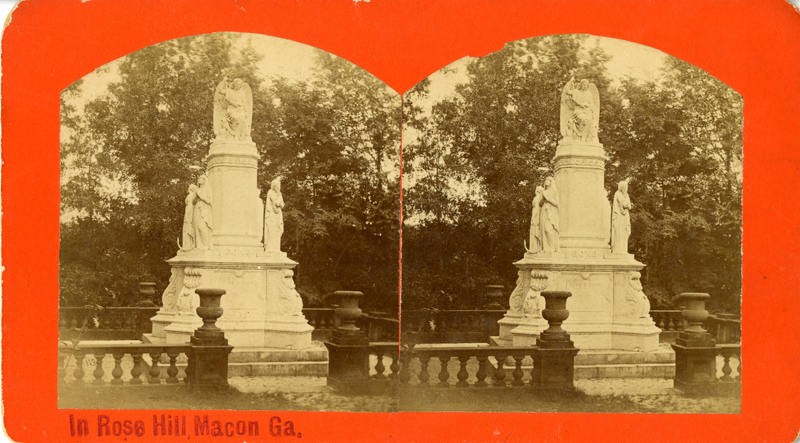
Bond family monument, circa 1877

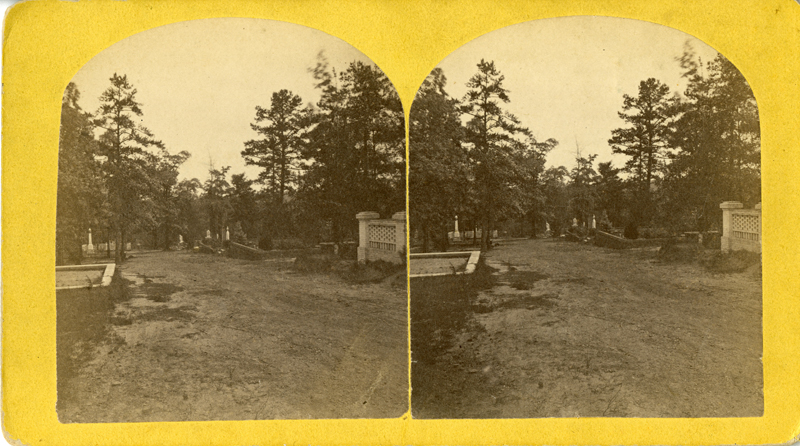
Central Avenue from gate, circa 1877

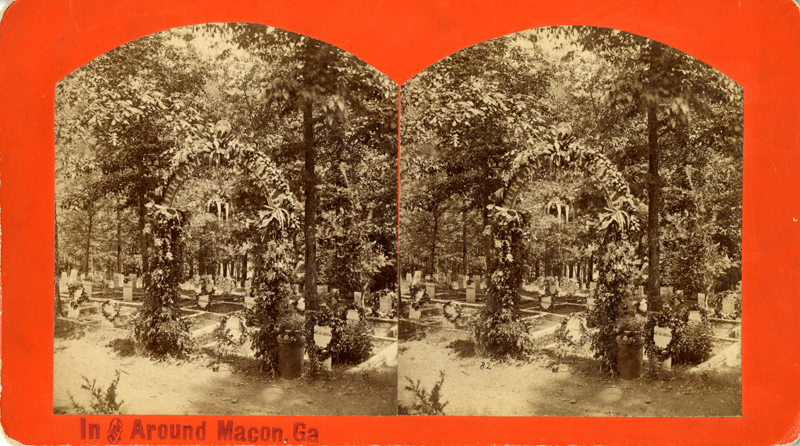
Rose Hill Cemetery, Confederate section, circa 1877

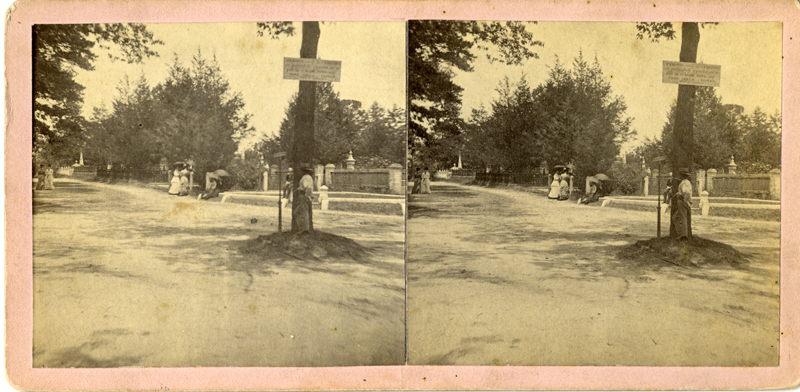
Rose Hill Cemetery from Central Ave., circa 1877

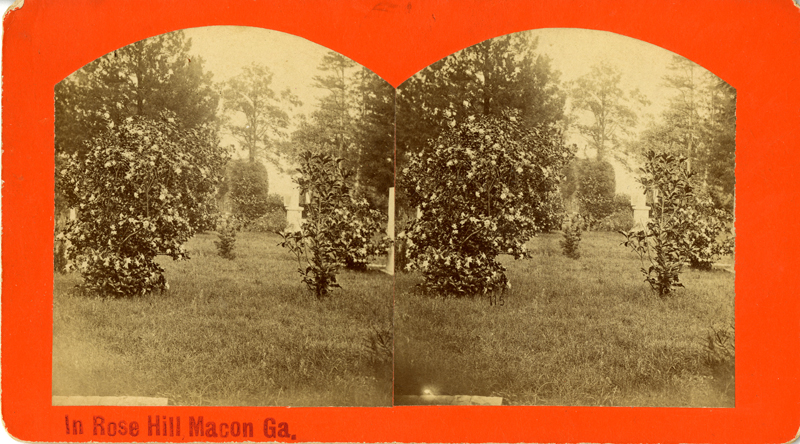
Rose Hill Cemetery, circa 1877

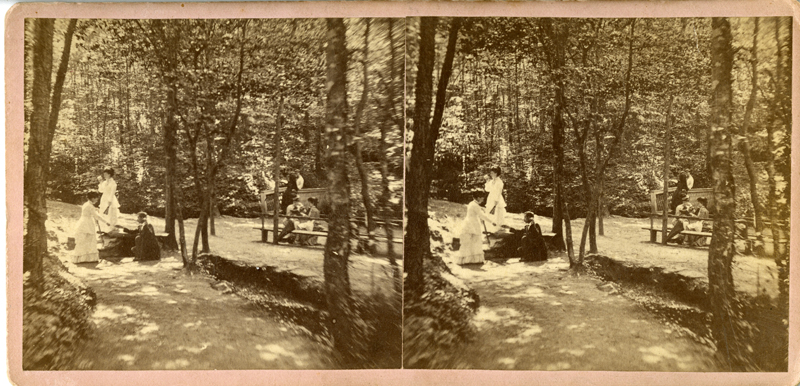
Rose Hill Cemetery, visitors' spring, circa 1877

== See also ==
- Riverside Cemetery (Macon, Georgia) – another historic cemetery immediately adjacent to Rose Hill
