= Old City Cemetery (Macon, Georgia) =

Historic cemetery in Macon, Bibb County, Georgia

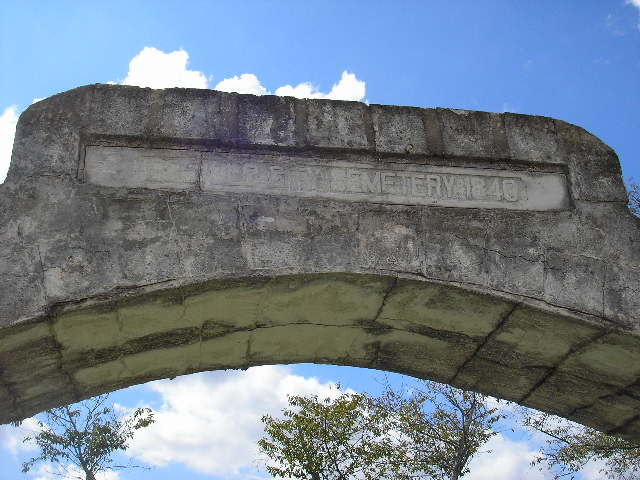
- Part of the cemetery's entry arch (2015)
- Interactive map of Old City Cemetery

Details
- Established: 1825
- Location: Macon, Georgia
- Country: United States
- Coordinates: 32°49′53″N 83°37′20″W
- Type: City
- Owned by: Macon–Bibb County
- Find a Grave: Old City Cemetery
- Old City Cemetery
- U.S. Historic district – Contributing property
- Part of: Macon Railroad Industrial District (ID87000977)
- Designated CP: June 12, 1987

The Old City Cemetery is a small cemetery located in Macon, Georgia, United States. Established in 1825, it saw burials until the 1840s, when Rose Hill Cemetery, a much larger cemetery in the city, opened. Following this, the cemetery fell into ruins, and following failed efforts in the late 1800s to convert the area to a public park, the cemetery was restored in the 1970s. The cemetery is located in the Macon Railroad Industrial District, which is listed on the National Register of Historic Places.

== History ==
The 4-acre (1.6-hectare) cemetery was established in 1825, just southeast of what is today downtown Macon, Georgia. Referred to as "God's Acre" by Maconites, individuals interred at the cemetery include a major from the American Revolutionary War and the daughter of Jared Irwin, a Governor of Georgia. By the 1830s, however, the city council of Macon feared that the City Cemetery would soon become inadequate for Macon's needs, and appointed a commission to establish Rose Hill Cemetery, likely the first rural cemetery in the Southern United States. This much larger cemetery opened in 1840 and quickly became the main burial place for the city. The last burial to take place at the Old City Cemetery occurred a few years later in 1843.

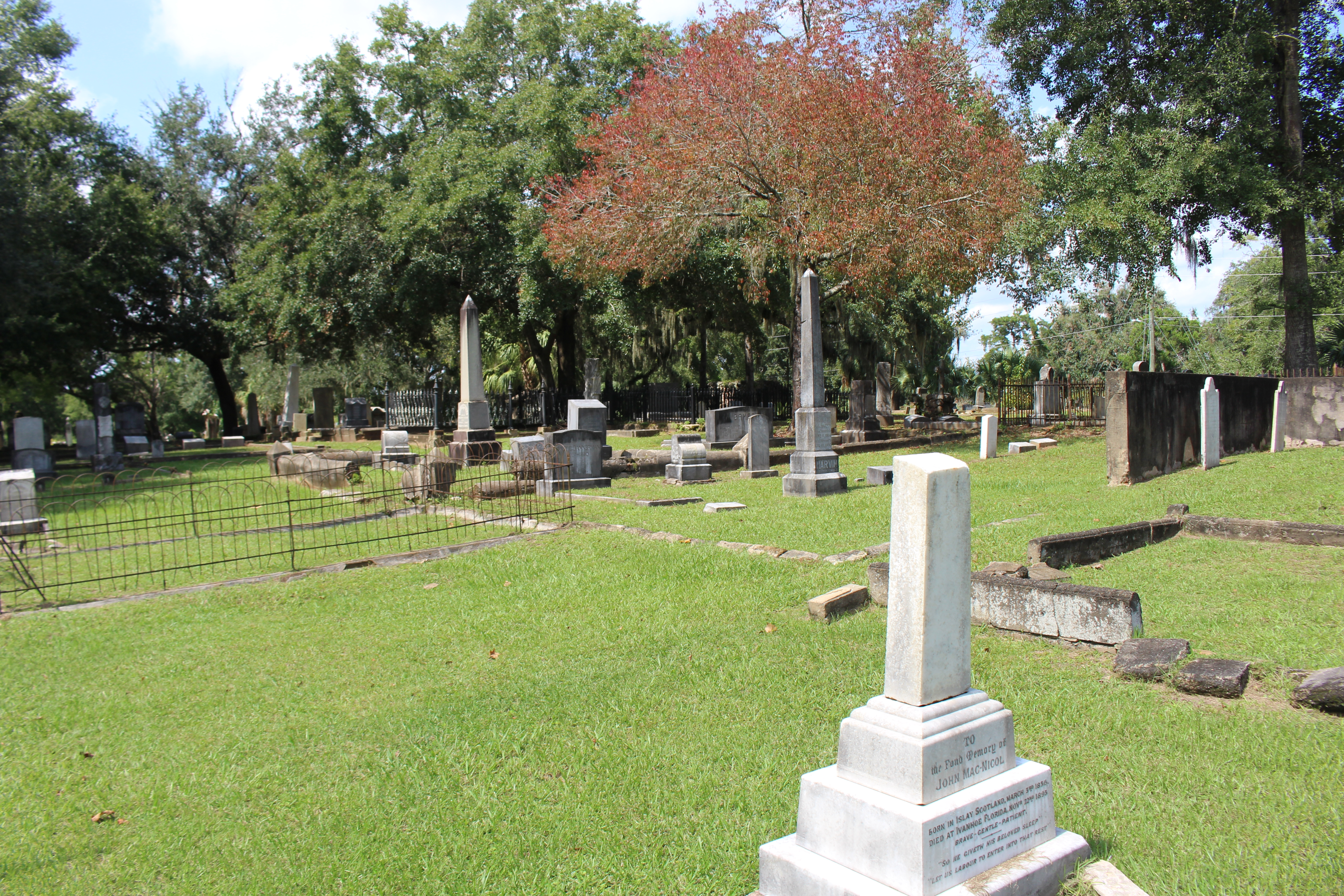
Gravestones within the cemetery

Following this, the cemetery fell into ruins, with an 1891 article in The Telegraph describing it as “a wilderness, a ruined necropolis, the habitation only of dogs and vermin; the wasteland in the slums of a city.” That same year, the Macon city council began to exhume the hundreds of bodies that were buried in the cemetery, with the intent of converting the cemetery to a public park called "Founder's Park" that would feature a monument describing the cemetery. However, these plans never came to fruition. In 1914, the fire department put out a fire at the cemetery, caused by sparks from a passing streetcar.

Throughout the 20th century, local churches and organizations such as the Daughters of the American Revolution performed upkeep and repairs to the city-owned cemetery, which underwent a restoration in the 1970s.
