= Helen Plane =

American white nationalist

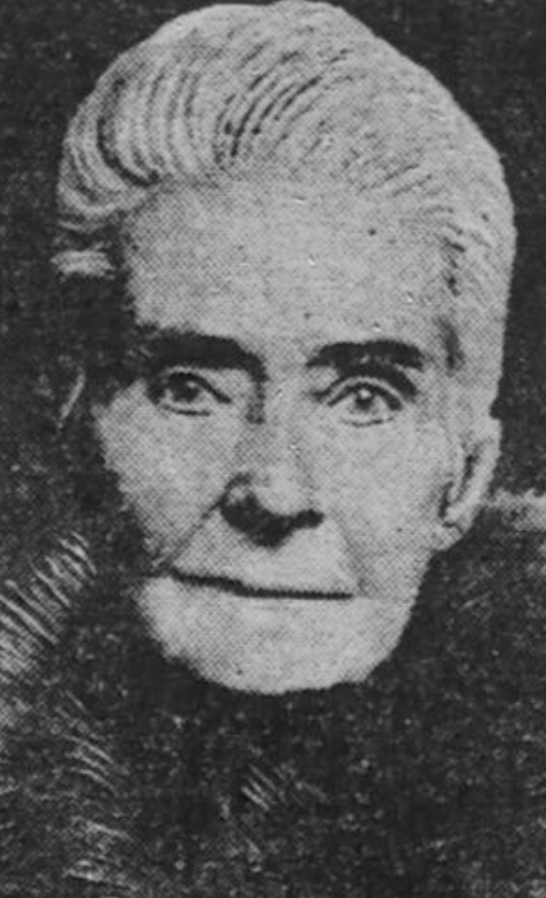

President of the Georgia State Division, United Daughters of the Confederacy

Personal details
- Born: Caroline Helen Jemison; 1829 Tuscaloosa County, Alabama, U.S.
- Died: 1925 (aged 95–96) Atlanta, Georgia, U.S.
- Resting place: Rose Hill Cemetery
- Spouse: William F. Plane

Caroline Helen Jemison Plane (1829–1925), more commonly known as Helen Pane, was an American clubwoman, socialite, and white supremacist. She was a vocal supporter of the Ku Klux Klan and a charter member of the United Daughters of the Confederacy (UDC), serving as president of the UDC's chapter in Atlanta, Georgia and as the first president of the Georgia State Division UDC. Plane was instrumental in organizing the creation of the Confederate Memorial Carving at Stone Mountain.

== United Daughters of the Confederacy ==
Plane was a charter member of the United Daughters of the Confederacy and served as president of the Atlanta Chapter and served as the first president and honorary life president of the Georgia State Division UDC.

Inspired by William Terrell and John Temple Graves, she started promoting an idea for a Confederate Memorial Carving at Stone Mountain in 1914. She obtained approval from the Georgia Division UDC to set up the Stone Mountain Memorial Association in 1914. Plane convinced Samuel Venable of the Venable Brothers Granite Company, an active Ku Klux Klan member and owner of the mountain, to deed one side of the mountain for the Confederate memorial project. She hired the sculptor Gutzon Borglum for the project. Despite Borglum's involvement with the Klan, Plane refused to shake his hand as he was "a Yankee". When Borglum arrived in Atlanta, Plane took him to her family's summer home, Mont Rest, near Stone Mountain, where she introduced him to Venable.

A supporter of the Klan, Plane suggested in a letter to Borglum:

I feel it is due to the Klan[,] which saved us from Negro dominations [sic] and carpetbag rule, that it be immortalized on Stone Mountain. Why not represent a small group of them in their nightly uniform approaching in the distance?

== Personal life and death ==
She was married to Captain William F. Plane, a Confederate officer. Her husband was killed while leading a company of the 6th Georgia Infantry at the Battle of Antietam in Maryland.

She died in 1925. Her funeral was held at St. Mark's Methodist Church and she was buried at Rose Hill Cemetery in Macon, Georgia.

== Bibliography ==
- Freeman, David (1997). Carved in Stone: The History of Stone Mountain. Mercer University Press. ISBN 9780865545472.
