= James W. Wise =

American politician (1868–1925)

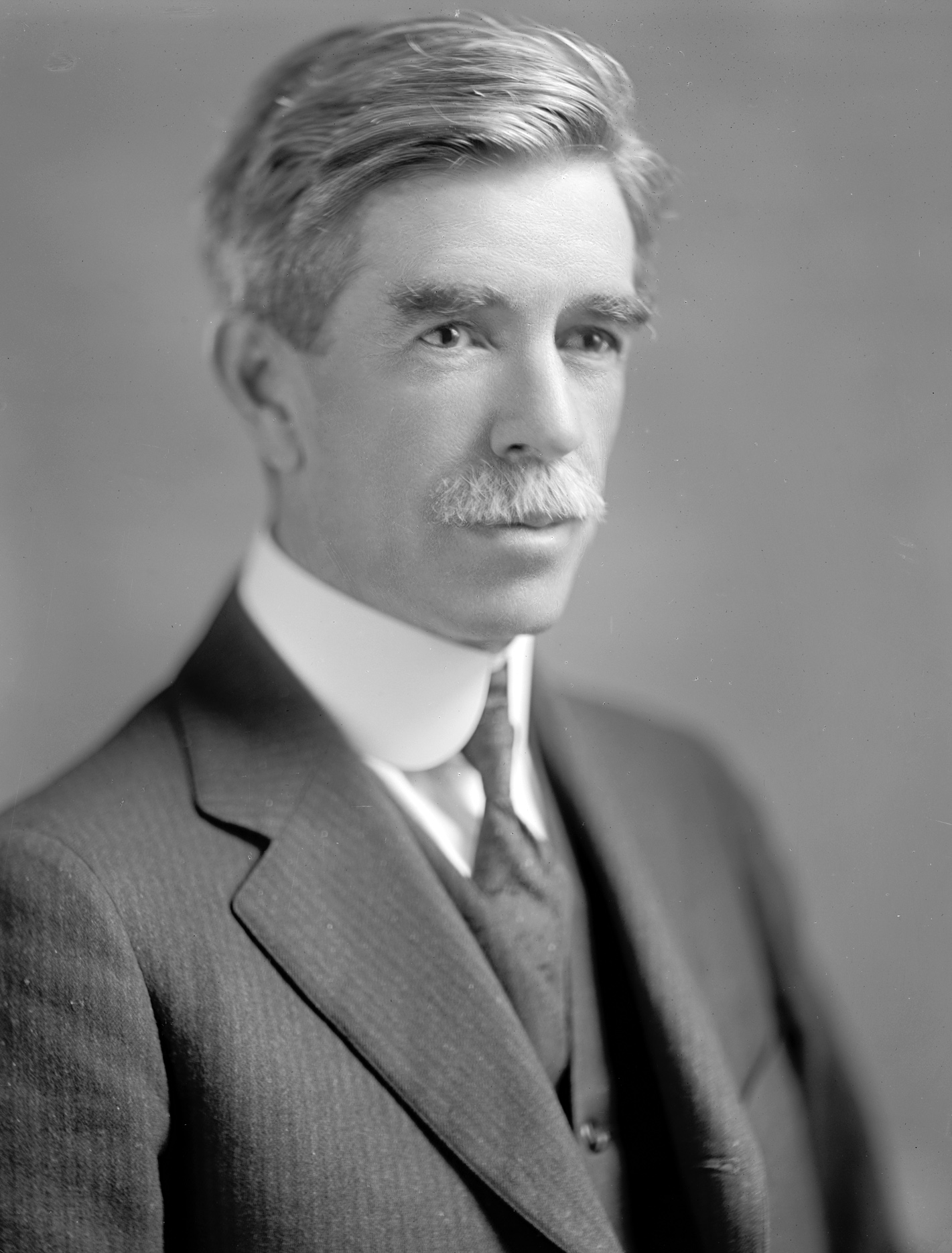

Member of the U.S. House of Representatives from Georgia's 6th district
- In office March 4, 1915 – March 3, 1925
- Preceded by: Charles Lafayette Bartlett
- Succeeded by: Samuel Rutherford

Member of the Georgia House of Representatives
- In office 1902–1908

Personal details
- Born: March 3, 1868 McDonough, Henry County, Georgia
- Died: September 8, 1925 (aged 57) Atlanta, Georgia
- Party: Democratic
- Education: Emory College
- Occupation: Lawyer

James Walter Wise (March 3, 1868 – September 8, 1925) was a U.S. Representative from Georgia.

Born near McDonough, Henry County, Georgia, Wise attended the common schools. He studied law at Emory College in Oxford, Georgia. He was admitted to the bar in 1892 and commenced practice in Fayetteville, Georgia, in January 1893. He served as member of the State house of representatives in 1902–1908. He was mayor of Fayetteville in 1904–1906. He served as solicitor general of the Flint judicial circuit in 1908–1912.

Wise was elected as a Democrat to the 64th and to the four succeeding Congresses (March 4, 1915 – March 3, 1925). Due to a prolonged illness, he was unable to qualify for or attend the 68th Congress. He declined to be a candidate for renomination in 1924. He died in Atlanta, Georgia, on September 8, 1925. He was interred in McDonough Cemetery, McDonough, Georgia.

U.S. House of Representatives
Preceded by Charles L. Bartlett	Member of the U.S. House of Representatives from Georgia's 6th congressional district March 4, 1915 – March 3, 1925	Succeeded by Samuel Rutherford
