= Samaria (Mitcham) Bailey =

American activist

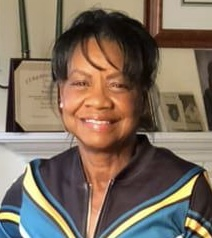
- Born: Samaria R. Mitcham; June 29, 1947 (age 78); Macon, Georgia, U.S.
- Spouse: Alphonso Bailey
- Children: 4, including Joycine Guerra, Alexis Bailey, Kimberly Johnson, and Alyse Bailey
- Parent(s): Wilbur Mitcham and Annie Mae Leonard

Samaria (Mitcham) Bailey is an African-American woman who is known as an instrumental figure in the civil rights movement. Bailey was one of the first to began desegregation at A. L. Miller Senior High School, an all-white female school located in Macon, Georgia. She would go on to become one of the first African American women accepted to Mercer University. She later became an accomplished pianist, and her story was adapted into a bestselling novel and a stage play. Samaria is the elder sister of Lydia M. Meredith, author of “The Gay Preacher’s Wife”. The Oprah Winfrey Network (OWN), featured the story for which her book was based in the series, Unlocked: Family Secrets”.

== Early life ==
She attended a traditionally black — and therefore coed — institution.

== Desegregating Miller High School ==
I wanted to see if I was really as smart as they said I was.

— Samaria Bailey, (Campbell 2002, p. 110)

Samaria was one of the only nonwhite students at Miller High. Still, Samaria was regarded as a good and intelligent young woman, and graduated with honors.

=== Tutoring Program ===
Based on Samaria's experiences, Hendricks improved the tutoring program, recruiting students from as far as UCLA to help teach. The following summer (1965), the tutorial program attracted close to 100 students.

== Desegregating Mercer University ==
Samaria was then admitted to Mercer University, the first such African American woman. At Mercer, Samaria continued to endure racist remarks from her peers on a daily basis. Most students ignored her, avoiding eye contact, and even some professors treated her like a nonentity. In her chemistry class, she was the only female pupil, and the professor had to force another student to be her lab partner. The mistreatment, however, did not stop Samaria from pursuing her education. She notes, "I've never been a quitter."

During her time at Mercer, Samaria continued to perform as a pianist. She was offered recording contracts with several music labels, but rejected them to continue pursuing her education.

== Later life and occupation ==
After graduation, Bailey started Med-Tech Service, a medical technologies company. Med-Tech Service employed forty to fifty people, provided nurses, technicians, and other health- care providers throughout the Macon area. Samaria has described her ideology as follows: "I was never a separatist. I was never a black militant. I just always wanted to get the job done." Indeed, ninety percent of her employees were white. As of 2014, Samaria Bailey resided with her husband in Macon, Georgia.
