= Edward D. Tracy =

American Confederate Army officer (1833–1863)

Edward Dorr Tracy, Jr.
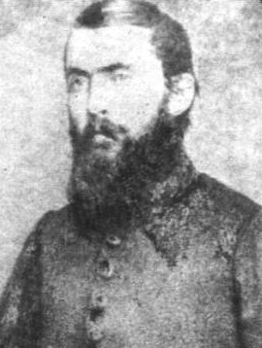
- Edward Dorr Tracy, Jr.
- Born: November 3, 1833; Macon, Georgia, US
- Died: May 1, 1863 (aged 29); Port Gibson, Mississippi, US
- Burial place: Rose Hill Cemetery (Macon, Georgia)
- Relatives: Hattie C. Tracy (daughter)
- Military career
- Allegiance: Confederate States of America
- Branch: Confederate States Army
- Service years: 1861–63
- Rank: Brigadier General
- Conflicts: American Civil War: First Battle of Bull Run; Battle of Shiloh; Battle of Chickasaw Bayou; Battle of Port Gibson †

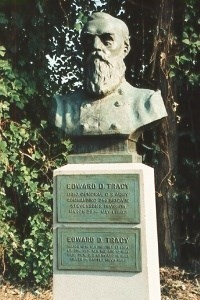
Bronze bust of Brig. Gen. Edward D. Tracy by Solon Borglum at Vicksburg National Military Park, 1913

Edward Dorr Tracy Jr. (November 3, 1833 – May 1, 1863) was a brigadier general of the Confederate States Army during the American Civil War. After serving in Virginia and Eastern Tennessee, he was killed at the Battle of Port Gibson which was part of the Vicksburg Campaign.

== Biography ==
Tracy was born in Macon, Georgia on November 5, 1833. Prior to the war, he was a lawyer. He moved to Huntsville, Alabama in the late 1850s.

At the start of the Civil War, he was a captain for a company in the 4th Alabama Infantry Regiment. The regiment fought at the First Battle of Bull Run. On October 12, 1861, Tracy was appointed lieutenant colonel of the 19th Alabama Infantry Regiment and was transferred to the Western Theater. He had a horse killed under him at the Battle of Shiloh. He was commissioned as a brigadier general on August 16, 1862.

Tracy was killed at the Battle of Port Gibson, Mississippi on May 1, 1863. He was buried at Rose Hill Cemetery in Macon, GA.

== See also ==
- List of American Civil War generals (Confederate)
