= Ozella Shields Head =

American novelist

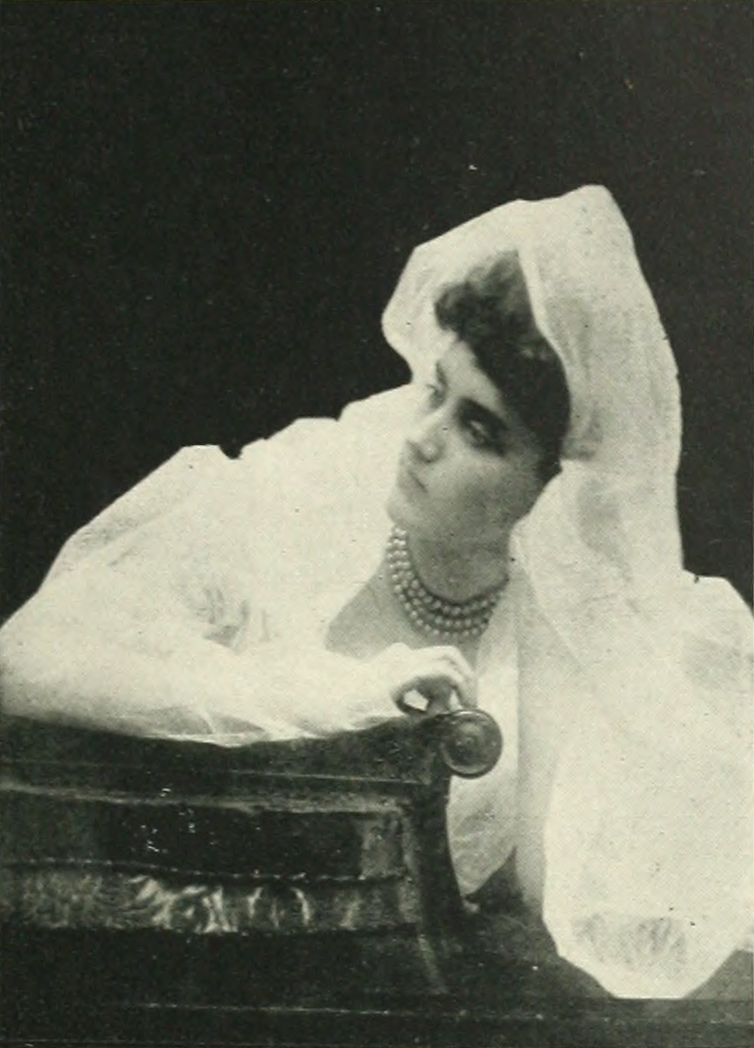
"A Woman of the Century"

Mary Ozella Shields Head (October 19, 1869 – May 16, 1948) was an American writer.

== Biography ==
Mary Ozella Shields was born in Macon, Georgia, on October 19, 1869, to Adolphus A. Shields, a butcher, and Mary Anne Westcott. She was educated in Atlanta, Georgia.

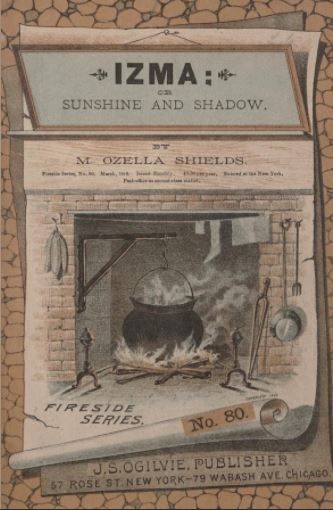
Izma, or Sunshine and Shadow

Her taste for literature and her talent for production were shown in childhood, when she wrote a number of love stories. Her first published work, a sensational love story of thirty chapters, was "Sundered Hearts." published in the Philadelphia Saturday Night, when Shields was eighteen years old. Her next works were "Verona's Mistake" and "A Sinless Crime," published in the same journal. Other stories followed in quick succession. In 1889 she brought out her "Izma, or Sunshine and Shadow" through a New York house.

In November 1889, she married Daniel B. Head, of Greenville, Mississippi, and had one son, Dan.

She died in Los Angeles in 1948.
