= Lydia Meredith =

Author and community advocate

Lydia Mitcham Meredith
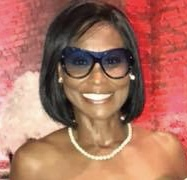

Personal details
- Born: May 3, 1952
- Occupation: Author and CEO

Lydia Mitcham Meredith (born May 3, 1952) is an American author and the former CEO of the Renaissance Learning Center (RLC) in Atlanta, Georgia.

== Early life and education ==
Meredith is the fifth of thirteen children born to Wilbur Mitcham and Annie M. Mitcham.

She was one of the first Black students to integrate the all-white Lasseter High School in Macon, Georgia. She was the first cheerleader for Mark Smith High School, their all-white male counterpart. She graduated from Lasseter High School with honors.

Meredith was accepted at Vanderbilt University in 1970 and graduated with a BS in industrial engineering. She was Vanderbilt University's first cheerleader of African American descent in 1972. She earned her MBA from Vanderbilt's Owen Graduate School of Management. She also holds master's degrees in Christian education and public policy from the Morehouse School of Religion and Georgia State University-Andrew Young School of Policy Studies, respectively. Dr. Meredith earned her PhD in English with a concentration in rhetoric and composition from Georgia State University.

== Career ==
Meredith is a community organizer, entrepreneur and civil rights activist. She formerly operated an early childhood development center in downtown Atlanta, Georgia.

Meredith led the daily operations of the Renaissance Learning Center (RLC) operating in the 4th Ward community of Atlanta. Ninety-five percent of the students assisted by the RLC were from impoverished homes. Teen Talk, a program within their curriculum, educated over 2,000 teenagers on life skills. The RLC graduated over 3,000 students into kindergarten. The RLC helped 2,500 school-age children get promoted to the next grade, with 100% of them going on to high school. Five hundred children and adults were impacted daily by the RLC. Fifteen thousand families have been elevated out of poverty because of services rendered to them by the Renaissance Learning Center.

She is the author of the novel The Gay Preacher's Wife. The Oprah Winfrey Network (OWN) featured the story on which her book was based in the series Unlocked: Family Secrets.

== Awards and recognition ==
Meredith was acknowledged for her work in the community by former governor of Georgia Roy Barnes. The RLC was presented with the Childhood Hero Award for the service rendered to the youth of the community.
