= Thomas Banks Cabaniss =

American politician (1835–1915)

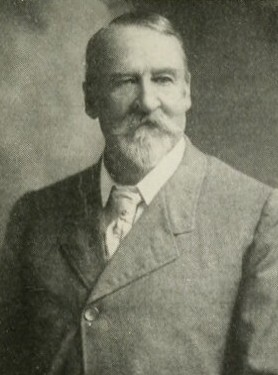

Personal details
- Born: August 31, 1835 Forsyth, Georgia, U.S.
- Died: August 14, 1915 (aged 79) Forsyth, Georgia, U.S.
- Resting place: Oakland Cemetery, Forsyth, Georgia, U.S.
- Party: Democratic
- Relatives: Thomas C. McRae (cousin)
- Education: Penfield College; University of Georgia
- Occupation: Politician, lawyer

Military service
- Allegiance: Confederate States of America
- Branch/service: Confederate States Army
- Battles/wars: American Civil War

Thomas Banks Cabaniss (August 31, 1835 – August 14, 1915) was a United States representative from Georgia. He was a lawyer in Forsyth, Georgia, and served in the Georgia House of Representatives and Georgia Senate.

== Early life and education ==
Born in Forsyth, Georgia, he attended private schools and Penfield College (now Mercer University), graduated from the University of Georgia in 1853, studied law, and was admitted to the bar in 1861.

== Military service ==
He entered the Confederate States Army on April 1, 1861, and served throughout the Civil War, after which he returned to Forsyth and commenced the practice of law.

== Political career ==
He was a member of the Georgia House of Representatives from 1865 to 1867 and was appointed assistant secretary of the Georgia State Senate in 1870 and secretary in 1873. He resigned to become Solicitor General of the Flint circuit, which office he held until 1877; he served in the Georgia Senate from 1878 to 1880 and 1884 to 1886.

Cabaniss was elected as a Democrat to the Fifty-third United States Congress, serving from March 4, 1893, to March 3, 1895; he was an unsuccessful candidate for renomination in 1894, and was appointed a member of the Dawes Commission to adjust affairs in the Indian Territory. He was mayor of Forsyth in 1910 and judge of the city court in 1913 and 1914.

== Death ==
He died in Forsyth in 1915; interment was in Forsyth's Oakland Cemetery.

== Family ==
Cabaniss' cousin, Thomas Chipman McRae of Arkansas, was also a U.S. Representative.

U.S. House of Representatives
Preceded by James Henderson Blount	U.S. Representative of Georgia's 6th congressional district March 4, 1893 – March 3, 1895	Succeeded by Charles Lafayette Bartlett
