= Charles L. Bartlett (Georgia politician) =

American politician (1853–1938)

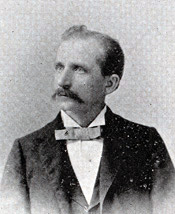

Member of the U.S. House of Representatives from Georgia's 6th district
- In office March 4, 1895 – March 3, 1915
- Preceded by: Thomas Banks Cabaniss
- Succeeded by: James W. Wise

Member of the Georgia Senate
- In office 1888-1889

Member of the Georgia House of Representatives
- In office 1882-1885

Personal details
- Born: January 31, 1853 Monticello, Georgia
- Died: April 21, 1938 (aged 85) Macon, Georgia
- Party: Democratic
- Education: University of Georgia; University of Virginia; UGA School of Law
- Occupation: Lawyer

Charles Lafayette Bartlett (January 31, 1853 – April 21, 1938) was an American politician. A member of the Democratic Party, he served as a United States representative from Georgia from 1895 to 1915.

== Early years and education ==
Bartlett was born in Monticello, Georgia. He graduated in 1870 with a Bachelor of Arts from the University of Georgia (UGA) in Athens. While at UGA, he was a member of the Phi Kappa Literary Society. He then studied law at the University of Virginia before graduating from the UGA School of Law with a Bachelor of Laws degree in 1872, gaining admission to the state bar, and beginning the practice of law in Monticello.

== Political career ==
After moving to Macon, Georgia in 1875, Bartlett became the solicitor general for the Macon judicial circuit in 1877 and remained in that position until 1881. He was then elected to the Georgia State House of Representatives from 1882 through 1885.

Barlett served as city attorney of Macon from 1887 until 1892 while also serving in the Georgia Senate in 1888 and 1889. In 1892, he became a Macon circuit superior court judge and served in that position until resigning in 1894 to successfully run for the United States House of Representatives, a position he held for nine more terms until deciding not to run for re-election in 1914.

== Later years ==
After his congressional service, Bartlett returned to Macon to practice law and engage in banking. He died there in 1938 and was buried in its Rose Hill Cemetery.

U.S. House of Representatives
Preceded by Thomas B. Cabaniss	Member of the U.S. House of Representatives from Georgia's 6th congressional district March 4, 1895 – March 4, 1915	Succeeded by James W. Wise
