= Wilbur Mitcham =

American chef (1923–2003)

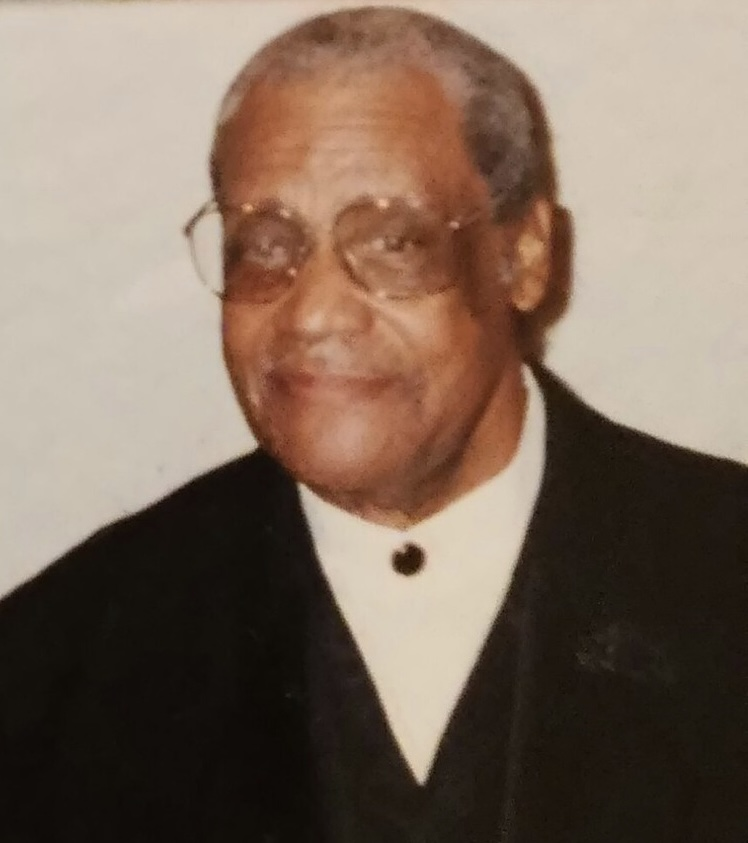
- Wilbur “Chef” Mitcham
- Born: December 10, 1923
- Died: June 15, 2003 (aged 79); Georgia, U.S.
- Spouse: Annie Mae Leonard Mitcham
- Culinary career
- Previous restaurant
- Len Berg's (1943–2003)
- Military career
- Allegiance: United States
- Branch: U.S. Army

Wilbur Mitcham (December 10, 1923 - June 15, 2003) was an American chef.

== Early life ==
Mitcham briefly served in the U.S. Army as a field artilleryman during World War II but was medically discharged for health reasons. Upon his discharge from the Army he went to New York City. In New York, he studied cooking under an Asian chef.

== Career ==
Mitcham returned to Macon and landed a position as a short order cook with Len Berg's Restaurant in 1943. "Chef", as he was affectionately known by his constituents and friends, served as the senior chef cook of Len Berg's Restaurant for over 60 years until he took ill. He cooked for Ben Hogan, Sam Snead and Joe Dimaggio.

== Personal life ==
Mitcham was married to Annie Mae Leonard for over 60 years, and together they raised eleven children: Patricia A. Mitcham, Ernest Tobias (nephew), Samaria (Mitcham) Bailey, Cozy L. Mitcham, Wilhelmina Mitcham, Lydia Meredith, Mary L. Mitcham, Zachery S. Mitcham, Wilma F. Mitcham, Charlotte B. Mitcham, and Julia M. Mitcham. He also fathered two additional children, a daughter, Laverne Patterson, and a son, Eric Jackson. Mitcham died on Father's Day in 2003.

Mitcham is featured in the book Remembering Len Berg's Restaurant.
