= Samuel Rutherford (Georgia politician) =

American politician

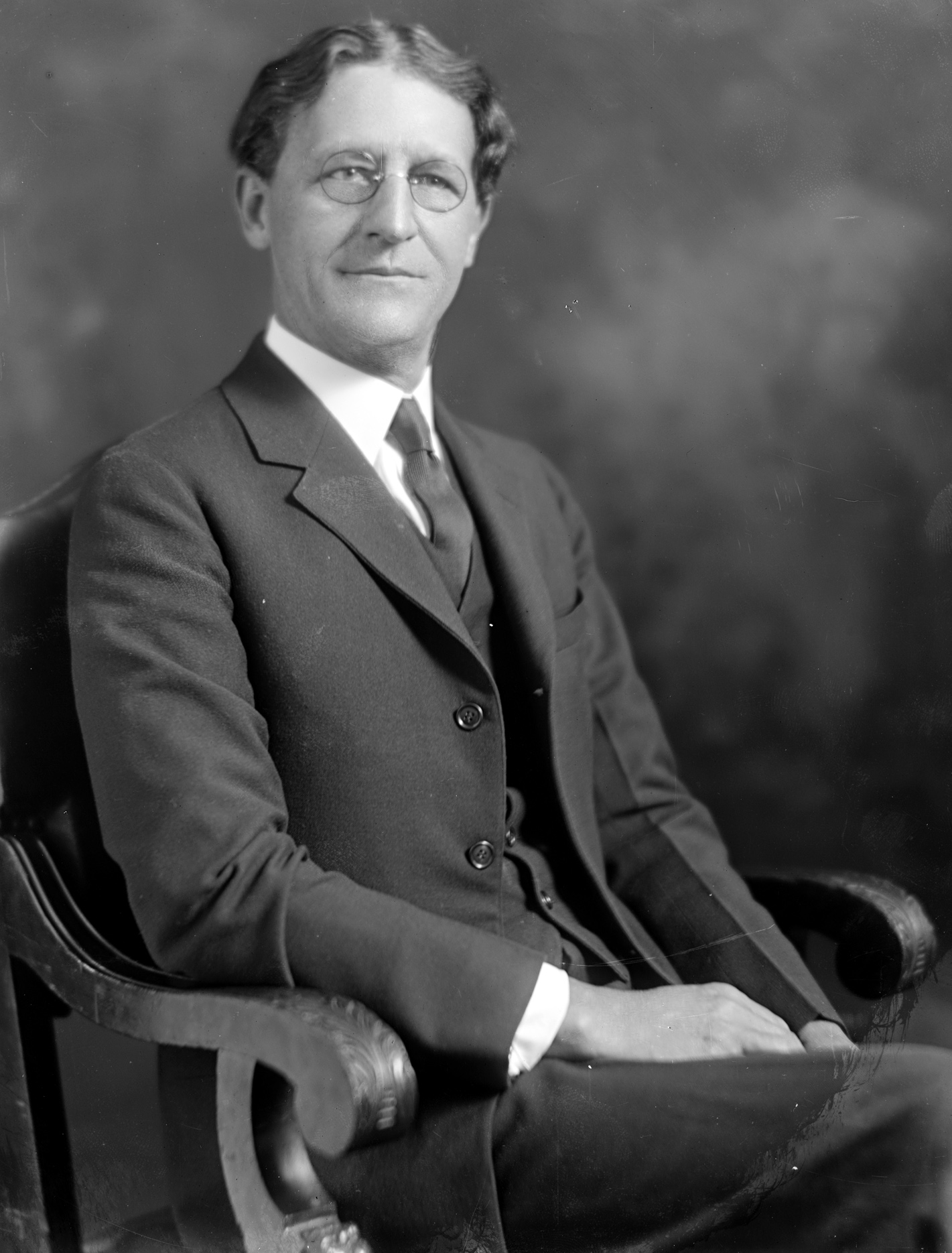

Member of the U.S. House of Representatives from Georgia's 6th district
- In office March 4, 1925 – February 4, 1932
- Preceded by: James Walter Wise
- Succeeded by: Carlton Mobley

Member of the Georgia Senate
- In office 1909-1910

Member of the Georgia House of Representatives
- In office 1896-1897; 1921-1924

Personal details
- Born: March 15, 1870 Culloden, Georgia, U.S.
- Died: February 4, 1932 (aged 61) Washington, D.C., U.S.
- Party: Democratic
- Education: Washington and Lee University; University of Georgia School of Law
- Occupation: Lawyer

Samuel Rutherford (March 15, 1870 – February 4, 1932) was an American politician, businessman, jurist and lawyer.

Rutherford was born near Culloden, Georgia in 1870, attended Washington and Lee University in Lexington, Virginia and graduated from the University of Georgia School of Law in Athens in 1894 with a Bachelor of Laws (B.L.) degree. He was admitted to the bar the same year and began practicing law in Forsyth, Georgia.

After serving as Mayor of Forsyth for three consecutive years, Rutherford served in the Georgia House of Representatives in 1896 and 1897. He then became the solicitor of the city court of Forsyth from 1898 to 1900. He returned to the Georgia General Assembly in 1909 and 1910 as a State Senator.

Rutherford began practicing of law again as well as farming. From 1921 to 1924, he returned to the Georgia House of Representatives. In 1925, he was elected as Democratic representative of Georgia's 6th congressional district in the 69th United States Congress. He was reelected to that seat for three additional terms (70th, 71st and 72nd Congresses) and served from March 4, 1925, until his death from a heart attack in Washington, D.C., while in office on February 4, 1932. He was buried in Oakland Cemetery in Forsyth.

== See also ==
- Politics of Georgia (U.S. state)
- List of members of the United States Congress who died in office (1900–1949)

U.S. House of Representatives
Preceded by James Walter Wise	Member of the U.S. House of Representatives from Georgia's 6th congressional district March 4, 1925 – February 4, 1932	Succeeded by Carlton Mobley
