= LeRoy Wiley Gresham =

American diarist

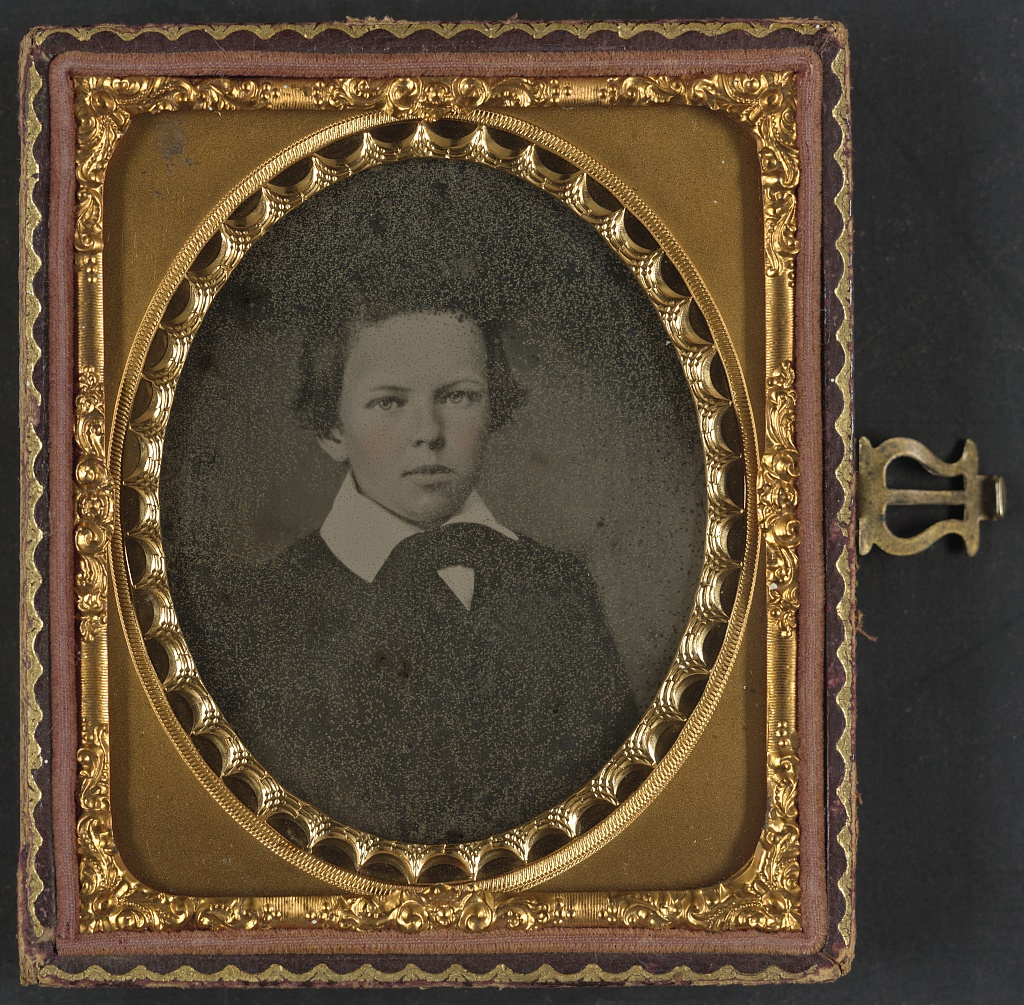
- LeRoy Wiley Gresham, approx. 1857
- Born: November 11, 1847; Macon, Georgia, U.S.
- Died: June 18, 1865 (aged 17)

LeRoy Wiley Gresham (November 11, 1847 – June 18, 1865) was an American diarist during the American Civil War. His journals are the only known diary of a civilian teenage boy spanning this period.

== Life ==
LeRoy was the son of John J. and Mary Gresham. His father was "twice mayor," a prominent businessman, judge, and attorney. His mother (née Mary Baxter 1822) was the sister of Sallie Bird; thus he is briefly mentioned in correspondence kept in the Baxter-Bird-Smith Family Papers of the University of Georgia Libraries.

LeRoy was severely injured when a chimney collapsed on him and crushed his left leg in 1856. He was semi-mobile thereafter, but developed other more serious medical issues related to a slow-progressing disease that would eventually kill him. LeRoy spent almost all of his time sitting, reclining, or confined to a special wagon pulled about town by family members or slaves. In 1860, LeRoy's mother, Mary Gresham, gave him a journal to write in when he was about to leave with his father, John Gresham, for Philadelphia to see a specialist about "his condition." LeRoy (or "Loy" as he was known to his family) began writing in June of that year and only stopped five years later, just before his death, a handful of weeks after the war ended.

He is interred in Macon, Georgia in the Rose Hill Cemetery, Magnolia Section.

== Diaries ==
LeRoy's diaries offer insight into the life of a prominent slave-holding Southern family, the secession crisis, the four-year American Civil War, and slavery (his family owned 100 slaves on two plantations in Houston County, GA). His journals are also the only known 19th-century account that meticulously details, on a daily basis for five years, the course of a fatal disease (which is carefully identified in both books by a medical expert). The entries offer details on the treatments given to LeRoy by his doctors and family, his physical ailments (fever, abscesses, coughing, chronic pain, etc.), how the drugs affected him, and his steady decline until death.

=== Posthumous publication ===
His seven journals, edited and annotated by Janet E. Croon, were published June 1, 2018 by Savas Beatie under the title The War Outside My Window: The Civil War Journals of LeRoy Wiley Gresham, 1860-1865. The book includes the tagline "A remarkable account of the collapse of the Old South, and the final years of a privileged but afflicted life." The book won two major awards, and was a finalist for a third.

Selections from his diary appeared in a Library of Congress exhibit, "The Civil War in America", from 2012 to 2013, and were reprinted in Harper's Magazine. and featured in an article in The Washington Post.

A companion book dedicated solely to his medical condition was concurrently published as I Am Perhaps Dying: The Medical Backstory of Spinal Tuberculosis Hidden in the Civil War Diary of LeRoy Wiley Gresham, by Dr. Dennis Rasbach (Savas Beatie, 2018).

== See also ==
- Georgia in the American Civil War
- Sherman's March to the Sea
