= Tornadoes of 1954 =

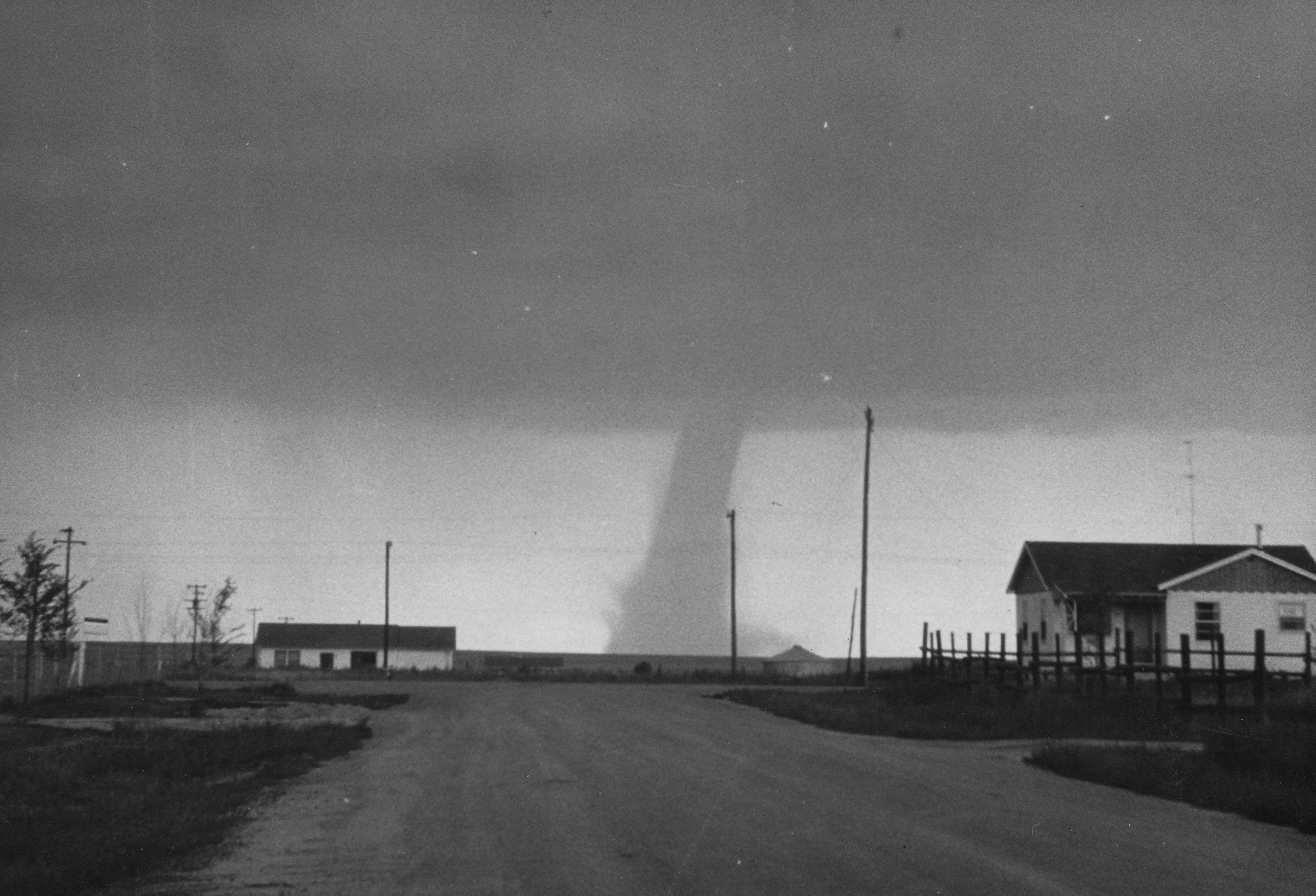
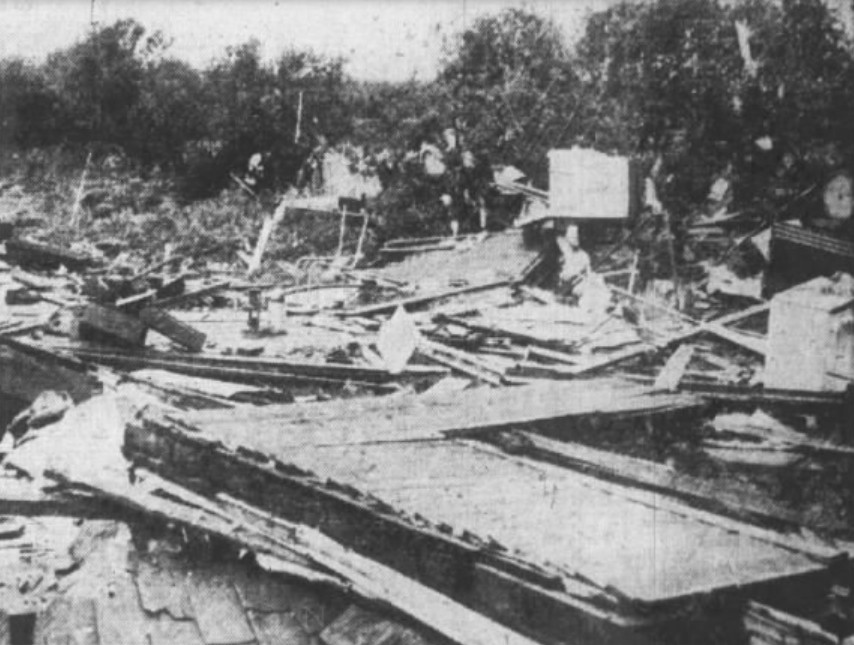
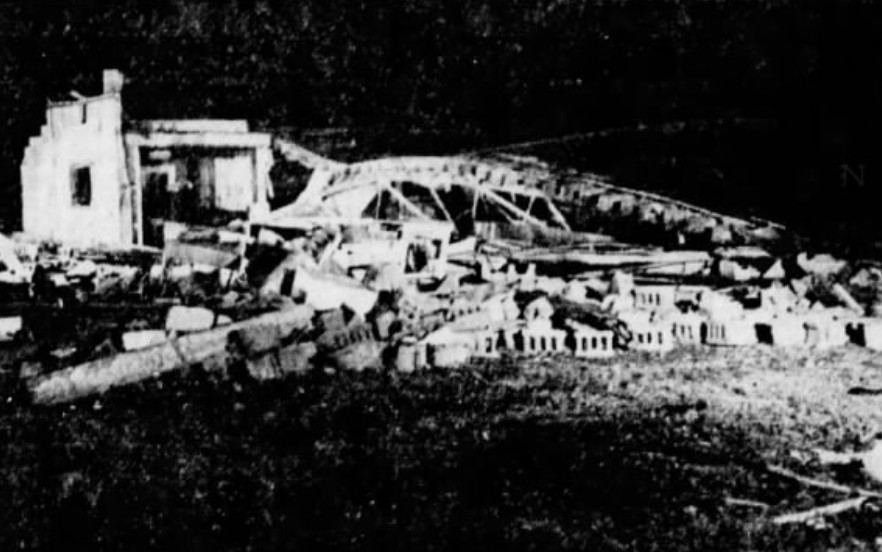
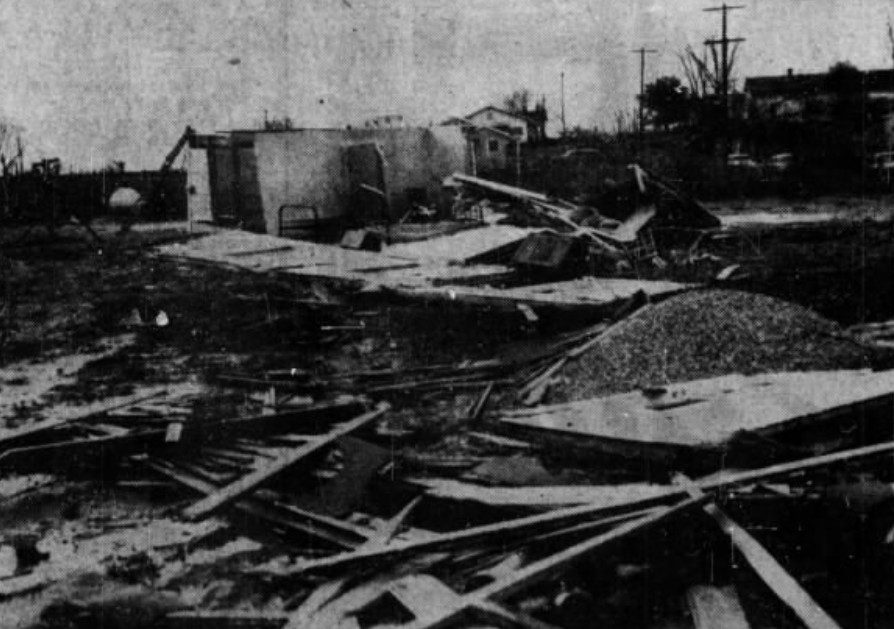
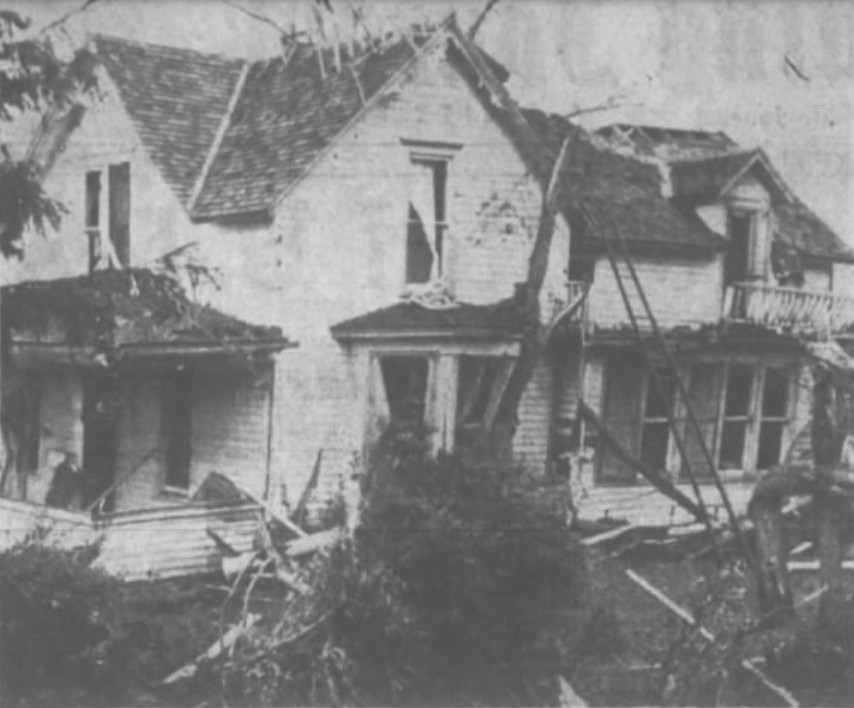
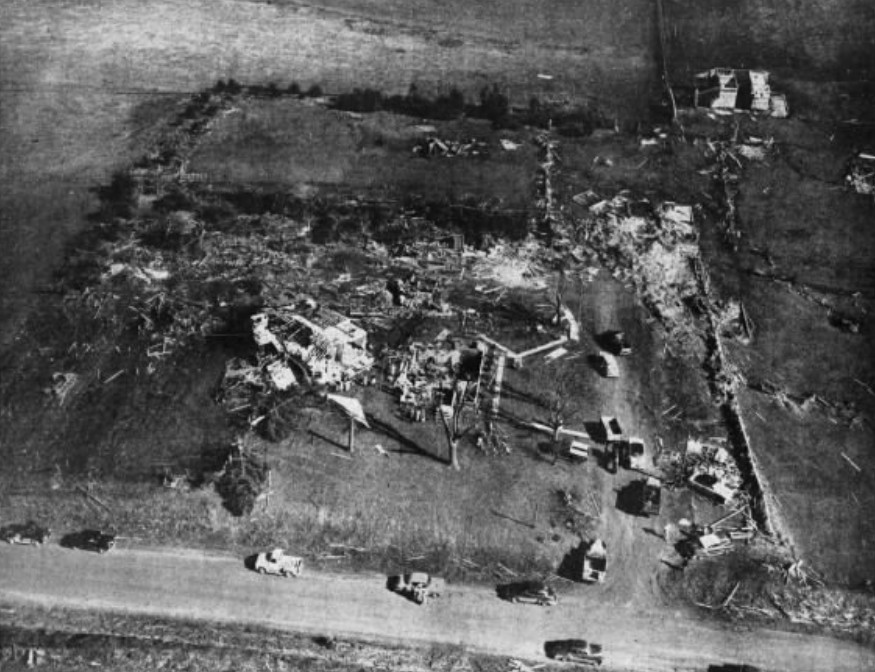
- Clockwise from top: A weak F1 tornado near Strasburg, Colorado on July 28; A concrete barn leveled by an F3 tornado near Franklin, Indiana on October 11; Damage to a home north of Pilger, Nebraska after an F3 tornado on June 17; A destroyed farmstead after an F4 tornado near Northboro, Iowa on April 5; Damage to a home in Laurel, Mississippi after an F3 tornado on December 28; A destroyed home near Caribou, Maine after an F2 tornado on August 11.
- Timespan: 1954
Maximum rated tornado
F4 tornado
- List
  – Texas County, Missouri
  on March 25
  – Siam, Iowa
  on April 5
  – Lafayette-Alburnett, Iowa
  on April 30
  – Vernon, Texas
  on May 1
  – Meeker-Sparks, Oklahoma
  on May 1
  – Madison County, Nebraska
  on May 30
  – Lake City-Rockwell City, Iowa
  on June 9
- Tornadoes in U.S.: 550
- Damage (U.S.): $85.805 million (1954 USD)
- Fatalities (U.S.): 36
- Fatalities (worldwide): >36

This page documents the tornadoes and tornado outbreaks of 1954, primarily in the United States. Most tornadoes form in the U.S., although some events may take place internationally. Tornado statistics for older years like this often appear significantly lower than modern years due to fewer reports or confirmed tornadoes.

The total count of tornadoes and ratings differs from various agencies accordingly. The article, therefore, documents information from the most contemporary official sources alongside assessments from tornado historian Thomas P. Grazulis.

== Events ==
Fatal United States tornadoes in 1954
- Approximate touchdown location of killer tornadoes in 1954
Summary of tornadoes
- February 16 – Arkansas (1 death)
- February 19 – Louisiana (1 death)
- March 13 – Alabama, Georgia (2 deaths)
- March 13 – Georgia (5 deaths)
- March 13 – Georgia (1 death)
- March 25 – Missouri (2 deaths)
- April 7 – Illinois (1 death)
- April 30 – Louisiana (1 death)
- May 1 – Oklahoma (3 deaths)
- May 30 – Nebraska (6 deaths)
- June 1 – Texas (1 death)
- June 1 – Texas (1 death)
- June 2 – Texas (1 death)
- June 9 – Iowa (1 death)
- June 17 – Nebraska (1 death)
- August 11 – Maine (1 death)
- September 18 – Florida (2 deaths)
- September 30 – Ohio (1 death)
- October 11 – Indiana (2 deaths)
- December 5 – Alabama, Georgia (1 death)
- December 5 – Georgia (1 death)
Total fatalities: 36

1954 broke the record for the most active tornado season just one year after 1953 set the mark. Unlike the previous year, however, many tornadoes were weak and the death toll for the year was much lower. April, May, and June all saw more than 100 tornadoes, the first time any month had officially seen more than 100. April was the most active of the three with 113 tornadoes. Meanwhile, the deadliest month was May, which had 13 fatalities.

=== United States yearly total ===
Confirmed tornadoes by Fujita rating
FU	F0	F1	F2	F3	F4	F5	Total
0	89	226	189	39	7	0	550

== January ==
There were two tornadoes confirmed in the US in January.

=== January 20 ===
FU	F0	F1	F2	F3	F4	F5
0	0	1	1	0	0	0

Two tornadoes developed within a squall line to the southeast of Starkville, Mississippi. First, a narrow, but strong F2 tornado, which was described as "two ribbons in the sky" with one of them touching down in a skipping fashion and absorbing the other, started near Oktoc. It destroyed two small homes and a barn, damaged other structures, and downed power lines and trees. The tornado remained aloft between Artesia and Mayhew before dissipating near the latter town. Two people were injured. While the first tornado was in progress, an F1 tornado formed near the Tombigbee River south of Columbus and moved northeastward. Damage was limited to destroyed or damaged outbuildings.

=== January 30 (Nova Scotia) ===
A tornado accompanied by hail and lightning struck White Point Beach, Nova Scotia near Liverpool, although the damage done is unknown.

== February ==
There were 17 tornadoes confirmed in the US in February.

=== February 15–16 ===
FU	F0	F1	F2	F3	F4	F5
0	0	1	1	2	0	0

Three strong tornadoes struck Arkansas. On February 15, an F3 tornado hit Clarksville, destroying the gymnasium at the College of the Ozarks. It also destroyed eight homes and 60 other buildings, while damaging 160 other homes and 172 other buildings. There were 24 injuries. An F2 tornado than hit near Kellum in rural Sevier County, destroying a barn and damaging a home and trees, but causing no casualties. Early on February 16, a 1/2-mile-wide (0.80 km) F3 tornado struck Chelford in Mississippi County, destroying a school, a church, four homes, and 20 other buildings. A man was killed in a small home that was completely swept away while injuring four other people were injured. An additional F1 tornado was observed "dipping" down and causing damage in Gaffney, South Carolina that afternoon, but there were no casualties. Overall, the four tornadoes killed one and injured 28.

=== February 19–21 ===
FU	F0	F1	F2	F3	F4	F5
0	0	3	7	0	0	0

An outbreak of mostly strong F2 tornadoes struck the Southern United States. On February 19, an F2 tornado struck Gorman, Texas, destroying 13 buildings and damaging 18 homes and 20 other buildings, injuring two people. Another F2 tornado touched down three times, striking Conroe during one of its touchdowns. Four homes and 10 other buildings were destroyed, nine other homes and four other buildings were damaged, and trees were snapped, injuring seven people. Yet another F2 tornado was spotted striking Sulphur Springs, Arkansas. Six homes and two other buildings were destroyed, three other homes were damaged, and one person was injured. A deadly F2 tornado struck a first offender camp at Angola in Tunica, Louisiana, ripping the roof off a dormitory and damaging guard towers and power lines. One person was killed and four others were injured. (the CDNS report lists only two injuries, which may have been caused by lightning and not the tornado, and Grazulis rated the tornado F1) Early on February 20, a long-tracked F2 tornado moved through Sumrall and Sanford, Mississippi along with an additional community west of Laurel, damaging or destroying over 90 homes and over 60 other buildings and damaged trees and agriculture supplies in storages. There were 10 injures. Another long-tracked F2 tornado passed through mostly rural areas and communities in Newton County and Neshoba County, passing near Decatur and through the House community. It damaged or destroyed 65 homes along with numerous other buildings and outbuildings, also injuring 10 people, all of which occurred in House. Overall, the 10 tornadoes killed one and injured 34.

== March ==
There were 62 tornadoes confirmed in the US in March.

=== March 13 ===
FU	F0	F1	F2	F3	F4	F5
0	0	2	0	2	0	0

An outbreak of four tornadoes struck Alabama and Georgia. A large F3 tornado struck Fort Mitchell, Alabama and Fort Benning, Georgia, damaging or destroying homes, buildings, and military equipment, killing two people and injuring 20 others (Grazulis rated the tornado F2 and said the tornado was embedded within a much larger area of damaging microburst winds). Another long-tracked F3 tornado began near Howard, Georgia, striking the communities Roberta, Knoxville, Lizella, Vineville and Macon, damaging or destroying over 750 homes, killing five, and injuring 75. An F1 satellite tornado was also observed northeast of Butler, damaging or destroying homes, but causing no casualties. Another weak, but fatal, long-tracked F1 tornado developed near Reynolds, moving through rural areas before striking Byron, Centerville and Elberta on the north side of Warner Robins and Robins Air Force Base. It then impacted Bullard east of there before dissipating. The tornado produced moderate to heavy damage along its path, especially in Elberta, where it unroofed or destroyed 12 small homes and killed a tenant farmer. Five other people were injured (Grazulis rated the tornado F2). This came just 10 months after F4 and F2 tornadoes caused considerable damage and casualties to these same areas. Overall, the four tornadoes killed eight and injured 100.

=== March 24–25 ===
FU	F0	F1	F2	F3	F4	F5
0	0	10	16	1	1	0

An outbreak of 28 tornadoes struck the Great Plains and Arkansas. On March 24, an F1 tornado struck Frisco, Texas, destroying a grain elevator, blowing out windows, unroofing houses, and damaging barns, TV antennas, and sheds. Four injuries were officially counted, although the CDNS report does not list any injuries. Later, an F3 tornado moved through Centerton, Bentonville, and Twelve Corners, Arkansas, damaging or destroying several small homes, barns, and outbuildings, and killing a considerable number of chickens. Four people were injured. (Grazulis rated the tornado F2) An F2 tornado struck Lanagan and Longview, Missouri, damaging or destroying several small frame farmhouses, leveling small barns and outbuildings, and injuring or killing livestock. One person was injured. (Grazulis did not rate this as a significant (F2+) tornado) Another F3 tornado injured two near Cato, Missouri while destroying a two-story seven-room home and damaging trees, small frame homes, barns, and loose equipment. Overnight on March 25, a violent F4 tornado touched down near Bendavis in rural Texas County and moved northeastward to the northwest of Houston. It passed near Huggins, Upton, Bucyrus, and Success, damaging or destroying buildings on 20 farms. A frame house was obliterated with debris scattered up to 2 miles (3.2 km) away. The two occupants, an elderly woman and her son, were thrown 150 yards (140 m) and killed. Barns, outbuildings, and a truck were also destroyed and trees were downed as well. Overall, the outbreak killed two and injured 11.

== April ==
There were 113 tornadoes confirmed in the US in April. This was the first month in recorded history to have over 100 tornadoes.

=== April 5–8 ===
FU	F0	F1	F2	F3	F4	F5
0	1	7	11	5	1	0

An outbreak of 25 tornadoes occurred across mostly the Midwest. On April 5, a large F4 tornado tracked northeastward from west of Westboro, Missouri, destroying four homes and 25 outbuildings and damaging four other homes and 40 more outbuildings. It also threw a pickup truck 300 yards (270 m), removed 2 inches (5.1 cm) of topsoil, and uprooted trees and crops. Two people were injured. The tornado then crossed into Iowa and passed near Northboro, where it destroyed three more homes before dissipating. (Grazulis rated the tornado F3, but said near-F4 damage occurred) Later, a half-mile wide F2 tornado moved northeastward from near Scranton to near Farlin, damaging 18 farms, including five that suffered severe damage, destroyed one home, and threw timber through the walls of other homes. One person was injured. (Grazulis rated the tornado F3) Later, another F3 tornado east of Northboro unroofed a house. (Grazulis mentions this as only a possible tornado) Nearby, an F2 tornado began near Elmo, Missouri and moved northeastward, passing south of Braddyville, Iowa and northwest of Siam, Iowa before dissipating north of Bedford. The most severe damage occurred northwest of Siam, where at least two homes were leveled and swept away (the NCEI incorrectly labels this tornado as only being in Taylor County, Iowa; Grazulis rated the tornado F4). On April 6, an F2 tornado struck Ferdinand, Indiana, damaging several homes, two garages, two barns, and the roof of a church. (Grazulis did not rate this as a significant (F2+) tornado)

On April 7, four people were injured by an F2 tornado south of Avoca, Wisconsin that destroyed a farmhouse and 13 farm buildings, including several barns that were leveled, damaged seven other farm houses and 37 other farm buildings, and killed a cow. (Grazulis rated the tornado F3) Later, further to the south in Illinois, a deadly, long-tracked F3 tornado touched down near Saunemin and moved northeastward, lifting briefly before touching down again in Limestone Township. Continuing northeastward, the tornado tore through Indian Oaks north of Kankakee as a bell-shaped funnel cloud, destroying most of the town before ending west of Grant Park. Eight homes and 30 other buildings were destroyed, 30 other homes and 46 other buildings were damaged, about 30 farms lost buildings, and empty storage tanks were rolled for over 1 mile (1.6 km). A woman was killed in a destroyed farmhouse and 13 other people were injured. (Grazulis lists the tornado as only occurring in Kankakee County due to the path break listed by the CDNS report, which did not include Ford County) The final strong tornado of outbreak was a brief F2 tornado in Swartz Creek, Michigan that was described as "seven fingers dangling beneath a dark cloud" with one of them touching down. A fire station and a garage was leveled with the garage roof thrown 100 yards (91 m), two barns were destroyed, and two cars, two fire engines, and store windows were damaged. Two people were injured. (the CDNS report and Grazulis list the tornado as having occurred on April 8) In all, the tornadoes killed one and injured 22.

=== April 25 – May 3 ===
FU	F0	F1	F2	F3	F4	F5
0	11	39	37	10	3	0

A massive tornado outbreak sequence struck a large portion of the US, with April 30 and May 1 being the most prolific days with 29 and 19 tornadoes touching down respectively. On April 30, several large, long-tracked tornadoes and tornado families moved through the Great Plains and the Mississippi Valley. This included an F3 tornado family that damaged or destroyed homes, farm buildings, and automobiles along a 139.9-mile-path (225.1 km) that started near Carlson and passed through Beyersville and Gause before dissipating near Grapeland. Six people were injured by this tornado (Grazulis rated this tornado F2). Another long-tracked tornado family (which was rated F2) struck Beulah, leveling a rural school and unroofing a nearby home; there were 25 injuries along the tornado's path. In Oklahoma, an intense F3 tornado struck the southeastern part of Hugo, obliterating and sweeping away 50 homes while leveling 100 other homes, injuring 12 people. A fatality occurred near Many, Louisiana due to an F2 tornado that destroyed a barn and a house while damaging six other homes. In Iowa, a long-tracked, violent F4 tornado family leveled homes between Alburnett and Lafayette with additional severe damage near Dundee and on the east side of Garber, although there were no casualties.

May 1 was the most violent and the deadliest day as a tornado outbreak struck Texas, Oklahoma, and Kansas. The tornado activity began with a violent, long-tracked .25-mile wide F4 tornado that traveled 68.6 miles through Vernon, Texas and Manitou, Oklahoma, injuring two. This tornado may have reached F5 intensity as vehicles were thrown more than 100 yds (300 ft), and three farms were entirely swept away. An erratic F3 tornado then struck rural areas in Tillman and Cotton Counties in Oklahoma, damaging 10 homes and completely obliterating a farm. Three people were injured while three others were killed, two of which were from the tornado throwing a pickup truck 1/4 mi (0.40 km). Later, a violent, long-tracked F4 tornado touched down in Southeastern Oklahoma City north of Lake Thunderbird and proceeded mainly northeast for 59.2 miles through the towns of McLoud, Sparks, Davenport, Stroud, and Milfay, injuring 65. The tornado also destroyed the town of Meeker, where no fatalities took place thanks to a timely warning of the storm by TV meteorologist Harry Volkman. One resident told a reporter "God bless Harry Volkman." This eventually resulted in the government lifting its ban on tornado warnings.

In the end, 100 tornadoes were confirmed, making it one of the largest outbreaks on record at the time. Four people were killed, and 167 others were injured.

== May ==
There were 101 tornadoes confirmed in the US in May.

=== May 10 ===
FU	F0	F1	F2	F3	F4	F5
0	0	1	1	1	0	0

Two brief, but strong tornadoes struck Connecticut. The first one struck just north of Ellington at F3 strength, destroying an eight-room house, a barn, and three tobacco sheds. Two people were injured (Grazulis listed the tornado as an F2). Later, an intermittent F2 tornado touched down at a Girl Scout Camp near East Hartland, destroying a small garage, and damaging a roof, trees, and a few tents (Grazulis did list the tornado as significant (F2+)). An additional brief F1 tornado was observed north-northwest of Normangee, Texas; it damaged a house while also damaging or destroying several barns.

=== May 30 – June 3 ===
FU	F0	F1	F2	F3	F4	F5
0	3	14	18	3	1	0

Another large and deadly tornado outbreak sequence struck the US. May 30 produced only two tornadoes, but one of them was the only violent tornado of the outbreak. The F4 tornado hit Kalamazoo, Warnerville, Nebraska, and Eastern Norfolk, killing six and injuring 23. Weaker, but more prolific tornado activity occurred on May 31 with an F2 tornado striking Onarga, Illinois, injuring two people. More tornado activity occurred on June 1, with Western North Texas receiving the brunt of the storms. An F3 tornado moved through Paducah and areas east of Chalk, killing one and injuring 14. Another F3 tornado struck Iowa Park and Northern Pleasant Valley northwest of Wichita Falls, killing one and injuring four. The third, and final, F3 tornado then briefly touched down right over Downtown Burkburnett, injuring three. June 2 featured one more fatal tornado when a large, 1,000 yd-wide (910 m) F2 tornado killed one and injured eight in Enloe, Texas, although tornado activity lasted until June 3. Overall, 39 tornadoes were confirmed along with nine fatalities and 65 injuries.

== June ==
There were 107 tornadoes confirmed in the US in June.

=== June 9 ===
FU	F0	F1	F2	F3	F4	F5
0	2	0	0	0	1	0

Two brief F0 tornadoes touched down in Idaho during the afternoon of June 9. The first one occurred near the National Reactor Testing Station, causing no damage. The second one destroyed a 28 by 50 foot barn and two combines in storage near Lamont. That night, a violent F4 tornado tore through farmland from near Lake City, Iowa northeastward to near Rockwell City, damaging or destroying buildings on six farms. A farmer was killed as he slept in a farmhouse that was destroyed.

=== June 17 ===
FU	F0	F1	F2	F3	F4	F5
0	0	1	1	1	0	0

A strong F2 tornado struck Southeastern Muncie, Indiana. A warehouse was unroofed with its contents further damaged by heavy rain, homes and businesses were damaged, and trees were knocked down onto power lines, knocking out the electricity in the area (Grazulis did not rate this tornado as significant (F2+)). Later in Nebraska, a narrow, but intense F3 tornado moved through areas from north of Pilger and west of Pender before striking Thruston, heavily damaging or destroying buildings on 17 farms, obliterating a church, and destroying a school. A woman was killed southeast of Winside (the CDNS report and Grazulis list an injury as well, but this is not officially documented). An additional weak, but large and damaging F1 tornado just northeast of Rush City, Minnesota leveled barns, granaries, and silos on five farms, and destroyed 12 barns and rural school. One farmhouse had 2x4s driven through its walls after the tornado destroyed a barn and every outbuilding on the property and many power poles and wires were downed (Grazulis rated the tornado F2). Grazulis also lists an F2 tornado in Wayne County, Nebraska that damaged or destroyed about 100 farm buildings including barns and farmhouses, but this was not officially documented.

== July ==
There were 45 tornadoes confirmed in the US in July.

=== July 18 ===
A brief, but intense F3 tornado struck the town of Tatum, Texas. Garages, barns, small buildings, and a high school gymnasium were destroyed and other buildings were unroofed, but there were no casualties. Grazulis rated the tornado F2.

== August ==
There were 49 tornadoes confirmed in the US in August.

=== August 11 ===
FU	F0	F1	F2	F3	F4	F5
0	1	0	1	0	0	0

An F0 tornado inflicted considerable damage to two light aircraft near Fort Pierce South, Florida. Later, an unusually fatal F2 tornado occurred near Aroostook County, Maine. A home was destroyed when it was thrown into another one, which was damaged, and two barns were destroyed. One person was killed while another person was injured.

== September ==
There were 21 tornadoes confirmed in the US in September.

=== September 14 (Philippines) ===
A tornado touched down over Mindanao's Cagayan de Oro in the Philippines, damaging eight homes and many trees. Eight people were injured.

=== September 18 ===
Just over a month after the previous tornado, an isolated, brief, but stronger F3 tornado touched down on the northeast side of Fort Pierce South, Florida, throwing a small house 200 feet (61 m) before it was destroyed, leaving only the bathtub and plumbing fixtures behind. The couple inside the house were killed, while their son and another guest were injured. Grazulis rated the tornado F2.

=== September 30 ===
FU	F0	F1	F2	F3	F4	F5
0	0	0	2	0	0	0

A fatal F2 tornado west of Minerva, Ohio destroyed homes and barns just west of a small airport, killing one and injuring three. Another F2 tornado struck Sharpsville, Pennsylvania, damaging 12 homes (including one that was unroofed), uprooting trees, snapping power poles, destroying a barn, greenhouse, and trailer, and killing eight cows.

== October ==
There were 14 tornadoes confirmed in the US in October.

=== October 10–11 ===
FU	F0	F1	F2	F3	F4	F5
0	0	3	0	2	0	0

Five damaging tornadoes touched down across five states over a two-day span in mid-October. On October 10, an F1 tornado struck the Ravisloe Country Club in Homewood, Illinois in the southern suburbs of Chicago, damaging trees and tees, scattering lumber in a large lumber yard, and inflicting minor structural damage to homes. Early on October 11 in Kansas, an F3 tornado moved east through rural areas from north of Catherine to north of Gorham. A garage was destroyed, a house was unroofed, other buildings were damaged or destroyed, oil derricks were blown over, and a pickup truck was tossed 30 ft (9.1 m) into the air (Grazulis rated the tornado F2). That afternoon, another F3 tornado impacted western edge of Franklin, Indiana destroying multiple homes, barns, and a church while heavily damaging 32 other homes, killing two people (Grazulis and the CDNS report indicate that there were also 10 injuries, but this was not officially documented). Another F1 tornado touched down over open country southwest of Columbus, damaging a barn and a shed and shaking a house for about 10 seconds. The final F1 tornado touched down near Salesville, Texas, severely damaging the roof of a home, snapping three power poles, and damaging trees.

== November ==
There were two tornadoes confirmed in the US in November.

== December ==
There were 17 tornadoes confirmed in the US in December.

=== December 5 ===
FU	F0	F1	F2	F3	F4	F5
0	0	4	8	2	0	0

An outbreak of 14 tornadoes struck Alabama and Georgia. The first tornado was a long-tracked F3 tornado hit the northern side of Opelika, Alabama before striking Hamilton, Blue Mountain Valley, and Manchester, Georgia, injuring seven on a 51-mile-path (82 km) (Grazulis assessed the tornado as having caused F2-level damage). After that, another F3 tornado hit Ohatchee, Wellington, Angel, Prices, and Piedmont, Alabama, injuring 26. Next, an F2 tornado struck Blakely, Georgia, injuring two (the CDNS report did not list any casualties). After that, another long-tracked F2 tornado hit areas north of Eufaula, Alabama before striking Lumpkin and Ellaville, Georgia, killing one and injuring 35 along its 71.5-mile-path (115.1 km). Later, an F2 tornado moved directly through Buena Vista, Georgia, injuring seven. An F1 tornado east of Talbotton, Georgia injured six (Grazulis classified the tornado as an F2) while another F1 tornado north of Youngblood, Alabama injured two (Grazulis classified the tornado as a low-end F2). The final tornado of the outbreak was a short-lived, but strong F2 tornado that struck areas northeast of East Point, Georgia in the southwestern suburbs of Atlanta, killing one and injuring 40. In the end, two people were killed and 125 others were injured.

=== December 8 (United Kingdom) ===
FU	F0	F1	F2	F3	F4	F5
0	2	4	0	1	0	0

Several tornadoes occurred in the suburbs of London, United Kingdom, including an F3 tornado which caused severe damage to parts of West London, in particular the districts of Gunnersbury and Acton, injuring at least 30.

=== December 28–29 ===
FU	F0	F1	F2	F3	F4	F5
0	0	1	1	1	0	0

Three tornadoes caused injuries in Mississippi. On December 28, a brief, but damaging F1 tornado, destroyed a home, damaged five others, and injured two people southeast of Burns (Grazulis rated the tornado low-end F2). At the same time, an F3 tornado moved directly through Laurel, destroying 20 homes and two other buildings and damaging 87 other homes and six other buildings as it moved over 20 blocks of the city, injuring 25 people. Early the next day, an F2 tornado struck Gholson, destroying three homes and eight outbuildings, damaging four other homes and 21 other outbuildings, and injuring nine people. In all, the three tornadoes injured 36 people.

== See also ==
- Tornado
  - Tornadoes by year
  - Tornado records
  - Tornado climatology
  - Tornado myths
- List of tornado outbreaks
  - List of F5 and EF5 tornadoes
  - List of North American tornadoes and tornado outbreaks
  - List of 21st-century Canadian tornadoes and tornado outbreaks
  - List of European tornadoes and tornado outbreaks
  - List of tornadoes and tornado outbreaks in Asia
  - List of Southern Hemisphere tornadoes and tornado outbreaks
  - List of tornadoes striking downtown areas
  - List of tornadoes with confirmed satellite tornadoes
- Tornado intensity
  - Fujita scale
  - Enhanced Fujita scale

== Sources ==
- Grazulis, Thomas P. (July 1993). Significant Tornadoes 1680–1991: A Chronology and Analysis of Events. St. Johnsbury, Vermont: The Tornado Project of Environmental Films. ISBN 1-879362-03-1.
- Grazulis, Thomas P. (2001b). F5-F6 Tornadoes. St. Johnsbury, Vermont: The Tornado Project of Environmental Films.
- National Weather Service (April–June 1954). Storm Data Publication (Report). National Centers for Environmental Information – via Storm Events Database.
- U.S. Weather Bureau (April 1954). "Storm data and unusual weather phenomena". Climatological Data National Summary. 5 (4). Asheville, North Carolina: National Climatic Data Center: 106–115.
- U.S. Weather Bureau (May 1954). "Storm data and unusual weather phenomena". Climatological Data National Summary. 5 (5). Asheville, North Carolina: National Climatic Data Center: 138–41.
