= Tornado outbreak sequence of April 28 – May 2, 1953 =

Group of connected American natural disasters

Meteorological history
- Formed: April 28, 1953
- Dissipated: May 2, 1953

Tornado outbreak
- Tornadoes: 24
- Max. rating: F4 tornado
- Duration: 5 days, 3 hours, 45 minutes
- Highest winds: >100 mph (160 km/h); Warner Robins, Georgia F4 tornado
- Highest gusts: 80 mph (130 km/h)
- Largest hail: 1.75 inches (4.4 cm)

Overall effects
- Fatalities: 36 (+4 non-tornadic)
- Injuries: 361 (+>14 non-tornadic)
- Damage: $26.713 million (1953 USD) $321 million (2025 USD)
- Areas affected: Southeastern United States
- Part of the tornado outbreaks of 1953

A widespread, destructive, and deadly tornado outbreak sequence affected the Southeastern United States from April 28 to May 2, 1953, producing 24 tornadoes, including five violent F4 tornadoes. The deadliest event of the sequence was an F4 tornado family that ravaged Robins Air Force Base in Warner Robins, Georgia, on April 30, killing at least 18 people and injuring 300 or more others. On May 1, a pair of F4 tornadoes also struck Alabama, causing a combined nine deaths and 15 injuries. Additionally, another violent tornado struck rural Tennessee after midnight on May 2, killing four people and injuring eight. Additionally, two intense tornadoes impacted Greater San Antonio, Texas, on April 28, killing three people and injuring 20 altogether. In all, 36 people were killed, 361 others were injured, and total damages reached $26.713 million (1953 USD). (Note: An outbreak is generally defined as a group of at least six tornadoes (the number sometimes varies slightly according to local climatology) with no more than a six-hour gap between individual tornadoes. An outbreak sequence, prior to (after) the start of modern records in 1950, is defined as a period of no more than two (one) consecutive days without at least one significant (F2 or stronger) tornado.) (Note: The Fujita scale was devised under the aegis of scientist T. Theodore Fujita in the early 1970s. Prior to the advent of the scale in 1971, tornadoes in the United States were officially unrated. While the Fujita scale has been superseded by the Enhanced Fujita scale in the U.S. since February 1, 2007, Canada utilized the old scale until April 1, 2013; nations elsewhere, like the United Kingdom, apply other classifications such as the TORRO scale.) (Note: Historically, the number of tornadoes globally and in the United States was and is likely underrepresented: research by Grazulis on annual tornado activity suggests that, as of 2001, only 53% of yearly U.S. tornadoes were officially recorded. Documentation of tornadoes outside the United States was historically less exhaustive, owing to the lack of monitors in many nations and, in some cases, to internal political controls on public information. Most countries only recorded tornadoes that produced severe damage or loss of life. Significant low biases in U.S. tornado counts likely occurred through the early 1990s, when advanced NEXRAD was first installed and the National Weather Service began comprehensively verifying tornado occurrences.) There were additional casualties from non-tornadic events as well, including a washout which caused a train derailment that injured 10.

== Meteorological synopsis ==
Several low-pressure systems moved across North America from the end of April to the beginning of May. The first one dropped a cold front southward out of Canada. Another low came south-southeastward out of Wyoming, and moved into Northeastern New Mexico on April 29 with a cold front that moved across Oklahoma and Texas while a third low over South Texas produced a warm front and a small trough across that region. The second low absorbed the third one turned back north and occluded on April 30 while a low pressure trough produced a dryline and warm front, which was attached to a cold front on its eastern side, over the Southeast. A fourth and fifth low moved one right behind the other out of Nevada eastward into the region at the beginning of May. A sixth one formed over Iowa on May 1 and moved eastward into Illinois with a cold front dropping southwestward all the way into Texas. Atmospheric conditions were continually favorable in all of these cases for the development of severe weather and tornadoes throughout the period.

== Confirmed tornadoes ==
Confirmed tornadoes by Fujita rating
FU	F0	F1	F2	F3	F4	F5	Total
0	3	6	7	3	5	0	24

- Note: The Climatological Data National Summary reported some additional tornadoes that were not counted toward the final total:

April 28

- A brief tornado was spotted aloft southwest of Greensburg, Kansas.

April 29

- Several buildings were damaged by a tornado in Lake Charles, Louisiana that just barely missed the Weather Bureau office at the Lake Charles Airport.
- Two tornadoes were spotted near Dighton, Kansas:
  - Tornado moved northeastward southwest of Dighton, causing no damage.
  - Tornado moved northeastward northeast of Dighton, "shaving wheat stubble" from the ground.

April 30

- A possible tornado caused damage in Beaver Rain, Georgia near the town of Norcross.
- Another possible tornado caused heavy damage in Baldwin County, Georgia while attendant rains caused additional damage.

May 2

- A wind damage report in Sumter, South Carolina was noted to have possibly been a tornado. This event also caused a fatality.

=== April 28 event ===
List of confirmed tornadoes – Tuesday, April 28, 1953 (Note: All dates are based on the local time zone where the tornado touched down; however, all times are in Coordinated Universal Time and dates are split at midnight CST/CDT for consistency.) (Note: Prior to 1994, only the average widths of tornado paths were officially listed.) (Note: Prior to 1994, the damage costs of storms were listed by damage class. Values listed in Storm Data are the medians of those classes.)
F#	Location	County / Parish	State	Start Coord.	Time (UTC)	Path length	Max. width	Summary
F0	NNE of Woodward	Woodward	OK	36.45°N 99.38°W	21:00–?	0.1 mi (0.16 km)	27 yd (25 m)	No damage occurred from this brief tornado that moved over open ranch land.
F1	SSW of Nashoba	Pushmataha	OK	34.45°N 95.3°W	22:15–?	0.1 mi (0.16 km)	100 yd (91 m)	This tornado struck the Divide School community, inflicting $250 in damage to several buildings on a farm.
F0	NE of Elyria	Valley	NE	41.73°N 98.93°W	22:30–?	0.9 mi (1.4 km)	30 yd (27 m)	A cowshed was destroyed with losses totaling $2,500.
F3	Smithville	Bastrop	TX	30°N 97.17°W	00:15–?	0.5 mi (0.80 km)	200 yd (180 m)	An intense tornado moved through Smithville. A total of 16 homes were damaged or destroyed, one of which was lofted 200 yards (180 m) from its foundation; however, the home lacked anchor bolts of any kind. Three people inside this home were injured. There were damaged roofs and garages from this tornado as well and losses totaled $25,000. Grazulis classified the tornado as an F2.
F1	Bradshaw	York	NE	40.88°N 97.75°W	01:00–?	0.1 mi (0.16 km)	10 yd (9.1 m)	A tornado moved through Bradshaw, destroying a chicken house while causing minor damage to adjacent buildings. Damage was estimated at $250.
F3	Helotes	Hays	TX	29.55°N 98.53°W	02:45–?	4.9 mi (7.9 km)	200 yd (180 m)	1 death – A deadly tornado struck the northwestern suburbs of San Antonio. It destroyed two (possibly four) homes while extensively damaging 15 others. Another house, barns, and outbuildings were destroyed as well. Damage values reached $250,000. The actual tornado casualty count may have been the tornado listed below.
F4	NW of Castle Hills to NW of Uptown San Antonio	Bexar	TX	29.57°N 98.7°W	03:00–?	1 mi (1.6 km)	1,760 yd (1,610 m)	2 deaths – A large, violent tornado struck the northern suburbs of San Antonio, ending southeast of present-day Hill Country Village and south-southeast of present-day Hollywood Park. One home was swept from its foundation and disintegrated. A vehicle was carried 200 yd (180 m) as well. A woman was killed and five other members of her family were injured when their home "exploded". A total of 15 people were injured, although no damage value was given. The actual tornado casualty count may have been the tornado listed above.

=== April 29 event ===
List of confirmed tornadoes – Wednesday, April 29, 1953
F#	Location	County / Parish	State	Start Coord.	Time (UTC)	Path length	Max. width	Summary
F2	SSW of Choudrant to Downsville	Lincoln	LA	32.48°N 92.53°W	18:30–?	11.5 mi (18.5 km)	200 yd (180 m)	Several outbuildings and six homes were damaged with losses totaling $2,500. The tornado may have occurred at 06:30 UTC rather than 18:30 UTC according to the CDNS report.

=== April 30 event ===
List of confirmed tornadoes – Thursday, April 30, 1953
F#	Location	County / Parish	State	Start Coord.	Time (UTC)	Path length	Max. width	Summary
F2	NE of Buena Vista	Marion	GA	32.33°N 84.5°W	20:00–?	0.3 mi (0.48 km)	20 yd (18 m)	One home was damaged and another was destroyed by this strong tornado. Moderate to heavy damage was inflicted to other buildings and power and telephone lines and trees were blown down. Damage was estimated at $25,000 and three people were injured.
F1	N of Fagan	Peach	GA	32.52°N 83.88°W	22:00–?	1 mi (1.6 km)	100 yd (91 m)	This damaging tornado, which occurred 2 miles (3.2 km) south of Fort Valley, was the first member of a 50-mile-long (80 km) tornado family that tracked from Fort Valley to near Jeffersonville and included the devastating F4 tornado listed below. It moved east-northeastward and impacted seven families on two farms with three farmhouses being destroyed and another one being damaged. Numerous other buildings sustained roof damage, a tractor was damaged, and a garden and row of pecan trees was destroyed. Five people were injured and losses totaled $25,000. The CDNS report only lists two injuries while giving the tornado a start time of 22:10 UTC. Grazulis listed this event as the beginning of the path of the Warner Robins F4 tornado.
F4	Southern Warner Robins to Robins Air Force Base	Houston	GA	32.6°N 83.6°W	22:13–?	1 mi (1.6 km)	333 yd (304 m)	18 deaths – See section on this tornado – 300 people were injured and losses totaled $25 million.
F2	S of Dry Branch	Twiggs	GA	32.78°N 83.5°W	22:30–?	0.5 mi (0.80 km)	10 yd (9.1 m)	1 death – A strong tornado caused damage along Reggins Mill Road. A church was destroyed, a porch was unroofed, a car was hurled 75 yd (69 m) and damaged, and several other homes and property was damaged. Three people were injured and losses totaled $25,000. Grazulis says this event was a continuation of the Warner Robins F4 tornado.
F3	Jeffersonville	Twiggs	GA	32.7°N 83.35°W	22:30–?	2 mi (3.2 km)	10 yd (9.1 m)	1 death – An intense tornado skirted Downtown Jeffersonville and caused major damage as moved northeastward near the Kooler Mines on Reggins Road. Four rural homes were destroyed, 11 other homes and trees were damaged and 15 families were affected. Two people were injured and losses totaled $250,000. Grazulis says this event was a continuation of the Warner Robins F4 tornado.
F2	Centerville to Northern Elberta	Houston	GA	32.63°N 83.7°W	23:40–?	5.6 mi (9.0 km)	200 yd (180 m)	A separate strong tornado tracked northeastward through areas northwest of Warner Robins, destroying a church, several homes, and barns. Losses totaled $250,000.
F0	Southern Abingdon	Washington	VA	36.7°N 81.98°W	23:45–?	1 mi (1.6 km)	220 yd (200 m)	Damage was confined to buildings within a small area with losses totaling $2,500. The CDNS report says the tornado was on the ground for only 880 yards (800 m).
F1	NE of Potters Hill	Pender, Onslow, Jones	NC	35°N 77.67°W	00:00–?	0.1 mi (0.16 km)	10 yd (9.1 m)	This tornado caused minor damage to roofs and destroyed three outbuildings with losses totaling $25,000. The exact track of the tornado is unknown.

=== May 1 event ===
List of confirmed tornadoes – Friday, May 1, 1953
F#	Location	County / Parish	State	Start Coord.	Time (UTC)	Path length	Max. width	Summary
F2	Minooka/Ocampo	Chilton	AL	33.03°N 86.75°W	23:15–?	1.5 mi (2.4 km)	100 yd (91 m)	Strong tornado destroyed three homes and six barns and damaged six other homes. Two people were injured and losses totaled $25,000.
F4	N of Millerville to Southern Ashland to Southern Lineville	Clay	AL	33.22°N 85.93°W	01:30–?	12.1 mi (19.5 km)	440 yd (400 m)	7 deaths – See section on this tornado – There were 12 injures, and $250,000 in damage.
F1	Western Trussville	Jefferson	AL	33.62°N 86.62°W	02:00–?	0.1 mi (0.16 km)	10 yd (9.1 m)	A brief tornado struck Trussville just west of downtown, destroying five homes and another building while damaging at least one other building. Losses totaled $2,500. Grazulis classified the tornado as an F2.
F4	Northern Yantley	Choctaw	AL	32.25°N 88.38°W	02:00–?	0.1 mi (0.16 km)	100 yd (91 m)	2 deaths – A violent tornado devastated the north side of Yantley. Three homes were destroyed, including one that disintegrated with its cookstove found 1/4 mi (0.40 km) away while other debris was scattered up to 1/2 mi (0.80 km) away. The tornado also removed 35 ft (11 m) of curbing. Three people were injured and losses totaled $25,000. The NWS Birmingham list the path length as being 10 mi (16 km). According to Grazulis and CDNS this tornado or a separate but related event may have touched down south of Riderwood and passed south of Lisman.

=== May 2 event ===
List of confirmed tornadoes – Saturday, May 2, 1953
F#	Location	County / Parish	State	Start Coord.	Time (UTC)	Path length	Max. width	Summary
F2	W of Powell	Anderson, Knox	TN	36.03°N 84.07°W	08:15–?	0.8 mi (1.3 km)	100 yd (91 m)	A brief, but strong tornado touched down between Claxton and Powell. Four homes were destroyed while four others along with two other buildings on a farm property were damaged. Seven families were affected and losses totaled $2,500.
F4	E of Decatur to Niota	Meigs, McMinn	TN	35.52°N 84.78°W	09:00–?	4.2 mi (6.8 km)	33 yd (30 m)	4 deaths – See section on this tornado – Eight people were injured and losses totaled $250,000.
F1	SE of Napoleonville	Assumption	LA	29.92°N 91°W	21:00–?	1 mi (1.6 km)	100 yd (91 m)	A tornado touched down and damaged some buildings and a lot of sugarcane near the towns of Foley, Napoleonville, Ratliff, Elmwood, Madewood, Bertie, Rosedale, and Woodlawn. Losses totaled $250,000.
F2	Brink to Low Ground	Greensville, Emporia	VA	36.62°N 77.63°W	00:45–?	2 mi (3.2 km)	100 yd (91 m)	This strong, hopping tornado skipped between Brink and Low Ground. About 25 farm buildings, including three large tobacco farms, were heavily damaged or destroyed and about 100 trees were uprooted. Losses totaled $25,000. A witness reported the tornado as "a cone-shaped cloud that was picking up dirt and leaves; sounded like 20 or 30 big bombers flying right over the house."

=== Warner Robins, Georgia ===
Warner Robins, Georgia
- The tornado approaching Warner Robins

F4 tornado
- on the Fujita scale

Overall effects
- Casualties: 18 fatalities, 300 injuries
- Damage: $25 million

This catastrophic, violent F4 tornado was first observed as a funnel cloud 5 minutes before it touched down. It immediately became intense as it moved east-northeastward and caused major damage as it struck the city farm. It then tore through a large housing project just south of Downtown Warner Robins. Terrific winds that well exceeded 100 miles per hour (160 km/h) destroyed 275 apartment units, 65 homes, and 25 trailers while heavily damaging 84 other apartment units, and 135 other homes. There was also extensive destruction and damage to many other structures and property nearby with debris being hurled high into the air and scattered a 1/2 mi (0.80 km) or more away from the path of the tornado. The high death and injury toll was mainly caused by this as people were hit by flying bricks and other debris. The tornado was filmed as it passed through Robins Air Force Base before it dissipated shortly thereafter.

600 families were affected as the tornado severely damaged or destroyed 340 residences, many of which were obliterated. 1,000 other housing units received lesser damage as well. There were 18 deaths and 300 injuries and losses totaled a staggering $25 million. Hail as large as golf balls also accompanied the tornado, although the damage it caused was indistinguishable to the total losses. Grazulis listed 19 fatalities instead of the official 18 and listed the event as a long-tracked tornado that included the three other tornadoes produced by this supercell.

=== Millerville–Ashland, Alabama ===
Millerville–Ashland, Alabama
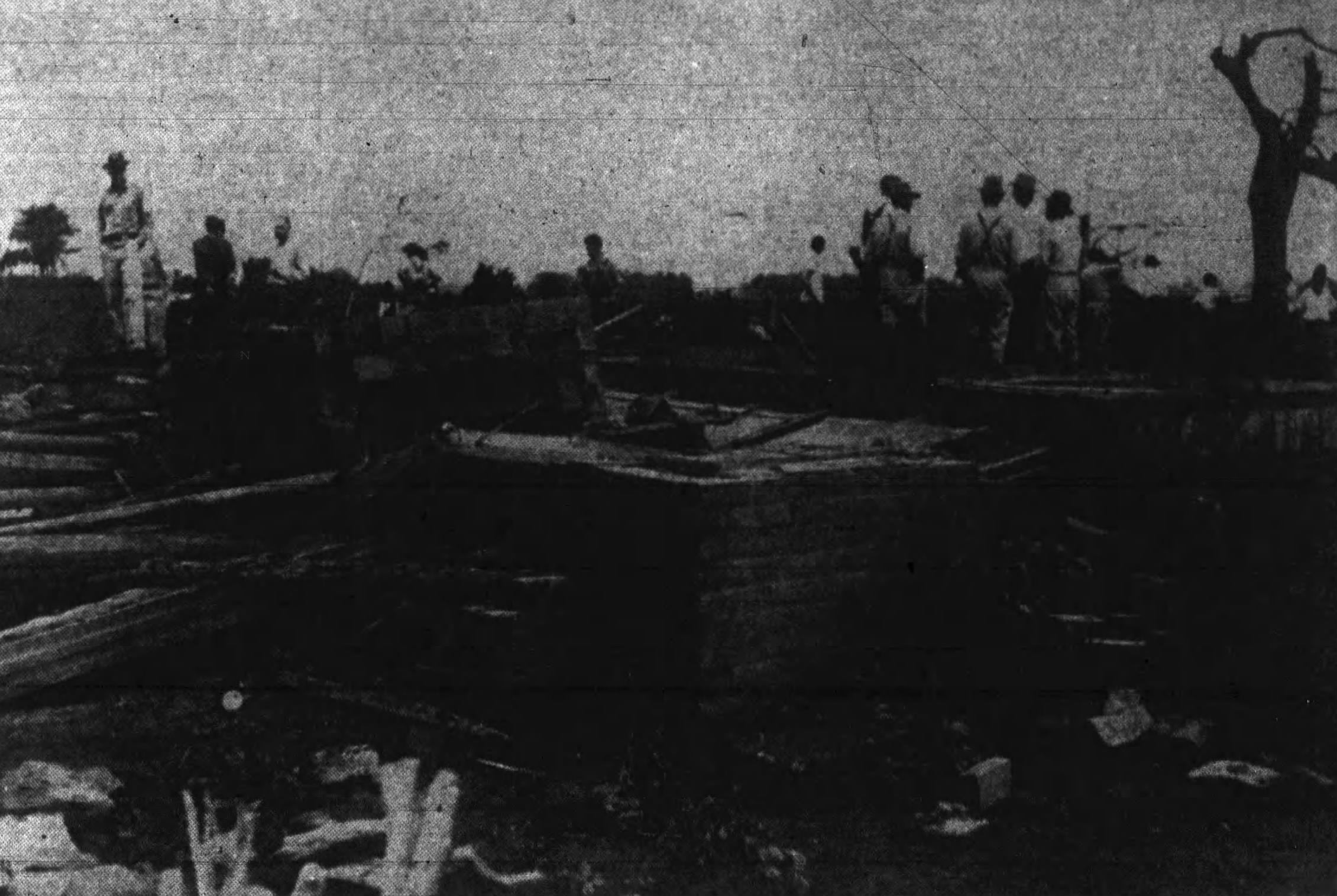
- A home that was destroyed south of Ashland.

F4 tornado
- on the Fujita scale

Overall effects
- Casualties: 7 fatalities, 12 injuries
- Damage: $250,000

This large, violent F4 tornado developed north of Millerville. It obliterated a frame home near its touchdown point, killing the two women inside, with one of the bodies being thrown over 100 yd (91 m). Moving northeastward, the tornado then struck a store in Haskins Crossroads along SR 9. Nine people in the store were saved when a pickup truck besides the store caught and held the roof of the building after a wall was blown in, although one woman was hospitalized due to a back injury. One of the occupants' home, which was right next to the store was obliterated and swept away while also damaging farm equipment and injuring cows. The tornado then weakened momentarily before becoming violent again south of Ashland, destroying several homes. Two people were critically injured in one the homes before dying at the hospital two hours later. Another house containing seven people was leveled, killing three people and critically injuring the four others. The tornado then weakened and dissipated just south of Lineville. Much of its path was along or parallel to SR 9.

In all, of the approximately 170 structures hit, 19 homes and 36 other buildings were destroyed, including a gas station that was leveled, while 50 other homes and 57 other buildings were damaged. Chickens were killed and stripped of their feathers as well. There were seven fatalities, 12 injures, and $250,000 in damage.

=== Decatur, Tennessee ===
Decatur, Tennessee
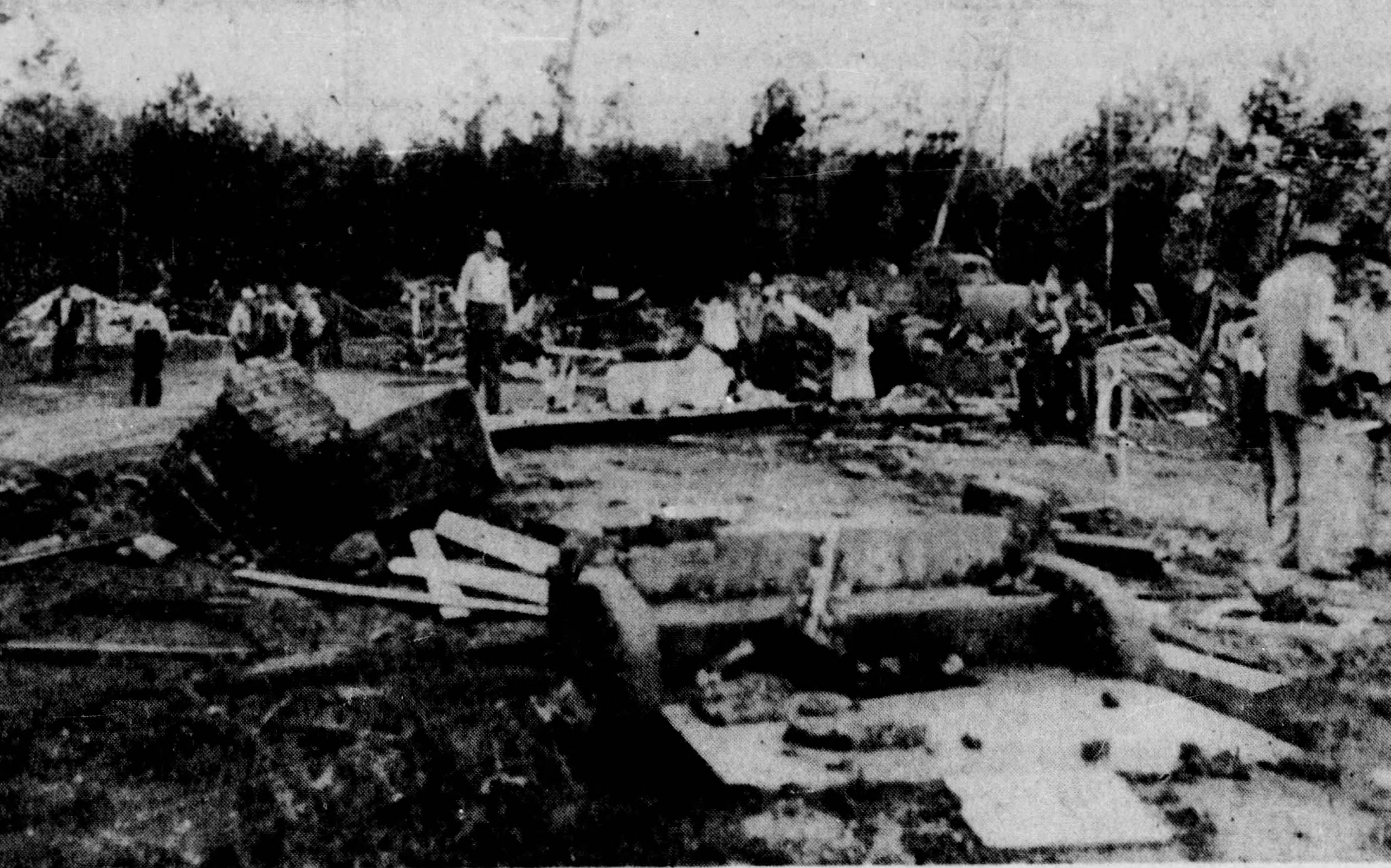
- A home in the Pleasant Grove Community that was destroyed by the tornado.

F4 tornado
- on the Fujita scale

Overall effects
- Casualties: 4 fatalities, 8 injuries
- Damage: $250,000

A squall line produced an 18 mi (29 km) long path of straight-line winds in Meigs and McMinn Counties, causing widespread damage. As the squall line passed through Decatur, this violent F4 tornado developed within it over the Decatur Ridge just east of Decatur and caused major damage as it moved northeastward through the No Pone Valley, affecting the communities of Idlewild and Niota. 205 structures were hit by the tornado with three homes and 55 farm buildings being destroyed, including a well built two-story home that was obliterated with debris scattered up to 1/2 mi (0.80 km) away. A total of 58 other homes and 89 farm buildings were damaged as well. The tornado crossed over Brickell Ridge east-southeast of Walnut Grove and dissipated near Niota.

Three of the four fatalities from the tornado were in one family and eight other people were injured, with losses totaling $250,000. According to Grazulis, the fourth death may have been unrelated to the tornado when a plane crashed because of the storm.

== Non-tornadic impacts ==
On April 28, the same storm that produced the Woodward, Oklahoma F0 tornado produced heavy wind damage on the south side of town with gust clocked at 80 miles per hour (130 km/h). On April 29, severe thunderstorms with torrential rainfall and high winds struck all of Louisiana. Rainfall peaked at 10 inches (250 mm) in Leesville while New Orleans saw heavy wind damage as trees, signs, and power and telephone lines were blown down. Several towns also saw homes, streets, and other properties flooded and several highways were closed. A washout caused five cars of the Southern Belle passenger train to derail near Montgomery, injuring 10. Three fatalities were also reported throughout the state and 1,000 people were evacuated from their homes in Alexandria due to flooding. This same line of storms moved through all of Mississippi, where similar impacts took place. One person was killed at Byhalta while two others were injured in Natchez by a landslide. 60 miles per hour (97 km/h) winds caused widespread tree and powerline damage and 50 families were evacuated from Jackson due to flooding. In Vicksburg, the site of a massive F5 tornado in December later that year, 7.25 inches (184 mm) of rain fell in only eight hours, leaving much of the region flooded out. Winds and heavy rain also caused damage in other parts of Mississippi, St. Louis, Missouri, which recorded up to 82 miles per hour (132 km/h), central and northern Illinois, and Alabama into April 30. Heavy rainfall and winds in Columbia, South Carolina led to several indirect injuries due to vehicle accidents while strong winds in Franklin, Indiana ripped a roof off of a packing plant and slammed it against a dwelling, injuring two of its occupants. A squall line moved throughout the Southeast and Mid-Atlantic at the beginning of May, bringing more damage due to wind, hail, heavy rain, and flooding across the region.

== Aftermath ==
The town of Warner Robins suffered catastrophic damage from the F4 tornado as numerous structures were flattened. At the time of the event, the city had 12 sirens, but none were located on Georgia/Robins AFB itself. Additionally, the radar technology at the time did not have the ability to detect the tornado. As a result, no formal tornado warning was issued and many people were caught off guard by its arrival. The Warner Robins F4 tornado was also one of the first tornadoes to ever be filmed. It was rumored that airman named Vince Rupert, an amateur cinematographer, was the one who captured it before being killed by flying debris. However, this information was proven to be just a myth as it actually filmed by Sgt. Lewis Prochniak, a Minnesota native and amateur film enthusiast. He took cover with his family just as the tornado was moving over his house and was not injured.

== See also ==
- List of North American tornadoes and tornado outbreaks
- May 1960 tornado outbreak sequence
- 1999 Oklahoma tornado outbreak

== Sources ==
- Brooks, Harold E. (April 2004). "On the Relationship of Tornado Path Length and Width to Intensity". Weather and Forecasting. 19 (2): 310–19. Bibcode:2004WtFor..19..310B. doi:10.1175/1520-0434(2004)019<0310:OTROTP>2.0.CO;2.
- Cook, A. R.; Schaefer, J. T. (August 2008). "The Relation of El Niño–Southern Oscillation (ENSO) to Winter Tornado Outbreaks". Monthly Weather Review. 136 (8): 3135. Bibcode:2008MWRv..136.3121C. doi:10.1175/2007MWR2171.1.
- Grazulis, Thomas P. (November 1990). Significant Tornadoes 1880–1989. Vol. 2. St. Johnsbury, Vermont: The Tornado Project of Environmental Films. ISBN 1-879362-02-3.
- Grazulis, Thomas P. (July 1993). Significant Tornadoes 1680–1991: A Chronology and Analysis of Events. St. Johnsbury, Vermont: The Tornado Project of Environmental Films. ISBN 1-879362-03-1.
- Grazulis, Thomas P. (2001a). The Tornado: Nature's Ultimate Windstorm. Norman: University of Oklahoma Press. ISBN 978-0-8061-3538-0.
- Grazulis, Thomas P. (2001b). F5-F6 Tornadoes. St. Johnsbury, Vermont: The Tornado Project of Environmental Films.
