= List of United States tornadoes from April to June 1954 =

List of tornadoes in the United States

This page documents all tornadoes confirmed by various weather forecast offices of the National Weather Service in the United States from April to June 1954. Further discussion can be found at Tornadoes of 1954.

== Confirmed tornadoes ==
- In addition to confirmed tornadoes, the Climatological Data National Summary listed the following, which are not officially listed as tornadoes:
  - A tornado destroyed a shed at Letchworth, in Prairie County, Arkansas, at 18:30 UTC on April 30.

=== April 25 event ===
List of confirmed tornadoes – Sunday, April 25, 1954 (Note: All dates are based on the local time zone where the tornado touched down; however, all times are in Coordinated Universal Time and dates are split at midnight CST/CDT for consistency.) (Note: Prior to 1994, only the average widths of tornado paths were officially listed.)
F#	Location	County / Parish	State	Start coord.	Time (UTC)	Path length	Max. width	Summary
F2	NNW of Holyrood	Ellsworth	KS	38.62°N 98.42°W	06:40–?	0.1 miles (0.16 km)	10 yards (9.1 m)	A strong tornado unroofed a shed. A portion of the roof was tossed over a house and left atop power lines. Losses were unknown. Tornado researcher Thomas P. Grazulis did not list the tornado as an F2 or stronger.
F1	Southern Brighton	Adams	CO	39.98°N 104.82°W	19:00–?	0.1 miles (0.16 km)	17 yards (16 m)	A tornado struck and damaged the roof of a house. Losses totaled $250.
F2	Gettysburg to Bonneauville to McSherrystown to Hanover	Adams, York	PA	39.83°N 77.23°W	22:30–23:00	13.3 miles (21.4 km)	500 yards (460 m)	This large, low-end F2 tornado, accompanied by high winds and heavy rain, hit multiple populated areas, causing $25,000 in damage. In Gettysburg the tornado damaged trees, utility wires, and small structures, clogging streets with debris and causing three vehicles to collide. Between McSherrystown and Hanover the tornado damaged TV antennae on 600 homes; one of the homes was unroofed as well. In the same area wires, chimneys, and trees were extensively impacted, as were storefront windows, unfinished walls, a pair of barn doors, and a barn.
F2	ESE of Collyer	Trego	KS	39.05°N 100.1°W	00:45–?	0.1 miles (0.16 km)	10 yards (9.1 m)	A strong tornado caused $25,000 in damage on a pair of farmsteads to the east-southeast and east of Collyer. Grazulis did not list the tornado as an F2 or stronger.

=== April 26 event ===
List of confirmed tornadoes – Monday, April 26, 1954
F#	Location	County / Parish	State	Start coord.	Time (UTC)	Path length	Max. width	Summary
F1	Council Bay	La Crosse, Trempealeau	WI	44°N 91.25°W	21:25–?	5.6 miles (9.0 km)	33 yards (30 m)	A tornado struck Camp Decorah, causing $2,500 in damage. Trees, utility lines, power poles, and a small cabin were destroyed or downed. A 40-foot-tall (12 m) tree was found 60 ft (18 m) from its original location. NCEI lists the path as extending from north of Holmen to north-northwest of Stevenstown.
F1	SSW of Clinton	Custer	OK	35.47°N 99°W	21:30–?	0.1 miles (0.16 km)	10 yards (9.1 m)	A weak tornado, attended by 1 1/2-inch-diameter (3.8 cm) hail, caused $30 in damage. Only a single farmstead was impacted.
F1	N of North Andover	Grant	WI	42.83°N 90.8°W	22:00–?	1.3 miles (2.1 km)	33 yards (30 m)	A tornado blew a chicken coop across a road, partly unroofed a barn, and unroofed a weigh house. A main barn incurred partial collapse of its end as well. Losses totaled $2,500. NCEI lists the path as extending from north-northeast of Five Points to northwest of Lancaster.
F2	N of Miller	Lyon	KS	38.07°N 95.98°W	22:20–?	1 mile (1.6 km)	20 yards (18 m)	A funnel-less but strong tornado, coincident with golfball-sized hail, uplifted a roof, shifted a barn, and downed several trees. Losses totaled $2,500. Grazulis did not list the tornado as an F2 or stronger. NCEI incorrectly lists this tornado as having occurred southeast of Lamont, in Greenwood County.
F2	SW of Royal to NW of Cornell	Clay	IA	43.05°N 95.3°W	23:23–?	8.4 miles (13.5 km)	10 yards (9.1 m)	Several funnel clouds were observed with this strong tornado touching down and damaging structures near Rossie. Losses totaled $250. Grazulis did not list the tornado as an F2 or stronger.
F0	E of Carnegie	Caddo	OK	35.1°N 98.55°W	00:00–00:05	1 mile (1.6 km)	50 yards (46 m)	A brief tornado touched down in an open field with no damage being reported.
F1	N of New Liberty	Scott	IA	41.75°N 90.88°W	01:30–?	0.1 miles (0.16 km)	10 yards (9.1 m)	A tornado struck a farmstead, damaging outbuildings and killing a cow. Losses totaled $2,500. No funnel cloud was seen, but a "roaring" sound was heard.

=== April 27 event ===
List of confirmed tornadoes – Tuesday, April 27, 1954
F#	Location	County / Parish	State	Start coord.	Time (UTC)	Path length	Max. width	Summary
F1	Antioch	Garvin	OK	34.73°N 97.40°W	08:00–?	0.1 miles (0.16 km)	33 yards (30 m)	A tornado damaged a trio of homes. Losses totaled $25,000.
F1	Westover	Clearfield	PA	40.75°N 78.67°W	20:00–?	1 mile (1.6 km)	67 yards (61 m)	A tornado moved directly through Westover, tossing goods off shelves in grocery stores, rocking buildings, smashing windows, and downing trees and wires. Losses totaled $250.
F1	SSW of Luther	Howard	TX	32.42°N 101.47°W	20:00–?	2 miles (3.2 km)	17 yards (16 m)	A tornado did slight damage in mostly open fields. Losses were unknown.
F2	Adena	Jefferson	OH	40.22°N 80.88°W	23:55–?	1 mile (1.6 km)	33 yards (30 m)	A strong tornado damaged a garage, three outbuildings, 12 homes, fuel tanks, plate glass, automobiles, chimneys, and trees. A man was injured in an apartment above the garage and losses totaled $250,000. Grazulis did not list the tornado as an F2 or stronger.
F0	Lake Creek	Greer	OK	35.03°N 99.42°W	00:30–?	0.1 miles (0.16 km)	33 yards (30 m)	A brief tornado killed or injured poultry and damaged chicken coops. Losses totaled $2,500.
F2	Ballinger to SW of Rowena	Runnels	TX	31.73°N 99.95°W	00:30–?	11.5 miles (18.5 km)	33 yards (30 m)	A tornado moved southwestward from Ballinger. It unroofed or otherwise damaged five homes. A garage was shifted and unroofed, windows were shattered, and a chicken coop was wrecked. Losses were unknown. The NCEI lists the endpoint as south-southeast of Olfen.

=== April 28 event ===
List of confirmed tornadoes – Wednesday, April 28, 1954
F#	Location	County / Parish	State	Start coord.	Time (UTC)	Path length	Max. width	Summary
F1	W of Vidalia	Concordia	LA	31.55°N 91.50°W	12:30–?	0.5 miles (0.80 km)	50 yards (46 m)	A funnel was observed damaging several homes. Losses totaled $25,000.
F1	S of Des Arc	Prairie	AR	34.92°N 91.50°W	18:30–?	0.1 miles (0.16 km)	33 yards (30 m)	The funnel from this tornado was observed from Letchworth. No damage was reported.
F0	NE of Atomic City	Butte	ID	43.50°N 112.72°W	19:20–?	0.1 miles (0.16 km)	33 yards (30 m)	A tornado affected open country at the National Reactor Testing Station. Losses totaled $30.
F1	NW of Cayote	Bosque	TX	31.78°N 97.47°W	23:00–?	2 miles (3.2 km)	100 yards (91 m)	A tornado shifted a home, severed an electrical wire, destroyed a pair of outbuildings, and unroofed a barn. Losses were unknown. NCEI listed one injury, but not the Climatological Data National Summary.
F1	Kendrick (1st tornado)	Alcorn	MS	34.92°N 88.58°W	01:00–?	0.1 miles (0.16 km)	33 yards (30 m)	This tornado and the following were a pair. Losses totaled $2,500.
F1	Kendrick (2nd tornado)	Alcorn	MS	34.92°N 88.58°W	01:00–?	0.1 miles (0.16 km)	33 yards (30 m)	This tornado and the preceding were a pair. Losses totaled $2,500.
F2	Walkertown	Hardin	TN	35.18°N 88.25°W	01:15–01:30	2 miles (3.2 km)	300 yards (270 m)	A brief but strong tornado unroofed a home and destroyed a store. A number of vehicles were damaged as well, along with the roofs of 25 other homes. Four people were injured and losses totaled $250,000. This and the preceding two tornadoes may have been part of the same storm.
F2	WNW of Fairview	Itawamba	MS	34.37°N 88.33°W	01:30–?	3.3 miles (5.3 km)	10 yards (9.1 m)	A strong tornado destroyed a home and unroofed another. Two people were injured and losses totaled $25,000.

=== April 29 event ===
List of confirmed tornadoes – Thursday, April 29, 1954
F#	Location	County / Parish	State	Start coord.	Time (UTC)	Path length	Max. width	Summary
F1	Norton to Hatchel	Runnels	TX	31.85°N 99.95°W	20:50–?	0.1 miles (0.16 km)	33 yards (30 m)	A brief tornado destroyed sheep enclosures and hurled a barn onto a house, damaging the latter. A woman was tossed by the wind and injured as a result. Losses were unknown.
F2	NW of Roll to S of Vici	Roger Mills, Ellis, Dewey	OK	35.80°N 99.75°W	21:00–?	33.3 miles (53.6 km)	33 yards (30 m)	A strong tornado skipped over rural countryside, tearing up a segment of blacktop near Arnett, before destroying various outbuildings and barns on five farmsteads. Losses totaled $25,000.
F1	Amorita	Alfalfa	OK	36.67°N 98.30°W	21:30–?	0.8 miles (1.3 km)	100 yards (91 m)	A brief tornado damaged a farmstead. Losses totaled $2,500.
F1	E of Hawley to W of Phantom Hill	Jones	TX	32.62°N 99.75°W	22:40–?	3.6 miles (5.8 km)	17 yards (16 m)	Unknown
F1	W of Camargo to Cestos	Dewey	OK	36.10°N 99.20°W	23:30–?	≥0.1 miles (0.16 km)	33 yards (30 m)	This tornado damaged several outbuildings. Losses totaled $30. The Climatological Data National Summary listed a loss of $900 and a 4-mile-long (6.4 km) path.
F2	SSE of Loyal	Kingfisher	OK	35.93°N 98.10°W	00:45–?	4.6 miles (7.4 km)	100 yards (91 m)	This tornado struck four farmsteads, destroying a barn. Two people were injured and losses totaled $25,000.
F0	NE of Valley Center	Sedgwick	KS	37.83°N 97.37°W	01:15–?	0.1 miles (0.16 km)	33 yards (30 m)	This tornado briefly touched down over open country. Losses were unknown.
F2	W of Yukon	Canadian	OK	35.50°N 97.80°W	03:00–?	2 miles (3.2 km)	33 yards (30 m)	This tornado affected four farms. Losses were unknown. Grazulis did not list the tornado as an F2 or stronger.
F1	E of Lawton	Comanche	OK	34.60°N 98.30°W	03:45–?	0.1 miles (0.16 km)	20 yards (18 m)	A brief tornado produced minimal damage. Losses totaled $30.

=== April 30 event ===
List of confirmed tornadoes – Friday, April 30, 1954
F#	Location	County / Parish	State	Start coord.	Time (UTC)	Path length	Max. width	Summary
F0	SW of Liberty	Montgomery	KS	37.30°N 95.70°W	05:00–?	0.8 miles (1.3 km)	50 yards (46 m)	This tornado damaged six farms. Losses totaled $2,500. Only a "loud roar" was perceived, not a funnel cloud. NCEI incorrectly lists the touchdown as south-southeast of Sycamore.
F1	NNE of Fairy to SSW of Iredell	Hamilton	TX	31.85°N 97.98°W	06:30–?	6.1 miles (9.8 km)	880 yards (800 m)	This tornado damaged 22 structures. Television antennae and windmills were downed as well. Losses totaled $25,000.
F1	NE of Maxwell	Pontotoc	OK	34.92°N 96.82°W	07:00–?	0.1 miles (0.16 km)	33 yards (30 m)	This tornado damaged three farmsteads. Losses totaled $2,500.
F1	S of Kyle to WSW of Lytton Springs	Hays, Caldwell	TX	29.98°N 97.88°W	11:37–?	15 miles (24 km)	67 yards (61 m)	A tornado damaged homes, outbuildings, TV antennas, and a gin. Losses totaled $250,000.
F3	S of Carlson to Beyersville to Gause to SSE of Grapeland	Travis, Williamson, Milam, Robertson, Leon, Houston	TX	30.42°N 97.45°W	12:10–?	139.9 miles (225.1 km)	880 yards (800 m)	See section on this tornado – Six people were injured and losses totaled $500,000. Grazulis listed the tornado as an F2.
F2	Northrup to Carmine to La Bahia to WSW of Union Hill	Lee, Fayette, Washington	TX	30.10°N 96.97°W	12:30–?	15.8 miles (25.4 km)	880 yards (800 m)	This large, relatively weak tornado wrecked barns and unroofed homes near Northrup and west of Ledbetter. The tornado reportedly caused some damage near Serbin as well, but besides Northrup only directly impacted two other communities, Carmine and La Bahia. Two people were injured and losses totaled $275,000. According to Grazulis, this tornado only affected Lee County; the rest of its path likely consisted of one or more separate, weaker tornadoes.
F2	S of Bryan	Brazos	TX	30.63°N 96.33°W	13:30–?	1.9 miles (3.1 km)	67 yards (61 m)	This tornado damaged a couple of churches and destroyed a few homes. Losses were unknown. NCEI lists the touchdown as southeast of Bryan.
F2	NNE of Groveton to Beulah to NNE of San Augustine	Trinity, Angelina, Nacogdoches, San Augustine	TX	31.07°N 95.12°W	14:00–?	68.8 miles (110.7 km)	883 yards (807 m)	This large, long-lived tornado family mostly generated weak spin-ups, except in Angelina County, at Beulah, where a rural school collapsed and a nearby home was unroofed. A pair of teachers and a few students at the school were hospitalized. In all, there were 25 injuries and $750,000 in losses. Neither Grazulis nor the Climatological Data National Summary included Nacogdoches County, though NCEI does and the official linear segment passes through the county.
F3	Southeastern Hugo	Choctaw	OK	34.00°N 95.52°W	15:30–?	1 mile (1.6 km)	150 yards (140 m)	An intense tornado moved northeastward through Hugo, causing extensive damage across 20 square blocks. At least 100 homes were leveled with 50 others being obliterated and swept away, leaving only a bare slab behind. About 200 phones were knocked out of service, trees were snapped, and utility lines were downed. There were 12 injuries, including one man that suffered serious back and chest injuries when his house collapsed around him, and $250,000 in damage. Grazulis listed the tornado as a low-end F3.
F3	Southern Lone Star, TX to Bodcaw, AR	Morris (TX), Cass (TX), Miller (AR), Lafayette (AR), Nevada (AR)	TX, AR	32.92°N 94.72°W	16:00–18:00	86.3 miles (138.9 km)	50 yards (46 m)	This intense, long-tracked tornado first destroyed or severely damaged five structures at Lone Star. It then unroofed a barn and tore a home off its foundation in Atlanta. A pair of barns and a home were also damaged at Bloomburg. After crossing into Arkansas, the tornado caused further damage to property at Fouke and Bodcaw. One person was injured and losses totaled $52,500. Grazulis did not list the tornado as an F2 or stronger.
F3	SW of College Hill, TX to Hot Springs, AR	Bowie (TX), Little River (AR), Sevier (AR), Howard (AR), Pike (AR), Hot Spring (AR), Garland (AR)	TX, AR	33.40°N 94.63°W	16:30–18:54	111.6 miles (179.6 km)	1,760 yards (1,610 m)	See section on this tornado – Two people were injured and losses totaled $775,000. Grazulis listed the tornado as an F2.
F1	W of Stigler	Haskell	OK	35.25°N 95.17°W	16:45–?	0.1 miles (0.16 km)	33 yards (30 m)	This brief tornado damaged a rural schoolhouse. Losses totaled $2,500.
F1	Southern Fort Smith	Sebastian	AR	35.33°N 94.42°W	17:10–?	0.1 miles (0.16 km)	33 yards (30 m)	This tornado damaged a number of trees and structures at Cavanaugh. Losses totaled $2,500.
F3	SSW of Natural Dam to Greenland to Harris to Goshen	Crawford, Washington	AR	35.63°N 94.40°W	17:55–18:25	40.7 miles (65.5 km)	440 yards (400 m)	This long-tracked tornado destroyed or damaged chicken coops near Goshen. One person was injured and losses totaled $1 million. Grazulis did not list the tornado as an F2 or stronger.
F1	S of Atkins	Pope	AR	35.23°N 92.93°W	18:00–?	0.5 miles (0.80 km)	50 yards (46 m)	A tornado was confirmed near Atkins, although no damage information is available.
F1	Hartman to W of Clarksville	Johnson	AR	35.45°N 93.58°W	18:30–?	6.9 miles (11.1 km)	100 yards (91 m)	This tornado extensively damaged farmland, affecting chicken coops and poultry. Losses totaled $25,000. NCEI lists the path as extending from north of Hinkle to the northern outskirts of Clarksville, passing through Shady Grove.
F1	S of Pasley to N of Smalleys Corner	Barry	MO	36.58°N 93.90°W	19:00–?	7.3 miles (11.7 km)	50 yards (46 m)	This tornado occurred between Roaring River State Park and Cassville. Outbuildings, small machinery, and trees were damaged or shredded. Losses totaled $25,000.
F2	Negreet to SE of Many	Sabine	LA	31.50°N 93.60°W	19:30–?	16.7 miles (26.9 km)	100 yards (91 m)	1 death – This strong tornado destroyed a barn and home, scattering their debris for 100 yd (300 ft). Six homes nearby were damaged as well. The body of the dead was found "wrapped around a fencepost." Six people were injured and losses totaled $25,000.
F0	Southwestern Bartow	Polk	FL	27.88°N 81.85°W	20:00–?	0.1 miles (0.16 km)	33 yards (30 m)	This tornado damaged a pair of roofs. Losses totaled $2,500.
F2	E of Versailles to W of Excelsior	Morgan	MO	38.43°N 92.83°W	20:00–?	3.6 miles (5.8 km)	400 yards (370 m)	This tornado destroyed outbuildings, barns, and a two-story home. Losses totaled at least $30. Both the Climatological Data National Summary and Grazulis listed one injury, that of a woman struck by airborne debris. Grazulis also noted $45,000 in losses.
F1	N of Royal	Winn	LA	32°N 92.45°W	20:30–?	0.5 miles (0.80 km)	33 yards (30 m)	Losses totaled $25,000.
F2	W of Driftwood to Beech Grove	Lawrence, Greene	AR	35.97°N 91.27°W	21:15–22:00	38.8 miles (62.4 km)	100 yards (91 m)	This tornado wrecked barns and caused severe damage to roofing and porches. It tracked through Arbor Grove, the northwestern part of Hoxie, and Walnut Ridge before ending at Beech Grove. Losses totaled $25,000.
F2	E of Franklin to SSW of Lowden	Lee, Henry, Des Moines, Louisa, Muscatine, Cedar	IA	40.67°N 91.50°W	21:15–?	85.2 miles (137.1 km)	200 yards (180 m)	1 death – This long-tracked tornado family damaged at least 20 farmsteads, unroofing a pair of homes. One or more barns and a chicken coop were destroyed as well. Nine people were injured and losses totaled $275,000. The NCEI only lists a single injury and no fatality, but both the Climatological Data National Summary and Grazulis list the fatality and nine injuries. Grazulis split the event into twin F2 tornadoes with 18-mile (29 km) and 20-mile-long (32 km) paths, respectively.
F2	NNE of Riggs to SSE of Clark City	Boone, Audrain, Monroe, Shelby, Lewis, Clark	MO	39.20°N 92.33°W	21:15–?	89.6 miles (144.2 km)	100 yards (91 m)	Another long-tracked tornado family impacted at least 34 farmsteads, damaging or destroying numerous outbuildings, several homes, and at least three barns. The tornado passed through or near Holliday, Granville, Steffenville, and Lewistown. Losses totaled $75,000.
F2	Northern West Monroe	Ouachita	LA	32.53°N 92.15°W	21:30–?	1 mile (1.6 km)	67 yards (61 m)	This tornado destroyed a home and a water plant. Other structures were badly damaged as well. One person was injured and losses totaled $250,000.
F2	Northern Williamsburg to E of Delaware	Iowa, Benton, Linn, Delaware	IA	41.67°N 92.00°W	01:00–?	65.8 miles (105.9 km)	200 yards (180 m)	This long-tracked tornado produced its main damage southeast of Ryan. Losses were unknown. Grazulis did not list the tornado as an F2 or stronger.
F4	W of Toddville to Eastern Garber to SSW of Harpers Ferry	Linn, Buchanan, Delaware, Clayton, Allamakee	IA	42.10°N 91.75°W	01:00–02:30	80.4 miles (129.4 km)	200 yards (180 m)	This long-tracked tornado leveled homes between Alburnett and Lafayette. Other homes were unroofed and barns were destroyed southwest of Manchester. A farmstead near Dundee was stripped of its outbuildings, a barn, and a kitchen. Business establishments and homes were ripped apart and unroofed in Garber as well. Losses were unknown. The tornado was listed by Grazulis as a family of at least four tornadoes, with seven injuries.
F2	Monticello to SSE of Dyersville	Jones, Delaware, Dubuque	IA	42.22°N 91.20°W	01:05–01:30	16.6 miles (26.7 km)	50 yards (46 m)	This tornado wrecked barns and outbuildings on eight farmsteads, primarily between Worthington and Dyersville. Losses were unknown.
F2	NNE of Lamont	Buchanan	IA	42.63°N 91.63°W	01:30–?	1 mile (1.6 km)	200 yards (180 m)	A farm was obliterated, except for its farmhouse. Seven farmsteads sustained damage in Buchanan County. Losses were unknown.
F1	E of Pulaski to SW of Forest	Scott	MS	32.27°N 89.58°W	04:00–?	6.8 miles (10.9 km)	33 yards (30 m)	This tornado struck only forested land in the Bienville National Forest. Losses were unknown.

== Sources ==
- Brooks, Harold E. (April 2004). "On the Relationship of Tornado Path Length and Width to Intensity". Weather and Forecasting. 19 (2). Boston: American Meteorological Society: 310–19. Bibcode:2004WtFor..19..310B. doi:10.1175/1520-0434(2004)019<0310:OTROTP>2.0.CO;2.
- Cook, A. R.; Schaefer, J. T. (August 2008). Written at Norman, Oklahoma. "The Relation of El Niño–Southern Oscillation (ENSO) to Winter Tornado Outbreaks". Monthly Weather Review. 136 (8). Boston: American Meteorological Society: 3135. Bibcode:2008MWRv..136.3121C. doi:10.1175/2007MWR2171.1.
- Grazulis, Thomas P. (November 1990). Significant Tornadoes 1880–1989. Vol. 2. St. Johnsbury, Vermont: The Tornado Project of Environmental Films. ISBN 1-879362-02-3.
- Grazulis, Thomas P. (July 1993). Significant Tornadoes 1680–1991: A Chronology and Analysis of Events. St. Johnsbury, Vermont: The Tornado Project of Environmental Films. ISBN 1-879362-03-1.
- Grazulis, Thomas P. (2001a). The Tornado: Nature's Ultimate Windstorm. Norman, Oklahoma: University of Oklahoma Press. ISBN 978-0-8061-3538-0.
- Grazulis, Thomas P. (2001b). F5-F6 Tornadoes. St. Johnsbury, Vermont: The Tornado Project of Environmental Films.
- National Weather Service (April–June 1954). Storm Data Publication (Report). National Centers for Environmental Information – via Storm Events Database.
- U.S. Weather Bureau (April 1954). "Storm data and unusual weather phenomena". Climatological Data National Summary. 5 (4). Asheville, North Carolina: National Climatic Data Center: 106–115.
- U.S. Weather Bureau (May 1954). "Storm data and unusual weather phenomena". Climatological Data National Summary. 5 (5). Asheville, North Carolina: National Climatic Data Center: 138–41.
