= Powersville =

Powersville may refer to:

- Powersville, Georgia
- Powersville, Iowa
- Powersville, Kentucky
- Powersville, Missouri
