= Tornado outbreak of December 5, 1954 =

Weather event in the United States

Meteorological history
- Formed: December 5, 1954

Tornado outbreak
- Tornadoes: 14
- Max. rating: F3 tornado
- Duration: 5 hours and 30 minutes

Overall effects
- Fatalities: 2
- Injuries: 125
- Damage: $2.710 million (1954 USD)
- Areas affected: Eastern Alabama, Western Georgia
- Part of the tornado outbreaks of 1954

A destructive and deadly tornado outbreak tore through Eastern Alabama and Western Georgia during the afternoon of December 5, 1954. A total of 14 tornadoes were confirmed, 10 of which were significant (F2+), including one that hit Metro Atlanta. Two people were killed, 125 others were injured, and damages total $2.710 million (1954 USD).

== Meteorological synopsis ==
A low-pressure system formed over the Southeastern Colorado and moved southeastward into the Southeastern United States the next day, triggering a severe weather outbreak.

== Confirmed tornadoes ==
Confirmed tornadoes by Fujita rating
FU	F0	F1	F2	F3	F4	F5	Total
0	0	4	8	2	0	0	14

Daily statistics of tornadoes produced by the tornado outbreak of December 5, 1954
Date	Total	Fujita scale rating							Deaths	Injuries	Damage	Ref.
Date	Total	FU	F0	F1	F2	F3	F4	F5	Deaths	Injuries	Damage	Ref.
December 5	14	0	0	4	8	2	0	0	2	125	$2,710,000	
Total	14	0	0	4	8	2	0	0	2	125	$2,710,000	

Outbreak death toll
State	Total	County	County total
Georgia	2	Stewart	1
Georgia	2	Fulton	1
Totals	2		
All deaths were tornado-related

List of confirmed tornadoes – Sunday, December 5, 1954 (Note: All dates are based on the local time zone where the tornado touched down; however, all times are in Coordinated Universal Time for consistency.) (Note: Prior to 1994, only the average widths of tornado paths were officially listed.)
F#	Location	County / Parish	State	Start coord.	Time (UTC)	Path length	Max. width	Summary
F3	Roanoke Junction, AL to Pine Mountain Valley, GA to Manchester, GA	Lee (AL), Harris (GA), Meriwether (GA)	AL, GA	32.68°N 85.42°W	18:00–20:30	51 miles (82 km)	200 yards (180 m)	This skipping, long-tracked, intense tornado, which was likely a tornado family, touched down northwest of Opelika, hitting the towns of Roanoke Junction and Mechanicsville before moving into Georgia at Barlett's Ferry. It then hit the towns of Antioch, Hamilton, Pine Mountain Valley, Nebula, Bussey Crossroads, Bulloch Crossroads, and Manchester before dissipating. In Alabama, a total of 11 homes were destroyed, 64 others were damaged, 33 other buildings were damaged, and a chicken farm was heavily damaged. Additionally, the tornado damaged more than 100 structures in Manchester, Georgia. Seven people were injured and damages were estimated at $750,000. (Note: All losses are in 1954 USD unless otherwise noted.) Tornado researcher Thomas P. Grazulis assessed the tornado as having caused F2-level damage.
F3	Ohatchee to Wellington to Piedmont	Calhoun	AL	33.78°N 86.00°W	19:30–?	24.7 miles (39.8 km)	100 yards (91 m)	A strong tornado started in Ohatchee, hitting the towns of West Wellington, Wellington, Angel, West Point, Merrellton, Possum Trot, Maxwellborn, Price, and Piedmont Springs before dissipating as it was passing through Piedmont. A total of 37 homes were destroyed and 50 others were damaged. Additionally, 15 other buildings were destroyed and 28 others were damaged. A total of 26 people were injured and damages were estimated at $250,000. Multiple other strong, killer tornadoes later struck this same general area on March 27, 1994, April 27, 2011, and March 25, 2021.
F2	Northern Blakely to N of Bancroft	Early	GA	31.38°N 84.93°W	19:30–?	6.4 miles (10.3 km)	250 yards (230 m)	A strong tornado grazed the north side of Blakely and traveled through swamps to north of Bancroft, where most of the damage occurred. Six homes and a church were damaged or destroyed, a truck was crumpled up, stored crops were blown away, utility services were disrupted, and many trees were blown down. Two people were injured and losses totaled $250,000. The CDNS report did not list any casualties.
F2	NE of Clayton, AL to Lumpkin, GA to Ellaville, GA	Barbour (AL), Quitman (GA), Stewart (GA), Webster (GA), Marion (GA), Schley (GA)	AL, GA	31.93°N 85.38°W	19:45–22:00	71.5 miles (115.1 km)	100 yards (91 m)	1 death – See section on this tornado – There were 35 injuries and $1.5025 million in damage.
F1	Stewart Woods	Douglas	GA	33.70°N 84.75°W	21:00–?	0.2 miles (0.32 km)	100 yards (91 m)	This tornado caused $2,500 in damages south of Douglasville.
F2	ENE of Zellobee to Buena Vista	Marion	GA	32.30°N 84.58°W	21:00–?	7.4 miles (11.9 km)	150 yards (140 m)	A strong tornado moved straight through Buena Vista. A number of outbuildings and 11 homes were destroyed or damaged. Seven people were injured and losses totaled $25,000.
F2	Taylorsville to Stilesboro	Bartow	GA	34.08°N 85.00°W	21:00–?	7.1 miles (11.4 km)	500 yards (460 m)	A strong tornado moved directly through both Taylorsville and Stilesboro. A couple of homes, six barns, and three warehouses were damaged or destroyed, along with transmission towers. Timberland incurred extensive damage as well. Losses totaled $25,000.
F1	SSW of Centerville to NNW of Wesley	Talbot	GA	32.68°N 84.42°W	21:10–?	4.1 miles (6.6 km)	80 yards (73 m)	This tornado began east of Talbotton. A few small homes were destroyed well south of the rural community of Ypsilanti/Redbone. Six injuries occurred and losses amounted to $2,500. Grazulis classified the tornado as an F2.
F1	Hulett	Carroll	GA	33.60°N 84.98°W	21:30–?	4.5 miles (7.2 km)	200 yards (180 m)	This tornado moved directly through Hulett where many barns, a church, and a home were unroofed or destroyed. Losses reached $25,000. Grazulis classified the tornado as an F2.
F1	E of Shellhorn	Pike	AL	31.88°N 86.07°W	22:00–?	1.5 miles (2.4 km)	83 yards (76 m)	Four homes and a barn were damaged or destroyed. Two injuries occurred and losses totaled $2,500. Grazulis classified the tornado as a low-end F2.
F2	Salem	Russell	AL	32.45°N 85.28°W	22:00–?	0.1 miles (0.16 km)	10 yards (9.1 m)	This short-lived tornado was reported by a pilot patrolling power lines west of Crawford. Three homes that were close together were destroyed and a power line was downed. Losses reached $25,000.
F2	NW of Bronwood	Terrell	GA	31.83°N 84.40°W	22:10–?	2.7 miles (4.3 km)	200 yards (180 m)	This tornado damaged three farms and destroyed a home. Losses totaled $25,000.
F2	Lucile	Early, Miller	GA	31.23°N 84.93°W	22:30–?	2.7 miles (4.3 km)	100 yards (91 m)	This tornado moved through Lucile, where three homes and a few barns were extensively damaged or destroyed. Losses amounted to $25,000.
F2	Sylvan Hills	Fulton	GA	33.70°N 84.43°W	23:30–?	0.5 miles (0.80 km)	50 yards (46 m)	1 death – This tornado affected the Sylvan Hills community in Southwestern Atlanta and also passed near Fort McPherson. Seven homes were wrecked or unroofed. A total of 40 people were injured and losses totaled $25,000.

=== Clayton–Howe, Alabama/Lumpkin–Ellaville, Georgia ===
Clayton–Howe, Alabama/Lumpkin–Ellaville, Georgia
F2 tornado
- on the Fujita scale

Overall effects
- Fatalities: 1
- Injuries: 35
- Damage: $1.5025 million (1954 USD)
- Areas affected: Southeastern Alabama and Southwestern Georgia

The first fatal tornado of the outbreak was this strong F2 tornado–which was likely a tornado family–that touched down north of Clayton, Alabama. It headed due east, clipping the northwest side of Eufaula before hitting the town of Howe and moving into Georgia. Throughout Barbour County, Alabama, the tornado injured three and caused $2,500 in damage, although what was damaged in the county is unknown.

The tornado then entered Quitman County, Georgia well to the north of Georgetown and began to curve northeastward. Damage here was mainly limited to trees before the tornado moved into Stewart County, where the worst effects from the tornado were felt. There were no casualties in Quitman County, but there was $250,000 in damage.

Upon entering Stewart County, the tornado hit town of Sanford, where some damage occurred. It then continued northeastward through rural areas before causing some of its worst damage as it tore through the northwest side of Lumpkin in Shady Grove. Several homes and smaller buildings were damaged and a fire lookout tower was toppled. The tornado then moved back into rural areas, continuing to damage or down hundreds of trees before striking Pleasant Valley. A home, church, and several smaller buildings were destroyed while other buildings along trees were damaged. Utility lines were blown down and some crops in storage lost. Throughout the town, one person was killed, three others were injured, losses totaled $15,000. The tornado then struck the town of Red Hill as it passed to the north of Richland with the funnel cloud being observed and a roaring sound like several jet planes in motion were heard. Two homes and a few smaller buildings were demolished, several others were severely damaged, including four automobiles, a tractor, and a trailer, and a large amounts of crops in storage were blown away. There were 16 injures and $35,000 in losses in town. Throughout Stewart County, the tornado killed one, injured 20, and caused $250,000 in damage.

The tornado then entered Webster County, where it turned more to the east and moved through rural areas as it approached the town of Church Hill. It then struck the town as it was moving into Marion County, demolishing one home and heavily damaging several other buildings, including a church. Throughout the town, there were $10,000 in losses and eight people were injured. Hundreds of trees continued to be damage as the tornado continued on its path. Throughout, Webster County, the tornado injured eight and caused $250,000 in damage. An additional $250,000 in damage also occurred in Marion County.

The tornado then moved into Schley County. After moving due east, it abruptly made a left turn northwest of Shiloh and traveled north-northeast, taking it directly into Ellaville. Just outside the latter place, the tornado wrecked five homes. Damage was inflicted throughout the town and dozen of trees were downed before the tornado finally dissipated as it was exiting town. Throughout Schley County, the tornado injured four and caused $500,000 in damage.

The tornado (or tornado family) was on the ground for at least 2 hours and 15 minutes, traveled 71.5 miles (115.1 km), had a maximum width of 250 yards (230 m), and caused $1.5025 million (1954 USD) in damage. Two people were killed and 35 others were injured.

== See also ==
- List of North American tornadoes and tornado outbreaks
- Tornado outbreak of March 3, 2019
