= Kalamazoo, Nebraska =

Unincorporated community in Nebraska, U.S.

Coordinates: 41°49′45″N 97°38′25″W

Kalamazoo is an unincorporated community in Madison County, Nebraska, United States.

== History ==
Kalamazoo had a post office between 1874 and 1904. The community was likely named after Kalamazoo, Michigan. A large F4 tornado hit the town on May 30, 1954 causing major damage. The tornado ended up killing six and injuring 23.

== Geography ==
The elevation of Kalamazoo is 1,722 feet.

== Nearby cities and towns ==
Newman Grove, NE (8.9 miles SW) Newman Grove, NE (8.9 miles SW) Lindsay, NE (9.4 miles SSW) Madison, NE (9.6 miles E) Cornlea, NE (11 miles SSE)	Battle Creek, NE (12 miles N) Humphrey, NE (12.5 miles SE) Meadow Grove, NE (14.6 miles NNW) Tarnov, NE (16.4 miles SSE) Creston, NE (16.6 miles ESE)
