= Yantley, Alabama =

Unincorporated community in Alabama, United States

Yantley
- Unincorporated community
- Yantley's position in Alabama.
- Coordinates: 32°14′46″N 88°22′46″W
- Country: United States
- State: Alabama
- County: Choctaw
- Elevation: 279 ft (85 m)
- Time zone: UTC-6 (Central (CST))
  - Summer (DST): UTC-5 (CDT)
- GNIS feature ID: 154042

Yantley is an unincorporated community in Choctaw County, Alabama, United States.

== Tornado history ==
On May 1, 1953, a violent F4 tornado struck the town, killing two people and injuring three others. Almost 60 years, on April 27, 2011, another EF4 tornado hit Yantley, knocking down trees and power lines, and causing structural damage, as part of the 2011 Super Outbreak.
