= Georgia State Route 247 =

State highway in Georgia, United States

State Route 247
- Georgia State Route 247 highlighted in red

Route information
- Maintained by GDOT
- Length: 43.2 mi (69.5 km)

Major junctions
- South end: US 129 / US 341 / SR 11 north of Hawkinsville
- US 41 / SR 49 south of Macon; US 41 Bus. / US 129 / SR 49 in Macon; I-75 / SR 540 in Macon; US 80 / SR 22 in Macon; US 41 / US 41 Bus. / SR 19 in Macon; US 23 / SR 87 in Macon
- North end: I-75 in Macon

Location
- Country: United States
- State: Georgia
- Counties: Pulaski, Houston, Bibb

Highway system
- Georgia State Highway System; Interstate; US; State; Special
← SR 246	→ SR 248

State Route 247 (SR 247) is a 43.2-mile-long (69.5 km) south–north state highway located in the central part of the U.S. state of Georgia. Its routing is within portions of Pulaski, Houston, and Bibb counties. It originates in the northwestern part of Hawkinsville, and it concludes in the northwestern section of Macon.

== Route description ==
SR 247 commences at an intersection with US 129/US 341/SR 11 (Perry Highway) northwest of Hawkinsville, in Pulaski County. US 129/SR 247 head northwest concurrently, enter Houston County, and curve to the north at an intersection with SR 247 Spur, east of Perry. In Kathleen, Georgia is an intersection with SR 127. US 129/SR 247 meet SR 96 in Bonaire. In Warner Robins, across from Robins Air Force Base, is SR 247 Connector. The concurrency enters Bibb County before passing Middle Georgia Regional Airport a short distance south-southeast of an intersection with US 41/SR 11/SR 49. Those three highways join the concurrency to the north. The five highways later run through Rutland as they pass over a bridge for a former Central of Georgia Railway line, and then turn north again where they encounter an interchange with Houston Avenue, a former segment of US 41/SRs 11/49. From that point on, the street name along this concurrency is Houston Road. Later, the routes enters some marshland which includes bridges with Tobesofkee Creek and Rocky Creek before finally entering Macon, Georgia where it approaches a major intersection. US 41/SR 247 head to the northwest, Houston Avenue heads north, and US 129/SR 11/SR 49, as well as US 41 Business (which begins here), head to the northeast. US 41/SR 247 have an interchange with Interstate 75 (I-75) and SR 540. Farther to the north, they intersect US 80/SR 22, and then SR 74, before meeting US 41 Business/SR 19. There, US 41/SR 19 head northwest, while SR 247 heads north alone. It meets US 23/SR 87, just before meeting its northern terminus, a second interchange with I-75.

== Major intersections ==
County	Location	mi	km	Destinations	Notes
Pulaski		0.0	0.0	US 129 south / US 341 / SR 11 (Perry Highway)	Southern terminus; southern end of US 129 concurrency
Houston		13.4	21.6	SR 247 Spur south	Northern terminus of SR 247 Spur
Houston	Kathleen	15.5	24.9	SR 127 west	Eastern terminus of SR 127
Houston	Bonaire	19.3	31.1	SR 96 – Fort Valley, Jeffersonville	
Houston	Warner Robins	24.5	39.4	SR 247 Conn. west (Watson Boulevard) – Centerville	Eastern terminus of SR 247 Conn.
Bibb		32.8	52.8	US 41 south / SR 11 south / SR 49 south (Industrial Highway)	Southern end of US 41 and SR 11/SR 49 concurrencies; no access to US 41/SR 11/SR 49 south from US 129/SR 247 north
Bibb	Macon	35.9	57.8	US 41 Bus. north / US 129 north / SR 11 north / SR 49 north (Broadway)	Northern end of US 129 and SR 11/SR 49 concurrencies; southern terminus of US 41 Bus.
Bibb	Macon	37.1	59.7	I-75 (SR 401) / SR 540 (Fall Line Freeway) – Valdosta, Atlanta, Columbus	I-75 exit 160
Bibb	Macon	39.1	62.9	US 80 / SR 22 (Eisenhower Parkway)	
Bibb	Macon	39.8	64.1	SR 74 (Mercer University Drive) – Mercer University	
Bibb	Macon	41.2	66.3	US 41 north / US 41 Bus. south / SR 19 (Vineville Avenue)	Northern end of US 41 concurrency; northern terminus of US 41 Bus.
Bibb	Macon	43.1	69.4	US 23 / SR 87 (Riverside Drive)	
Bibb	Macon	43.2	69.5	I-75 (SR 401) – Atlanta	Northern terminus; I-75 exit 167
1.000 mi = 1.609 km; 1.000 km = 0.621 mi: Concurrency terminus

== Special routes ==
=== State Route 247 Spur ===
State Route 247 Spur
- Location: Perry
- Length: 3.1 mi (5.0 km)

State Route 247 Spur (SR 247 Spur) is a 3.1-mile-long (5.0 km) spur route connecting US 341/SR 11 southeast of Perry with US 129/SR 247 east of the city.

SR 247 Spur isn't part of the National Highway System, a system of roadways important to the nation's economy, defense, and mobility.

The entire route is in Houston County.

Location	mi	km	Destinations	Notes
	0.0	0.0	US 341 / SR 11 (Main Street) – Hawkinsville, Perry	Southern terminus
	3.1	5.0	US 129 / SR 247 – Hawkinsville, Macon	Northern terminus
1.000 mi = 1.609 km; 1.000 km = 0.621 mi

=== State Route 247 Connector ===
State Route 247 Connector
- Location: Powersville–Warner Robins
- Length: 11.5 mi (18.5 km)

State Route 247 Connector (SR 247 Connector) is a 11.5-mile-long (18.5 km) connecting route of SR 247 that connects SR 49/SR 540 northeast of Fort Valley (in the unincorporated community of Powersville) with US 129/SR 247 in Warner Robins.

SR 247 Conn. isn't part of the National Highway System, a system of roadways important to the nation's economy, defense, and mobility.

County	Location	mi	km	Destinations	Notes
Peach	Powersville	0.0	0.0	SR 49 (Peach Parkway) / SR 540 (Fall Line Freeway) – Fort Valley, Byron, Columbus	Western terminus
Peach		3.0	4.8	I-75 (SR 401) – Valdosta, Macon	I-75 exit 146
Houston		5.0	8.0	US 41 / SR 11 (Peach Blossom Trail)	
Houston	Warner Robins	11.6	18.7	US 129 / SR 247	Eastern terminus
1.000 mi = 1.609 km; 1.000 km = 0.621 mi
