= Clinchfield, Georgia =

Unincorporated community in Georgia, U.S.

- Unincorporated community
- Location within the state of Georgia Clinchfield (the United States)
- Coordinates: 32°24′49″N 83°38′18″W
- Country: United States
- State: Georgia
- County: Houston
- Elevation: 259 ft (79 m)
- Time zone: UTC-5 (Eastern (EST))
  - Summer (DST): UTC-4 (EDT)
- ZIP codes: 31069
- Area code: 478
- GNIS feature ID: 355193

Clinchfield is an unincorporated community in south-central Houston County, Georgia, United States. It lies near U.S. Route 341 at the junction of Georgia Highway 224. It is part of the Perry, Georgia Metropolitan Statistical Area. Clinchfield started as a place for the workers of the Penn-Dixie cement plant to live when the plant was constructed in the early 1920s. The cement plant is still in operation today and is currently owned by Cemex, Inc. A post office was established for Clinchfield and still operates today.
