= Grovania, Georgia =

Unincorporated community in Georgia, U.S.

Coordinates: 32°21′58″N 83°39′48″W

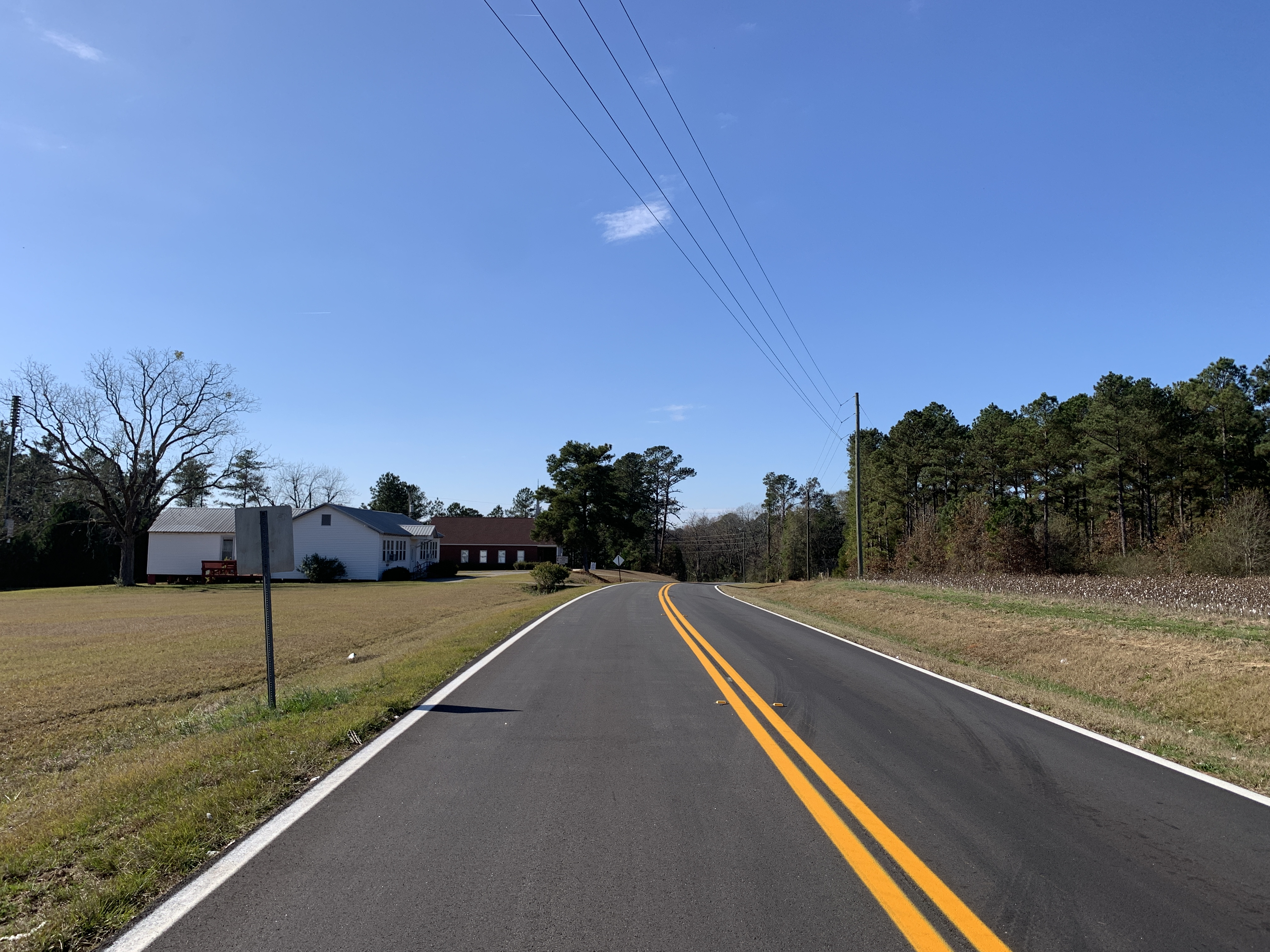
Grovania

Grovania is an unincorporated community in Houston County, in the U.S. state of Georgia.

== History ==
The community was named for groves of fruit trees near the original town site. A post office called Grovania was established in 1889, and remained in operation until 1952.

The Georgia General Assembly incorporated the place as the Town of Grovania in 1909. The town's municipal charter was dissolved in 1995 along with those of many other inactive Georgia municipalities.
