= Elberta, Georgia =

Unincorporated community in Georgia, U.S.

Coordinates: 32°39′34″N 83°37′08″W

Elberta is an unincorporated community located in northern Houston County, Georgia, United States. The community lies along State Route 247. It is part of the Warner Robins, Georgia Metropolitan Statistical Area.

Elberta was an incorporated municipality from 1958 until 1970. The community was named after the "Elberta peach" grown near the original town site.
