= Houston County, Georgia =

County in Georgia, United States

- County
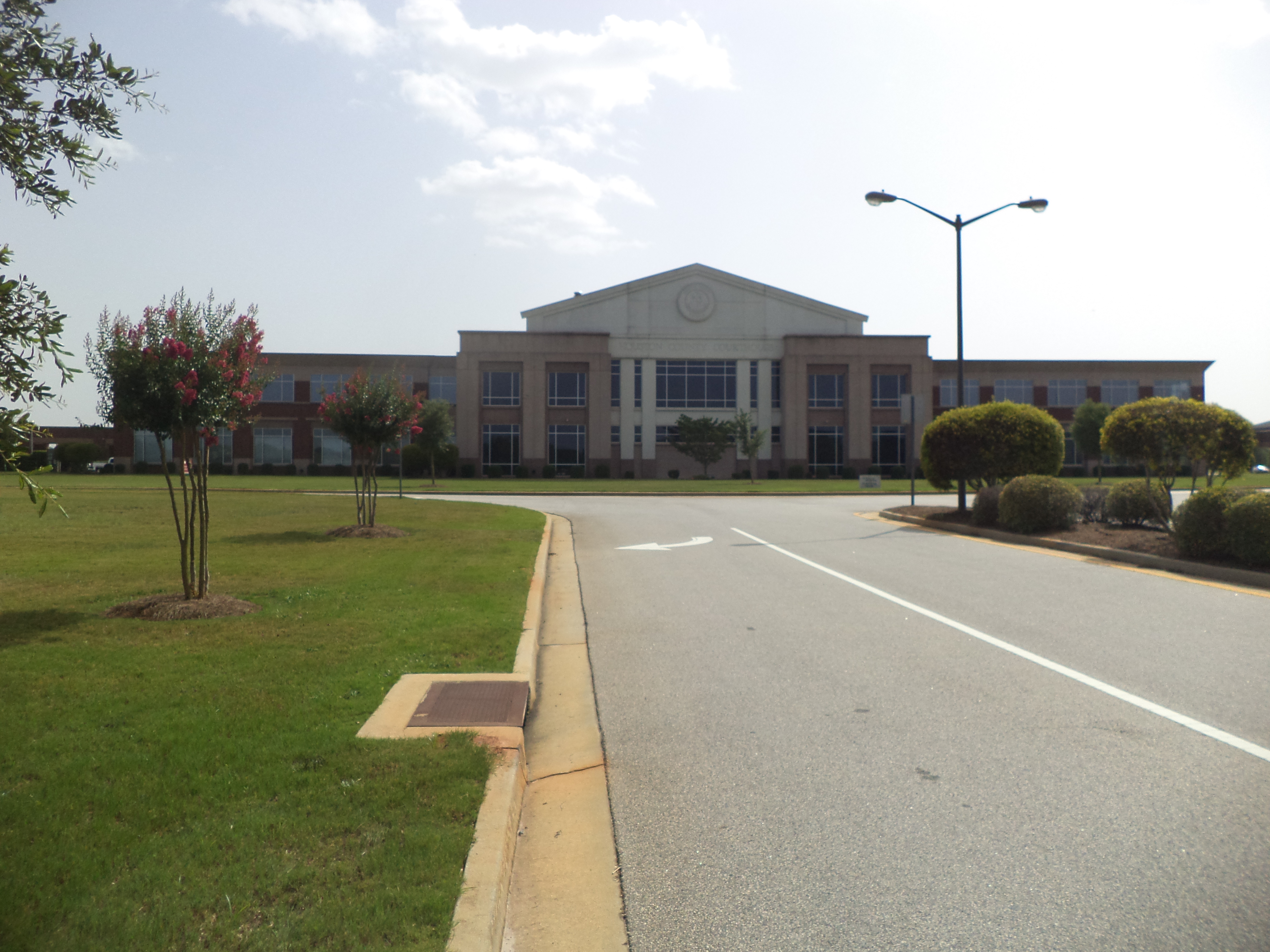
- Houston County courthouse in Perry

- Seal

- Location within the U.S. state of Georgia
- Coordinates: 32°28′N 83°40′W
- Country: United States
- State: Georgia
- Founded: May 15, 1821; 205 years ago
- Named for: John Houstoun
- Seat: Perry
- Largest city: Warner Robins

Area
  - Total: 380 sq mi (980 km^{2})
  - Land: 376 sq mi (970 km^{2})
  - Water: 4.4 sq mi (11 km^{2}) 1.2%

Population (2020)
  - Total: 163,633
  - Estimate (2025): 178,214 ▲
  - Density: 373/sq mi (144/km^{2})
- Time zone: UTC−5 (Eastern)
  - Summer (DST): UTC−4 (EDT)
- Congressional districts: 8th, 2nd
- Website: www.houstoncountyga.gov

Houston County (/ˈhaʊstən/ HOW-stən) is a county located in the central portion of the U.S. state of Georgia. The population was 163,633 at the 2020 census. Its county seat is Perry; the city of Warner Robins is substantially larger in both area and population.

The county was created on May 15, 1821, along with four other counties in the state, and later reduced in size with the formation of Bibb, Crawford, Pulaski, Macon, and Peach counties. It was named after Georgia governor John Houstoun, with the spelling being a common 19th-century variation that later evolved to "Houston". The pronunciation, however, remains to this day "howston." The geographic center of the county was given the name Wattsville, which was later changed to Perry.

Houston County is included in the Warner Robins, GA metropolitan statistical area, which in turn is included in the Macon-Warner Robins-Fort Valley combined statistical area. Flat Creek Public Fishing Area is in Houston County, south west of Perry.

== Geography ==
According to the U.S. Census Bureau, the county has a total area of 380 square miles (980 km^{2}), of which 376 square miles (970 km^{2}) is land and 4.4 square miles (11 km^{2}) (1.2%) is water. The county is located in the upper Atlantic coastal plain region of the state.

The vast majority of Houston County is located in the Lower Ocmulgee River sub-basin of the Altamaha River basin. The very northern edge of the county, north of Centerville and Warner Robins, is located in the Upper Ocmulgee River sub-basin of the same Altamaha River basin. The very southwestern corner of Houston County, well west of Interstate 75, is located in the Middle Flint River sub-basin of the ACF River Basin (Apalachicola-Chattahoochee-Flint River Basin).

=== Adjacent counties ===
- Bibb County - north
- Peach County - west
- Twiggs County - east
- Bleckley County - southeast
- Pulaski County - south-southeast
- Dooly County - south
- Macon County - southwest

== Communities ==
=== Cities ===
- Byron (Partially)
- Centerville
- Perry (Slightly extends into Peach County, Georgia)
- Warner Robins

=== Census-designated place ===
- Robins Air Force Base

=== Unincorporated communities ===
- Bonaire
- Clinchfield
- Dunbar - one mile east of U.S. Route 41 at the intersection of Dunbar and Houston Lake Roads.
- Elberta
- Elko
- Grovania
- Haynesville
- Kathleen
- Henderson

== Demographics ==
Historical population
Census	Pop.	Note	%±
1830	7,369		—
1840	9,711		31.8%
1850	16,450		69.4%
1860	15,611		−5.1%
1870	20,406		30.7%
1880	22,414		9.8%
1890	21,613		−3.6%
1900	22,641		4.8%
1910	23,609		4.3%
1920	21,964		−7.0%
1930	11,280		−48.6%
1940	11,303		0.2%
1950	20,964		85.5%
1960	39,154		86.8%
1970	62,924		60.7%
1980	77,605		23.3%
1990	89,208		15.0%
2000	110,765		24.2%
2010	139,900		26.3%
2020	163,633		17.0%
2025 (est.)	178,214	▲	8.9%
U.S. Decennial Census; 1790-1880 1890-1910; 1920-1930 1930-1940; 1940-1950 1960-1980; 1980-2000 2010

=== Racial and ethnic composition ===
Houston County, Georgia – Racial and ethnic composition Note: the US Census treats Hispanic/Latino as an ethnic category. This table excludes Latinos from the racial categories and assigns them to a separate category. Hispanics/Latinos may be of any race.
Race / Ethnicity (NH = Non-Hispanic)	Pop 1980	Pop 1990	Pop 2000	Pop 2010	Pop 2020	% 1980	% 1990	% 2000	% 2010	% 2020
White alone (NH)	60,050	67,175	76,391	84,703	86,211	77.38%	75.30%	68.97%	60.55%	52.69%
Black or African American alone (NH)	15,687	19,279	27,181	39,535	51,992	20.21%	21.61%	24.54%	28.26%	31.77%
Native American or Alaska Native alone (NH)	170	267	352	392	339	0.22%	0.30%	0.32%	0.28%	0.21%
Asian alone (NH)	476	993	1,727	3,360	4,905	0.61%	1.11%	1.56%	2.40%	3.00%
Native Hawaiian or Pacific Islander alone (NH)	x	x	67	96	124	x	x	0.06%	0.07%	0.08%
Other race alone (NH)	179	35	174	210	703	0.23%	0.04%	0.16%	0.15%	0.43%
Mixed race or Multiracial (NH)	x	x	1,510	3,089	7,552	x	x	1.36%	2.21%	4.62%
Hispanic or Latino (any race)	1,043	1,459	3,363	8,515	11,807	1.34%	1.64%	3.04%	6.09%	7.22%
Total	77,605	89,208	110,765	139,900	163,633	100.00%	100.00%	100.00%	100.00%	100.00%

=== 2020 census ===
As of the 2020 census, the county had a population of 163,633 in 62,115 households, including 39,810 families.

The median age was 36.4 years. 25.4% of residents were under the age of 18 and 13.7% of residents were 65 years of age or older. For every 100 females there were 93.0 males, and for every 100 females age 18 and over there were 89.7 males age 18 and over. 91.0% of residents lived in urban areas, while 9.0% lived in rural areas.

The racial makeup of the county was 54.1% White, 32.2% Black or African American, 0.4% American Indian and Alaska Native, 3.0% Asian, 0.1% Native Hawaiian and Pacific Islander, 3.0% from some other race, and 7.3% from two or more races. Hispanic or Latino residents of any race comprised 7.2% of the population.

There were 62,115 households in the county, of which 35.4% had children under the age of 18 living with them and 29.2% had a female householder with no spouse or partner present. About 25.8% of all households were made up of individuals and 8.9% had someone living alone who was 65 years of age or older.

There were 66,633 housing units, of which 6.8% were vacant. Among occupied housing units, 64.3% were owner-occupied and 35.7% were renter-occupied. The homeowner vacancy rate was 1.7% and the rental vacancy rate was 7.4%.

== Education ==
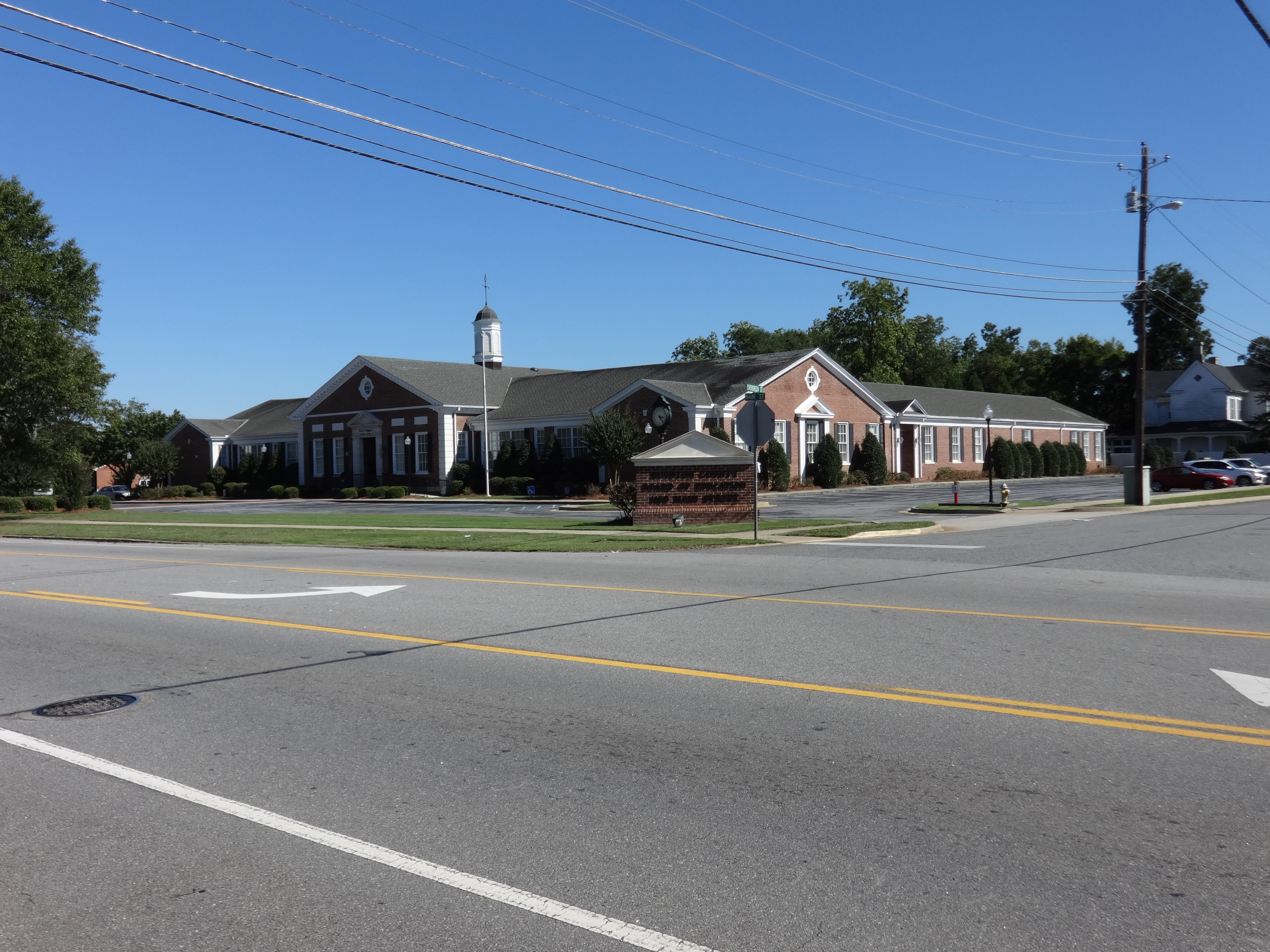
Houston County Schools headquarters

Houston County Schools operates public schools.

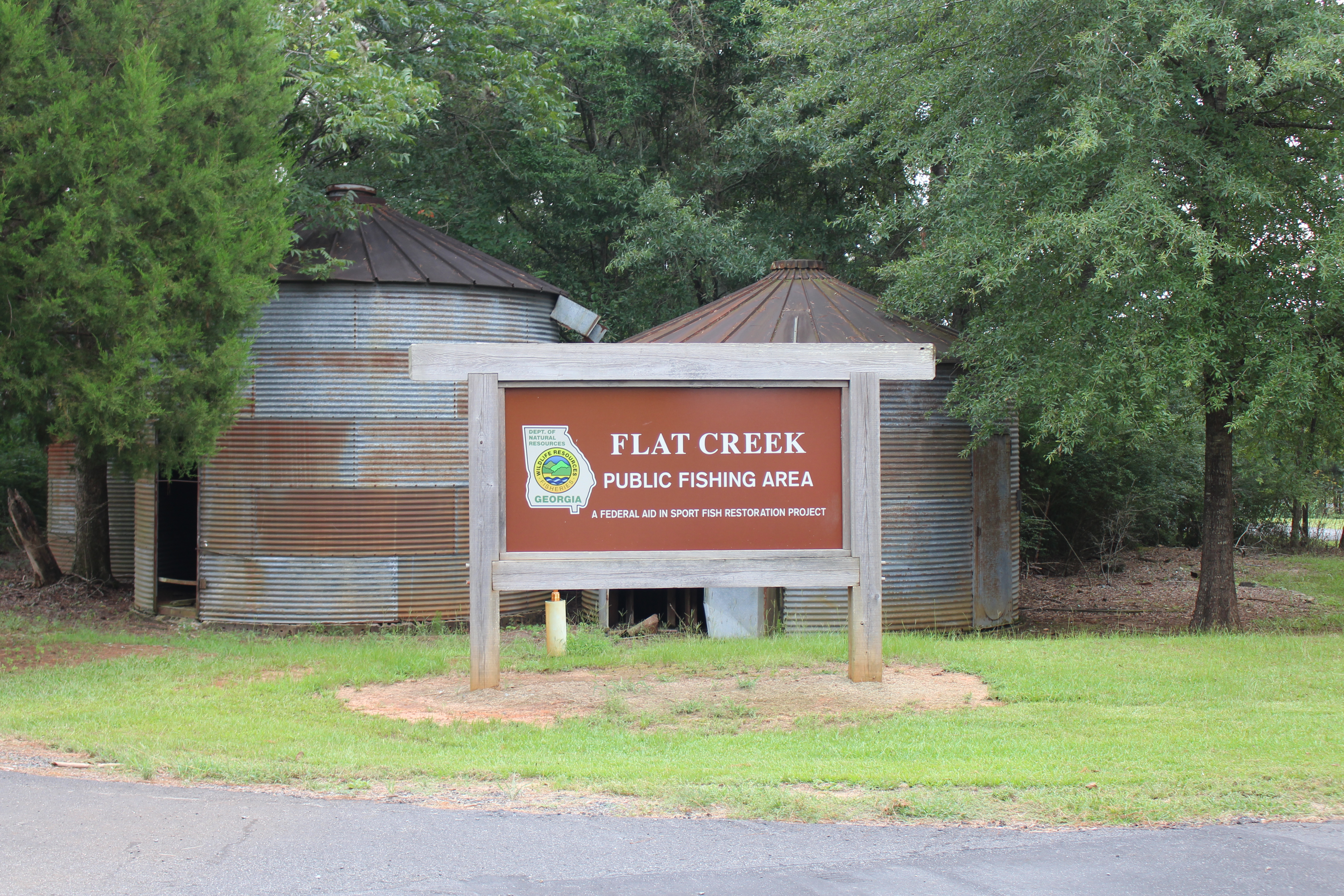
Flat Creek Public Fishing Area

== Politics ==
Houston County voted for conservative Democrats for most of the twentieth century, and gradually switched to voting for conservative Republicans closer to the century's end and into the twenty-first. In the 2018 gubernatorial election, while she did not carry Houston County, Stacey Abrams improved on Democratic margins in the county, improving five percent compared to Hillary Clinton's 2016 presidential run and by four percent compared to Barack Obama's 2008 run. Houston was one of five counties not carried by Abrams which improved their Democratic margins. In 2020, Joe Biden improved Democratic margins to their best since Jimmy Carter carried it in 1980. He also became the first non-Georgian Democrat to win 40 percent of the county's vote since 1960. In 2025, Democrats Peter Hubbard and Alicia Johnson became the first Democrats to carry Houston County in a statewide election since 1998. In 2026, Keisha Lance Bottoms became the first Democrat to carry Houston County for the governorship since 1998.

For elections to the United States House of Representatives, Houston County is divided between Georgia's 2nd congressional district and Georgia's 8th congressional district. For elections to the Georgia State Senate, Houston County is part of districts 18, 20, and 26. For elections to the Georgia House of Representatives, Houston County is part of districts 143, 146, 147 and 148.

United States presidential election results for Houston County, Georgia
Year	Republican		Democratic		Third party(ies)	
Year	No.	%	No.	%	No.	%
1880	909	39.68%	1,382	60.32%	0	0.00%
1884	433	24.99%	1,300	75.01%	0	0.00%
1888	466	32.86%	949	66.93%	3	0.21%
1892	507	20.48%	1,953	78.88%	16	0.65%
1896	192	17.63%	875	80.35%	22	2.02%
1900	81	9.11%	798	89.76%	10	1.12%
1904	78	8.99%	768	88.48%	22	2.53%
1908	27	2.58%	855	81.58%	166	15.84%
1912	24	3.00%	760	95.00%	16	2.00%
1916	52	5.98%	806	92.64%	12	1.38%
1920	39	5.12%	723	94.88%	0	0.00%
1924	75	4.39%	1,611	94.27%	23	1.35%
1928	92	22.17%	323	77.83%	0	0.00%
1932	27	5.54%	460	94.46%	0	0.00%
1936	37	4.44%	796	95.56%	0	0.00%
1940	149	19.30%	622	80.57%	1	0.13%
1944	190	26.21%	535	73.79%	0	0.00%
1948	204	9.85%	1,437	69.35%	431	20.80%
1952	511	15.48%	2,789	84.52%	0	0.00%
1956	1,060	19.12%	4,483	80.88%	0	0.00%
1960	1,757	30.35%	4,033	69.65%	0	0.00%
1964	6,532	60.53%	4,258	39.46%	1	0.01%
1968	4,285	29.64%	2,833	19.60%	7,339	50.76%
1972	13,576	84.16%	2,556	15.84%	0	0.00%
1976	5,404	29.10%	13,164	70.90%	0	0.00%
1980	9,005	43.51%	10,915	52.74%	775	3.74%
1984	14,255	60.71%	9,226	39.29%	0	0.00%
1988	15,748	64.02%	8,664	35.22%	185	0.75%
1992	14,119	43.11%	12,270	37.47%	6,359	19.42%
1996	17,050	52.18%	12,760	39.05%	2,868	8.78%
2000	23,174	62.65%	13,301	35.96%	513	1.39%
2004	29,862	66.03%	15,054	33.29%	310	0.69%
2008	33,392	59.59%	22,094	39.43%	548	0.98%
2012	34,662	59.58%	22,702	39.02%	811	1.39%
2016	35,430	58.65%	22,553	37.34%	2,423	4.01%
2020	41,540	55.48%	32,239	43.06%	1,093	1.46%
2024	45,090	55.32%	35,907	44.05%	517	0.63%

United States Senate election results for Houston County, Georgia2
Year	Republican		Democratic		Third party(ies)	
Year	No.	%	No.	%	No.	%
2020	41,428	55.86%	30,955	41.74%	1,779	2.40%
2020	36,779	55.40%	29,608	44.60%	0	0.00%

United States Senate election results for Houston County, Georgia3
Year	Republican		Democratic		Third party(ies)	
Year	No.	%	No.	%	No.	%
2020	22,327	30.23%	21,945	29.71%	29,591	40.06%
2020	36,644	55.19%	29,749	44.81%	0	0.00%
2022	32,239	54.65%	25,657	43.49%	1,095	1.86%
2022	29,437	54.47%	24,605	45.53%	0	0.00%

Georgia Gubernatorial election results for Houston County
Year	Republican		Democratic		Third party(ies)	
Year	No.	%	No.	%	No.	%
1966	5,887	57.26%	3,737	36.35%	657	6.39%
1970	5,614	43.90%	7,175	56.10%	0	0.00%
1974	4,154	32.10%	8,785	67.90%	0	0.00%
1978	1,584	16.29%	8,139	83.71%	0	0.00%
1982	6,240	35.63%	11,271	64.37%	0	0.00%
1986	3,366	22.54%	11,567	77.46%	0	0.00%
1990	8,844	42.69%	11,299	54.54%	575	2.78%
1994	11,509	49.55%	11,720	50.45%	0	0.00%
1998	12,491	46.60%	13,498	50.36%	813	3.03%
2002	20,311	67.19%	9,564	31.64%	354	1.17%
2006	21,395	68.92%	8,697	28.02%	950	3.06%
2010	22,156	57.36%	14,833	38.40%	1,638	4.24%
2014	22,168	59.36%	14,335	38.38%	844	2.26%
2018	34,314	57.93%	24,358	41.12%	560	0.95%
2022	34,842	58.84%	23,928	40.41%	440	0.74%
2026	32,193	49.59%	32,731	50.41%	0	0.00%

== Transportation ==
=== Major highways ===
- I-75 / SR 401 – SR 401 is the unsigned designation for I-75
- US 41
- US 129 / SR 247
  - SR 247 Conn. (Warner Robins)
  - SR 247 Spur (Perry)
- US 341
- SR 7
  - SR 7 Conn. (Perry)
- SR 11
  - SR 11 Bus. (Perry)
  - SR 11 Conn. (Perry)
- SR 26
- SR 49
- SR 96
- SR 127
- SR 224
- SR 329

=== Pedestrians and cycling ===
- Big Indian Creek Trail (Proposed)
- Walker's Pond Trail
- Wellston Trail
- The Walk at Sandy Run Creek

== See also ==
- National Register of Historic Places listings in Houston County, Georgia
- Houston County Schools
- List of counties in Georgia
