= Centerville, Georgia =

Centerville
- City
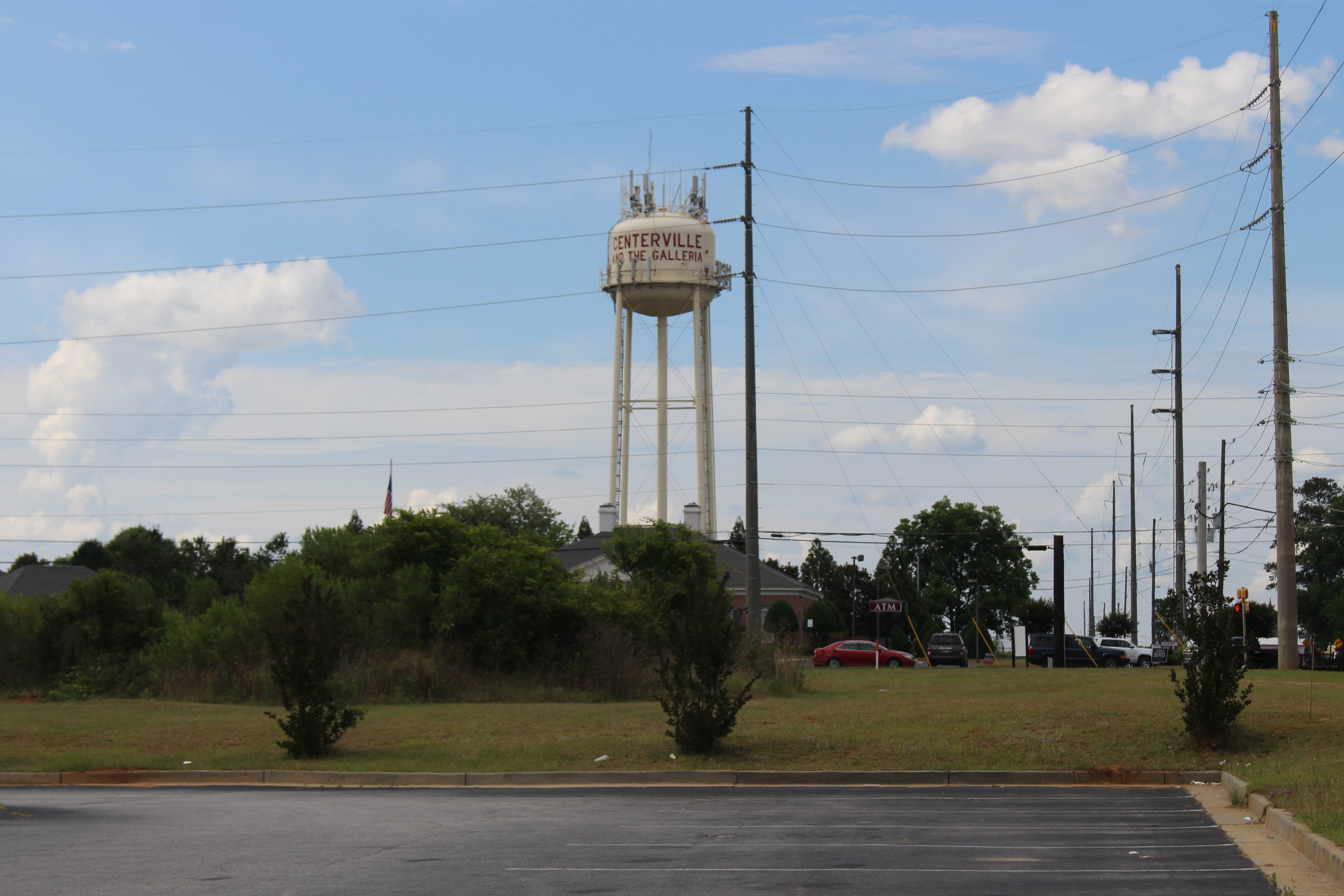

- Flag Seal Logo

- Location in Houston County and the state of Georgia
- Coordinates: 32°36′31″N 83°38′17″W
- Country: United States
- State: Georgia
- County: Houston
- Founded: March 25, 1958

Government
  - Mayor: J. Michael Evans
  - City Council: Bob Bird; Edward D. Armijo

Area
  - Total: 3.97 sq mi (10.28 km^{2})
  - Land: 3.95 sq mi (10.22 km^{2})
  - Water: 0.023 sq mi (0.06 km^{2}) 0.58%
- Elevation: 449 ft (137 m)

Population (2020)
  - Total: 8,228
  - Density: 2,085.9/sq mi (805.37/km^{2})
- Time zone: UTC-5 (Eastern)
  - Summer (DST): UTC-4 (Eastern)
- ZIP code: 31028
- Area code: 478
- FIPS code: 13-14920
- GNIS feature ID: 0355090
- Website: www.centervillega.org

Centerville is a city in Houston County, Georgia, United States. The city is a part of the larger Macon-Warner Robins Combined Statistical Area. It was incorporated March 25, 1958. As of the 2020 census, Centerville had a population of 8,228. The city's central location, proximity to major highways and interstates, and excellent quality of life makes it one of the top bedroom communities in Georgia. In 2016, Centerville was ranked 7th Happiest City in Georgia by zippia.com, a website devoted to career-related rankings.

== Etymology ==
Contrary to popular belief, Centerville owes its name not to its geographical position within the state of Georgia, but its position between County seat of Bibb County (Macon) and the county Seat of Houston County (Perry).

== Geography ==
Centerville is located in northern Houston County at 32°37′56″N 83°40′41″W (32.632111, -83.677950). It is bordered to the east and south by the city of Warner Robins and to the west by the city of Byron in Peach County. U.S. Route 41 passes through the west side of Centerville, leading north 17 miles (27 km) to Macon and south 12 miles (19 km) to Perry, the Houston County seat. State Route 247 Connector (Watson Boulevard) forms the southern edge of Centerville, leading east into Warner Robins and west 3 miles (5 km) to Interstate 75 at Exit 146.

According to the United States Census Bureau, Centerville has a total area of 4.0 square miles (10.3 km^{2}), of which 0.023 square miles (0.06 km^{2}), or 0.58%, are water.

== Demographics ==
Historical population
Census	Pop.	Note	%±
1960	290		—
1970	1,725		494.8%
1980	2,622		52.0%
1990	3,251		24.0%
2000	4,278		31.6%
2010	7,148		67.1%
2020	8,228		15.1%
2025 (est.)	9,505	▲	15.5%
U.S. Decennial Census; 2025

=== 2020 census ===
As of the 2020 census, Centerville had a population of 8,228. The median age was 38.4 years. 22.8% of residents were under the age of 18 and 16.4% of residents were 65 years of age or older. For every 100 females there were 94.9 males, and for every 100 females age 18 and over there were 91.7 males age 18 and over.

100.0% of residents lived in urban areas, while 0.0% lived in rural areas.

There were 3,318 households in Centerville, including 2,122 families. Of all households, 32.2% had children under the age of 18 living in them, 45.9% were married-couple households, 19.2% were households with a male householder and no spouse or partner present, and 28.8% were households with a female householder and no spouse or partner present. About 26.1% of all households were made up of individuals and 9.4% had someone living alone who was 65 years of age or older.

There were 3,530 housing units, of which 6.0% were vacant. The homeowner vacancy rate was 2.3% and the rental vacancy rate was 6.9%.

Centerville racial composition as of 2020
Race	Num.	Perc.
White (non-Hispanic)	4,498	54.67%
Black or African American (non-Hispanic)	2,291	27.84%
Native American	35	0.43%
Asian	424	5.15%
Pacific Islander	1	0.01%
Other/Mixed	450	5.47%
Hispanic or Latino	529	6.43%

== Government ==
The City of Centerville has a weak Mayor-Council form of government, meaning the Mayor's vote counts equal to that of each council person's vote. The services that the city government provides include curbside trash pick-up, sewer, and water. Centerville also has a Recycling Center within city limits accepting paper, metals, glass, and other miscellaneous items. The city has a senior tax exemption law that allows citizens 70 and over to apply for a total tax exemption for their personal home and up to one acre of land, provided their home is located on the land.

== Transportation ==
=== Major Roadways ===
The major roadways in and around Centerville include I-75, GA Highway 247 Connector (Watson Blvd), and GA Highway 41.

=== Pedestrians ===
In 2012, Centerville adopted the sidewalk improvement plan. This plan continues to improve pedestrian walkways in Centerville. In January 2017, the Houston County Commission approved contracts to design two road widening projects. The largest of these two projects was in Centerville, 2 miles of Elberta Road. This project included the addition of a turn lane and sidewalk to this 2-mile stretch. This project was funded by a local 2018 SPLOST.

=== Airports ===
Centerville is 93 miles from Atlanta's Hartsfield-Jackson International Airport. Centerville is 25 miles from the Perry-Houston County Airport. Centerville is 8 miles from the Middle Georgia Regional Airport, which is located in south Macon-Bibb county.
