= Carlson, Texas =

- Unincorporated community
- Location within Texas Location within the United States
- Coordinates: 30°25′40″N 97°27′7″W
- Country: United States
- State: Texas
- County: Travis
- Elevation: 571 ft (174 m)
- Time zone: UTC-6 (Central (CST))
  - Summer (DST): UTC-5 (CDT)
- Area codes: 512 & 737
- GNIS feature ID: 1353827

Carlson is an unincorporated community in Travis County, in the U.S. state of Texas. According to the Handbook of Texas, the community had a population of 61 in 2000. It is located within the Greater Austin metropolitan area.

== History ==
Carlson was possibly named after local residents. The population was 61 in 1972 and 2000.

On April 30, 1954, an F3 tornado struck Carlson.

== Geography ==
Carlson is located near Farm to Market Road 973, 9 mi (14 km) east of Pflugerville in northeastern Travis County.

== Education ==
Today the community is served by the Elgin Independent School District. Schools that serve the community are Neidig Elementary School, Elgin Middle School, and Elgin High School.

== Sources ==
- Grazulis, Thomas P. (July 1993). Significant Tornadoes 1680–1991: A Chronology and Analysis of Events. St. Johnsbury, Vermont: The Tornado Project of Environmental Films. ISBN 1-879362-03-1.
- National Weather Service (April–June 1954). Storm Data Publication (Report). National Centers for Environmental Information – via Storm Events Database.
- U.S. Weather Bureau (April 1954). "Storm data and unusual weather phenomena". Climatological Data National Summary. 5 (4). Asheville, North Carolina: National Climatic Data Center: 106–115.
