= Beulah, Angelina County, Texas =

- Ghost town
- Location within Texas Location within the United States
- Coordinates: 31°11′08″N 94°40′07″W
- Country: United States
- State: Texas
- County: Angelina
- Elevation: 230 ft (70 m)
- Time zone: UTC-6 (Central (CST))
  - Summer (DST): UTC-5 (CDT)
- Area code: 936
- GNIS feature ID: 1379414

Beulah is a ghost town in Angelina County, in the U.S. state of Texas. It is located within the Lufkin, Texas micropolitan area.

== History ==
Beulah had a church, a store, and several houses in the 1930s. Many of the community's residents worked in a nearby oilfield named Ginter. The population declined sometime after World War II, and only two churches and a few scattered houses remained in the area in the early 1990s.

== Geography ==
Beulah was located on Farm to Market Road 58, 11 mi (18 km) southeast of Lufkin in southern Angelina County.

== Education ==
Beulah is located within the Diboll Independent School District.

== See also ==
- List of ghost towns in Texas
