= Powersville, Georgia =

Unincorporated community in Georgia, U.S.

Coordinates: 32°36′15″N 83°47′34″W

Powersville is an unincorporated community in Peach County, in the U.S. state of Georgia.

== History ==
Powersville had its start when the Macon and Southwestern Railroad was extended to that point. The community was named after a railroad official. A variant name is "Powerville". A post office called Powersville was established in 1853, and remained in operation until 1985.
