= List of county courthouses in Georgia =

The U.S. state of Georgia is divided into 159 counties, more than any other state except for Texas, which has 254 counties. In Georgia, county seats typically have a courthouse at a town square. Courthouses in Georgia have been replaced for a variety of reasons. Courthouses have typically been replaced over time due to natural wear on courthouses, being destroyed in the Civil War, or communities outgrowing their current courthouse. When county seats have been moved, a new courthouse was typically constructed. Courthouses in Georgia have also been destroyed by disasters including fire, tornadoes, war, and arson. The most recent county courthouses to suffer disasters were Hancock County, Georgia's courthouse in August 2014, Wayne County, Georgia's courthouse in September 2025, and the historic Floyd County, Georgia courthouse in March 2026.

== History ==
The architectural style of courthouses in Georgia has varied over time and from region to region.

=== Antebellum ===
It was common for the first courthouse of a county on the frontier to be a log cabin type structure. Houses being repurposed for county courthouses was not an uncommon method for a county acquiring a courthouse. Courthouses often doubled as churches and schools before the 1900s. During Georgia's colonial period the area was subdivided into parishes. Some parishes did have the equivalent of county courthouses. No county courthouses in Georgia from the 1700s currently survive.

By the mid-1800s it became common for courthouses to still be made of wood, but out of wood that had been processed into boards instead of unhewed logs. The Old Marion County Courthouse in Tazewell, Georgia and the Old Chattahoochee County Courthouse are only two surviving wooden courthouses in Georgia. Neither are currently in use as a courthouse. County seats of areas with larger populations often built courthouses made out of bricks before counties from more rural areas. Vernacular architecture was a common style. Greek Revival was another common pre-Civil War architectural style for county courthouses.

=== American Civil War ===
During the American Civil War, twelve county courthouses were destroyed by Union troops. In June 1863, the courthouse of McIntosh County at Darien was destroyed by Union Troops along with most of the town. Dade County was destroyed in 1863 during the Chattanooga campaign. Catoosa County's courthouse at Ringgold was saved from destruction by William Tecumseh Sherman when he learned it was also a Masonic lodge.

The courthouses of Cherokee County, Clayton County, Cobb County, Polk County, and Whitfield County were destroyed in 1864 during the Atlanta campaign. The courthouses of Bulloch, Butts, Screven County, Washington County, and Wilkinson County were destroyed during Sherman's March to the Sea in 1864.

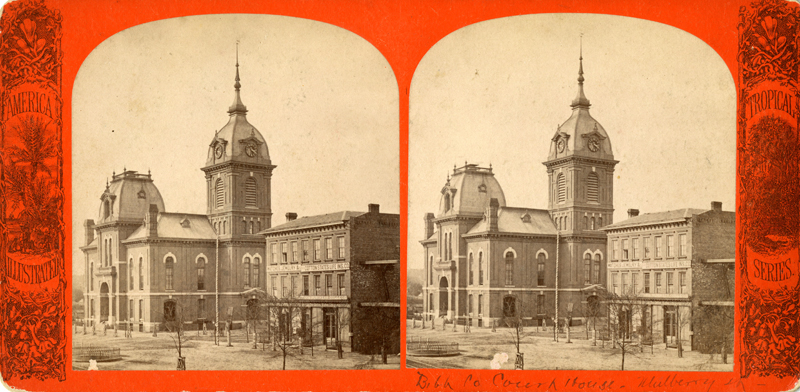
Bibb County Courthouse, Macon, Georgia circa 1876

=== Reconstruction to the 1920s ===
By the late 1800s, brick courthouses were more common than they had been earlier in the century. Many courthouses were being constructed in styles more elaborate than the typical vernacular architecture, which had previously been common. Neoclassical, Italianate, and Romanesque were the most common architectural styles of county courthouses during the late 1800s. High Victorian Gothic and Second Empire were also common.

=== Works Progress Administration ===
During the 1930s, the Works Progress Administration assisted many county governments with building new courthouses and renovating older courthouses. Stripped Classicism and Colonial Revival were two of the more common styles during the 1930s.

=== Post-World War II courthouses ===
After World War II, Neoclassical architecture had been surpassed by Modern architecture as the top style for new courthouses. When modern architecture was not used as the style of a new courthouse, it was often due to an attempt to replicate the appearance of a previous. By the 1980s, many counties began to replace their historic courthouses with judicial complexes. Most offices would be transferred to the new building, but some would remain in the old courthouses.

=== Surviving original county courthouses ===
It is uncommon for counties to still have their original courthouse. The surviving county courthouses that were their county's first courthouse are:

- Old Banks County Courthouse completed in 1863, no longer in use.
- Brooks County Courthouse, completed in 1864.
- McDuffie County Courthouse, completed in 1872.
- Jeff Davis County Courthouse, completed in 1906.
- Turner County Courthouse, completed in 1908.
- Ben Hill County Courthouse, completed in 1909.
- Tift County Courthouse, completed in 1913.
- Bleckley County Courthouse, completed in 1914.
- Bacon County Courthouse, completed in 1919.
- Atkinson County Courthouse, completed in 1920.
- Treutlen County Courthouse, completed in 1920.
- Barrow County Courthouse, completed in 1920.
- Candler County Courthouse, completed in 1921.
- Evans County Courthouse, completed in 1923.
- Long County Courthouse, completed in 1924.
- Lamar County Courthouse, completed in 1931.
- Peach County Courthouse, completed in 1936.

A county still having their previous county courthouse in existence is not uncommon. Many previous county courthouses have been repurposed as museums. It is rare for a county to have more than one previous county courthouse still in existence, or to have a courthouse still in existence other than the one immediately preceding their current one. The Old Bartow County Courthouse, 1869 Clayton County Courthouse, Floyd County Courthouse, and the Old Spalding County Courthouse are examples of such courthouses. The only surviving courthouse from a town that is not the current county seat is the Old Marion County Courthouse in Tazewell, Georgia.

=== Oldest courthouses ===
The ten oldest of Georgia's county courthouses still in existence are:

- Old Government House Richmond County, Georgia, completed in 1801.
- Columbia County Courthouse, completed 1812 with extensive additions made in 1856.
- Putnam County Courthouse, completed in 1824.
- Fayette County Courthouse, completed in 1825.
- Crawford County Courthouse, completed in 1832.
- Lumpkin County Courthouse, completed in 1836.
- Old Marion County Courthouse, in 1848.
- Greene County Courthouse, completed in 1849.
- Old Chattahoochee County Courthouse, completed in the early 1850s.
- Burke County Courthouse completed in 1857.

The ten oldest of Georgia's county courthouses currently in use as courthouses are:

- Putnam County Courthouse completed in 1824.
- Greene County Courthouse completed in 1849.
- Burke County Courthouse completed in 1857.
- Thomas County Courthouse, completed in 1858.
- Brooks County Courthouse, completed in 1864.
- Washington County Courthouse, completed in 1869.
- McDuffie County Courthouse, completed in 1872.
- McIntosh County Courthouse, completed in 1873.
- Newton County Courthouse, completed in 1884.
- Dooly County Courthouse, completed in 1892.

== County courthouse listing ==
List of county courthouses in Georgia
County	Date complete	Location	Article	Image	Style	Notes	Coordinates
Appling; Created 1818	1820s	Holmesville			Wooden structure	Destroyed by fire in the 1850s	
Appling; Created 1818	1856	Holmesville			Two-story Wooden structure	Sold in 1873 to finance the new courthouse in Baxley	
Appling; Created 1818	1873	Baxley				Destroyed by fire on 7 September 1876.	
Appling; Created 1818	1870s	Baxley			Wooden structure	Replaced in 1908	
Appling; Created 1818	1908	Baxley	Appling County Courthouse		Neoclassical	NRHP-listed (refnum 80000965).	31.778056°N 82.349167°W
Atkinson; Created 1917	1920	Peason	Atkinson County Courthouse		Neoclassical	Remodeled in the early 1980s. NRHP-listed (refnum 80000966).	31.297222°N 82.853056°W
Bacon; Created 1914	1919	Alma	Bacon County Courthouse		Neoclassical	NRHP-listed (refnum 80000967).	31.541111°N 82.462778°W
Baker; Created 1825	late 1820s	Byron				County seat moved to Newton in 1837	
Baker; Created 1825	1837	Newton					
Baker; Created 1825	1874	Newton					
Baker; Created 1825	1900	Newton	Baker County Courthouse		Romanesque Revival	Renovated following the flooding of the Flint River in 1925, 1929, and 1994. A temporary courthouse was used for six years following the 1994 flood. Currently used as a public library, and as the Baker County Historical Society. NRHP-listed (refnum 80004443). The courthouse was damaged during Hurricane Michael in October 2018.	31.314312°N 84.335317°W
Baker; Created 1825	19??	Newton				Formerly a schoolhouse. Became the county courthouse in 2000.	31.317730°N 84.342342°W
Baldwin; Created 1803	1806	Hillsborough				County seat moved to Milledgeville in 1807. County courts held in the state capitol until 1808.	
Baldwin; Created 1803	1814	Milledgeville					
Baldwin; Created 1803	1847	Milledgeville				Destroyed by fire on 24 February 1861. County court held in various locations afterwards.	
Baldwin; Created 1803	1887	Milledgeville	Baldwin County Courthouse			Remodeled in 1937 and 1965. Still in existence.	33.081327°N 83.229442°W
Baldwin; Created 1803	1997	Milledgeville					33.081415°N 83.228717°W
Banks; Created 1859	1863	Homer	Old Banks County Courthouse		Greek Revival	Construction started in 1860, and delayed by the American Civil War. Some sources say it was completed in 1875. NRHP-listed (refnum 80000969).	34.334688°N 83.498904°W
Banks; Created 1859	1987	Homer	Banks County Courthouse		Modern		34.335381°N 83.499374°W
Barrow; Created 1914	1920	Winder	Barrow County Courthouse		Neoclassical	NRHP-listed (refnum 80000970).	33.992361°N 83.721596°W
Bartow; Created 1832	1830s	Cassville				Destroyed by William Tecumseh Sherman's troops in 1864 during the American Civil War.	
Bartow; Created 1832	1869	Cartersville	Old Bartow County Courthouse		Italianate	The Bartow History Museum since 2010. NRHP-listed (refnum 80000972).	34.166944°N 84.796111°W
Bartow; Created 1832	1902	Cartersville	Bartow County Courthouse		Neoclassical	Still occasionally used for court. NRHP-listed (refnum 80000971).	34.165947°N 84.797734°W
Bartow; Created 1832	1992	Cartersville	Frank Moore Administration and Judicial Center		Modern		34.165694°N 84.799973°W
Ben Hill; Created 1906	1909	Fitzgerald	Ben Hill County Courthouse		Neoclassical	Renovated in the 1950s. NRHP-listed (refnum 80000973).	31.714479°N 83.249850°W
Berrien; Created 1856	1858	Nashville			Two-story wooden structure	Moved across the street from the square and used as a hotel in 1898.	31.206741°N 83.249778°W
Berrien; Created 1856	1898	Nashville	Berrien County Courthouse			NRHP-listed (refnum 77000409).	31.206741°N 83.249778°W
Berrien; Created 1856	2008	Nashville	Berrien County Administration Building		Modern		31.208515°N 83.249754°W
Bibb; Created 1822	1825	Macon			One-room building		
Bibb; Created 1822	1828	Macon			Brick structure		
Bibb; Created 1822	1870	Macon			Three-story structure with a clock tower		32.838557°N 83.627862°W
Bibb; Created 1822	1924	Macon	Bibb County Courthouse		Neoclassical	Remodelled in 1940 as part of WPA	32.838557°N 83.627862°W
Bleckley; Created 1912	1914	Cochran	Bleckley County Courthouse		Neoclassical	NRHP-listed (refnum 80000975).	32.387570°N 83.355384°W
Brantley; Created 1920	1921	Hoboken				Fate unknown	
Brantley; Created 1920	1930	Nahunta	Brantley County Courthouse		Colonial Revival	NRHP-listed (refnum 95000712).	31.203040°N 81.981578°W
Brooks; Created 1858	1864	Quitman	Brooks County Courthouse		Romanesque Revival/Renaissance Revival	Construction began in 1859, but was halted due to the America Civil War; Remodeled in 1892. NRHP-listed (refnum 80000976).	30.785386°N 83.560075°W
Bryan; Created 1793	1790s	Hardwick				Fate unknown	
Bryan; Created 1793	late 1790s	Bryan Courthouse				Also known as Lamb's Tavern	
Bryan; Created 1793	1810s	Clyde				Fate unknown	
Bryan; Created 1793	1938	Pembroke	Bryan County Courthouse		Neoclassical	NRHP-listed (refnum 95000713).	32.133476°N 81.621502°W
Bulloch; Created 1796	1803	Statesboro			Wooden structure		
Bulloch; Created 1796	1807	Statesboro			Wooden structure	Destroyed by William Tecumseh Sherman's troops in 1864 during the American Civil War.	
Bulloch; Created 1796	1866	Statesboro			Two-story wooden structure		
Bulloch; Created 1796	1894	Statesboro	Bulloch County Courthouse		Queen Anne	NRHP-listed (refnum 80000978).	32.449333°N 81.783030°W
Burke; Created 1777	1777	Waynesboro			Wooden structure	Destroyed by fire in 1825.	
Burke; Created 1777	1856	Waynesboro			Two-story brick structure.	Destroyed by fire on 24 January 1856.	
Burke; Created 1777	1857	Waynesboro	Burke County Courthouse		Italianate	Expanded 1899, and 1940. Renovated several times. NRHP-listed (refnum 80000980).	33.090485°N 82.015625°W
Butts; Created 1825	1826	Jackson			Log cabin	Replaced 1827.	
Butts; Created 1825	N/A	Jackson				Destroyed by fire on 7 February 1828 before completion.	
Butts; Created 1825	1828	Jackson					
Butts; Created 1825	1860	Jackson				Destroyed by William Tecumseh Sherman's troops in 1864 during the American Civil War.	
Butts; Created 1825	1870s	Jackson					33.294774°N 83.966967°W
Butts; Created 1825	1898	Jackson	Butts County Courthouse		High Victorian Gothic	NRHP-listed (refnum 80000982).	33.294774°N 83.966967°W
Calhoun; Created 1854	1854	Morgan				Destroyed by fire in 1888.	
Calhoun; Created 1854	1888	Morgan				Damaged by fire on 12 December 1891. Destroyed by fire on 2 August 1920.	
Calhoun; Created 1854	1935	Morgan	Calhoun County Courthouse		Colonial Revival	Renovated 1972.	31.537660°N 84.599654°W
Camden; Created 1777	1780s	St. Patrick				Fate unknown.	
Camden; Created 1777	1800s	Jefferson				Fate unknown.	
Camden; Created 1777	1870s	St. Marys				Fate unknown.	
Camden; Created 1777	1928	Woodbine	Camden County Courthouse		Gothic Revival architecture	Still in existence. NRHP-listed (refnum 80000983).	30.968185°N 81.720836°W
Camden; Created 1777	2004	Woodbine			Modern		30.968259°N 81.720355°W
Campbell; Created 1828; Merged with Fulton in 1932	1829	Campbellton			Wood structure	Fate unknown.	
Campbell; Created 1828; Merged with Fulton in 1932	1835	Campbellton			Two-story brick structure.	Demolished in the early 1900s.	
Campbell; Created 1828; Merged with Fulton in 1932	1871	Fairburn	Campbell County Courthouse		Greek Revival/Italianate	County merged with Fulton County in 1932. Currently used as a community center. NRHP-listed (refnum 76000634).	33.566667°N 84.579444°W
Candler; Created 1914	1921	Metter	Candler County Courthouse		Neoclassical	NRHP-listed (refnum 80000984).	32.396750°N 82.062424°W
Carroll; Created 1826	1820s	Carrollton					
Carroll; Created 1826	1849	Carrollton					33.580093°N 85.075098°W
Carroll; Created 1826	1892	Carrollton				Destroyed by fire in 1927.	33.579560°N 85.072604°W
Carroll; Created 1826	1928	Carrollton	Carroll County Courthouse		Renaissance Revival	NRHP-listed (refnum 80000985).	33.579560°N 85.072604°W
Catoosa; Created 1853	1856	Ringgold				Third story added as masonic lodge in late-1850s Saved from burning by William Tecumseh Sherman's troops in 1864 because of the masonic lodge.	
Catoosa; Created 1853	1939	Ringgold	Catoosa County Courthouse		Colonial Revival	NRHP-listed (refnum 06000844).	34.915843°N 85.110803°W
Charlton; Created 1854	1856	Trader's Hill			Two-story wooden structure	Destroyed by fire in 1877.	
Charlton; Created 1854	1870s	Trader's Hill					
Charlton; Created 1854	1902	Folkston				Destroyed by fire in 1928.	
Charlton; Created 1854	1928	Folkston	Charlton County Courthouse		Colonial Revival/Neoclassical	NRHP-listed (refnum 80000987).	30.83189°N 82.00486°W
Chatham; Created 1777	1730s	Savannah				Various structures served as a courthouse during the Trustee Period.	
Chatham; Created 1777	1750s	Savannah					
Chatham; Created 1777	1773	Savannah				Construction started 1765. 34 x 60-foot red brick building facing Wright Square; Used as a British barracks during the American Revolution. Interior destroyed by fire in 1796.	
Chatham; Created 1777	1804	Savannah			Brick structure.	Demolished October 1830.	
Chatham; Created 1777	1832	Savannah			Greek Revival	Demolished 1889.	32.077642°N 81.091872°W
Chatham; Created 1777	1889	Savannah	Chatham County Courthouse		Romanesque Revival	Still in existence. Used as an administration building.	32.077642°N 81.091872°W
Chatham; Created 1777	1978	Savannah			Modern		32.079185°N 81.097091°W
Chattahoochee; Created 1854	1850s	Cusseta	Old Chattahoochee County Courthouse		Two-story wooden structure.	Moved to Westville (Georgia) in 1974. Still in existence.	32.3839°N 84.9585°W
Chattahoochee; Created 1854	1975	Cusseta	Chattahoochee County Courthouse		Modern		32.306329°N 84.776628°W
Chattooga; Created 1838	1840	Summerville			Two-story structure.		
Chattooga; Created 1838	1909	Summerville	Chattooga County Courthouse		Neoclassical	NRHP-listed (refnum 80000988).	34.480458°N 85.348470°W
Cherokee; Created 1831	1833	Canton			Log Cabin		
Cherokee; Created 1831	1840s	Canton				Destroyed by General William Tecumseh Sherman's troops in 1864 during the American Civil War.	
Cherokee; Created 1831	1874	Canton				Destroyed by fire in 1928 while the new courthouse was being built.	34.237077°N 84.490839°W
Cherokee; Created 1831	1929	Canton	Cherokee County Courthouse		Neoclassical	Construction began in 1927. Some offices still in use. NRHP-listed (refnum 81000198).	34.237587°N 84.490943°W
Cherokee; Created 1831	1994	Canton	Cherokee County Justice Center				34.237581°N 84.490129°W
Clarke; Created 1801	1802	Watkinsville					
Clarke; Created 1801	1806	Watkinsville					
Clarke; Created 1801	1829	Watkinsville					
Clarke; Created 1801	1849	Watkinsville					
Clarke; Created 1801	18??	Athens				The county seat of Clarke County changed from Watkinsville to Athens in 1871. In 1871, the former city hall of Athens was used as the courthouse.	
Clarke; Created 1801	1876	Athens			Two-story red brick courthouse		33.959919°N 83.383855°W
Clarke; Created 1801	1914	Athens	Clarke County Courthouse		Beaux-Arts		33.959998°N 83.374490°W
Clay; Created 1854	1873	Fort Gaines	Clay County Courthouse			It is unknown what the county previously used as a courthouse. NRHP-listed (refnum 80000992).	31.604198°N 85.048419°W
Clayton; Created 1858	1859	Jonesboro			Wooden structure.	Destroyed by William Tecumseh Sherman's troops in 1864 during the American Civil War.	
Clayton; Created 1858	1869	Jonesboro			Italianate	Became a masonic lodge in 1898. Still in existence.	33.522833°N 84.353868°W
Clayton; Created 1858	1898	Jonesboro	Clayton County Courthouse		Romanesque Revival	Surrounded in 1962 by an addition By February 2001, the 1962 addition was removed.	33.520863°N 84.353320°W
Clayton; Created 1858	2000	Jonesboro	Harold R. Banke Justice Center				33.506615°N 84.356970°W
Clinch; Created 1850	1852	Magnolia				Destroyed by fire in 1856.	
Clinch; Created 1850	1859	Magnolia				Moved to Homerville during the winter of 1859–1860. Destroyed by fire in 1867.	
Clinch; Created 1850	18??	Homerville					
Clinch; Created 1850	1896	Homerville	Clinch County Courthouse		Folk Victorian	Renovated by the WPA in 1936. NRHP-listed (refnum 80000993).	31.036924°N 82.748453°W
Cobb; Created 1832	1834	Marietta			Log cabin		
Cobb; Created 1832	1838	Marietta				Demolished in the summer of 1852.	
Cobb; Created 1832	1850s	Marietta				Destroyed by William Tecumseh Sherman's troops in 1864 during the American Civil War.	
Cobb; Created 1832	1873	Marietta				Two-story brick structure.	33.952434°N 84.548756°W
Cobb; Created 1832	1899	Marietta				Damaged by a fire on 3 May 1952.	33.952434°N 84.548756°W
Cobb; Created 1832	1966	Marietta	Cobb County Courthouse		Modern.		33.952880°N 84.546702°W
Coffee; Created 1854	1850s	Douglas			Log cabin		
Coffee; Created 1854	1889	Douglas			Log cabin	Destroyed by fire on 7 October 1898.	
Coffee; Created 1854	1900	Douglas			Two-story brick structure.	Destroyed by fire on 25 November 1938.	31.508535°N 82.850670°W
Coffee; Created 1854	1940	Douglas	Coffee County Courthouse		Stripped Classicism		31.508664°N 82.850987°W
Colquitt; Created 1854	1859	Moultrie			Log cabin	Destroyed by fire on 25 February 1881.	
Colquitt; Created 1854	1880s	Moultrie			Two-story wooden structure.		31.179408°N 83.788243°W
Colquitt; Created 1854	1902	Moultrie	Colquitt County Courthouse		Neoclassical	Partially burned on 21 January 1922. Restored by the WPA in 1940. Remodelled and modernized in 1956–1957. Renovated from 1998–2001 to pre-1950s exterior. NRHP-listed (refnum 80001003).	31.179408°N 83.788243°W
Columbia; Created 1790	1790	Cobbham					
Columbia; Created 1790	1792	Kiokee					
Columbia; Created 1790	1793	Appling					
Columbia; Created 1790	1812	Appling	Columbia County Courthouse		Greek Revival/Italianate	Extensive additions made in 1856. Restored in 1980. NRHP-listed (refnum 80001005).	33.546569°N 82.316447°W
Columbia; Created 1790	2001	Evans	Columbia County Courthouse Annex				33.545389°N 82.132998°W
Cook; Created 1918	19??	Adel				The second floor of Adel city hall was used as a courthouse upon the creation of the county.	
Cook; Created 1918	1939	Adel	Cook County Courthouse		Stripped Classicism	NRHP-listed (refnum 95000714).	31.139231°N 83.423810°W
Coweta; Created 1826	1828	Newnan			Log cabin		
Coweta; Created 1826	1829	Newnan			Two-story brick structure.		33.374774°N 84.799983°W
Coweta; Created 1826	1904	Newnan	Coweta County Courthouse		Neoclassical	Renovated in 1975, and again in 1989–1990. NRHP-listed (refnum 80001006).	33.374774°N 84.799983°W
Crawford; Created 1822	1820s	Knoxville				Destroyed by fire in 1829 or 1830.	
Crawford; Created 1822	1832	Knoxville	Crawford County Courthouse			Renovated many times since it was constructed. Still in existence. NRHP-listed (refnum 80001008).	32.724414°N 83.997944°W
Crawford; Created 1822	2002	Knoxville					32.723170°N 83.996656°W
Crisp; Created 1905	1907	Cordele				Destroyed by fire in 1950.	31.967207°N 83.783022°W
Crisp; Created 1905	1950	Cordele	Crisp County Courthouse		Modern		31.973436°N 83.782095°W
Dade; Created 1837	18??	Trenton				Destroyed by fire on 15 April 1853.	
Dade; Created 1837	1850s	Trenton				Destroyed by fire November 1863 by Union troops as part of Chattanooga campaign during the American Civil War.	
Dade; Created 1837	1869	Trenton				Fire in 1895. Demolished in 1925.	
Dade; Created 1837	1926	Trenton	Dade County Courthouse		Dutch Colonial Revival	NRHP-listed (refnum 80001009).	34.872194°N 85.509341°W
Dade; Created 1837	2001	Trenton	Dade County Administrative Building				34.871420°N 85.511942°W
Dawson; Created 1857	1858	Dawsonville	Dawson County Courthouse			Still in existence. NRHP-listed (refnum 80001010).	34.421291°N 84.118906°W
Dawson; Created 1857	1978	Dawsonville			Modern	Demolished and replaced in 2011.	34.422988°N 84.119299°W
Dawson; Created 1857	2011	Dawsonville					34.422941°N 84.119408°W
Decatur; Created 1823	1824	Bainbridge			Wooden structure.		
Decatur; Created 1823	1832	Bainbridge			Brick structure.		
Decatur; Created 1823	1855	Bainbridge			Two-story brick structure.		30.906164°N 84.576054°W
Decatur; Created 1823	1902	Bainbridge	Decatur County Courthouse		Neoclassical	NRHP-listed (refnum 80001011).	30.906843°N 84.576693°W
DeKalb; Created 1822	1823	Decatur			Wooden structure.		
DeKalb; Created 1822	18??	Decatur			Wooden structure.	Destroyed by fire in 1842.	
DeKalb; Created 1822	18??	Decatur			Wooden structure.	Destroyed by fire in 1898.	
DeKalb; Created 1822	18??	Decatur				Destroyed by fire on 13 September 1916.	
DeKalb; Created 1822	1916	Decatur	Old DeKalb County Courthouse		Brick structure.	NRHP-listed (refnum 71001016).	33.775102°N 84.296504°W
DeKalb; Created 1822	1967	Decatur			Modern		33.774015°N 84.297323°W
Dodge; Created 1870	1870	Eastman			Two-story wooden structure.		32.200989°N 83.175983°W
Dodge; Created 1870	1908	Eastman	Dodge County Courthouse		Neoclassical	NRHP-listed (refnum 80001012).	32.200989°N 83.175983°W
Dooly; Created 1821	1820s	Berrien					
Dooly; Created 1821	1830s	Drayton			Wooden structure.		
Dooly; Created 1821	1842	Vienna			Wooden structure.	Destroyed by fire on 7 May 1847.	
Dooly; Created 1821	1849	Vienna			Wooden structure.		
Dooly; Created 1821	1892	Vienna	Dooly County Courthouse		Romanesque Revival	Renovated in 1963, and in the 1980s. NRHP-listed (refnum 80001013).	32.091076°N 83.797398°W
Dougherty; Created 1853	1856	Albany			Two-story brick structure		31.579271°N 84.152410°W
Dougherty; Created 1853	1904	Albany				Destroyed by fire in 1966.	31.579271°N 84.152410°W
Dougherty; Created 1853	1968	Albany	Albany-Dougherty County Judicial Building		Modern	Shared government building with the city of Albany until 1993.	31.579271°N 84.152410°W
Douglas; Created 1870	1872	Douglasville					
Douglas; Created 1870	1880	Douglasville			Two-story brick structure.	Abandoned in 1884 due to poor quality bricks. What was used for the next few years is unknown.	33.750055°N 84.750493°W
Douglas; Created 1870	1896	Douglasville			Two-story brick structure.	Destroyed by fire on 11 January 1956.	33.750055°N 84.750493°W
Douglas; Created 1870	1957	Douglasville	Douglas County Courthouse		Modern	Currently home to the Douglas County Historical Society. NRHP-listed (refnum 02001216).	33.750055°N 84.750493°W
Douglas; Created 1870	1998	Douglasville			Modern		33.743449°N 84.730775°W
Early; Created 1818	1826	Blakely			Wooden structure.		
Early; Created 1818	1858	Blakely				Destroyed by fire in 1896.	
Early; Created 1818	1906	Blakely	Early County Courthouse		Neoclassical	NRHP-listed (refnum 80001015).	31.377631°N 84.934007°W
Echols; Created 1858	1859	Statenville			Two-story wooden structure.	Destroyed by fire on 31 December 1897 thought to be set by an arsonist.	30.703137°N 83.027762°W
Echols; Created 1858	1899	Statenville			Two-story wooden structure.	Demolished August 1955	30.703137°N 83.027762°W
Echols; Created 1858	1955	Statenville	Echols County Courthouse		Modern		30.703137°N 83.027762°W
Effingham; Created 1777	1780s	Tuckasee King					
Effingham; Created 1777	1780s	Elberton					
Effingham; Created 1777	1798	Ebenezer					
Effingham; Created 1777	1800s	Springfield					
Effingham; Created 1777	1810s	Springfield				Authorized by the Georgia General Assembly in 1816. Possibly never built.	
Effingham; Created 1777	1849	Springfield					
Effingham; Created 1777	1908	Springfield	Old Effingham County Courthouse		Neoclassical	NRHP-listed (refnum 80001016).	32.374101°N 81.314956°W
Effingham; Created 1777	2007	Springfield	Effingham County Judicial Complex		Modern		32.373018°N 81.315152°W
Elbert; Created 1790	1792	Elberton					
Elbert; Created 1790	1816	Elberton					
Elbert; Created 1790	1894	Elberton	Elbert County Courthouse		Romanesque Revival	NRHP-listed (refnum 80001017).	34.109917°N 82.868590°W
Emanuel; Created 1812	1814	Swainsboro				Destroyed by fire on 10 April 1841.	
Emanuel; Created 1812	1854	Swainsboro				Destroyed by fire in 1855.	
Emanuel; Created 1812	1856	Swainsboro				Destroyed by fire in 1857.	
Emanuel; Created 1812	1850s	Swainsboro			Two-story wooden structure	Moved in 1895 to the southeast corner of Moring and South Green Streets. Demolished in 1960.	
Emanuel; Created 1812	1895	Swainsboro			Two-story brick structure.	Destroyed by fire in May 1919.	32.596756°N 82.334394°W
Emanuel; Created 1812	1920	Swainsboro			Three-story brick structure.	Destroyed by fire on 10 November 1938.	32.596756°N 82.334394°W
Emanuel; Created 1812	1940	Swainsboro	Emanuel County Courthouse		Stripped Classicism	Demolished in 2000. NRHP-listed (refnum 95000715).	32.596756°N 82.334394°W
Emanuel; Created 1812	2002	Swainsboro			Modern	Incorporates a 1936 United States Post Office.	32.596469°N 82.333230°W
Evans; Created 1914	1923	Claxton	Evans County Courthouse		Neoclassical	NRHP-listed (refnum 80001018).	32.161773°N 81.907528°W
Fannin; Created 1854	1850s	Morganton			Wooden structure.	Destroyed by fire in 18??.	
Fannin; Created 1854	1896	Blue Ridge			Two-story brick structure.	Destroyed by fire on 4 July 1936.	34.864009°N 84.327395°W
Fannin; Created 1854	1937	Blue Ridge	Fannin County Courthouse		Neoclassical	Still in existence. Currently The Georgia Mountain Center for the Arts. NRHP-listed (refnum 95000716).	34.863839°N 84.327101°W
Fannin; Created 1854	2004	Blue Ridge			Modern		34.864205°N 84.326654°W
Fayette; Created 1821	1825	Fayetteville	Fayette County Courthouse			Remodelled in 1965 into a three-story building. A fire set by an arsonist destroyed the third floor on 11 April 1981. Restored in 1985. NRHP-listed (refnum 80001020).	33.448135°N 84.454617°W
Fayette; Created 1821	1985	Fayetteville			Modern		
Fayette; Created 1821	2003	Fayetteville	Fayette County Justice Center		Modern		33.442309°N 84.451048°W
Floyd; Created 1832	1833	Livingston			Log cabin		
Floyd; Created 1832	1840	Rome					
Floyd; Created 1832	18??	Rome				Two-story brick structure. Used as a schoolhouse for a number of years after 1893.	34.253942°N 85.168769°W
Floyd; Created 1832	1893	Rome	Floyd County Courthouse		Two-story brick structure.	Moved a few blocks away from its original location in the 1890s to make room for the construction of the Federal Courthouse. Tower added after move. Destroyed by fire in March 2026.	34.255943°N 85.171279°W
Floyd; Created 1832	1896	Rome	Floyd County Administration Building			Originally a post office and federal courthouse. Opened as the county courthouse in 1978. Still in existence. NRHP-listed (refnum 80001067).	34.253852°N 85.171277°W
Floyd; Created 1832	1995	Rome			Modern		34.255543°N 85.172097°W
Forsyth; Created 1832	1833	Cumming				Destroyed by fire in 1900.	
Forsyth; Created 1832	1905	Cumming			Two-story brick structure.	Destroyed by fire in November 1973.	
Forsyth; Created 1832	1977	Cumming			Four-story colonial revival.		34.206486°N 84.139707°W
Forsyth; Created 1832	1996	Cumming	Forsyth County Administration Building		Modern		34.206440°N 84.138622°W
Franklin; Created 1784	1793	Unknown					
Franklin; Created 1784	1826	Carnesville					
Franklin; Created 1784	1906	Carnesville	Franklin County Courthouse			NRHP-listed (refnum 80001069).	34.369924°N 83.234615°W
Fulton; Created 1853	1854	Atlanta				Structure doubled as the Atlanta city hall. Demolished in 1877 to make room for the Georgia State Capitol.	33.750833°N 84.390833°W
Fulton; Created 1853	1882	Atlanta			Two-story brick structure.	Demolished 1911.	33.750833°N 84.390833°W
Fulton; Created 1853	1914	Atlanta	Fulton County Courthouse		Beaux-Arts/Neoclassical	NRHP-listed (refnum 80001074).	33.750833°N 84.390833°W
Gilmer; Created 1832	1833	Ellijay			Wooden structure.		
Gilmer; Created 1832	1854	Ellijay					
Gilmer; Created 1832	1898	Ellijay	Gilmer County Courthouse	Link to image		Built as a hotel in 1898. Became the county courthouses in 1934. Condemned in 2003. Demolished 7 January 2008. NRHP-listed (refnum 80001081).	34.694992°N 84.483339°W
Gilmer; Created 1832	2008	Ellijay					34.694992°N 84.483339°W
Glascock; Created 1857	1858	Gibson				Became a private residence upon the construction of the next courthouse.	
Glascock; Created 1857	1919	Gibson	Glascock County Courthouse		Neoclassical	NRHP-listed (refnum 80001082).	33.233074°N 82.594583°W
Glynn; Created 1777	1817	Brunswick				It is unknown what courthouses were used earlier than the one before this period.	
Glynn; Created 1777	1840	Brunswick			Two-story wooden schoolhouse	For several decades in the 1800s Glynn County rented space at several locations including the Glynn County Academy. Still in existence.	31.14763°N 81.49086°W Not currently at its original location.
Glynn; Created 1777	1876	Brunswick			Two-story wooden structure	Damaged by the 1896 Cedar Keys hurricane. It was demolished in March 1898.	31.14763°N 81.493904°W
Glynn; Created 1777	1889	Brunswick				Immediately after the 1896 hurricane the county court offices moved into Brunswick city hall and stayed there for over a year.	31.146043°N 81.494524°W
Glynn; Created 1777	1899	Brunswick			Three-story brick structure	After the county offices moved into the 1907 courthouse, the old courthouse was remodeled and became a bank.	
Glynn; Created 1777	1907	Brunswick	Old Glynn County Courthouse		Neoclassical	Still in existence.	31.152915°N 81.494648°W
Glynn; Created 1777	1991	Brunswick					31.154313°N 81.495073°W
Gordon; Created 1850	1852	Calhoun			Two-story brick structure.	Destroyed by a storm in 1888.	
Gordon; Created 1850	1889	Calhoun			Two-story brick structure.		34.502481°N 84.950843°W
Gordon; Created 1850	1961	Calhoun					34.502481°N 84.950843°W
Grady; Created 1905	1908	Cairo			Three-story brick structure.	Destroyed by fire on 18 February 1980.	30.878593°N 84.207661°W
Grady; Created 1905	1985	Cairo			Neoclassical		30.878593°N 84.207661°W
Greene; Created 1786	1787	Greensboro			Wooden structure.	Destroyed by Native Americans in an attack. What served as the courthouse for the next sixty years is unknown.	
Greene; Created 1786	1849	Greensboro	Greene County Courthouse		Greek Revival	Remodelled in 1938. NRHP-listed (refnum 80001083).	33.576667°N 83.182222°W
Gwinnett; Created 1818	1820	Lawrenceville			Log cabin		
Gwinnett; Created 1818	1820s	Lawrenceville			Log cabin.		
Gwinnett; Created 1818	1824	Lawrenceville			Brick structure.	Destroyed by fire on 10 September 1871.	
Gwinnett; Created 1818	1872	Lawrenceville			Brick structure.	Demolished in 1884.	
Gwinnett; Created 1818	1884	Lawrenceville	Gwinnett County Courthouse		Romanesque Revival	Still in existence. NRHP-listed (refnum 80001084).	33.956667°N 83.989167°W
Gwinnett; Created 1818	1988	Lawrenceville	Gwinnett Justice and Administration Center		Modern		33.951447°N 83.993081°W
Habersham; Created 1818	1821	Clarkesville			Wooden structure	Moved in 1832 to the side of the courthouse square and became a bank.	
Habersham; Created 1818	1832	Clarkesville			Two-story brick structure.	Damaged by a mysterious explosion in 1898.	
Habersham; Created 1818	1898	Clarkesville			Brick structure.	Destroyed by fire on 2 December 1923.	
Habersham; Created 1818	19??	Clarkesville			Brick structure.	Demolished in 1963.	
Habersham; Created 1818	1963	Clarkesville	Habersham County Courthouse		Modern		34.608750°N 83.524211°W
Hall; Created 1818	1818				Log cabin		
Hall; Created 1818	1820					Built halfway bestween Mule Camp Springs and Redwine Springs.	
Hall; Created 1818	1832	Gainesville			Brick courthouse.	Gutted by a fire on 19 December 1851.	
Hall; Created 1818	1850s	Gainesville				Destroyed by fire in 1882.	
Hall; Created 1818	1884	Gainesville				Destroyed by a tornado in 1936.	34.298823°N 83.825437°W
Hall; Created 1818	1937	Gainesville	Old Hall County Courthouse		Stripped Classicism	A modern style addition was built in 1975. NRHP-listed (refnum 95000717).	34.298995°N 83.825563°W
Hall; Created 1818	2002	Gainesville			Modern		34.299299°N 83.824623°W
Hancock; Created 1793	1790s	Sparta			Wooden structure.		
Hancock; Created 1793	1800s	Sparta			Two-story brick structure.		
Hancock; Created 1793	1883	Sparta	Hancock County Courthouse		Second Empire	Destroyed by fire on 11 August 2014.	33.275180°N 82.976161°W
Hancock; Created 1793	2016	Sparta			Second Empire	Almost identical to the previous courthouse.	33.275180°N 82.976161°W
Haralson; Created 1856	1891	Buchanan	Haralson County Courthouse		Queen Anne	Information about previous courthouses is unknown. Currently the location of the Haralson County Historical Society. NRHP-listed (refnum 74000688).	33.801667°N 85.189722°W
Haralson; Created 1856	1972	Buchanan			Modern		33.802091°N 85.181763°W
Harris; Created 1827	1820s	Hamilton			Log cabin		
Harris; Created 1827	1831	Hamilton					
Harris; Created 1827	1908	Hamilton	Harris County Courthouse		Neoclassical	NRHP-listed (refnum 80001089).	32.758611°N 84.874722°W
Hart; Created 1853	1854	Hartwell			Two-story wooden structure.		
Hart; Created 1853	1856	Hartwell				Destroyed by fire in 1900.	34.353004°N 82.932429°W
Hart; Created 1853	1902	Hartwell				Destroyed by fire in 1967.	34.353004°N 82.932429°W
Hart; Created 1853	1971	Hartwell	Hart County Courthouse		Modern		34.353004°N 82.932429°W
Heard; Created 1830	183?	Franklin				Destroyed by fire in April 1839.	
Heard; Created 1830	183?	Franklin				Destroyed by fire on 10 March 1894.	
Heard; Created 1830	1894	Franklin					
Heard; Created 1830	1964	Franklin	Heard County Courthouse		Modern		33.279253°N 85.097940°W
Henry; Created 1821	1823	McDonough				Destroyed by fire in 1823.	
Henry; Created 1821	1831	McDonough			Brick structure.		
Henry; Created 1821	1897	McDonough	Henry County Courthouse		Romanesque Revival	Renovated in 1980–1981. NRHP-listed (refnum 80001092).	33.44786°N 84.14674°W
Houston; Created 1821	1825	Perry			Two-story wooden structure		32.457716°N 83.733832°W
Houston; Created 1821	1856	Perry			Two-story brick structure	Demolished October 1948.	32.457716°N 83.733832°W
Houston; Created 1821	1950	Perry	Houston County Courthouse			Still in existence.	32.457716°N 83.733832°W
Houston; Created 1821	2002	Perry			Modern		32.468778°N 83.701407°W
Irwin; Created 1818	1820s					Located on maps at Irwin County Courthouse.	
Irwin; Created 1818	1839	Irwinville					31.647993°N 83.383993°W
Irwin; Created 1818	1854	Irwinville					31.647993°N 83.383993°W
Irwin; Created 1818	1883	Irwinville				Used as apartment housing for the Irwinville Farms Project in the 1930s after the county seat was moved to Ocilla, Georgia.	31.647993°N 83.383993°W
Irwin; Created 1818	1910	Ocilla	Irwin County Courthouse		Neoclassical	NRHP-listed (refnum 80001095).	31.591774°N 83.251185°W
Jackson; Created 1796	1799	Clarkesboro					
Jackson; Created 1796	1800	Jefferson			Wooden structure.		
Jackson; Created 1796	1820	Jefferson			Brick structure.		
Jackson; Created 1796	1879	Jefferson	Jackson County Courthouse		Neoclassical	NRHP-listed (refnum 80001096).	34.118333°N 83.574444°W
Jackson; Created 1796	2004	Jefferson					34.139575°N 83.559913°W
Jasper; Created 1807	1808	Monticello			Log cabin		
Jasper; Created 1807	1838	Monticello			Three-story brick structure.		33.304410°N 83.684152°W
Jasper; Created 1807	1907	Monticello	Jasper County Courthouse		Neoclassical	NRHP-listed (refnum 80001097).	33.304722°N 83.683611°W
Jeff Davis; Created 1905	1907	Hazlehurst	Jeff Davis County Courthouse		Neoclassical	Renovated in 1975, and again in 1994–1995. NRHP-listed (refnum 80001098).	31.8625°N 82.600833°W
Jefferson; Created 1796	1796	Louisville			Red brick Georgian	From 1806 to 1816, several private residences served as the county courthouse. In 1816, the former Georgia State Capitol in Louisville was purchased for use as the county courthouse.	32.998056°N 82.408611°W
Jefferson; Created 1796	1848	Louisville				Used some of the materials from the old state capitol. Destroyed by fire in 1861.	32.998056°N 82.408611°W
Jefferson; Created 1796	18??	Louisville					32.998056°N 82.408611°W
Jefferson; Created 1796	1904	Louisville	Jefferson County Courthouse		Neoclassical	Damaged by fire in 1938. NRHP-listed (refnum 80001099).	32.998056°N 82.408611°W
Jenkins; Created 1905	190?	Millen				Destroyed by fire on 18 January 1909.	
Jenkins; Created 1905	1910	Millen	Jenkins County Courthouse		Neoclassical	NRHP-listed (refnum 80001100).	32.804167°N 81.939167°W
Johnson; Created 1858	1859	Wrightsville			Wooden structure.		
Johnson; Created 1858	1895	Wrightsville	Johnson County Courthouse		Romanesque Revival/Colonial Revival	Remodelled in 1938. A major restoration happened in 1996. NRHP-listed (refnum 80001101).	32.729943°N 82.719122°W
Jones; Created 1807	1816	Clinton				Previously court was held at private residences.	
Jones; Created 1807	1905	Gray	Jones County Courthouse		Romanesque Revival	NRHP-listed (refnum 80001102).	33.00823°N 83.53665°W
Lamar; Created 1920	1931	Barnesville	Lamar County Courthouse		Neoclassical	Court previously held at the Barnesville Masonic Hall. NRHP-listed (refnum 80001103).	33.052222°N 84.156111°W
Lanier; Created 1920	1921	Lakeland					31.041496°N 83.075595°W
Lanier; Created 1920	1973	Lakeland	Lanier County Courthouse		Modern		31.041496°N 83.075595°W
Laurens; Created 1807	1811	Dublin					
Laurens; Created 1807	18??	Dublin			Two-story wooden structure.		32.540115°N 82.903778°W
Laurens; Created 1807	1895	Dublin			Two-story brick structure.		32.540115°N 82.903778°W
Laurens; Created 1807	1962	Dublin	Laurens County Courthouse		Modern		32.540115°N 82.903778°W
Lee; Created 1825	182?	Sumterville					
Lee; Created 1825	1837	Stark(s)ville					
Lee; Created 1825	1854	Webster				Destroyed by fire in 1856.	
Lee; Created 1825	1837	Stark(s)ville				The old Stark(s)ville courthouse was used again when the county seat was moved back to Stark(s)ville in 1856. Destroyed by fire on 19 March 1858.	
Lee; Created 1825	1861	Stark(s)ville					
Lee; Created 1825	1872	Leesburg				Destroyed by fire in 1872.	
Lee; Created 1825	N/A	Leesburg				An unfinished courthouse was sold in 1874.	
Lee; Created 1825	1880	Leesburg					
Lee; Created 1825	1918	Leesburg	Lee County Courthouse		Neoclassical	NRHP-listed (refnum 80001104).	31.732683°N 84.171099°W
Liberty; Created 1777	1849	Hinesville				It is unknown what if anything was previously used as a courthouse.	
Liberty; Created 1777	1867	Hinesville					
Liberty; Created 1777	1926	Hinesville	Liberty County Courthouse		Neoclassical	Extensive additions were built in 1965. NRHP-listed (refnum 80001105).	31.84769°N 81.59577°W
Lincoln; Created 1796	1800	Lincolnton			Stone structure.		
Lincoln; Created 1796	1874	Lincolnton			Two-story structure.		
Lincoln; Created 1796	1915	Lincolnton	Lincoln County Courthouse		Neoclassical	NRHP-listed (refnum 80001106).	33.794444°N 82.475833°W
Long; Created 1920	1926	Ludowici	Long County Courthouse		Neoclassical	NRHP-listed (refnum 80001107).	31.70775°N 81.74151°W
Lowndes; Created 1825	1828	Franklinville			Log cabin	Previously court was held at private residences.	
Lowndes; Created 1825	1837	Troupville			Two-story wooden structure.		
Lowndes; Created 1825	1842	Troupville			Two-story wooden structure.	Destroyed by fire on 22 June 1858 by an arsonist.	
Lowndes; Created 1825	1860	Valdosta			One-story wooden structure.	Sold for $73 by 1869. The local Christian Church was used as a courthouse in 1870.	30.83253°N 83.27855°W
Lowndes; Created 1825	1874	Valdosta			Two-story red brick structure.	Demolished March 1904.	30.832492°N 83.279298°W
Lowndes; Created 1825	1905	Valdosta	Lowndes County Courthouse		Neoclassical	Still in existence. Used for storage. NRHP-listed (refnum 80001110).	30.832492°N 83.279298°W
Lowndes; Created 1825	2010	Valdosta	Lowndes County Judicial and Administrative Complex		Modern		30.834313°N 83.279017°W
Lumpkin; Created 1832	1832	Auraria			Log cabin		
Lumpkin; Created 1832	1836	Dahlonega	Lumpkin County Courthouse		Two-story brick structure.	Still in existence. Currently the Dahlonega Gold Museum.	34.53267°N 83.98488°W
Lumpkin; Created 1832	1965	Dahlonega			Modern		34.529075°N 83.976033°W
Macon; Created 1837	1838	Lanier				Moved to Ellaville, Georgia in 1856. Still in existence as of 1978.	
Macon; Created 1837	1850s	Oglethorpe				Destroyed by fire on 25 February 1857.	
Macon; Created 1837	1850s	Oglethorpe				Still in existence as of 1978.	
Macon; Created 1837	1894	Oglethorpe	Macon County Courthouse		Romanesque Revival	NRHP-listed (refnum 80001113).	32.293315°N 84.060014°W
Madison; Created 1811	18??	Danielsville			Wooden structure.		
Madison; Created 1811	18??	Danielsville			Wooden structure.		
Madison; Created 1811	1901	Danielsville	Madison County Courthouse			NRHP-listed (refnum 80001114).	34.124444°N 83.221389°W
Madison; Created 1811	19??	Danielsville	Madison County Government Complex			In 1997, the county renovated a former elementary school into the new county courthouse.	34.121715°N 83.221312°W
Marion; Created 1827	1829	Horry					
Marion; Created 1827	1839	Tazewell				Destroyed by fire on 5 November 1845.	
Marion; Created 1827	1848	Tazewell	Old Marion County Courthouse			Currently the Marion Lodge No. 14 F. & A.M; NRHP-listed (refnum 80001116).	32.380556°N 84.440833°W
Marion; Created 1827	1850	Buena Vista					
Marion; Created 1827	1928	Buena Vista	Marion County Courthouse		Neoclassical	NRHP-listed (refnum 80001115).	32.318333°N 84.5175°W
McDuffie; Created 1870	1872	Thomson	McDuffie County Courthouse			Wings were added on to the courthouse in 1934.	33.467867°N 82.499167°W
McIntosh; Created 1793	179?	Darien				Still in existence during the 1830s.	
McIntosh; Created 1793	1800	Darien				Burned by Union troops during the American Civil War in 1863.	
McIntosh; Created 1793	n/a	Darien				Destroyed by fire on 25 January 1873 while almost complete. It had already been occupied by county offices.	
McIntosh; Created 1793	1873	Darien	McIntosh County Courthouse		Tabby structure.	Damaged by a fire in 1931 and subsequently remodelled. Additions made in 1973. Damaged by a fire set by arsonists on 7 December 1981.	31.369765°N 81.434023°W
Meriwether; Created 1827	1832	Greenville				Damaged by a tornado on 3 March 1893, but rebuilt.	33.028665°N 84.713065°W
Meriwether; Created 1827	1904	Greenville	Meriwether County Courthouse		Neoclassical	Gutted by a fire on 27 January 1976, but rebuilt with the interior substantially altered. NRHP-listed (refnum 73000630).	33.028665°N 84.713065°W
Miller; Created 1856	1850s	Colquitt					
Miller; Created 1856	18??	Colquitt				Destroyed by fire in 1873.	
Miller; Created 1856	18??	Colquitt			Two-story brick structure.	Destroyed by fire in 1974.	31.171660°N 84.733988°W
Miller; Created 1856	1977	Colquitt	Miller County Courthouse		Modern		31.171660°N 84.733988°W
Milton; Created 1857; Merged with Fulton in 1932	1858	Alpharetta					
Milton; Created 1857; Merged with Fulton in 1932	1876	Alpharetta			Two-story structure.	Demolished in 1955.	
Mitchell; Created 1857	1858	Camilla			Two-story wooden structure.	Destroyed by fire on 7 January 1867.	
Mitchell; Created 1857	1868	Camilla			Two-story wooden structure.		
Mitchell; Created 1857	1890	Camilla				Two-story brick structure.	31.171660°N 84.209125°W
Mitchell; Created 1857	1936	Camilla	Mitchell County Courthouse		Stripped Classicism/Art Deco	Constructed by the WPA.	31.171660°N 84.209125°W
Monroe; Created 1821	1825	Forsyth			Two-story brick structure.	Demolished in 1895 or 1896.	33.034167°N 83.938889°W
Monroe; Created 1821	1896	Forsyth	Monroe County Courthouse		High Victorian Gothic	NRHP-listed (refnum 80001121).	33.034167°N 83.938889°W
Montgomery; Created 1793	1797	the plantation of Arthur Lott					
Montgomery; Created 1793	1810s	Mount Vernon					
Montgomery; Created 1793	1830s	Mount Vernon					
Montgomery; Created 1793	18??	Mount Vernon				How many courthouses existed in the 1800s is unknown.	
Montgomery; Created 1793	1907	Mount Vernon	Montgomery County Courthouse		Neoclassical	NRHP-listed (refnum 80001122).	32.174205°N 82.594634°W
Morgan; Created 1807	1809	Madison			Red brick structure.	Destroyed by fire on 1 September 1844.	
Morgan; Created 1807	1845	Madison				Converted into office space in 1905; Destroyed by fire in 1916.	
Morgan; Created 1807	1905	Madison	Morgan County Courthouse		Beaux-Arts		33.59574°N 83.46638°W
Murray; Created 1832	1886	Spring Place				It is unknown what courthouses existed before 1886. Became a schoolhouse after the county seat was moved.	
Murray; Created 1832	1917	Chatsworth	Murray County Courthouse		Neoclassical	NRHP-listed (refnum 80001123).	34.766944°N 84.770556°W
Muscogee; Created 1826	1830	Columbus			Wooden structure.	Destroyed by fire on 15 October 1838.	
Muscogee; Created 1826	1838	Columbus			Three-story brick structure.		
Muscogee; Created 1826	1896	Columbus				Demolished in 1973.	32.463517°N 84.991070°W
Muscogee; Created 1826	1973	Columbus	Muscogee County Courthouse		Modern		32.463517°N 84.991070°W
Newton; Created 1821	1821				Log cabin	Ten miles east of present-day Covington	
Newton; Created 1821	1823	Covington					
Newton; Created 1821	18??	Covington				Destroyed by fire on 31 December 1883.	
Newton; Created 1821	1884	Covington	Newton County Courthouse		Second Empire	NRHP-listed (refnum 80001216).	33.596944°N 83.860278°W
Oconee; Created 1875	1875	Watkinvsille				Destroyed by fire on 6 May 1938.	
Oconee; Created 1875	1939	Watkinvsille	Oconee County Courthouse		Stripped Classicism	Constructed by the WPA.	33.863428°N 83.409989°W
Oglethorpe; Created 1793	1790s	Woodstock				Some sources say that the first courthouse was built on the Salem Road near present-day Lexington and then moved to Lexington when it became the county seat in 1806.	
Oglethorpe; Created 1793	1806	Lexington				There were possibly more courthouses between 1806 and 1887.	
Oglethorpe; Created 1793	1887	Lexington	Oglethorpe County Courthouse		Romanesque Revival	Remodelled in 1992–1993.	33.869215°N 83.111556°W
Paulding; Created 1832	1830s	Van Wert				Destroyed by fire in 18??	
Paulding; Created 1832	18??	Van Wert					
Paulding; Created 1832	1850s	Dallas					
Paulding; Created 1832	1892	Dallas	Paulding County Courthouse		Queen Anne	Renovated 1956, 1984–85, and 1991. Target of arson in March 2001, but survived. NRHP-listed (refnum 80001218).	33.924097°N 84.841389°W
Peach; Created 1924	1936	Fort Valley	Peach County Courthouse		Colonial Revival	Damaged by fire on 8 December 1969. NRHP-listed (refnum 80001219).	32.55333°N 83.88807°W
Pickens; Created 1853	1859	Jasper			Brick structure.	Demolished in 1888.	
Pickens; Created 1853	1888	Jasper				Destroyed by fire in 1947.	34.469165°N 84.429806°W
Pickens; Created 1853	1949	Jasper	Pickens County Courthouse		Stripped Classicism	NRHP-listed (refnum 08000352).	34.469165°N 84.429806°W
Pierce; Created 1857	1858	Blackshear				Destroyed by fire on 11 March 1875.	
Pierce; Created 1857	1875	Blackshear			Two-story wooden structure.	Still in existence. Sold in 1902 and moved a few blocks away to be used as a private residence.	
Pierce; Created 1857	1902	Blackshear	Pierce County Courthouse		Neoclassical	Remodeled in the 1970s. NRHP-listed (refnum 80001220).	31.30659°N 82.2429°W
Pike; Created 1822	1820s	Newnan			Wooden structure.		
Pike; Created 1822	1825	Zebulon					
Pike; Created 1822	1895	Zebulon	Pike County Courthouse		Romanesque Revival/Colonial Revival	NRHP-listed (refnum 80001222).	33.102222°N 84.342222°W
Polk; Created 1851	1852	Cedartown				Destroyed by fire in 1864 by Union troops during the American Civil War	
Polk; Created 1851	1867	Cedartown			Two-story brick structure	Destroyed by fire in 1887.	
Polk; Created 1851	1889	Cedartown			Single-story brick structure	Clock tower removed in the 1930s Demolished in 1951.	34.013720°N 85.255800°W
Polk; Created 1851	1951	Cedartown	Polk County Courthouse		Stripped Classicism		34.013720°N 85.255800°W
Polk; Created 1851	1935	Cedartown	Polk County Courthouse No. 2			In 1984 the county renovated the former Cedartown City Hall and made it "Courthouse No. 2".	34.013583°N 85.254918°W
Pulaski; Created 1808	1812	Hartford				Moved across the Ocmulgee River in 1836 when the county seat was moved to Hawkinsville. Moved across the street and became a hotel in 1872.	
Pulaski; Created 1808	1874	Hawkinsville	Pulaski County Courthouse		Neoclassical	Restored in 1936 by the WPA. NRHP-listed (refnum 80001224).	32.28295°N 83.46902°W
Putnam; Created 1807	1800s	Eatonton					
Putnam; Created 1807	1824	Eatonton	Putnam County Courthouse		Neoclassical	Extensively remodeled several times over the years including most recently in 1906.	33.325809°N 83.388862°W
Quitman; Created 1858	1850s	Georgetown				Destroyed by fire on 1 February 1921. The county lacked the funding for a new courthouse for over a decade.	
Quitman; Created 1858	1939	Georgetown	Quitman County Courthouse		Stripped Classicism/Colonial Revival	Constructed by the WPA. NRHP-listed (refnum 95000718).	31.885833°N 85.109167°W
Rabun; Created 1819	1824	Clayton			Two-story log cabin structure.		
Rabun; Created 1819	1838	Clayton			Two-story log cabin structure.	The wall and floors began to collapse in 1878. It is unknown what served as a courthouse for decades afterwards.	
Rabun; Created 1819	1908	Clayton			Two-story brick structure.		
Rabun; Created 1819	1967	Clayton	Rabun County Courthouse		Modern		34.878939°N 83.403096°W
Randolph; Created 1828	1837	Cuthbert			Wooden structure.		
Randolph; Created 1828	1840s	Cuthbert			Brick structure.		
Randolph; Created 1828	1886	Cuthbert	Randolph County Courthouse		Queen Anne	Named in Georgia Trust for Historic Preservation's 2012 Places in Peril List; Renovated in the 2010s.	31.771324°N 84.789279°W
Randolph; Created 1828	2005	Cuthbert			Modern		31.766769°N 84.786869°W
Richmond; Created 1777	1780s	Augusta				Richmond County purchased a preexisting building in 1785 to house multiple government-related facilities. The building doubled as the meeting place for the Georgia General Assembly.	
Richmond; Created 1777	1801	Augusta	Old Government House		Greek Revival	The building served as both Augusta City Hall and Richmond County Courthouse. Became a private residence in 1821. Still in existence. NRHP-listed (refnum 78001004).	33.469167°N 81.959444°W
Richmond; Created 1777	1820	Augusta			Brick structure.	Wings added in 1870. Remodelled in 1892.	33.471259°N 81.961752°W
Richmond; Created 1777	1956	Augusta	Richmond County Courthouse		Modern		33.471259°N 81.961752°W
Richmond; Created 1777	2011	Augusta	Augusta-Richmond County Judicial Center and John H. Ruffin, Jr. Courthouse		Modern		33.469707°N 81.971922°W
Rockdale; Created 1870	1870s	Conyers				It is unknown how many courthouses served between the 1870s and 1939.	
Rockdale; Created 1870	1939	Conyers	Rockdale County Courthouse		Colonial Revival		33.668013°N 84.016838°W
Schley; Created 1857	1858	Ellaville			Brick structure.	Demolished in October 1937.	
Schley; Created 1857	1899	Ellaville	Schley County Courthouse		Romanesque Revival	NRHP-listed (refnum 80001230).	32.23788°N 84.30898°W
Screven; Created 1793	1790s	Jacksonborough					
Screven; Created 1793	1832	Jacksonborough					
Screven; Created 1793	1847	Sylvania				Destroyed by fire in 1864, during the American Civil War by William Tecumseh Sherman's troops.	
Screven; Created 1793	1869	Sylvania			Wooden structure.	Destroyed by fire in early January 1897.	
Screven; Created 1793	1897	Sylvania			Three-story brick structure.	Demolished in 1963.	32.750456°N 81.636401°W
Screven; Created 1793	1964	Sylvania	Screven County Courthouse				32.750695°N 81.644967°W
Seminole; Created 1920	192?	Donalsonville				Destroyed by fire in March 1922.	
Seminole; Created 1920	1922	Donalsonville	Seminole County Courthouse		Beaux-Arts/Neoclassical	NRHP-listed (refnum 80001231).	31.041903°N 84.884823°W
Spalding; Created 1851	1859	Griffin	Spalding County Courthouse		Two-story brick structure.	Converted into the county jail in 1910. NRHP-listed (refnum 00001389).	33.249722°N 84.260556°W
Spalding; Created 1851	1911	Griffin			Three-story brick structure.	Destroyed by fire on 12 January 1981.	33.248380°N 84.262427°W
Spalding; Created 1851	1985	Griffin			Italianate		33.248380°N 84.262427°W
Stephens; Created 1905	1908	Toccoa	Stephens County Courthouse		Neoclassical	Still in existence. NRHP-listed (refnum 80001232).	34.579722°N 83.330833°W
Stephens; Created 1905	2000	Toccoa	Stephens County Government Building		Modern		34.579828°N 83.331849°W
Stewart; Created 1830	1831	Lumpkin			Log cabin		
Stewart; Created 1830	1837	Lumpkin					
Stewart; Created 1830	1896	Lumpkin			Two-story brick structure.	Destroyed by fire on 21 April 1922.	32.050558°N 84.794555°W
Stewart; Created 1830	1923	Lumpkin	Stewart County Courthouse		Neoclassical	Renovated in 1935–1936 by the WPA and again in 1983. NRHP-listed (refnum 80001234).	32.050558°N 84.794555°W
Sumter; Created 1831	1839	Americus			Two-story wooden structure.	Moved to the west side of Jackson Street in 1853.	
Sumter; Created 1831	1853	Americus			Two-story brick structure.		32.072722°N 84.234423°W
Sumter; Created 1831	1888	Americus			Two-story brick structure.	Demolished 1959.	32.073037°N 84.232285°W
Sumter; Created 1831	1959	Americus	Sumter County Courthouse		Modern	Demolished in 2010	32.072006°N 84.238546°W
Sumter; Created 1831	2009	Americus			Italianate		32.071871°N 84.239388°W
Talbot; Created 1827	1831	Talbotton			Brick structure.	Destroyed by fire in 1892.	
Talbot; Created 1827	1892	Talbotton	Talbot County Courthouse		Queen Anne	NRHP-listed (refnum 80001241).	32.676944°N 84.540833°W
Taliaferro; Created 1825	1828	Crawfordville				Demolished in 1901.	
Taliaferro; Created 1825	1902	Crawfordville	Taliaferro County Courthouse		High Victorian Gothic	NRHP-listed (refnum 80001242).	33.554444°N 82.896667°W
Tattnall; Created 1801	1830s	Reidsville					
Tattnall; Created 1801	1857	Reidsville					
Tattnall; Created 1801	1902	Reidsville	Tattnall County Courthouse		Second Empire		32.086757°N 82.118762°W
Taylor; Created 1852	1850s	Butler				Demolished in 1935.	32.557214°N 84.237417°W
Taylor; Created 1852	1935	Butler	Taylor County Courthouse		Neoclassical	NRHP-listed (refnum 95000719).	32.557214°N 84.237417°W
Telfair; Created 1808	1820s	Jacksonville				How many structures existed until 1860 is unknown.	
Telfair; Created 1808	1860	Jacksonville			Two-story wooden structure.		
Telfair; Created 1808	1873	McRae					
Telfair; Created 1808	1888	McRae			Two-story brick structure.		
Telfair; Created 1808	1904	McRae			Two-story brick structure.	Destroyed by fire in 1934.	32.066944°N 82.896667°W
Telfair; Created 1808	1934	McRae	Telfair County Courthouse and Jail		Colonial Revival	NRHP-listed (refnum 95000720). Incorporates the walls of the 1904 courthouse.	32.066944°N 82.896667°W
Terrell; Created 1856	1857	Dawson			Two-story wooden structure.		31.773056°N 84.445833°W
Terrell; Created 1856	1892	Dawson	Terrell County Courthouse		High Victorian Gothic	NRHP-listed (refnum 80001244).	31.773056°N 84.445833°W
Thomas; Created 1825	1820s	Thomasville			Log cabin		
Thomas; Created 1825	18??	Thomasville			Wooden structure.	Damaged by a storm in 1852.	30.838889°N 83.981944°W
Thomas; Created 1825	1858	Thomasville	Thomas County Courthouse			Remodelled in 1888. Renovated in 1909, 1918, 1922, and 1937. NRHP-listed (refnum 70000224).	30.838889°N 83.981944°W
Thomas; Created 1825	2009	Thomasville	Thomas County Judicial Center				30.838930°N 83.983416°W
Tift; Created 1905	1913	Tifton	Tift County Courthouse		Beaux-Arts	NRHP-listed (refnum 80001245).	31.45437°N 83.50803°W
Toombs; Created 1905	1906	Lyons			Brick structure.	Destroyed by fire in 1917.	
Toombs; Created 1905	1919	Lyons					
Toombs; Created 1905	1964	Lyons	Toombs County Courthouse		Modern	Demolished in February 2024.	
Toombs; Created 1905	2023	Lyons	Toombs County Government Center				32.203022°N 82.328662°W
Towns; Created 1856	1857	Hiawassee					
Towns; Created 1856	1905	Hiawassee					
Towns; Created 1856	1964	Hiawassee	Towns County Courthouse				34.946741°N 83.757434°W
Treutlen; Created 1918	1920	Soperton	Treutlen County Courthouse		Neoclassical	NRHP-listed (refnum 80001246).	32.37717°N 82.59336°W
Troup; Created 1826	1830	LaGrange			Two-story brick structure.	Demolished 1903/1904.	33.039069°N 85.031620°W
Troup; Created 1826	1904	LaGrange			Three-story brick structure.	Destroyed by fire on 4 November 1936.	33.039069°N 85.031620°W
Troup; Created 1826	1939	LaGrange	Troup County Courthouse		Stripped Classicism	NRHP-listed (refnum 95000721). Currently the Chattahoochee Valley Art Museum/LaGrange Art Museum	33.040421°N 85.030865°W
Troup; Created 1826	2001	LaGrange	Troup County Government Center		Modern		33.039682°N 85.030789°W
Turner; Created 1905	1907	Ashburn	Turner County Courthouse		Neoclassical	NRHP-listed (refnum 80001247).	31.707673°N 83.652558°W
Twiggs; Created 1809	1812	Marion					
Twiggs; Created 1809	1825	Jeffersonville			Two-story wooden structure.	Disassembled in 1868 and moved to Jeffersonville. Destroyed by fire on 7 February 1901.	
Twiggs; Created 1809	1904	Jeffersonville	Twiggs County Courthouse		Romanesque Revival	Renovated in 1979 and again in 1996–2003.	32.687714°N 83.345720°W
Union; Created 1832	1830s	Blairsville			Log cabin.	Destroyed by fire in May 1856.	
Union; Created 1832	1859	Blairsville			Two-story brick structure.	Destroyed by fire in 1898.	
Union; Created 1832	1899	Blairsville	Old Union County Courthouse			NRHP-listed (refnum 80001249).	34.876111°N 83.9585°W
Union; Created 1832	1976	Blairsville			Modern		34.878515°N 83.960703°W
Upson; Created 1824	1828	Thomaston			Brick structure.	Demolished in 1852.	
Upson; Created 1824	1852	Thomaston				Bricks from the previous courthouse were used for the first floor. The second floor was wooden.	32.8875°N 84.326667°W
Upson; Created 1824	1908	Thomaston	Upson County Courthouse		Neoclassical	NRHP-listed (refnum 80001251).	32.8875°N 84.326667°W
Walker; Created 1833	1838	LaFayette				Destroyed by fire on 2 February 1883.	
Walker; Created 1833	1883	LaFayette					
Walker; Created 1833	1919	LaFayette	Walker County Courthouse		Beaux-Arts	NRHP-listed (refnum 80001254).	34.704369°N 85.280618°W
Walton; Created 1818	1823	Monroe					
Walton; Created 1818	1845	Monroe					
Walton; Created 1818	1884	Monroe	Walton County Courthouse		Second Empire	Clocktower built in 1910; Renovated in 1933 and 1996.	33.794444°N 83.7125°W
Ware; Created 1824	1825	Waresborough			Log cabin		31.248672°N 82.474639°W
Ware; Created 1824	18??	Waresborough			Wooden structure.	Dismantled and moved to Waycross after the courthouse there was destroyed in 1874.	31.248672°N 82.474639°W; 31.214312°N 82.355154°W
Ware; Created 1824	1873	Waycross				Destroyed by fire on 13 October 1874.	31.214312°N 82.355154°W
Ware; Created 1824	1891	Waycross			Three-story brick structure.		31.214312°N 82.355154°W
Ware; Created 1824	1957	Waycross	Ware County Courthouse				31.214312°N 82.355154°W
Warren; Created 1793	1809	Warrenton					
Warren; Created 1793	1820s	Warrenton				Destroyed by fire on 23 April 1854 along with a large portion of the town.	
Warren; Created 1793	18??	Warrenton				Destroyed by fire on 6 April 1909.	33.406667°N 82.6625°W
Warren; Created 1793	1910	Warrenton	Warren County Courthouse		Neoclassical	NRHP-listed (refnum 80001259).	33.406667°N 82.6625°W
Washington; Created 1784	1780s	Warthen			Log cabin		
Washington; Created 1784	1796	Sandersville				Destroyed by fire on 25 March 1855 along with most of the town.	32.983333°N 82.811944°W
Washington; Created 1784	1856	Sandersville			Brick structure	Destroyed by fire on 27 November 1864 by William Tecumseh Sherman's troops in response to Confederate troops firing at them from it during the American Civil War.	32.983333°N 82.811944°W
Washington; Created 1784	1869	Sandersville	Washington County Courthouse		High Victorian Gothic/Second Empire		32.983333°N 82.811944°W
Wayne; Created 1803	1860				Wooden structure.	The county seat of Wayne County changed every few years for several decades and it is uncertain what was used before 1860. Built in the woods northwest of Waynesville.	
Wayne; Created 1803	1870s	Jesup			Two-story wooden structure.	Became Hotel Wayne after 1903 for an unknown number of years.	
Wayne; Created 1803	1903	Jesup	Wayne County Courthouse		Romanesque Revival	NRHP-listed (refnum 80001261). Severely damaged by fire on 26 September 2025. The Wayne County Courthouse made the Georgia Trust for Historic Preservation's 2026 Places in Peril List.	31.604136°N 81.879987°W
Webster; Created 1853	1860	Preston			Wooden structure.	Destroyed by fire on 28 September 1914.	32.066324°N 84.537085°W
Webster; Created 1853	1915	Preston	Webster County Courthouse		Neoclassical	NRHP-listed (refnum 80001262).	32.066324°N 84.537085°W
Wheeler; Created 1912	1914	Alamo				Destroyed by fire on 3 March 1916.	
Wheeler; Created 1912	1917	Alamo	Wheeler County Courthouse		Neoclassical	Renovated in 1961. NRHP-listed (refnum 80001263).	32.14813°N 82.7823°W
White; Created 1857	1859	Cleveland	Old White County Courthouse		Georgian	Currently the White County Historical Society; NRHP-listed (refnum 70000226).	34.5971°N 83.76326°W
White; Created 1857	1964	Cleveland			Modern		34.595811°N 83.762948°W
Whitfield; Created 1851	1850s	Dalton				Destroyed by fire in 1864, by the troops of William Tecumseh Sherman during the American Civil War. It is unknown what served as the courthouse for several decades.	
Whitfield; Created 1851	1891	Dalton			Two-story brick structure.	Demolished in 1960.	34.772448°N 84.971268°W
Whitfield; Created 1851	1961	Dalton			Modern	Absorbed by the 2006 structure.	34.772448°N 84.971268°W
Whitfield; Created 1851	2006	Dalton	Whitfield County Courthouse		Modern		34.772448°N 84.971268°W
Wilcox; Created 1857	1858	Abbeville			Wooden structure.	Destroyed by fire on 24 March 1878.	
Wilcox; Created 1857	1870s	Abbeville			Two-story wooden structure.	Fate unknown	31.9925°N 83.306667°W
Wilcox; Created 1857	1903	Abbeville	Wilcox County Courthouse		Neoclassical	NRHP-listed (refnum 80001265).	31.9925°N 83.306667°W
Wilkes; Created 1777	1785	Washington		Log cabin			
Wilkes; Created 1777	1786	Washington			Clapboard		33.737334°N 82.739176°W
Wilkes; Created 1777	1804	Washington			Two-story wooden structure		33.737334°N 82.739176°W
Wilkes; Created 1777	1817	Washington				Demolished in 1902.	33.737334°N 82.739176°W
Wilkes; Created 1777	1904	Washington	Wilkes County Courthouse		Richardsonian Romanesque	Damaged by fire on 24 December 1958, but repaired. Restored to pre-1958 appearance in 1989.	33.738056°N 82.738889°W
Wilkinson; Created 1803	1810s	Irwinton					
Wilkinson; Created 1803	1810s	Irwinton					
Wilkinson; Created 1803	1829	Irwinton				Destroyed by fire in 1829.	
Wilkinson; Created 1803	18??	Irwinton				Destroyed by fire on 7 February 1854.	
Wilkinson; Created 1803	1850s	Irwinton				Destroyed by fire in 1864, by William Tecumseh Sherman's during the American Civil War	
Wilkinson; Created 1803	18??	Irwinton				Destroyed by fire on 14 February 1924.	
Wilkinson; Created 1803	1924	Irwinton	Wilkinson County Courthouse		Colonial Revival		32.810593°N 83.174189°W
Worth; Created 1853	1854	Isabella			Two-story wooden structure.	Destroyed by fire on 26 January 1879. A schoolhouse was used after the fire until it too was destroyed by a fire on 24 October 1880.	
Worth; Created 1853	1887	Isabella				Destroyed by fire on 9 August 1893.	
Worth; Created 1853	1905	Sylvester			Neoclassical	NRHP-listed (refnum 80001268). Severely damaged by a fire on 27 January 1982.	31.527778°N 83.836111°W
Worth; Created 1853	1984	Sylvester	Worth County Courthouse		Neoclassical	Modelled upon the 1905 courthouse.	31.527778°N 83.836111°W

== See also ==
- List of county seats in Georgia
- List of United States federal courthouses in Georgia
