= Columbia County Courthouse =

Columbia County Courthouse may refer to:

- Columbia County Courthouse (Arkansas), Magnolia, Arkansas
- Columbia County Courthouse (Florida), Lake City, Florida
- Columbia County Courthouse (Georgia), Appling, Georgia
- First Columbia County Courthouse, Claverack, New York
- Columbia County Courthouse (Washington), Dayton, Washington, listed on the National Register of Historic Places
