= Jeff Davis County Courthouse =

Jeff Davis County Courthouse may refer to:

- Jeff Davis County Courthouse (Georgia), Hazlehurst, Georgia
- Jeff Davis County Courthouse (Texas), Fort Davis, Texas

== See also ==
- Jefferson Davis County Courthouse, Prentiss, Mississippi
