= List of courthouses in Georgia =

A list of courthouses in Georgia may refer to:

- List of county courthouses in Georgia (U.S. state), county courthouses in the American state of Georgia
- List of United States federal courthouses in Georgia, federal courthouses in the American state of Georgia
- List of courthouses in Georgia (country), courthouses in the country of Georgia
