= Dade County Courthouse (Georgia) =

Historic courthouse in Georgia, US

- U.S. National Register of Historic Places
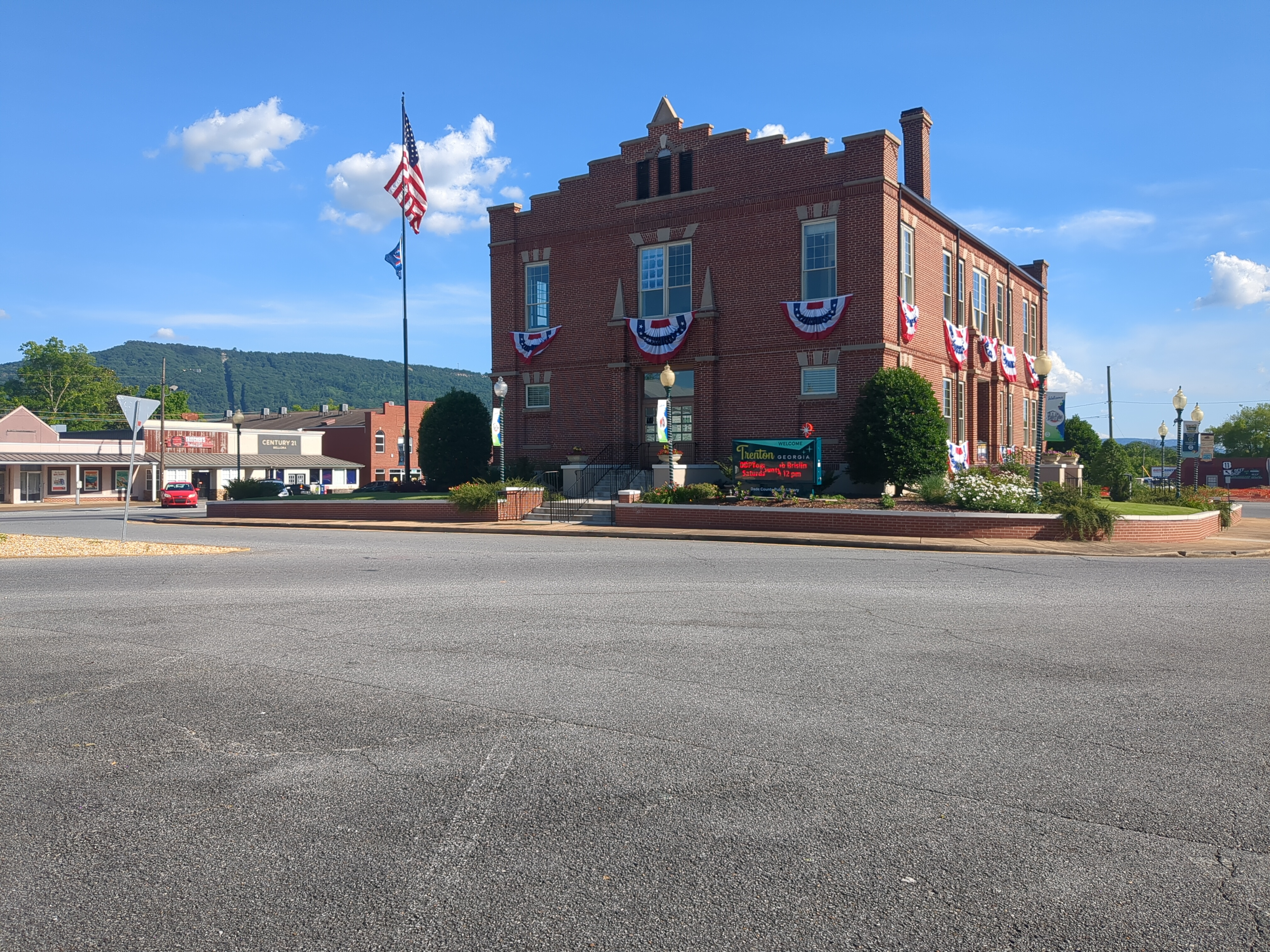

- Location within Georgia Location within the United States
- Location: Courthouse Sq., Trenton, Georgia
- Coordinates: 34°52′20″N 85°30′33″W
- Area: less than one acre
- Built: 1926
- Built by: Barrett Construction Co.
- Architectural style: Carpenter Style
- MPS: Georgia County Courthouses TR
- NRHP reference No.: 80001009
- Added to NRHP: September 18, 1980

The Dade County Courthouse in Trenton, Georgia was built in 1926. It was listed on the National Register of Historic Places in 1980.

It is a two-story brick and concrete building. It was built by Barrett Construction Co. in what has been termed "Carpenter Style", also employed in the 1857 Dawson County Courthouse and the White County Courthouse.
