= Dawson County Courthouse =

Dawson County Courthouse may refer to:

- Dawson County Courthouse (Georgia), Dawsonville, Georgia
- Dawson County Courthouse (Nebraska), Lexington, Nebraska
- Dawson County Courthouse (Texas), Lamesa, Texas
