= Jefferson Davis County Courthouse (disambiguation) =

Jefferson Davis County Courthouse may refer to:

- Jefferson Davis County Courthouse, Prentiss, Mississippi
- Jeff Davis County Courthouse (Georgia), Hazlehurst, Georgia
- Jeff Davis County Courthouse (Texas), Fort Davis, Texas
