= Pulaski County Courthouse (Virginia) =

- U.S. National Register of Historic Places
- Virginia Landmarks Register
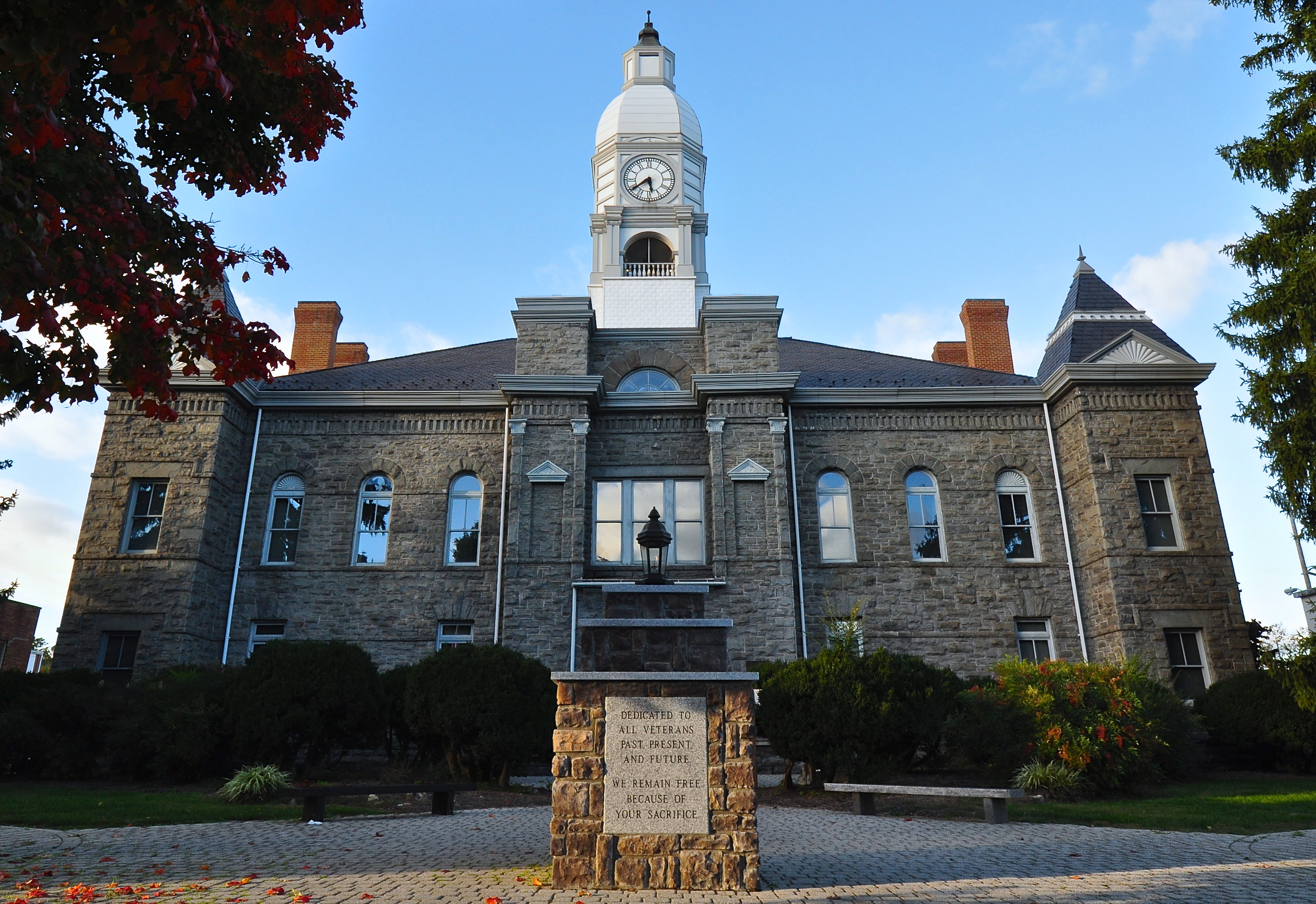
- Pulaski County Courthouse, October 2013

- Location within Virginia Location within the United States
- Interactive map showing the location of Pulaski County Courthouse
- Location: Main St., Pulaski, Virginia
- Coordinates: 37°2′54″N 80°46′53″W
- Area: 1 acre (0.40 ha)
- Built: 1895-1896
- Architect: W. Chamberlin & Co.
- Architectural style: Queen Anne, Romanesque
- NRHP reference No.: 82004582
- VLR No.: 125-0001

Significant dates
- Added to NRHP: July 8, 1982
- Designated VLR: September 15, 1981

Pulaski County Courthouse is a historic courthouse located at Pulaski, Pulaski County, Virginia. It was built in 1895–1896, and is a 2 1/2-story, Romanesque / Queen Anne style roughcut limestone building. The front facade features a projecting central entrance tower. The building has a hipped roof, projecting corner towers, and a classically ornamented belfry covered by an elongated domical roof and capped by a lantern. It was designed by W. Chamberlain & Co.

It was added to the National Register of Historic Places in 1982.

The current building was reconstructed after being heavily damaged in a fire in December 1989.
