= W. Chamberlain & Co. =

Defunct American architectural firm

W. Chamberlain & Co., sometimes spelled W. Chamberlin was an architectural firm known for its design of courthouses. The firm is credited with Franklin County Courthouse (Georgia), Pulaski County Courthouse (Virginia), Crittenden County Courthouse and Jeff Davis County Courthouse (Georgia). The firm is named for Walter Chamberlain. The firm had offices in Knoxville, Tennessee and later in Birmingham, Alabama. It is also credited with the Holmes County Courthouse for Holmes County, Mississippi and Scotland County Courthouse in Memphis, Missouri. He also designed the Mason County Courthouse at Oglethorpe, Georgia (1894) and Berrien County Courthouse at Nashville, Georgia (1898)
