= Walker County Courthouse =

Historic courthouse in the US state of Georgia

- U.S. National Register of Historic Places
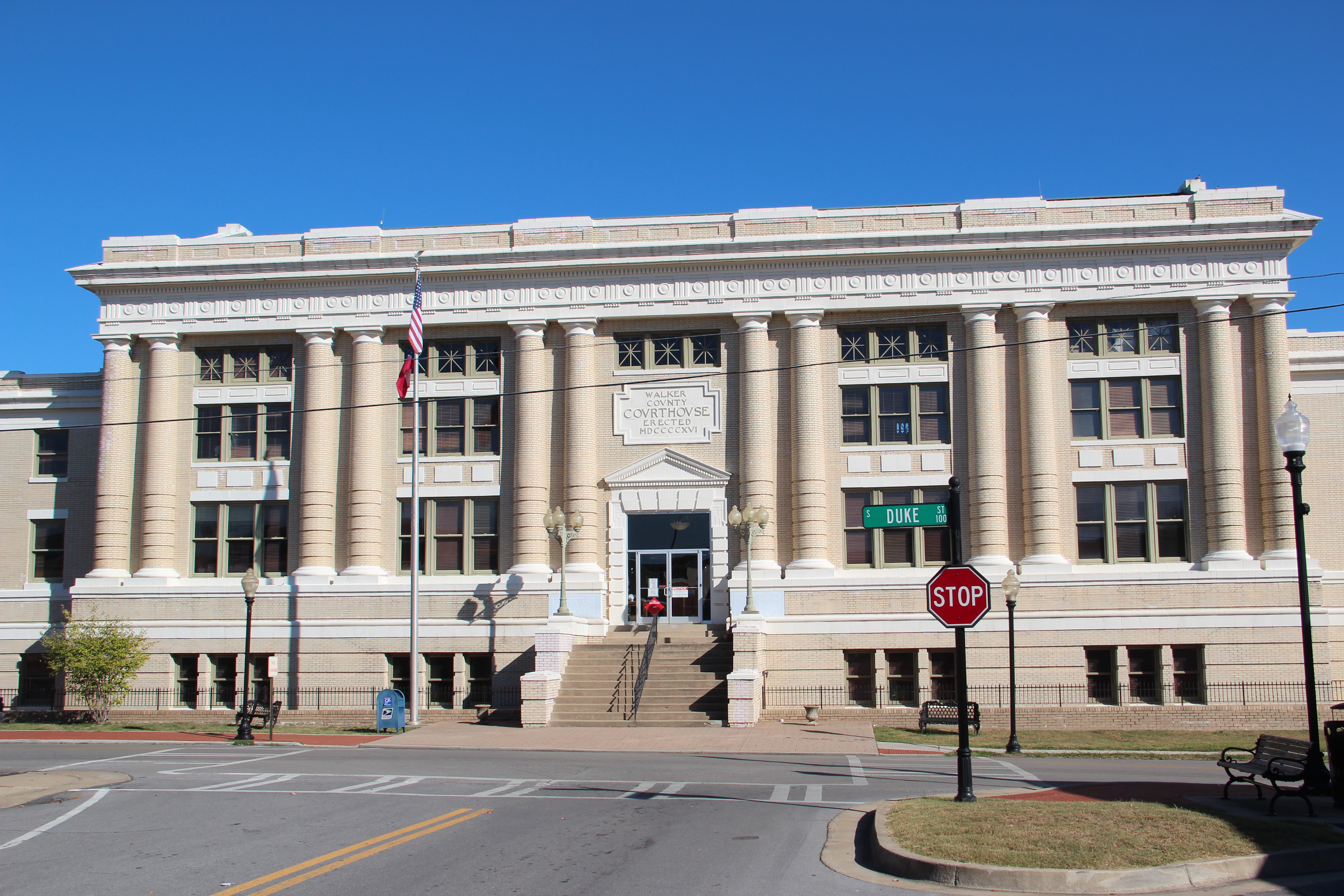

- Location within Georgia Location within the United States
- Interactive map showing the location of Walker County Courthouse
- Location: Duke St., LaFayette, Georgia
- Coordinates: 34°42′15″N 85°16′50″W
- Area: 1 acre (0.40 ha)
- Built: 1917
- Built by: Little, Cleckler Co.
- Architect: Charles E. Bearden
- Architectural style: Beaux Arts, Renaissance Revival
- MPS: Georgia County Courthouses TR
- NRHP reference No.: 80001254
- Added to NRHP: September 18, 1980

The Walker County Courthouse in LaFayette, Georgia was built in 1917 and is listed on the National Register of Historic Places.

It was designed with Beaux-Arts architecture by architect Charles E. Bearden. It is a three-story, rectangular courthouse built of cream brick. It has multiple pairs of "colossal" Tuscan order columns running up the second and third stories, alternating with triple windows. Its entablature has triglyphs and metopes. It is described in its National Register nomination as having a Beaux Arts/Renaissance Revival design: "It is not a pure design but is adapted and is Renaissance Revival more in massing and long horizontal lines rather than specific details."

Its interior features oak millwork that is especially noteworthy. Its courtroom is "unusually spacious; the woodwork, the deeply recessed ceiling squares, the retention of early light fixtures blend to create a sophisticated statement."

It was listed on the National Register in 1980.

Bearden, an architect based in Chattanooga, Tennessee, also designed the NRHP-listed Richard Hardy Memorial School in South Pittsburg, Tennessee.
