= Greene County Courthouse (Georgia) =

- U.S. National Register of Historic Places
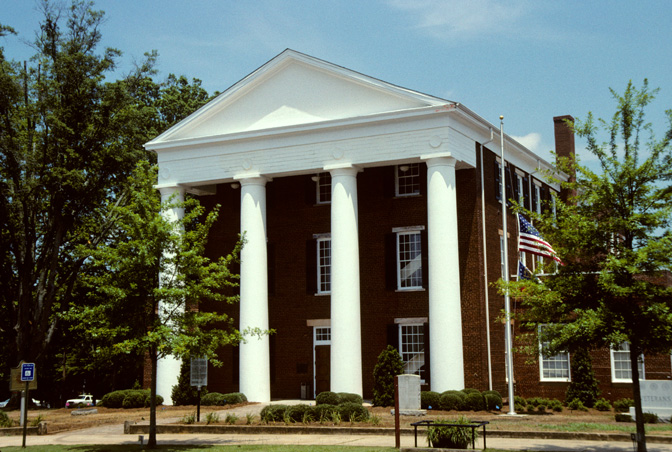

- Location within Georgia Location within the United States
- Interactive map showing the location of Greene County Courthouse
- Location: Georgia Route 12, Greensboro, Georgia
- Coordinates: 33°34′36″N 83°10′56″W
- Area: 2 acres (0.81 ha)
- Built: 1848-49, 1938
- Built by: Atkinson, Atharates; Demarest, David
- Architectural style: Greek Revival
- MPS: Georgia County Courthouses TR
- NRHP reference No.: 80001083
- Added to NRHP: September 18, 1980

The Greene County Courthouse in Greensboro in Greene County, Georgia was built in 1849. It was listed on the National Register of Historic Places in 1980.

It is a three-story Greek Revival-style brick courthouse built in 1848–49, and expanded in 1938 with two wings. Its third story was added by and for the local Masonic organization. It is located on Georgia Route 12.

The listing included three contributing buildings.

David Demarest was a master carpenter and practical architect. He also built the Old Spalding County Courthouse in Griffin, Georgia.
