= Franklin County Courthouse (Georgia) =

- U.S. National Register of Historic Places
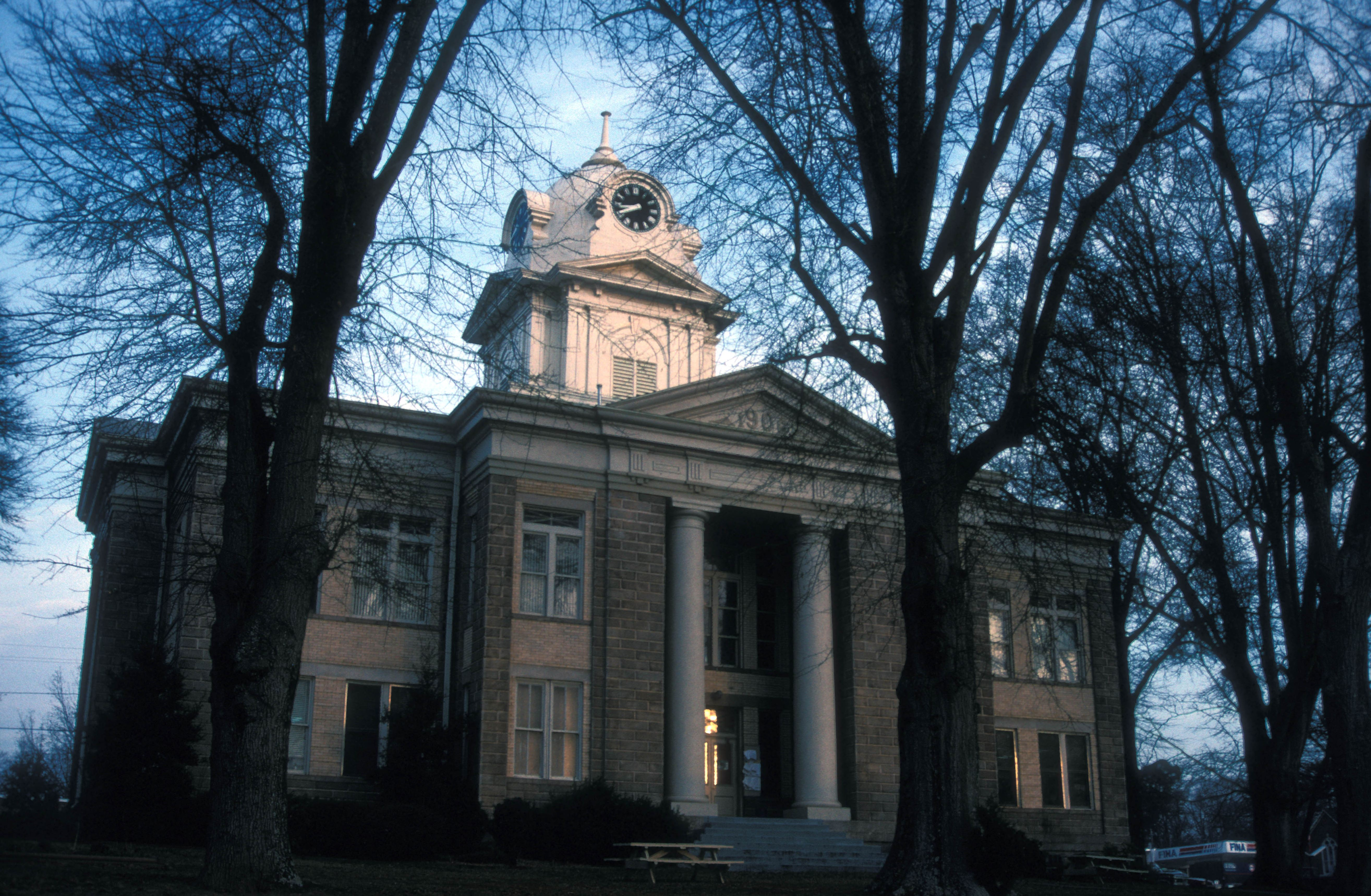
- 2006

- Location within Georgia Location within the United States
- Location: Courthouse Sq., Carnesville, Georgia
- Coordinates: 34°22′12″N 83°14′06″W
- Area: 2 acres (0.81 ha)
- Built: 1906
- Architect: Walter Chamberlain
- Architectural style: Neoclassical
- MPS: Georgia County Courthouses TR
- NRHP reference No.: 80001069
- Added to NRHP: September 18, 1980

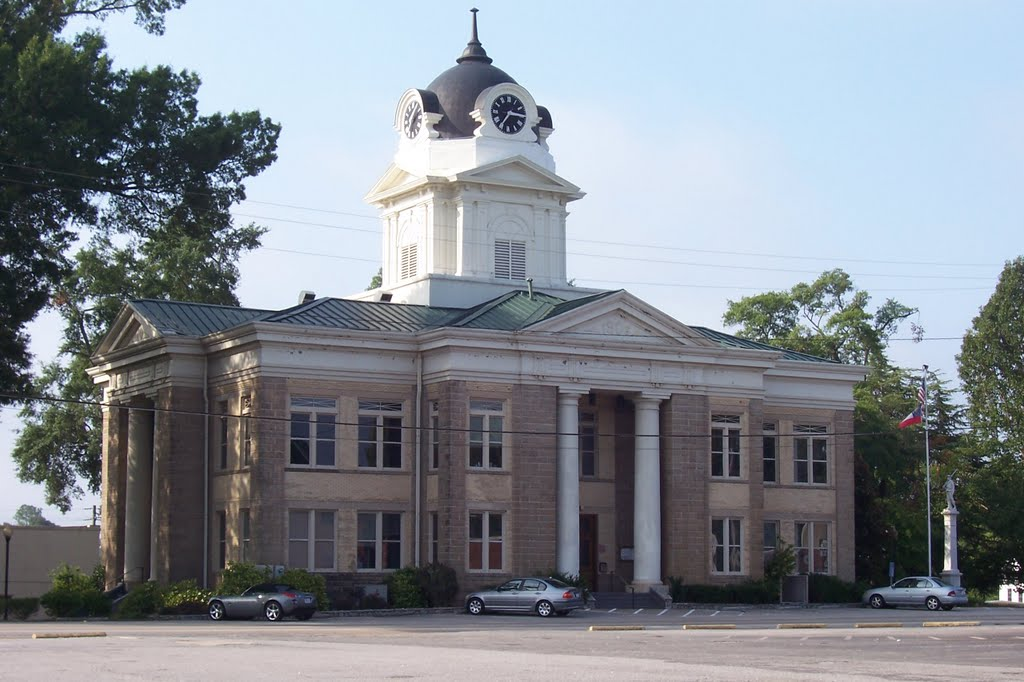
Franklin County Courthouse - December 2012

Franklin County Courthouse is a historic county courthouse in Carnesville, Georgia, county seat of Franklin County, Georgia. It was designed in a Neoclassical architecture style by Walter Chamberlain and constructed in 1906. It was added to the National Register of Historic Places on September 18, 1980. It is located in Courthouse Square.

== See also ==
- National Register of Historic Places listings in Franklin County, Georgia
