= Spalding County Courthouse =

- Spalding County Courthouse-Spalding County Jail
- U.S. National Register of Historic Places
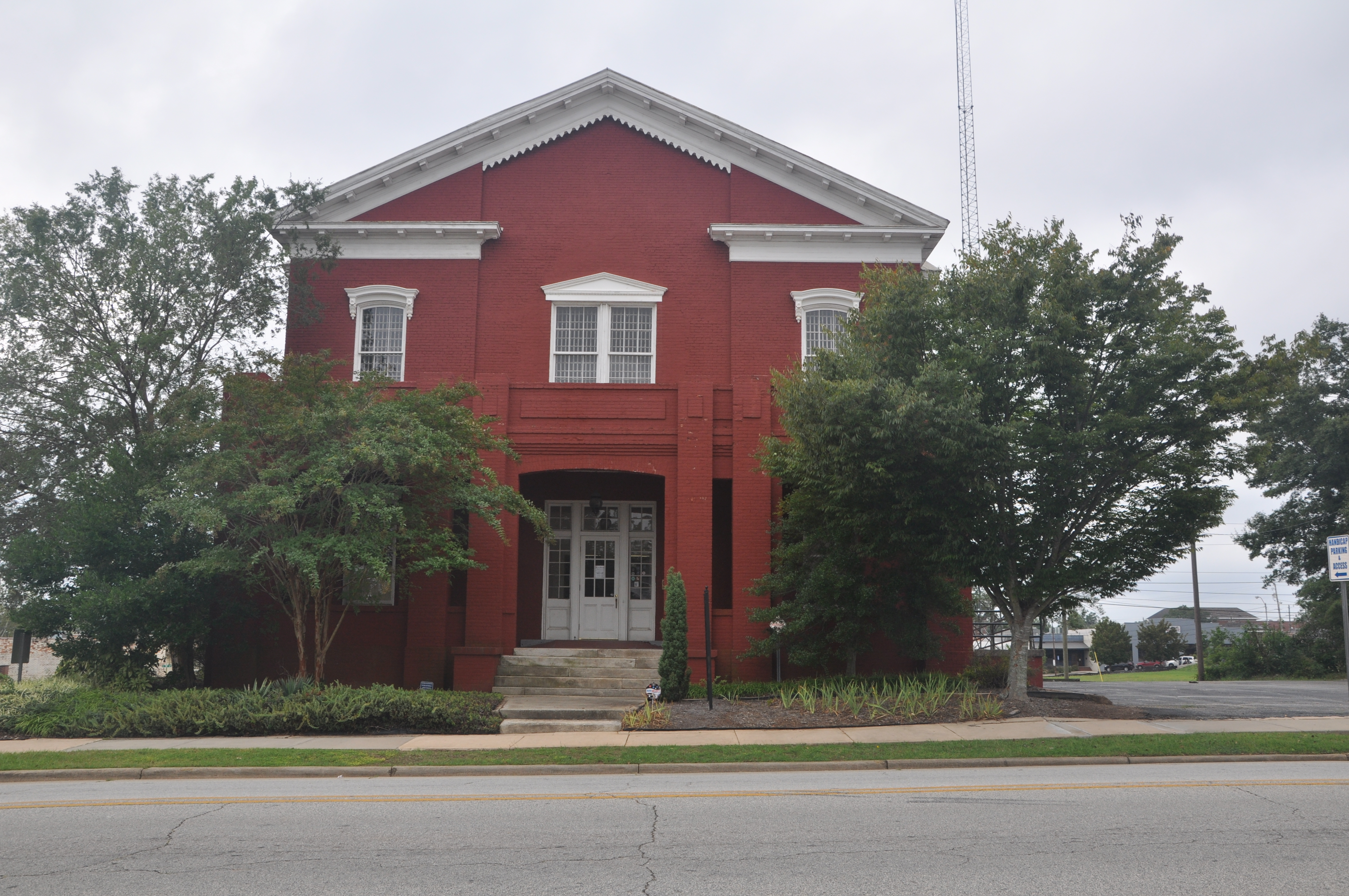

- Location within Georgia Location within the United States
- Location: 232 E. Broad St., Griffin, Georgia
- Coordinates: 33°14′59″N 84°15′38″W
- Area: less than one acre
- Built: 1859
- Built by: David Demarest
- Architect: Columbus Hughes
- Architectural style: Italianate
- NRHP reference No.: 00001389
- Added to NRHP: November 22, 2000

Spalding County Courthouse has been the name of successive courthouses of Spalding County, Georgia in Griffin, Georgia.

== Old Spalding County Courthouse ==
The first county courthouse, now also known as Old Spalding County Courthouse, was built in 1859. It was also used as the Spalding County Jail, and was listed on the National Register of Historic Places in 2000. The building's address is 232 East Broad Street. It is a two-story painted-brick building. It was built by David Demarest (1811-1879), who also built the NRHP-listed Greene County Courthouse in Greensboro, Georgia.

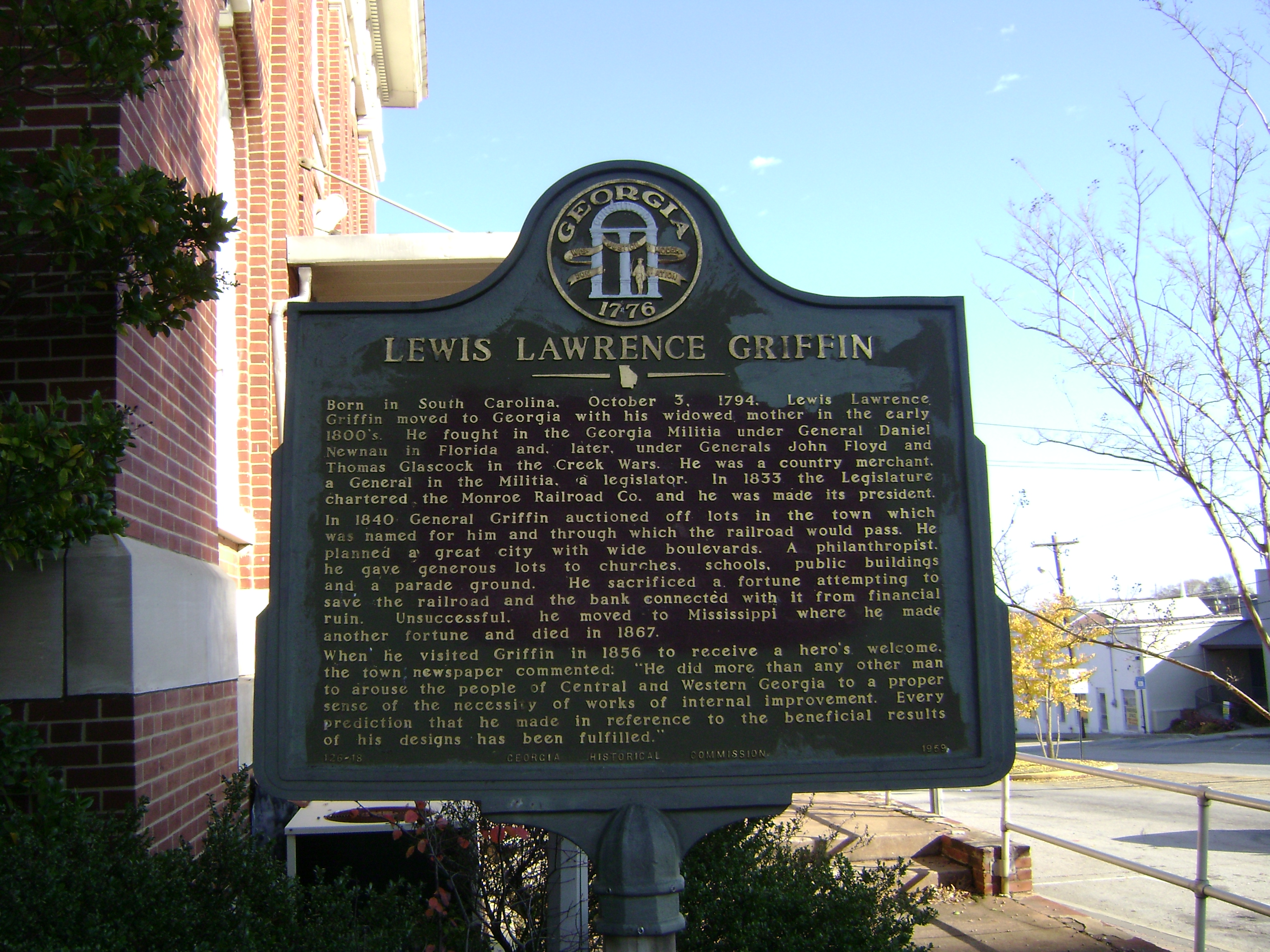
Lewis Lawrence Griffin Historical Marker

The building is on the corner of 5th Street and Broad Street. Constructed in 1859 for $12,000, it was located by the railroad tracks. Its steeple and clock tower were removed in 1910 and it was converted into a jail. It now houses the Spalding County Extension Service and 4H Offices.

== Second county courthouse ==
The second building to serve as the Spalding County Courthouse was at the corner of 6th and Solomon. It was designed by A. Ten Eyck Brown and completed in 1911. It was destroyed by fire on January 12, 1981. A shopping center was used as a temporary court and county office building until the new courthouse was built in 1982.

== New courthouse ==
The new courthouse was completed in 1985 by Baulding & Spandro.

== See also ==
National Register of Historic Places listings in Spalding County, Georgia
