= Old Bartow County Courthouse =

Historic courthouse in the US state of Georgia

- U.S. National Register of Historic Places
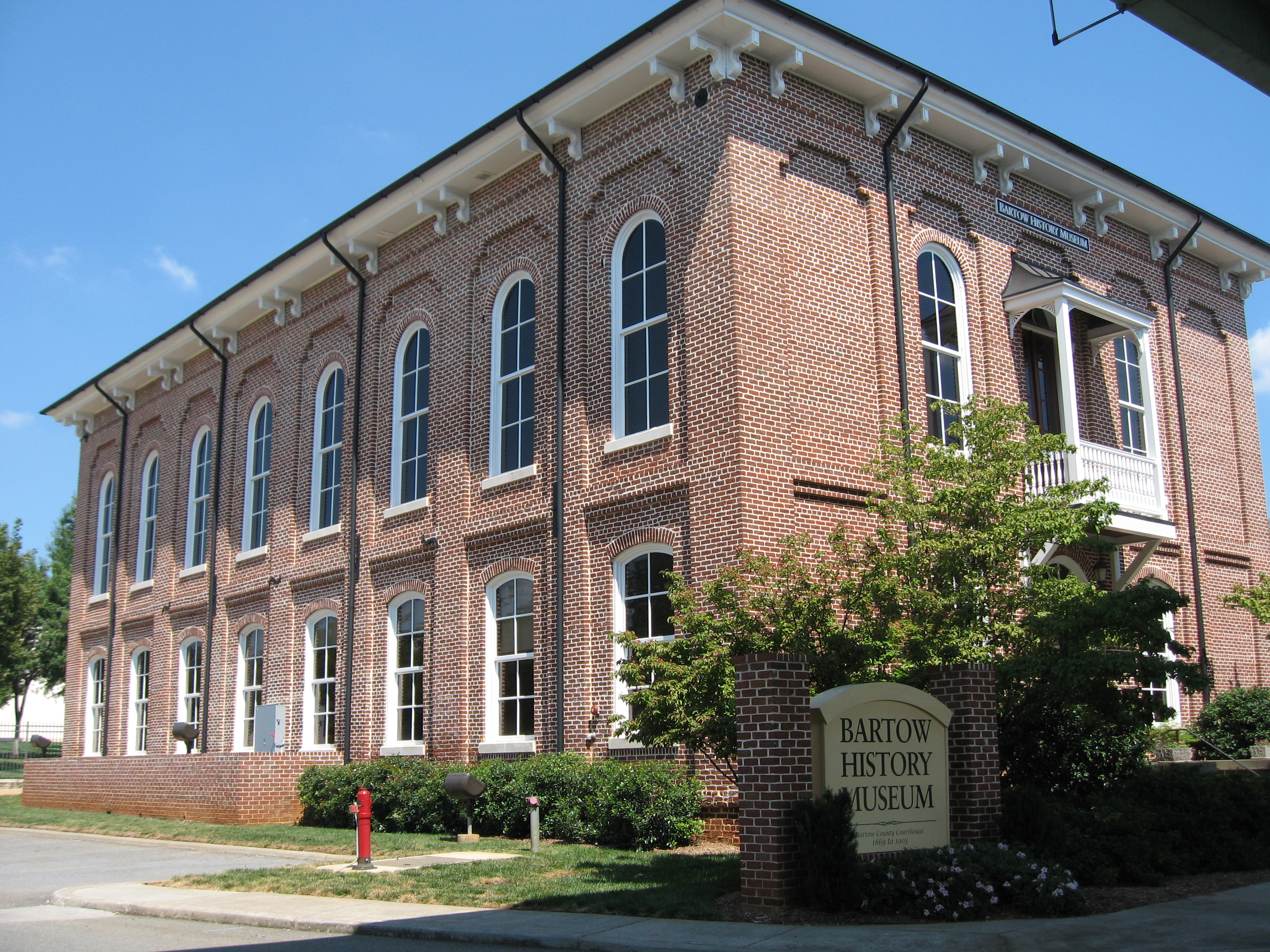

- Location within Georgia Location within the United States
- Interactive map showing the location of Old Bartow County Courthouse
- Location: 4 E. Church St., Cartersville, Georgia
- Coordinates: 34°10′1″N 84°47′46″W
- Area: less than one acre
- Built: 1869
- Architectural style: Italianate
- MPS: Georgia County Courthouses TR
- NRHP reference No.: 80000972
- Added to NRHP: September 18, 1980

The Old Bartow County Courthouse built in 1869 is an historic stately redbrick Italianate style building located at 4 East Church Street in Cartersville, Bartow County, Georgia, United States. Built as Bartow County's second courthouse and the first in Cartersville, it proved to be unsatisfactory because court proceedings had to be halted while trains passed by on the nearby railroad. It was replaced in 1902 by the third Bartow County Courthouse located nearby. The building was then either vacant or used as a warehouse until December 2010 when it became the Bartow History Museum.
