= Peach County Courthouse =

Historic building in Georgia, U.S.

- U.S. National Register of Historic Places
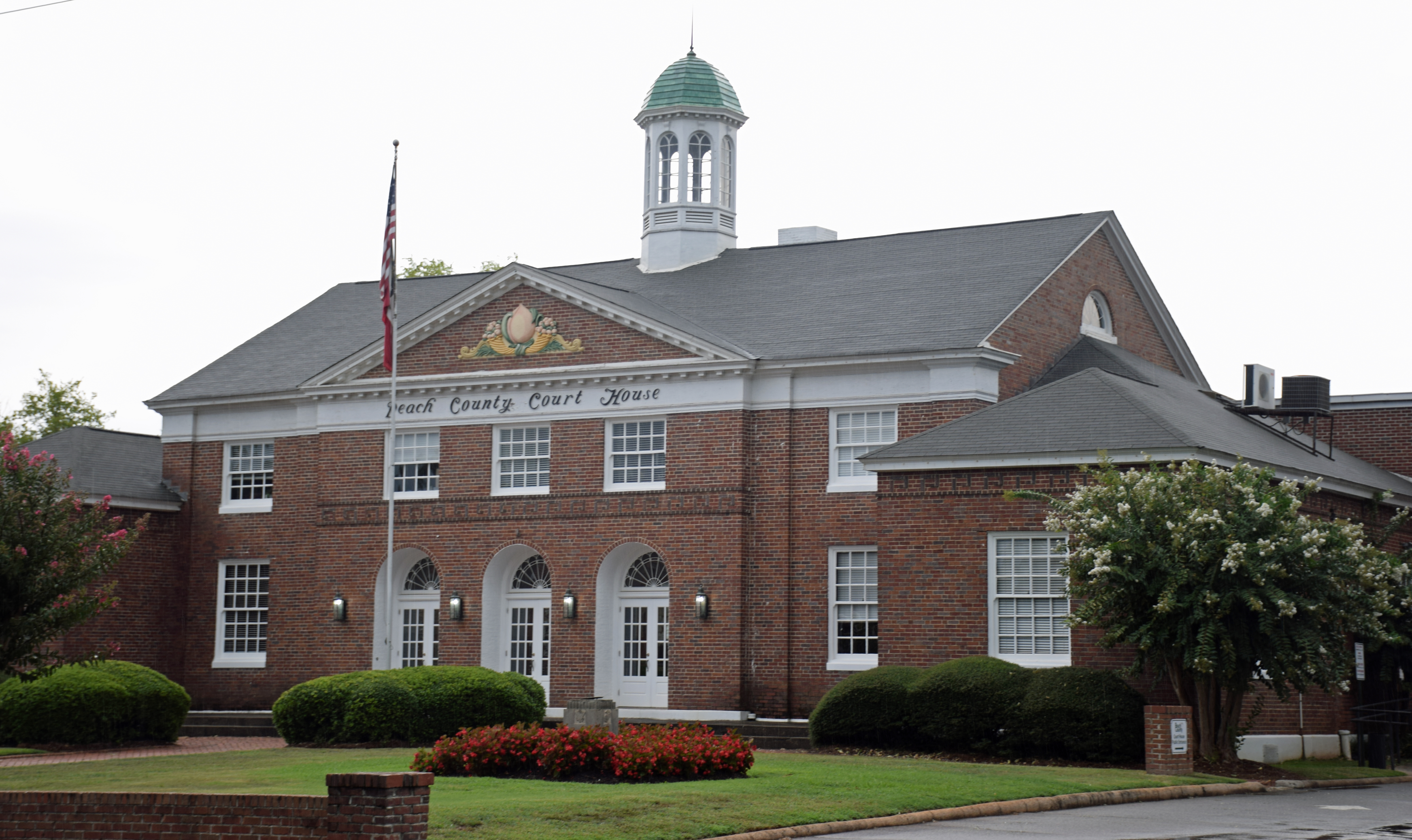
- The courthouse in 2015

- Location within Georgia Location within the United States
- Interactive map showing the location of Peach County Courthouse
- Location: Off GA 49, Fort Valley, Georgia
- Coordinates: 32.55333°N 83.88807°W
- Area: 2 acres (0.81 ha)
- Built: 1936
- Architectural style: Colonial Revival, Williamsburg revival
- MPS: Georgia County Courthouses TR
- NRHP reference No.: 80001219
- Added to NRHP: September 18, 1980

The Peach County Courthouse is located in Fort Valley, Georgia. It was built in 1936. It is of the Colonial Revival (or more specifically Williamsburg Revival style), and is one of only a few Colonial Revival-style courthouses in Georgia. It is the first courthouse built in Peach County, which is the newest county formed in the state, in 1924.

It has a two-story gable-roofed central section with a pedimented bay. It has a T-shaped addition added in 1972, making the interior into an H-pattern.

It was added to the National Register of Historic Places in 1980.
