= Irwin County Courthouse =

- U.S. National Register of Historic Places
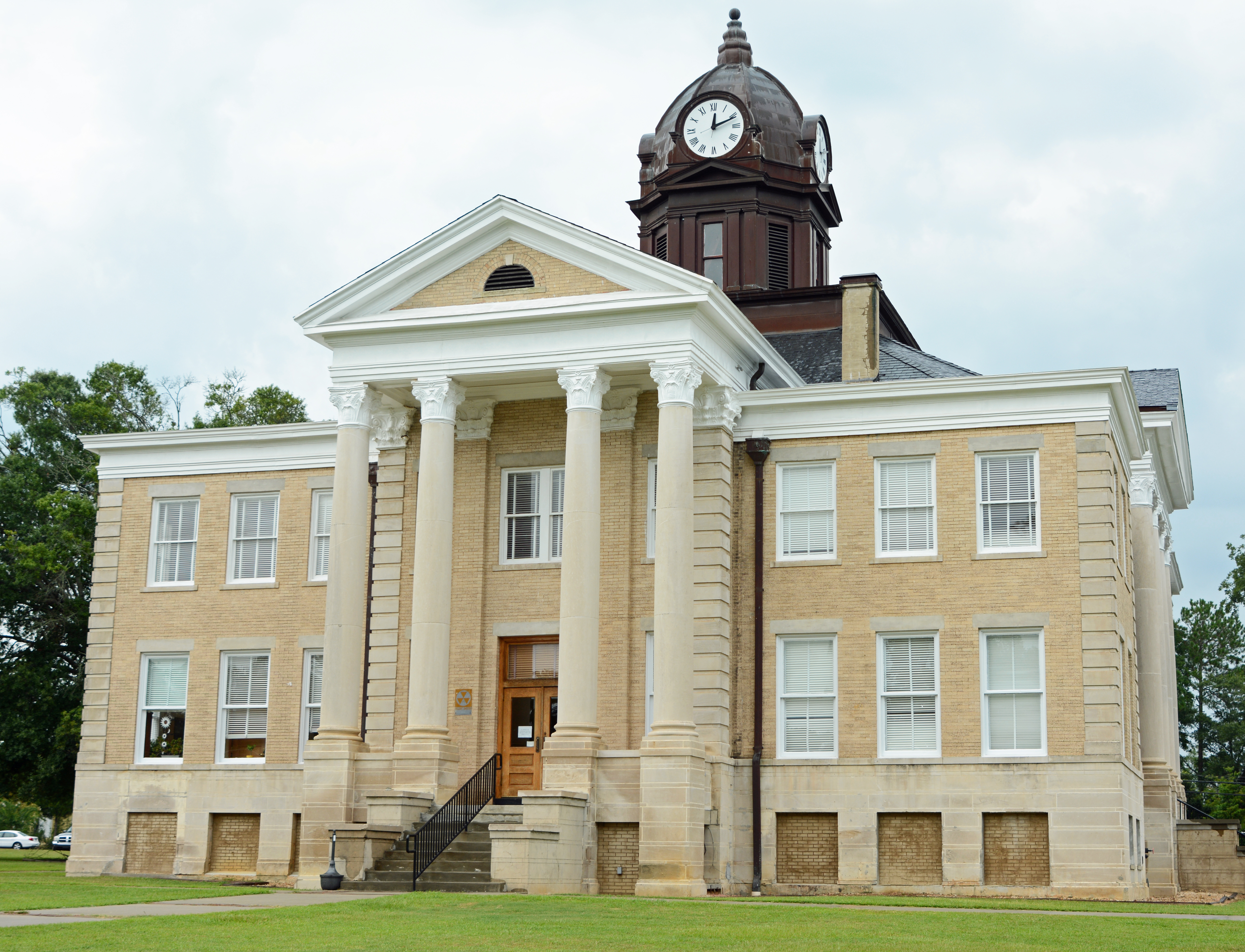

- Location within Georgia Location within the United States
- Interactive map showing the location of Irwin County Courthouse
- Location: 2nd St., Ocilla, Georgia
- Coordinates: 31.59175°N 83.25117°W
- Area: 4 acres (1.6 ha)
- Built: 1910
- Built by: Fall City Construction Co.
- Architectural style: Classical Revival
- MPS: Georgia County Courthouses TR
- NRHP reference No.: 80001095
- Added to NRHP: September 18, 1980

The Irwin County Courthouse is located in Ocilla, Georgia. It was made out of blond brick in the Neoclassical style at a cost of $52,000. It has a domed clock tower with four hooded clocks. Additions have been made to the rear side. Some interior walls are marble and painted plaster. Floors are made of wood, tile, carpet, and marble.

It was added to the National Register of Historic Places in 1980.
