= Old Chattahoochee County Courthouse =

- U.S. National Register of Historic Places
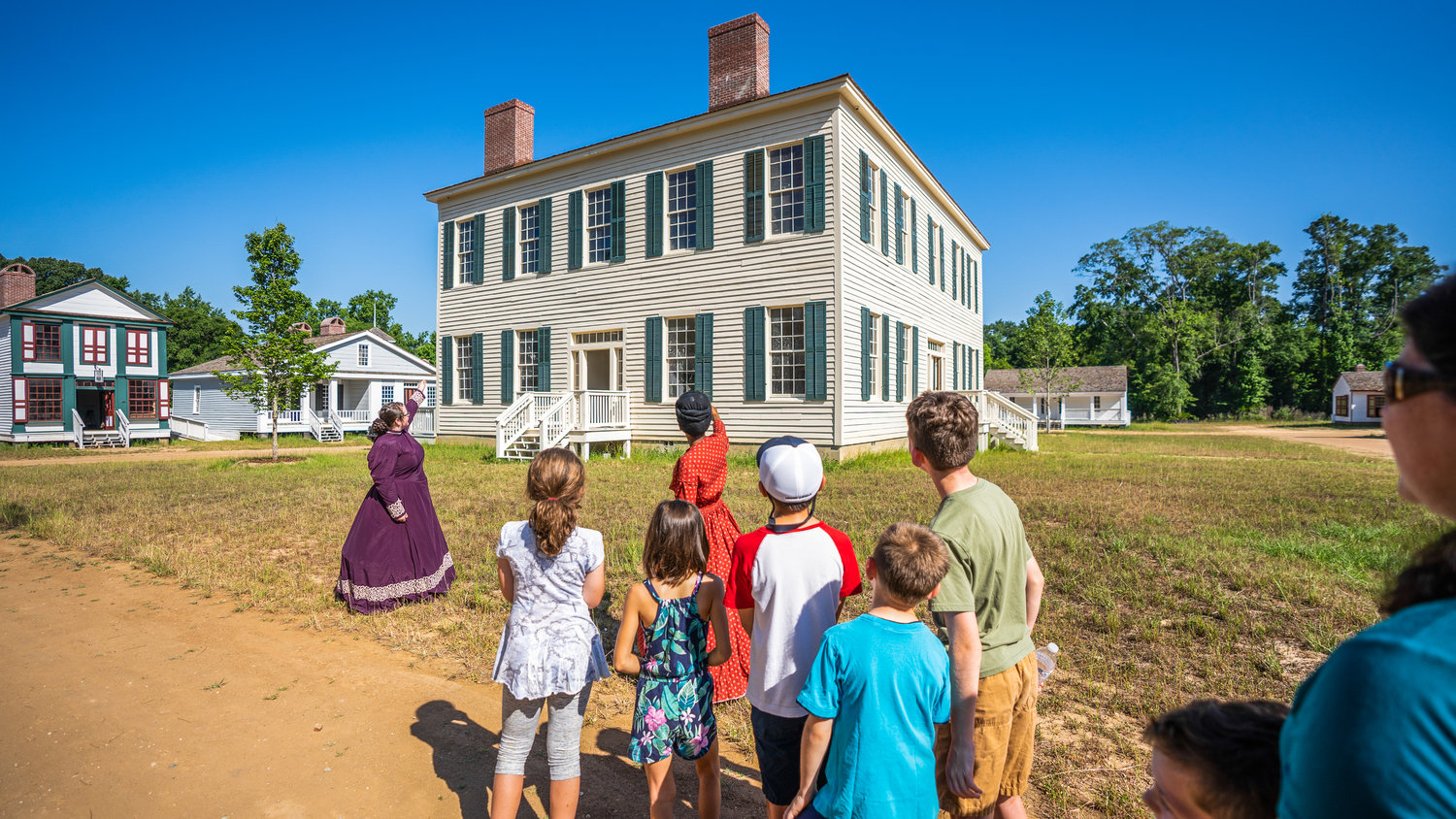
- Old Chattahoochee County Courthouse in the Historic Westville museum

- Location within Georgia Location within the United States
- Location: 3557 South Lumpkin Rd., Columbus, Georgia
- Coordinates: 32.3839°N 84.9585°W
- Area: less than one acre
- Built: 1854
- Architectural style: Carpenter style
- MPS: Georgia County Courthouses TR
- NRHP reference No.: 80001233
- Added to NRHP: September 18, 1980

The Old Chattahoochee County Courthouse was built in Cusseta, Georgia, in newly created Chattahoochee County in 1854. After being decommissioned and slated for demolition, it was relocated to Westville in Lumpkin, Georgia, an open-air museum representing west Georgia life around 1850. The Lumpkin location of Westville closed in July 2016, and in 2019, the museum was moved to Columbus, Georgia, near the Columbus Public Library.

It is a wood building, 50 by 60 feet (15 m × 18 m) in size, with four rooms downstairs. It is one of two remaining wooden courthouses in Georgia, the other being Old Marion County Courthouse. The building was added to the National Register of Historic Places in 1980.

== See also ==
- National Register of Historic Places listings in Stewart County, Georgia
