= Dooly County Courthouse =

- U.S. National Register of Historic Places
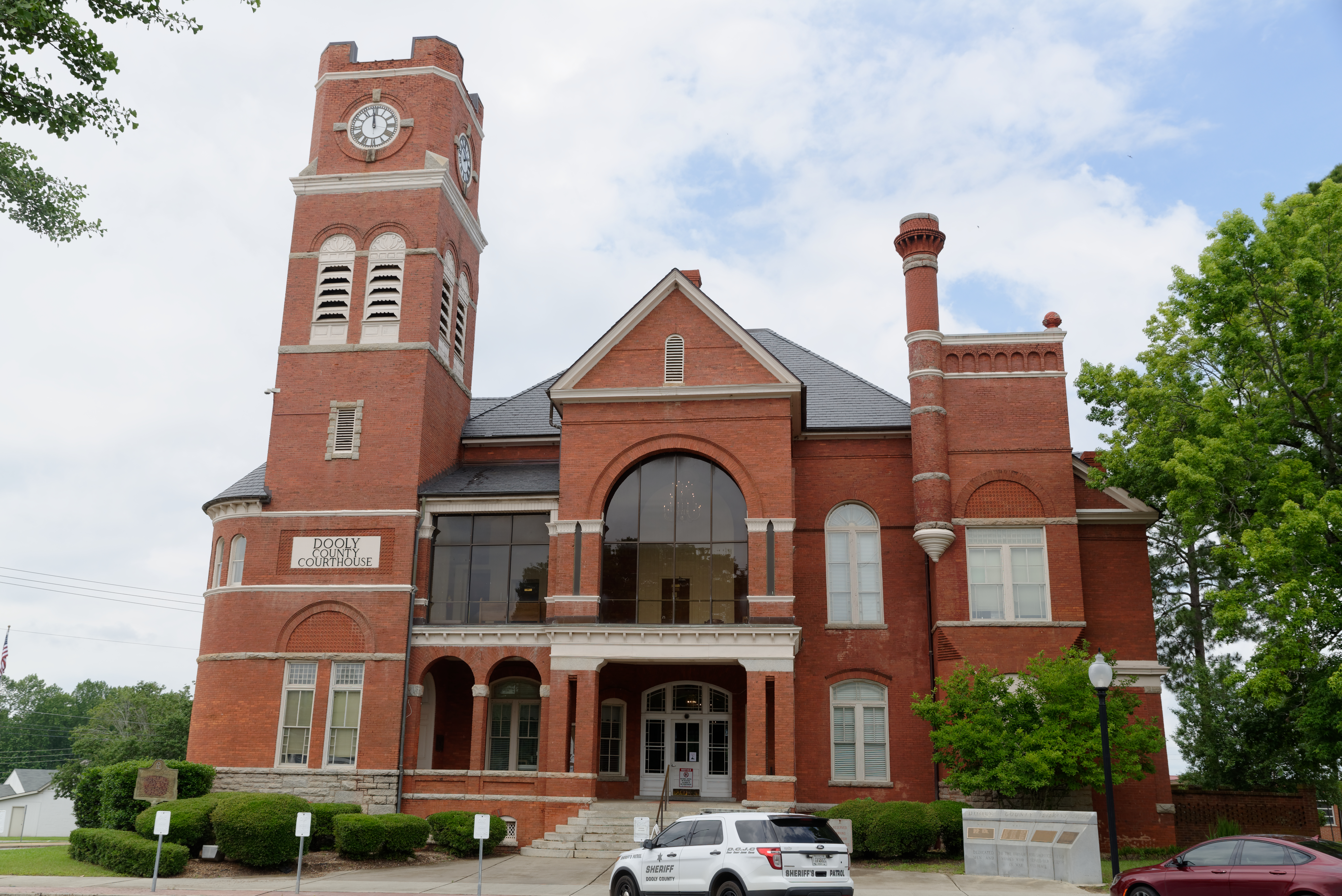

- Location within Georgia Location within the United States
- Location: GA 27, Vienna, Georgia
- Coordinates: 32°5′27″N 83°47′51″W
- Area: 2.5 acres (1.0 ha)
- Built: 1890
- Architect: Parkins, W.H.; Heard, J.P.
- Architectural style: Romanesque
- MPS: Georgia County Courthouses TR
- NRHP reference No.: 80001013
- Added to NRHP: September 18, 1980

The Dooly County Courthouse in Vienna, Georgia is a building from 1890. It was listed on the National Register of Historic Places in 1980.

This courthouse is the fourth courthouse to serve Dooly County.
