= Columbia County Courthouse (Georgia) =

- U.S. National Register of Historic Places
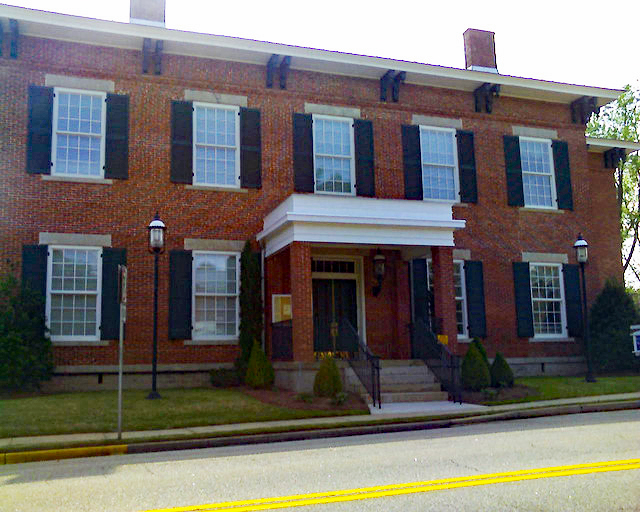

- Location within Georgia Location within the United States
- Location: GA 47, Appling, Georgia
- Coordinates: 33.546569°N 82.316447°W
- Area: less than one acre
- Built: 1812
- Built by: Trowbridge, John
- Architectural style: Italianate, Carpenter
- MPS: Georgia County Courthouses TR
- NRHP reference No.: 80001005
- Added to NRHP: September 18, 1980

The Columbia County Courthouse in Appling, Georgia is a building from 1812 with extensive additions made to the structure in 1856. It was listed on the National Register of Historic Places in 1980.

It is a two-story building with Italianate brackets at its eaves. John Trowbridge is identified as its architect/builder.

As of 1980, the courthouse's condition was identified as "good", it was in use by the county, and there had been plans by the county government to restore the building.
