= Old White County Courthouse =

Historic courthouse in Georgia, US

- U.S. National Register of Historic Places
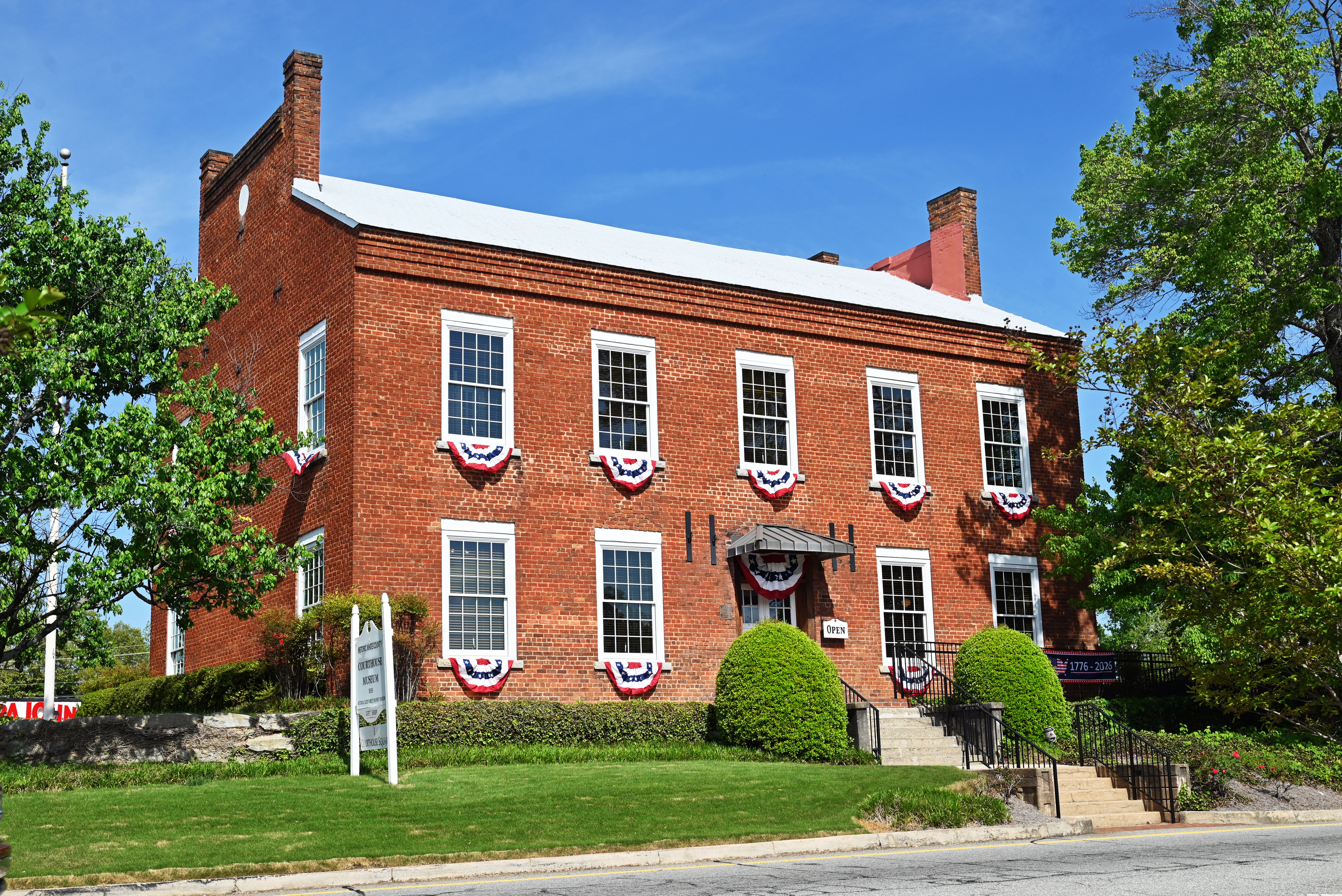
- The Old White County Courthouse

- Location within Georgia Location within the United States
- Location: On GA 115, Cleveland, Georgia
- Coordinates: 34.5971°N 83.76326°W
- Area: less than one acre
- Built: 1859
- Architect: Edwin Pore Williams and William Houston
- Architectural style: Georgian Colonial
- NRHP reference No.: 70000226
- Added to NRHP: October 28, 1970

The Old White County Courthouse is a historic county courthouse building in Cleveland, Georgia, and home to the White County Historical Society. It was built in 1859. It was added to the National Register of Historic Places on October 28, 1970. It is on Georgia State Route 115, and flanked by the northbound and southbound lanes of US 129 between SR 115 as well as East Jarrard Street to the north. The building was used for White County government business until 1962 when a modernist courthouse was built south of the square on South Main Street.

== See also ==
- National Register of Historic Places listings in White County, Georgia
