= Dawson County Courthouse (Georgia) =

Historic courthouse in Georgia, US

- U.S. National Register of Historic Places
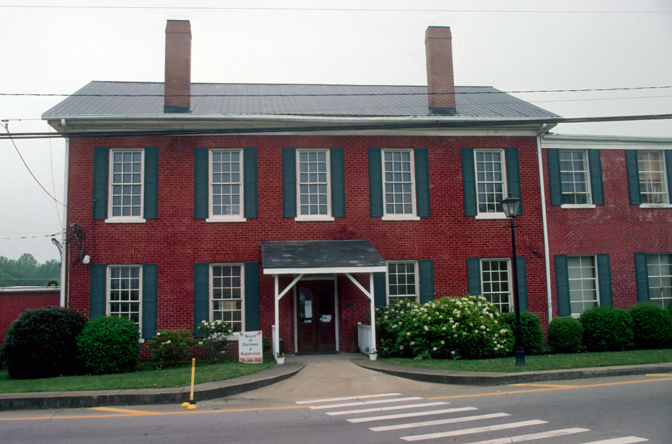
- Dawson County Courthouse

- Location within Georgia Location within the United States
- Location: Courthouse Sq., Dawsonville, Georgia
- Coordinates: 34°25′16″N 84°7′8″W
- Built: 1858, 1958
- Built by: Wesley McGuire, Henderson Wilson, and John Hackenhull
- Architectural style: Carpenter
- MPS: Georgia County Courthouses TR
- NRHP reference No.: 80001010
- Added to NRHP: September 18, 1980

The Dawson County Courthouse, built in 1858, is a historic two-story redbrick courthouse building located on Courthouse Square in Dawsonville, Georgia. It was built as a simple 50 feet (15 m) by 36 feet (11 m) brick building in 1858. An addition was added in 1958.

It was listed on the National Register of Historic Places in 1980.

It was renovated in 1989/90.

The building is not the current courthouse, which is located several blocks north.
