= Jeff Davis County Courthouse (Georgia) =

- U.S. National Register of Historic Places
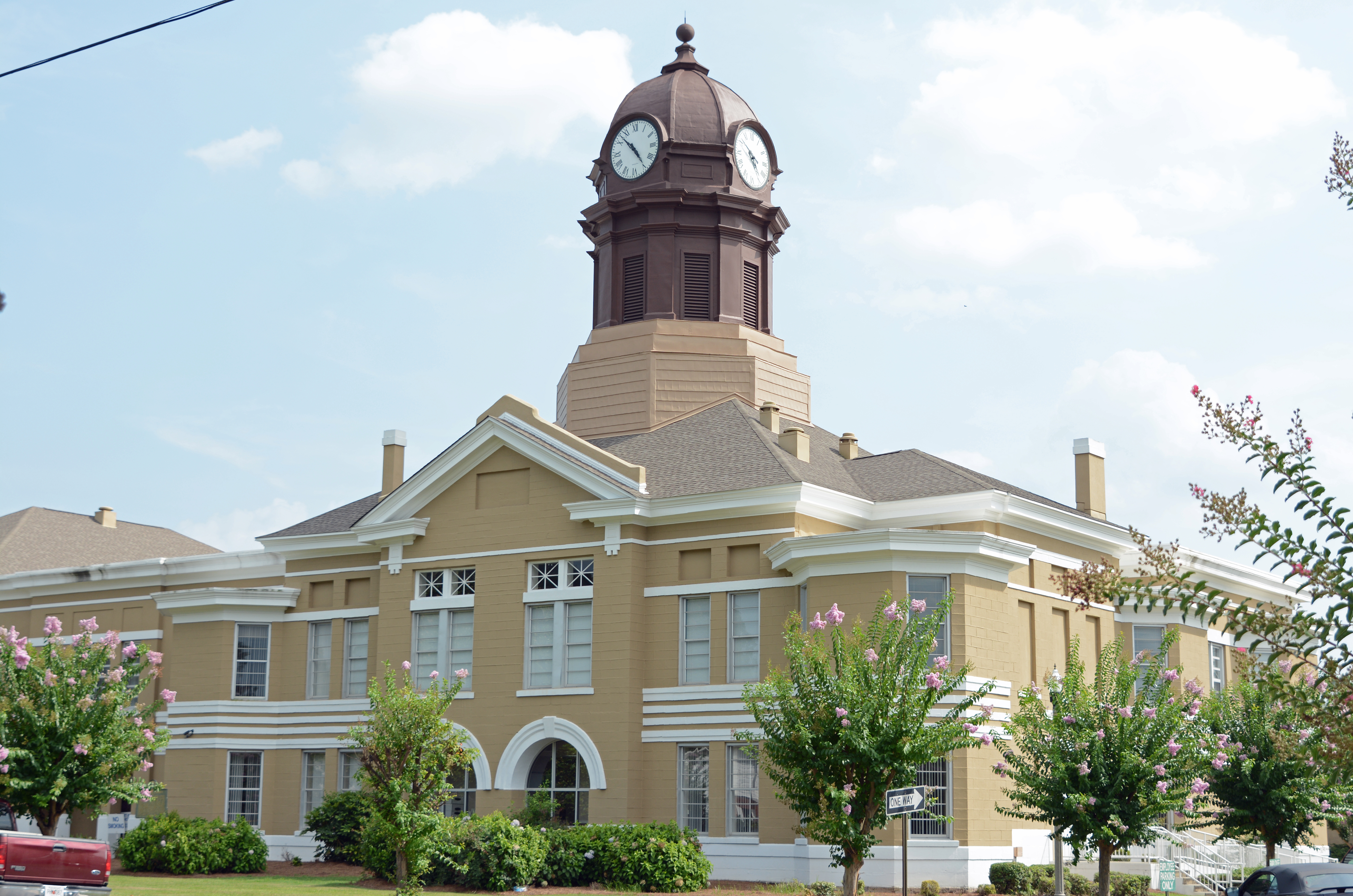
- Main entrance of the original part

- Location within Georgia Location within the United States
- Location: Courthouse Sq., Hazlehurst, Georgia
- Coordinates: 31°51′45″N 82°36′3″W
- Built: 1906
- Built by: M.T. Lewman & Co.
- Architect: Chamberlin, W.,& Co.
- Architectural style: Classical Revival
- MPS: Georgia County Courthouses TR
- NRHP reference No.: 80001098
- Added to NRHP: September 18, 1980

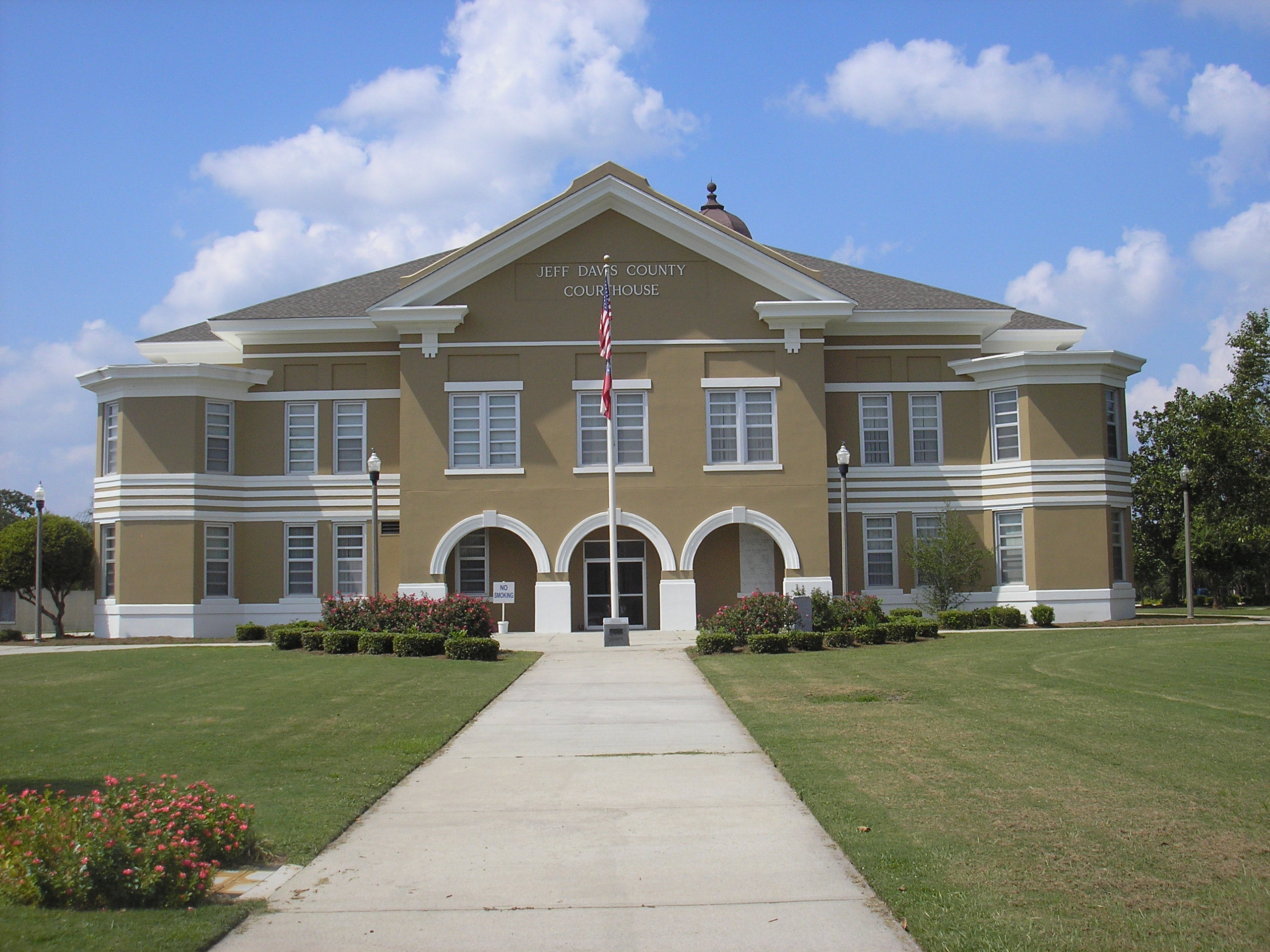
Modern entrance

Jeff Davis County Courthouse in Hazlehurst, Georgia was constructed in 1906. W. Chamberlain & Co. designed the building. Renovations were completed in 1975 and 1995. The latest renovations were designed by Brittain, Thompson, Bray, Brown, Inc.

Designed in the Neoclassical Revival style, the building is the county's first courthouse. A domed clock tower rises above the structure. The dome is "rather Eastern in feeling". Windows of the dome were enclosed in renovations before 1980. The footprint of the building is unusual: it has octagonal pavilions at each corner of a rectangular design.

It was listed on the National Register of Historic Places in 1980.
