= Henry L. Reaves =

American politician

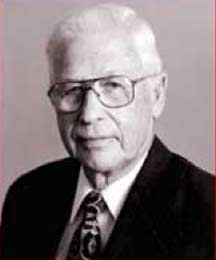

Member of the Georgia House of Representatives
- In office January 14, 1963 – January 8, 2001
- Preceded by: John E. Sheffield Jr.
- Succeeded by: C. Ellis Black
- Constituency: Brooks County (1963–1966); 99th district (1966–1969); 71st district (1969–1973); 124th district (1973–1975); 147th district (1975–1993); 178th district (1993–2001)

Personal details
- Born: Henry Lee Reaves; August 7, 1919 Kissimmee, Florida, U.S.
- Died: April 2, 2007 (aged 87) Quitman, Georgia, U.S.
- Party: Democratic
- Profession: Farmer, cattleman

Military service
- Allegiance: United States of America
- Branch/service: United States Army Air Forces
- Rank: First lieutenant

Henry Lee Reaves (August 7, 1919 – April 2, 2007) was an American farmer, cattleman, and politician. He was a member of the Georgia House of Representatives from 1963 to 2001.

== Early life ==
Reaves was born August 7, 1919, in Kissimmee, Florida to Coy and Blanche Nance Reaves, a pioneer Osceola County family. The family was engaged in open range cattle ranching, a practice common in the area in the years prior to World War II. (Note: "Cow hunting" on the open range with Coy Reaves in the years prior to World War II.) The Reaves property was a 300-acre (120 ha) spread, big enough that the nearest neighbors, on either side, were miles away. It was, however, small compared to the nearby Bronson Ranch which extended to 100,000 acres (40,000 ha) at one time. Young Reaves worked alongside land baron Irlo Bronson in the cattle business, adopting the common rancher custom of wearing a stetson, which he continued to do the rest of his life. (Note: Includes a photo of Henry Reaves with Irlo Bronson, Charles "Shang" Bronson, and others in working attire with horses and stetsons. The party appears to be wearing brogans instead of "cowboy boots".) (Note: Photo of Rep. Henry Reaves wearing trademark stetson commemorating the planting of the 50 millionth pine seedling.) Both Reaves and his younger brother Tom enlisted in the United States Army Air Forces during World War II. Henry served as a 1st Lieutenant, Tom as a captain. Upon joining the service, the cattle operations were maintained by the family, eventually passing to brother Tom. With the arrival of The Walt Disney Company in the 1960s, portions of the former cattle lands worked by the Reaves and Bronson families, including 8,380 acres (3,390 ha) owned by Irlo Bronson, became part of Disney World when the land was sold for little more than $100 an acre. Reaves Road in Kissimmee is located along portions of the old family homestead. After military service, Reaves worked as public affairs representative with Southern Railway and moved to Georgia, taking up farming and cattle ranching in Quitman.

== Political career ==
Reaves was elected to the Georgia House of Representatives in November 1962, and took office in January 1963. He served for the next 38 years, representing a district including Brooks County, his home of Quitman, and a southern portion of the state, bordering Florida. Representative Reaves was a member of the House Agriculture and Consumer Affairs committee for 34 years, serving as chairman for 22 years, until his retirement. He was a member of the Democratic party. Upon his death in April 2007, he was eulogized for standing up for issues critical to South Georgia farmers. He was also remembered as the principal proponent of legislation authorizing the Boll Weevil Eradication Program in Georgia, which reestablished cotton as a major cash crop in the state.

== Legacy ==
Brooks County, Georgia and city of Quitman

During his tenure in the Georgia General Assembly, Reaves received numerous recognitions for his work on behalf of the people and institutions dedicated to Georgia agriculture. He received Outstanding Service Awards from 4-H and the Future Farmers of America, the Friend of the Farmer Award in 1992 from the Georgia Farm Bureau Federation, awards for outstanding service from the University of Georgia College of Veterinary Medicine, as well as awards from the National Vocational Ag Teachers Association, and Georgia Pork Producers. Reaves was inducted into the Georgia Cattlemen's Association Hall of Fame in 1987, the Georgia Peanut Commission Hall of Fame, and the Georgia Agriculture Hall of Fame in 1998. For a period of 30 years, while serving in the Legislature, all state agricultural facilities built during that period were initiated or heavily influenced by Representative Reaves. The Reaves Arena, an 8,250-seat multi-purpose arena in Perry, Georgia is named in honor of Representative Reaves who, along with Representative Larry Walker, was instrumental in the creation of the Georgia National Fairgrounds and Agricenter, where the arena is located. The arena hosts local sporting events and concerts. It was opened in 1990.

== Death ==
Reaves died on April 2, 2007, at the age of 87.
