= Jack Connell (Georgia politician) =

American politician

Member of the Georgia House of Representatives
- In office January 13, 1969 – January 13, 2003
- Constituency: 79th district (1969–1973); 80th district (1973–1975); 87th district (1975–1993); 115th district (1993–2003)

Personal details
- Born: Atticus Jerome Connell Jr. September 10, 1919 Richmond County, Georgia, United States
- Died: February 6, 2013 (aged 93) Augusta, Georgia, United States
- Party: Democratic
- Spouse: Nanette Anderson (m. 1968)

Atticus Jerome "Jack" Connell Jr. (September 10, 1919 – February 6, 2013) was an American politician. He was a member of the Georgia House of Representatives from 1969 to 2002. He was a member of the Democratic party. He served as Speaker Pro Tempore of the House from 1977 until his retirement in 2002.

Georgia House of Representatives
Preceded by George Busbee; Colquitt Hurst Odom; R. S. Dick Hutchinson; William Spencer Lee	Member of the Georgia House of Representatives from the 79th district, Post 2; 1969–1973	Succeeded by Bernard F. Miles
Preceded by Henry Roswell Smith; John H. Sherman, Jr	Member of the Georgia House of Representatives from the 80th district 1973–1975	Succeeded by Phillip Benson Ham
Preceded by Tom Buck; Harvey Norwood Pearce	Member of the Georgia House of Representatives from the 87th district 1975–1993	Succeeded by Tyrone Carrell
Preceded by Larry Walker	Member of the Georgia House of Representatives from the 115th district 1993–2003	Succeeded by Larry Walker
Preceded by Ward Edwards	Majority Whip of the Georgia House of Representatives; 1973–1977	Succeeded by Nathan Knight
Preceded by Al Burruss	Speaker pro tempore of the Georgia House of Representatives; 1977–2003	Succeeded by DuBose Porter
