= Reaves Arena =

Multi-purpose arena in Perry, Georgia

Coordinates: 32.437424°N 83.749187°W

The Reaves Arena is an 8,250-seat multi-purpose arena in Perry, Georgia, United States. It was opened in 1990, hosting local sporting events and concerts. The arena is named in honor of Representative Henry L. Reaves (D-Quitman) who, along with Representative Larry Walker, was instrumental in the creation of the Georgia National Fairgrounds and Agricenter, where the arena is located.
