= Larry Walker (politician) =

American attorney and politician (1942–2026)

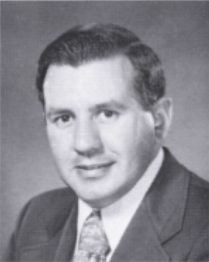

Member of the Georgia House of Representatives
- In office January 8, 1973 – January 10, 2005
- Preceded by: G. D. Adams
- Succeeded by: Jane Kidd
- Constituency: 100th district (1973–1975); 115th district (1975–1993); 141st district (1993–2003); 115th district (2003–2005)

Personal details
- Born: Lawrence Cohen Walker Jr. March 9, 1942 Perry, Georgia, U.S.
- Died: June 9, 2026 (aged 84) Perry, Georgia, U.S.
- Party: Democratic
- Spouse: Janice Knighton
- Children: 4, including Larry III
- Education: University of Georgia (BBA, JD)

Lawrence Cohen Walker Jr. (March 9, 1942 – June 9, 2026) was an American attorney and politician who served in the Georgia House of Representatives from 1973 to 2005, as a member of the Democratic Party. He was the majority leader of the state house from 1987 to 2002.

== Early life and education ==
Lawrence Cohen Walker Jr. was born in Perry, Georgia, on March 9, 1942, to Lawrence Cohen Walker Sr. and Hilda Gray Walker. He graduated from Perry High School in 1960. He graduated from the University of Georgia with a Bachelor of Business Administration degree in 1963, and a Juris Doctor in 1964. He was president of Phi Delta Phi. and a member of the Board of Governors of the student bar association.

== Local politics ==
Walker started working at the law firm Walker and Richardson in 1965. Walker was appointed as a judge in the municipal court of Perry, in 1966. The city council appointed Walker as city attorney on April 4, 1972, while George Nunn was selected to replace him as judge. He was reappointed as city attorney in 1974, and 1976.

Walker became a member of the Middle Georgia Area Planning and Development Commission (MGAPDC) on January 1, 1973. He served as vice chair until becoming acting chair when Ed Bond was replaced on the board in 1974. On March 7, 1974, he was appointed as chair of the MGAPDC. Al Williams was elected to succeed Walker as chair on December 12.

== State legislature ==
In the 1972 election Walker ran for a seat in the Georgia House of Representatives from the 100th district. He defeated Kevin Sumner for the Democratic nomination and faced no opposition in the general election. He faced no opposition in the 1974 and 1976 elections. Walker was a member of the state house from 1973 to 2005.

Walker ran to succeed Al Burruss as speaker pro tempore, the second-highest position in the state house, in 1976, but lost to Jack Connell.

From 1987 to 2002, Walker was Majority Leader. During his tenure in the state house he was a member of the Appropriations, Judiciary, and Rules committees. He was vice-chair of the Judiciary committee during the 1975 session.

== Later life ==
Walker was a member of the Georgia Department of Transportation from Georgia's 8th congressional district from 2007 to 2009. Governor Sonny Perdue appointed Walker as an at-large member of the Georgia Board of Regents in August 2009.

Walker wrote columns for The Telegraph from 2001 to 2017. Middle Georgia State University awarded an honorary degree to Walker in 2026.

== Personal life ==
Walker was a member of the United Methodist Church. He married Janice Knighton, with whom he had four children including Larry Walker III, in 1964. Walker died in Perry on June 9, 2026.

== Political positions ==
All five members of the Houston County Board of Education were from Warner Robins, Georgia, which Walker felt was not representative. Walker considered proposing legislation to have the board of education be elected, but did not propose it as he wanted to study the issue more and later stated in 1974 that he lacked support among Houston County's state legislative delegation. Neil Holloman resigned from the board in 1973, and Walker called for somebody from Perry to be appointed, but L. A. McConnell of Warner Robins was selected.

Walker voted against raising the salary of government officials in 1973. He voted in favor of an amendment to the 1976 Appropriations Act which would increase the salary of Georgia State Patrol officers.

The state house and Walker voted against ratifying the Equal Rights Amendment in 1974.

In 1976, Walker voted against allowing the Governor of Georgia to serve more than on term.

Funding for Middle Georgia Technical College's (MGTC) campus in Warner Robins was supported by Walker. This campus was completed in 1997. The Central Georgia Technical College, which succeeded MGTC, named a multi-purpose building in Walker's honor in 2014.

Walker voted against legislation in 1976 to lower the penalty for possessing an ounce or less of marijuana from a year in prison and/or a $1,000 fine to a fine less than $100 for a first time offense and six months in prison and/or a $300 fine for repeat offenders.

=== Taxation ===
Perry had an ad valorem tax exemption for people who owned properties greater than five acres in size. Attorney General Arthur K. Bolton stated in an unofficial opinion that this was unconstitutional and discriminated against smaller property owners. In 1973, Walker proposed legislation to remove this exemption.

In 1973, Walker voted in favor of legislation that allowed cities and counties to impose a 1% local income tax. He voted in favor of allowing counties to institute a local sales tax in 1974. Legislation that would allowed cities and counties to institute either an income or sales tax was supported by Walker in 1975.

=== Recreation ===
Natural Resources Commissioner Joe Tanner planned on closing 17 state parks and historical sites on August 15, 1975, in order to save money. One of these sites was White Water Creek Park, which Walker fought against the closing of.

Development of the Georgia National Fairgrounds and Agricenter was pushed by Walker in the 1980s. The GNFA started work on the Larry Walker Arena & Barn in May 2025, and it is expected to be completed by April 2027.

== Works cited ==
=== News ===
- "Area Voting On Pay Bill". The Telegraph. February 24, 1973. p. A1 – via Newspapers.com.
- "County Seat Amendment Transfer Asked by Watson". The Telegraph. March 19, 1975. p. 7B – via Newspapers.com.
- "Dr. Bell Is Elected Perry's Mayor Pro Tem". The Telegraph. January 10, 1966. p. 9 – via Newspapers.com.
- "House Gives Local Option Tax Boost". The Macon News. February 16, 1974. p. 6B – via Newspapers.com.
- "L. C. Walker Joins Law Firm". The Macon News. June 19, 1965. p. 8 – via Newspapers.com.
- "Larry Walker Hired by Perry as City Attorney". The Atlanta Constitution. April 9, 1972. p. 7C – via Newspapers.com.
- "Larry Walker Jr. (1942 - 2026)". The Telegraph. June 12, 2026.
- "Larry Walker receives ABA Lifetime Achievement award". Houston Home Journal. May 10, 2014. Archived from the original on June 11, 2026.
- "Local Income Tax Bill Killed In House Vote". The Macon News. March 13, 1973. p. B1 – via Newspapers.com.
- "Moyer, Carter Get Primary Opposition". The Macon News. June 13, 1974. p. 1A – via Newspapers.com.
- "Murphy keeps Speaker's post". The Gainesville Times. November 11, 1976. p. 4B – via Newspapers.com.
- "Perry Property Tax Challenged". The Telegraph. January 16, 1973. p. 3A – via Newspapers.com.
- "Perry Selects Two Officials". The Macon News. April 6, 1972. p. 12B – via Newspapers.com.
- "Planners Elect Chairman". The Macon News. December 13, 1974. p. B1 – via Newspapers.com.
- "Planners To Meet Thursday". The Macon News. March 4, 1974. p. 1B – via Newspapers.com.
- "Seats in General Assembly decided in Tuesday vote". Ledger-Enquirer. August 6, 1972. p. A15 – via Newspapers.com.
- "Ten Are Unopposed in Houston County". The Macon News. August 11, 1976. p. 6A – via Newspapers.com.
- "Walker Says School Plan Needs Study". The Macon News. February 16, 1973. p. B1 – via Newspapers.com.
- "Walker Shelves Elections Plan". The Macon News. January 9, 1974. p. B1 – via Newspapers.com.
- "Woman Elected Mayor Pro Tem". The Telegraph. January 7, 1976. p. 2A – via Newspapers.com.
- Ackerman, Jan (March 20, 1975). "Decision Delayed On Suit Appeals". The Telegraph. p. 7B – via Newspapers.com.
- Bonner, Christopher (July 9, 1973). "Robins Man Gets School Board Post". The Macon News. p. 1A – via Newspapers.com.
- Harris, Richard (January 3, 1974). "Anti-Drug Leaks Probed in Perry". The Telegraph. p. 9A – via Newspapers.com.
- Lewis, Myracle (June 10, 2026). "'Respected' state representative who helped develop Perry fairgrounds dies at 84". The Telegraph. Archived from the original on June 11, 2026.
- McCash, Selby (January 20, 1976). "House Okays 2-Term Bill". The Telegraph. p. 1A – via Newspapers.com.
- McCash, Selby (January 29, 1974). "Middle Georgia Lawmakers 3-1 Against ERA". The Telegraph. p. 1A – via Newspapers.com.
- McCash, Selby (March 4, 1975). "Sales Tax Bill Two Votes Shy". The Telegraph. p. 1A – via Newspapers.com.
- Palmer, Prentice (April 7, 1976). "Rep. Walker Makes House Pro Tem Bid". The Atlanta Journal. p. 0A – via Newspapers.com.
- Robinette, Eddie (August 10, 1972). "Rivals Agree on Houston Pay". The Macon News. p. 1A – via Newspapers.com.
- Sellers, Beryl (June 30, 1975). "11 Valley Legislators Oppose Pay Hikes". Ledger-Enquirer. p. B1 – via Newspapers.com.
- Sellers, Beryl (February 6, 1976). "House Kills Pot Penalty Reduction". Ledger-Enquirer. p. B1 – via Newspapers.com.
- Sellers, Beryl (July 26, 1975). "State Closing 17 Parks, Historic Sites". Ledger-Enquirer. p. A11 – via Newspapers.com.
- Thompson, Maxine (April 7, 1974). "Rep. Walker New Leader Of Planners". The Macon News. p. 1 – via Newspapers.com.
- Wilson, Linda (March 8, 1974). "Larry Walker Elected Head Of Planners". The Telegraph. p. 3A – via Newspapers.com.

=== Web ===
- "Representative Larry Walker (D-SH 115)". Georgia General Assembly. Archived from the original on December 29, 2004.
- "Statement from CGTC on the Passing of Former State Legislator Larry Walker Jr". Central Georgia Technical College. June 11, 2026. Archived from the original on June 16, 2026.

Georgia House of Representatives
Preceded by G. D. Adams	Member of the Georgia House of Representatives from the 100th district 1973–1975	Succeeded by Frank C. Pinkston
Preceded by Arthur B. C. Dorminy, Jr. Eugene Talmadge "Ted" Hudson; Howard H Rainey	Member of the Georgia House of Representatives from the 115th district 1975–1993	Succeeded by Jack Connell
Preceded by Kermit Bates	Member of the Georgia House of Representatives from the 141st district 1993–2003	Succeeded by Bobby Parham
Preceded by Jack Connell	Member of the Georgia House of Representatives from the 115th district 2003–2005	Succeeded by Jane V. Kidd
Preceded by Al Burruss	Majority Leader of the Georgia House of Representatives; 1986–2003	Succeeded by Jimmy Skipper
