= Party leaders of the Georgia House of Representatives =

The following are lists of party leaders of the Georgia House of Representatives. The positions of majority and minority leaders were established in the 1960s following the growth of minority caucuses in both houses.

== Majority leaders ==
- Tom Murphy (Democratic, 1967-1970)
- George Busbee (Democratic, 1971-1974)
- Clarence R. Vaughn Jr. (Democratic, 1974-1982)
- Al Burruss (Democratic, 1982-1986)
- Larry Walker (Democratic, 1986-2003)
- Jimmy Skipper (Democratic, 2003-2005)
- Jerry Keen (Republican, 2005-2011)
- Larry O'Neal (Republican, 2011-2015)
- Jon G. Burns (Republican, 2015-2023)
- Chuck Efstration (Republican, 2023-present)

== Governor's floor leaders ==
- Under Ernest Vandiver
  - Frank Twitty
- Under Carl Sanders
  - Tommy Irvin
  - George Busbee
- Under Joe Frank Harris
  - Calvin Smyre (assistant for 1983, senior for 1987)
  - George Hooks (assistant)
- Under Sonny Perdue
  - Glenn Richardson
  - Rich Golick (Senior)
- Under Zell Miller
  - DuBose Porter (1991-1992)
- Under Nathan Deal
  - Lynne Riley
  - Christian A. Coomer
- Under Brian Kemp
  - Jodi Lott (2019-2023)
  - Will Wade (2023-2024)
