= Dennis & Dennis =

American architectural partnership

Dennis & Dennis was an architectural partnership in the U.S. state of Georgia which was Georgia's oldest architectural firm. It designed numerous commercial, institutional and residential buildings in Macon and other Georgia communities.

== Early years ==
It was established by Peter E. Dennis (1854-1929) in 1884. Peter had attended the University of Georgia from 1871 to 1872 and had trained in the office of Algernon Blair in Macon, before leaving to create his own firm. The firm became "Dennis and Dennis" in 1912 when Peter's son John joined.

== Designs ==
Dennis and Dennis designed two houses in the Shirley Hills Historic District's original listed area. The boundary increase added 271 contributing buildings and 24 contributing sites.

A number of their works are listed on the National Register of Historic Places for their architecture.

== Works by either architect or attributed to the firm ==
- Turner County Courthouse (1907–08), Courthouse Sq., Ashburn, GA (Alexander Blair III and Peter E. Dennis), NRHP-listed
- Southeastern Holiness Institute (1914), 102 Hospital Circle, Donalsonville, GA (Dennis, Peter E.), NRHP-listed
- Leesburg High School (1922), 100 Starkville Ave., Leesburg, GA (Dennis and Dennis), NRHP-listed
- Municipal Auditorium (1925), 415-435 1st St., Macon, GA (Dennis & Dennis served as associate architects to Edgerton Swartwout of New York), NRHP-listed
- New Perry Hotel (1925), 800 Main St., Perry, GA (Dennis & Dennis), NRHP-listed
- Telfair County Courthouse (1934), Courthouse Sq., McRae, GA (Dennis & Dennis), NRHP-listed
- Emanuel County Courthouse (1940), Main St., Swainsboro, GA (Dennis and Dennis), NRHP-listed
- Dasher-Stevens House, 904 Orange Ter., Macon, GA (Dennis, Peter), NRHP-listed
- Riverside Cemetery, 1301 Riverside Dr., Macon, GA (Dennis, Peter E.), NRHP-listed
- West Point Public School, Jct. of Ave. F and E. 8th St., West Point, GA (Dennis and Dennis), NRHP-listed
- One or more works in Ashburn Heights-Hudson-College Avenue Historic District, Roughly bounded by McLendon, Phillips, Monnie, Hudson and College Aves., Ashburn, GA (Dennis, Peter E.), NRHP-listed
- One or more works in Everett Square Historic District, Roughly bounded by Knoxville, Vineville, Anderson, and Macon Sts. and the Central of Georgia RR tracks, Fort Valley, GA (Dennis & Dennis), NRHP-listed
- One or more works in Shingler Heights Historic District, N. Main St. (US 41) between Murray and Hill Aves., Ashburn, GA (Dennis, Peter E.), NRHP-listed
- At least two works in Shirley Hills Historic District, Macon, Georgia, NRHP-listed
