= Murray County Courthouse =

Murray County Courthouse may refer to:

- Murray County Courthouse (Georgia), Chatsworth, Georgia
- Murray County Courthouse (Oklahoma), Sulphur, Oklahoma
