= Ishmaelite =

Ishmaelite may refer to:

- Ishmaelites, descendants of Ishmael in the Bible, later identified with Arabs by Muslim scholars
- Ismaili, a follower of a branch of Shia Islam
- Sparta Ishmaelite, a newspaper in Sparta, Georgia, U.S.
