= Trib Publications =

Newspaper in Manchester, Georgia

- Industry: Mass media
- Founded: 1968
- Founder: Robert Tribble
- Headquarters: Georgia, U.S.

Trib Publications is a regional newspaper chain based in Manchester, Georgia, United States.

Trib Publications was started by Robert Tribble in 1968. Tribble, previously the editor of the local weekly newspaper Manchester Mercury, bought three small weeklies, the Harris County Journal, Meriwether Vindicator and Talbotton New Era with a total circulation of 3,500. In 1976 he bought his former paper, by then called the Manchester Star-Mercury. By 1984 he had 15 papers, which grew to 30 by 1995. Some of Trib's earliest Georgia acquisitions were sold in 1999 to another small paper aggregator, Millard B. Grimes of Athens, Georgia's Grimes Publications. Trib re-acquired these properties from Grimes in 2011.

Among Trib's other papers is The Western Star, a weekly in Bessemer, Alabama. The Star was established in 1984, but its predecessor titles go back to 1887 (Bessemer Advertiser 1949–1990, Tribune-Advertiser 1930–1949, Bessemer Advertiser 1920–1930, Bessemer Weekly 1889–1920, The Bessemer 1887–1889). As of 1995, its circulation was 9,500, at that time the largest circulation among Trib's papers; the circulation has since dropped to less than 3,000. The Star's offices in Charleston House are on the National Register of Historic Places as part of the Downtown Bessemer Historic District.

Trib Publications sold the Western Star to Bibb County Media, non-profit operators of a news website in nearby Centreville, in March 2022. Then in September 2024, the Birmingham Business Journal reported that the Star had been sold to John Allan Clark, who also publishes The Greensboro Watchman in Hale County and the Times-Standard-Herald in Perry County.

Trib has continued to acquire new properties, buying the Houston Home Journal of Perry, Georgia in 2014.

Among Trib Publications' properties are:

- The Centreville Press in Centreville, Alabama
- The Marion Times-Standard in Marion, Alabama
- The Adel News Tribune in Adel, Georgia
- The Berrien Press in Nashville, Georgia
- The Camilla Enterprise in Camilla, Georgia
- The Citizen-Georgian in Montezuma, Georgia
- The Fayette County News in Fayetteville, Georgia
- The Harris County Journal in Hamilton, Georgia
- The Hogansville Herald in Hogansville, Georgia
- The Houston Home Journal in Perry, Georgia
- The Lanier County News in Lakeland, Georgia
- The Leader Tribune in Fort Valley, Georgia
- The Manchester Star-Mercury in Manchester, Georgia
- The Meriwether Vindicator in Greenville, Georgia
- The News Observer in Vienna, Georgia
- The Plus in Sandersville, Georgia.
- The Quitman Free Press in Quitman, Georgia
- The Sandersville Progress in Sandersville, Georgia
- The Sparta Ishmaelite in Sparta, Georgia
- The Talbotton New Era in Talbotton, Georgia
- The Today in Peachtree City in Fayetteville, Georgia
- The Wiregrass Farmer in Ashburn, Georgia
- The Wrightsville Headlight in Wrightsville, Georgia
- The Polk County News Journal in Columbus, North Carolina
- The Yancey Common Times Journal in Burnsville, North Carolina
- The Advertizer-Herald in Bamberg, South Carolina
- The Holly Hill Observer in Holly Hill, South Carolina
- The Keowee Courier in Walhalla, South Carolina
- The Lake Community Buyer's Guide in Santee, South Carolina
- The Landrum News Leader in Landrum, South Carolina
- The Santee Striper in Santee, South Carolina
- The Westminster News in Westminster, South Carolina
