= Senator Lambert =

Senator Lambert may refer to:

- Benjamin Lambert (1937–2014), Virginia State Senate
- Eddie J. Lambert (fl. 2000s–present), Louisiana State Senate
- Ezekiel Roy Lambert (1925–2008), Georgia State Senate
- Gary Lambert (politician) (born 1959), New Hampshire State Senate
- John Lambert (politician) (1746–1823), U.S. Senator from New Jersey from 1809 to 1815
- Kent Lambert (fl. 1970s–2010s), Colorado State Senate
- Louis Lambert (politician) (1940–2025), Louisiana State Senate
- Paul Lambert (Nebraska politician) (born 1950), Nebraska State Senate

== See also ==
- Jeff Lamberti (born 1962), Iowa State Senate
