= Telfair County Courthouse and Jail =

- U.S. National Register of Historic Places
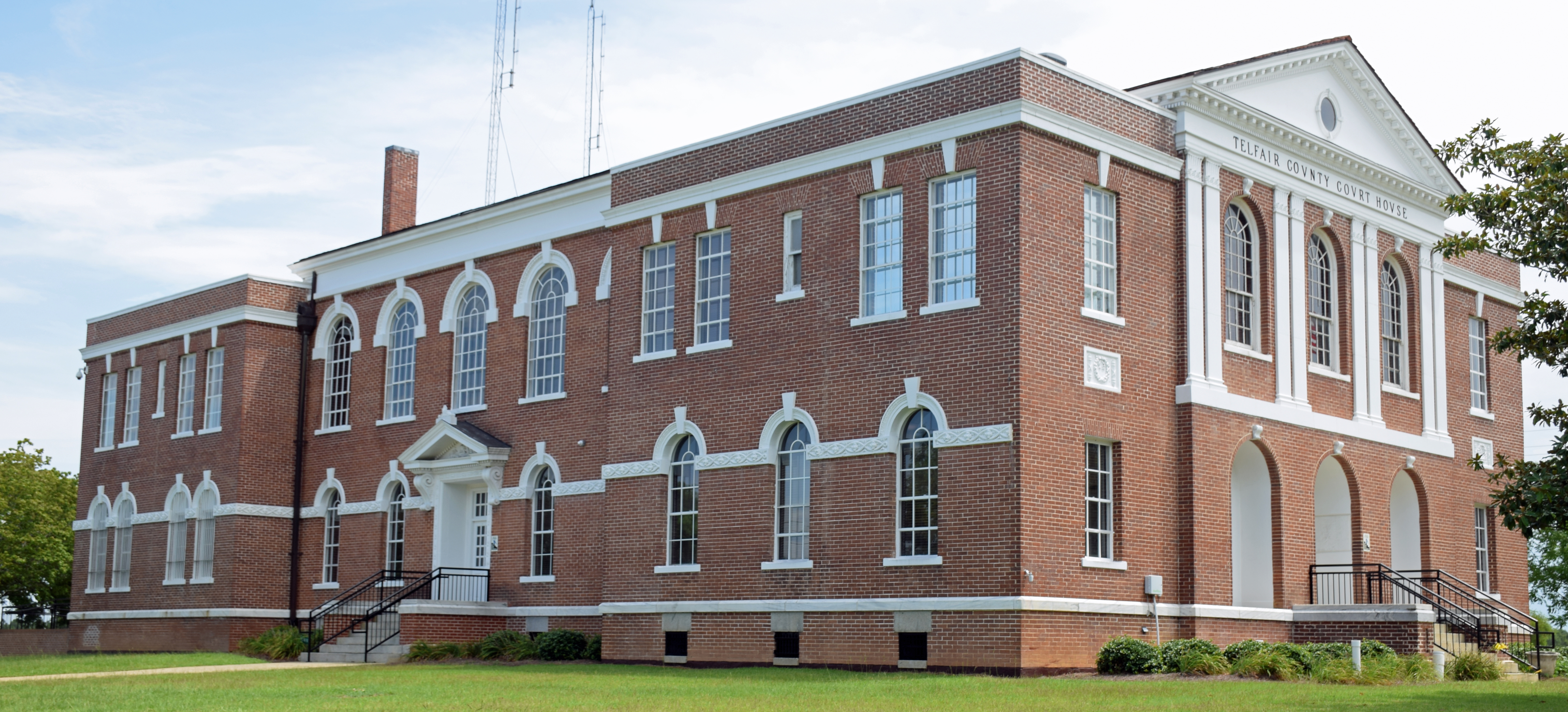
- Courthouse, the middle part is the original building

- Location within Georgia Location within the United States
- Interactive map showing the location of Telfair County Courthouse and Jail
- Location: Courthouse Sq., McRae-Helena, Georgia
- Coordinates: 32°4′1″N 82°53′48″W
- Area: 1.5 acres (0.61 ha)
- Built: 1902, 1934
- Built by: A. E. Aittner
- Architect: Dennis & Dennis
- Architectural style: Colonial Revival
- MPS: Georgia County Courthouses TR
- NRHP reference No.: 95000720
- Added to NRHP: June 8, 1995

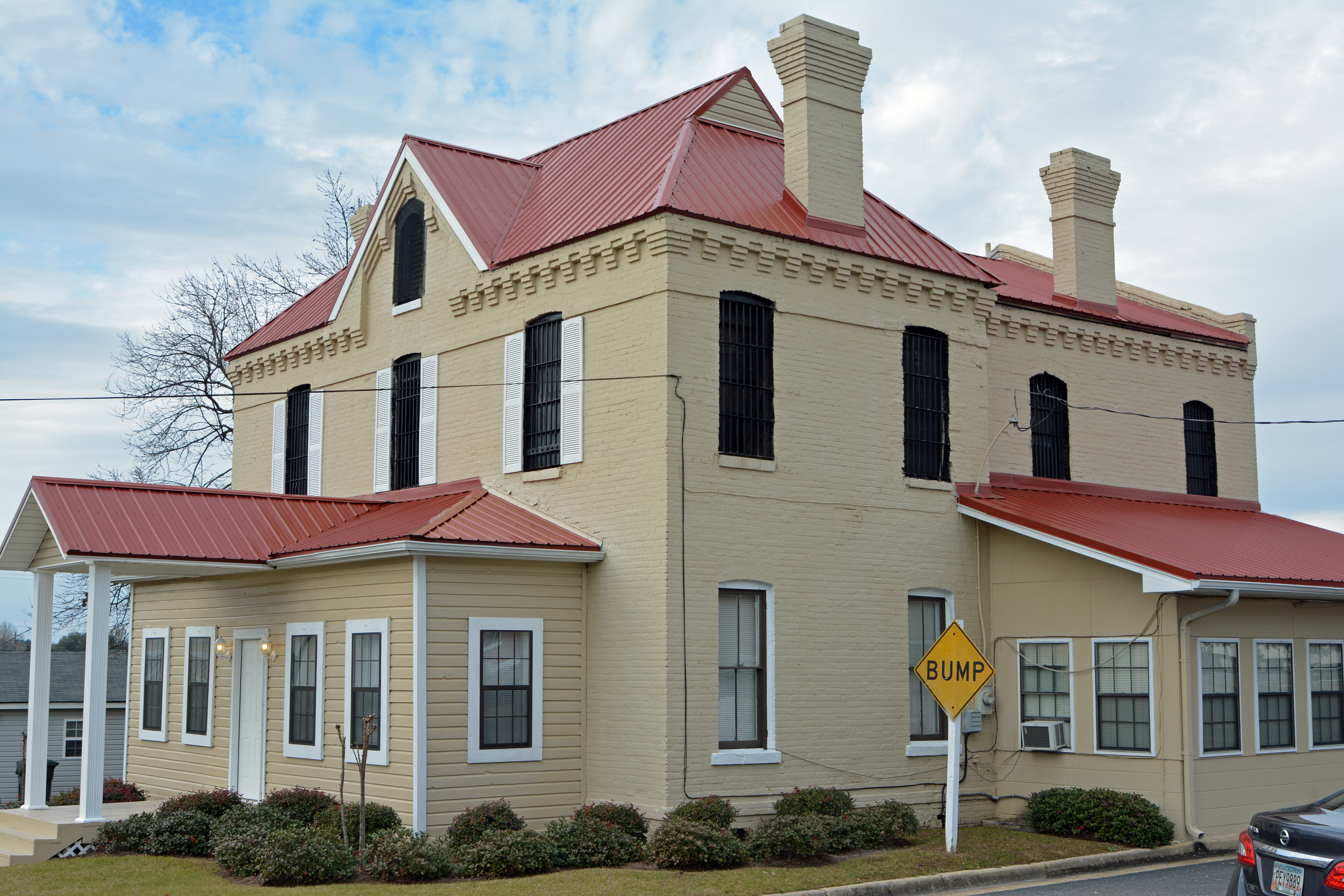
The old jail in 2016, with modern additions

The Telfair County, Georgia Courthouse in McRae-Helena was built in 1934 using the walls of the previous courthouse, lost to fire earlier that year. It was designed by architects Dennis & Dennis. The nearby Telfair County Jail was built in 1902. The courthouse and jail were added to the National Register of Historic Places in 1995.

== History ==
Telfair county, named for Governor Edward Telfair, was established in 1807. Its first two courthouses, one of log, the other a two-story wooden building, were located in the original county seat at Jacksonville. Jacksonville, with its plantation economy and river landing, was replaced as county seat in 1870 by McRae, located on the Macon and Brunswick Railroad.

The third courthouse, the first in McRae, was a frame building built in 1872 or 1873, and was replaced by a brick courthouse in 1888. That courthouse burned around 1900 and was replaced by Telfair's fifth courthouse, again of brick, in 1904. It burned in 1934 and was replaced by the current, sixth, courthouse later that year using the walls of the 1904 building.

The jail was built in 1902 near the eventual location of the 1904 courthouse. It was the first brick jail in the county.

== Architecture ==
The courthouse, in the Colonial Revival-style, is a two-story brick building. The main entrance features three arched entryways and an in antis portico. The side and rear entrances are pedimented with transoms and double doors.

The jail is a two-story brick building with hipped roof, four chimneys, center front gable, and an enclosed front porch. There is decorative brick detailing along the cornice.

The Macon, Georgia architecture firm of Dennis & Dennis designed the courthouse, as well as the Emanuel County and Peach County courthouses, both listed on the National Register of Historic Places. The Telfair County Courthouse and Jail were added to the register in 1995.
