= Tom Buck =

American politician (1938–2020)

Member of the Georgia House of Representatives
- In office January 9, 1967 – January 10, 2005
- Preceded by: Jack T. Brinkley
- Constituency: 112th district (1967–1969); 84th district (1969–1973); 87th district (1973–1975); 95th district (1975–1993); 135th district (1993–2003); 112th district (2003–2005)

Personal details
- Born: Thomas Bryant Buck III; March 2, 1938 Columbus, Georgia, U.S.
- Died: January 2, 2020 (aged 81) Columbus, Georgia, U.S.
- Party: Democratic
- Education: Emory University (BA, LLB)
- Profession: Attorney

Thomas Bryant Buck III (March 2, 1938 – January 2, 2020) was an American politician and lawyer.

== Biography ==
Buck was born on March 2, 1938, in Columbus, Georgia, graduating from Columbus High School in 1955. He served in the United States Army in 1963 and 1964. Buck received his bachelor's and law degrees from Emory University in 1959 and 1962. Buck practiced law in Columbus, Georgia. He was a member of the Georgia House of Representatives from 1966 to 2004. He was a member of the Democratic party. Buck served on the Columbus City Council for a brief time after he left the Georgia General Assembly. Buck died on January 2, 2020, aged 81, in Columbus Hospice in Columbus, Georgia.

Georgia House of Representatives
Preceded by Jack Brinkley	Member of the Georgia House of Representatives from the 112th district, Post 3; 1967–1969	Succeeded by Grace Towns Hamilton
Preceded by Steve D. Nimmer	Member of the Georgia House of Representatives from the 84th district, Post 3; 1969–1973	Succeeded by James Hoyt Adams
Preceded by Herbert Jones, Jr.	Member of the Georgia House of Representatives from the 87th district, Post 1; 1973–1975	Succeeded by Jack Connell
Preceded by Ward Edwards	Member of the Georgia House of Representatives from the 95th district 1975–1993	Succeeded by Gail Buckner
Preceded by Johnny Floyd	Member of the Georgia House of Representatives from the 135th district 1993–2003	Succeeded by Lawrence R. Roberts
Preceded by Bill Jackson	Member of the Georgia House of Representatives from the 112th district 2003–2005	Succeeded by Doug Holt
