= Straw polls for the 2016 Democratic Party presidential primaries =

The following is a list of notable straw polls for the 2016 Democratic Party's presidential nomination.

== October 8–18, 2015 - Georgia National Fair "Peanut Poll" Straw Poll ==
Finish	Candidate	Votes	Percentage
1	Hillary Clinton	2,513	48.10%
2	Bernie Sanders	929	17.78%
3	Joe Biden	396	7.58%
4	Jim Webb	110	2.11%
5	Lincoln Chafee	56	1.07%
6	Martin O'Malley	56	1.07%
7	Undecided	1,170	22.39%

== 2015 Democratic Party of Wisconsin Straw Poll ==
511 delegates, alternates, and registered guests at the Wisconsin party convention on June 6, 2015.

Finish	Candidate	Percentage	Votes
1	Hillary Clinton	49%	252
2	Bernie Sanders	41%	208
3	Joe Biden	3%	16
4	Martin O'Malley	3%	16
5	Jim Webb	2%	8
6	Lincoln Chafee	1%	5
7	Elizabeth Warren*	1%	4
8	Tom Vilsack*	<1%	1

* Write-ins

== 2014 Democratic Party of Wisconsin Straw Poll ==
323 delegates, June 7

Finish	Candidate	Percentage	Votes
1	Hillary Clinton	57%	185
2	Elizabeth Warren	25%	81
3	Joe Biden	6%	18
4	Bernie Sanders	3%	10
5	Martin O'Malley	3%	9
6	Brian Schweitzer	2%	6
7	Amy Klobuchar	1%	4
8	Andrew Cuomo	1%	2
9	Kirsten Gillibrand	1%	2
10	Mark Warner	1%	2
11	Russ Feingold	1%	2
12	Deval Patrick	<1%	1
13	John Hickenlooper	<1%	1
