= Leesburg High School =

Leesburg High School may refer to:

- Leesburg High School (Leesburg, Florida)
- Leesburg High School (Leesburg, Georgia)
