= Turner County Courthouse =

- U.S. National Register of Historic Places
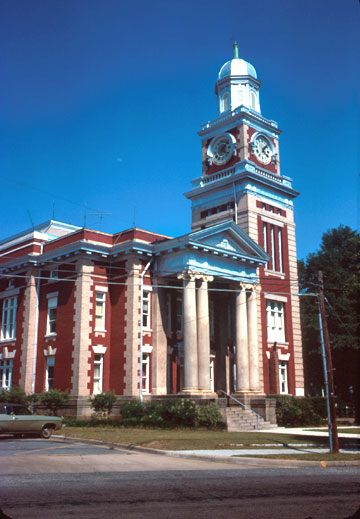
- 1971 courthouse photograph by Calvin Beale.

- Location within Georgia Location within the United States
- Location: 219 East College Avenue; Ashburn, Georgia 31714
- Coordinates: 31.707673°N 83.652558°W
- Area: Georgia County Courthouses TR
- Built: 1907-08
- Architect: Alexander Blair III and Peter E. Dennis
- Architectural style: Classical Revival adaption; Neo-Georgian and Colonial Revival influences
- NRHP reference No.: 80001247
- Added to NRHP: September 18, 1980

Turner County Courthouse is a historic county courthouse in Ashburn, Georgia, the county seat of Turner County, Georgia. The Classical Revival building was designed by two Macon architects, Alexander Blair III (who also designed seven other Georgia courthouses) and Peter E. Dennis. The courthouse is located at 219 East College Avenue, close to several historic homes.

The courthouse was constructed in 1907-1908, shortly after the county was formed by an act of the Georgia Legislature on August 18, 1905, from parts of Dooly, Irwin, Wilcox, and Worth counties. Ashburn was designated the county seat when the county was formed. The courthouse has served as the county government's offices since that time. The Turner County Courthouse was added to the National Register of Historic Places on September 18, 1980. The courthouse underwent restorations in 1984 and 2001.

== Architecture ==
The construction is of brick and stone, and the New Georgia Guide published by the University of Georgia Press describes the building as "impressive." While the other courthouses designed by Alexander Blair III reflect traditional Neoclassicism, the design of the Turner County Courthouse (like the Decatur County Courthouse) is characterized by Neoclassical variations. It features a more flamboyant style that reflect the influence of Neo-Georgian/Colonial Revival architecture, giving a historical atmosphere to the building, as well as a somewhat Italianate appearance. The courthouse is asymmetrical because it includes a three-story clock tower, located on the west side of the building. The clock was made by the E. Howard Watch & Clock Company. The courthouse still has the original tin tiles, popular when the building was constructed, as well as an upper balcony where, before desegregation, black people were required to sit. A state historical marker, erected by the Georgia Historical Commission in 1954, is located on the courthouse lawn.

== Gallery ==
Courthouse in 2015

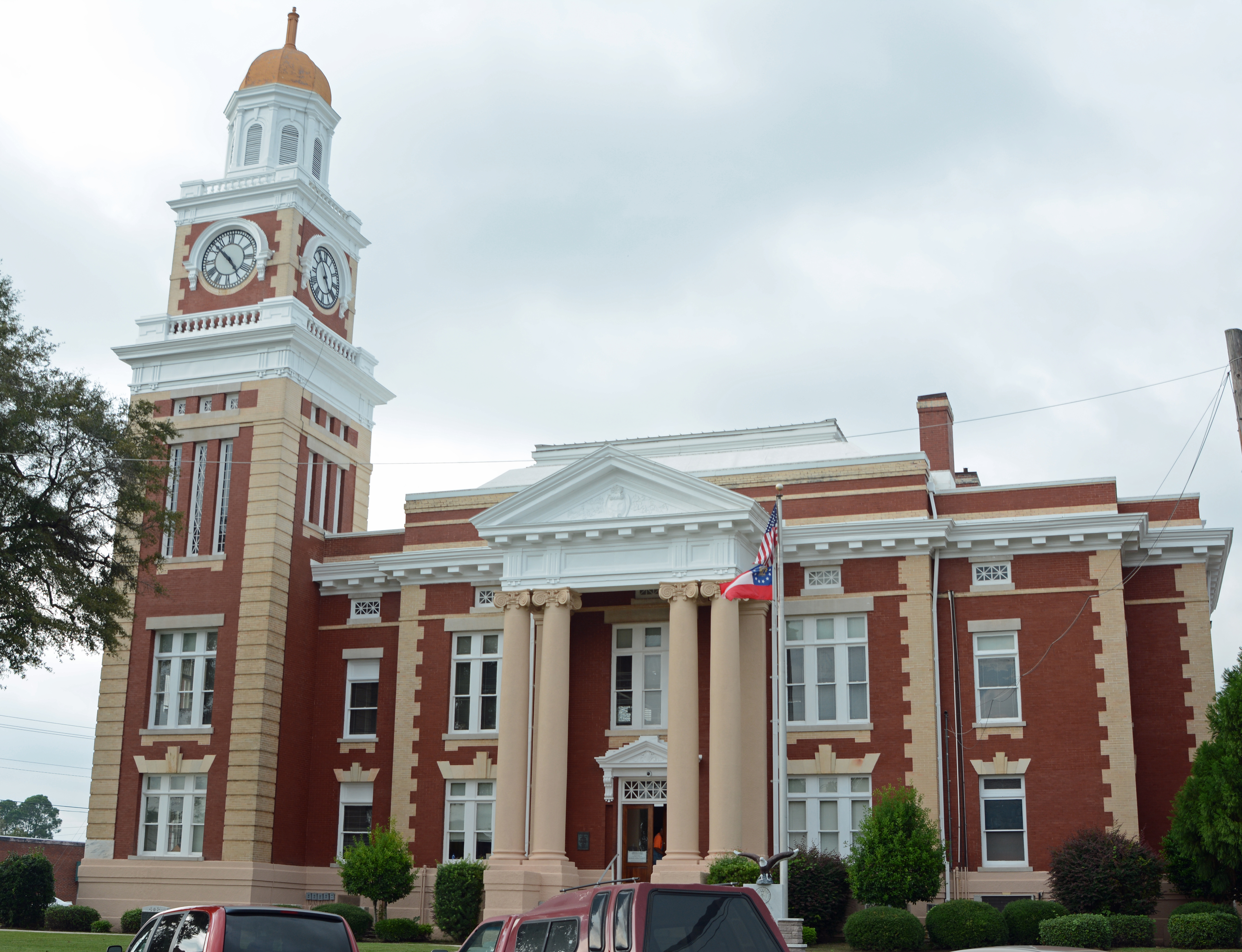
South side

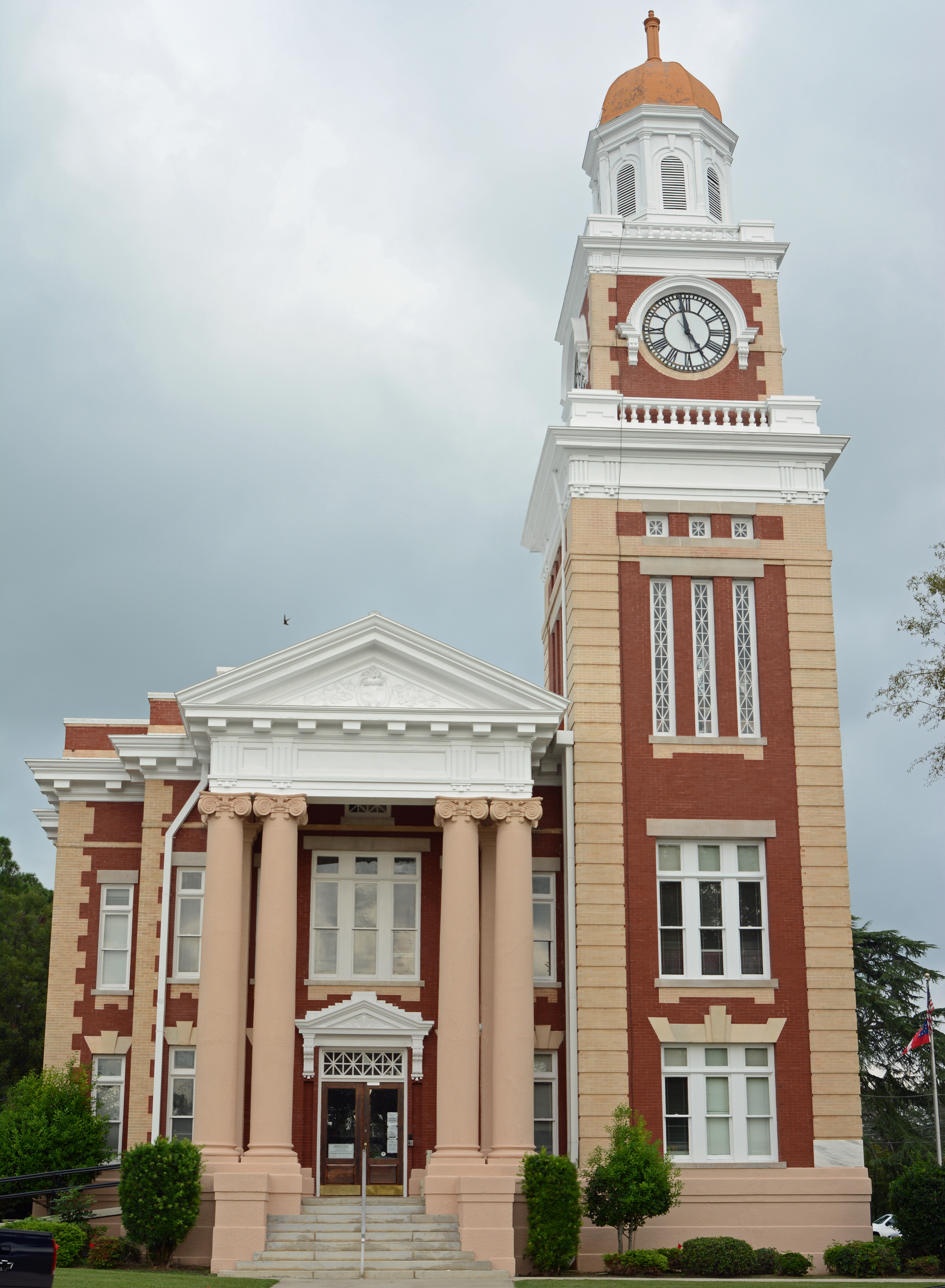
West side

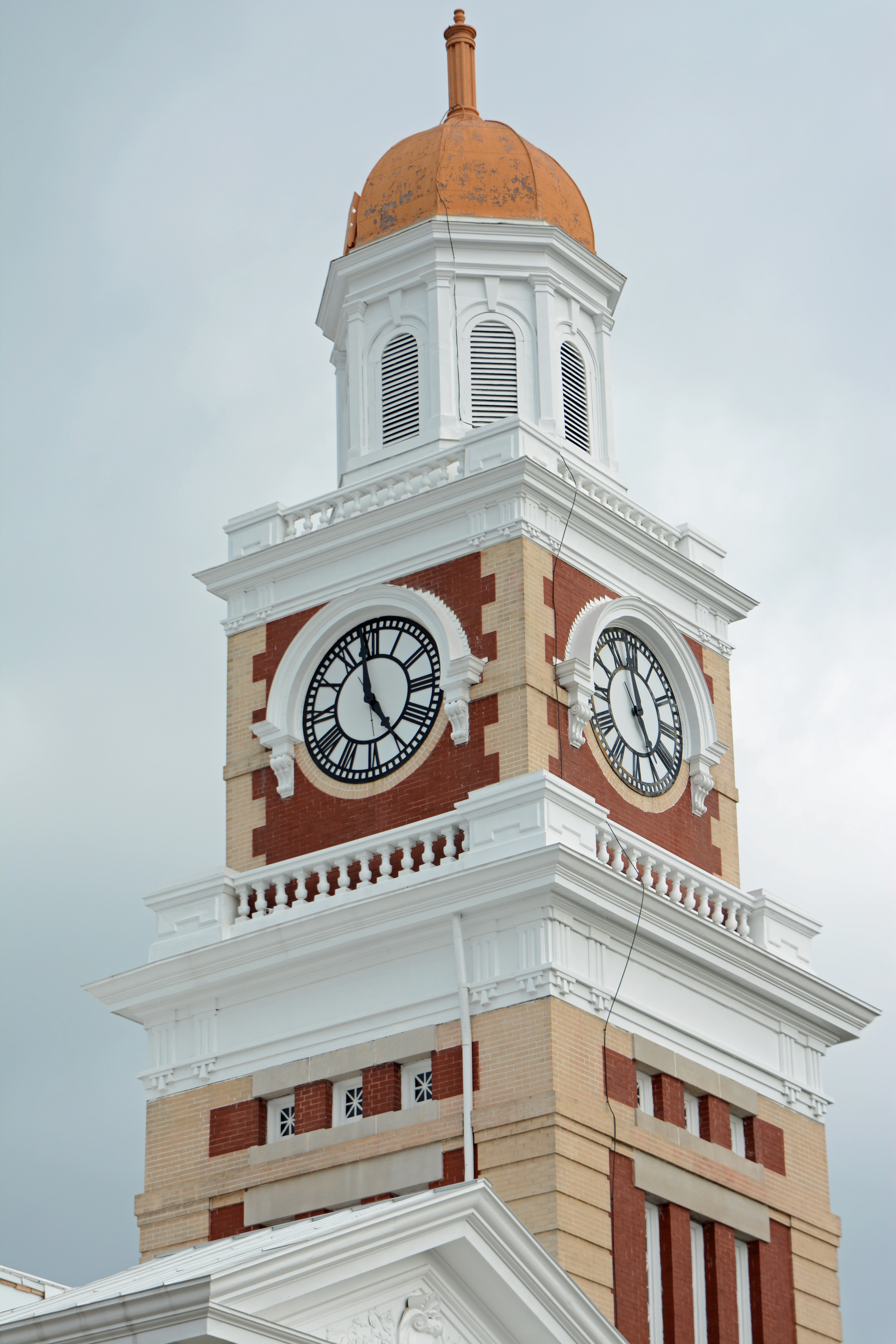
Clock tower

== See also ==
- National Register of Historic Places listings in Turner County, Georgia
