= National Register of Historic Places listings in Houston County, Georgia =

Location of Houston County in Georgia

This is a list of properties and districts in Houston County, Georgia that are listed on the National Register of Historic Places (NRHP).

This National Park Service list is complete through NPS recent listings posted July 31, 2026.

== Current listings ==
	Name on the Register	Image	Date listed	Location	City or town	Description
1	Davis-Felton Plantation	Davis-Felton Plantation	November 13, 1979 (#79000731)	NW of Henderson on Felton Rd. 32°22′32″N 83°48′35″W	Henderson	
2	Log Dogtrot House		May 30, 1991 (#91000681)	0.5 miles (0.80 km) E of jct. of GA 247 and Story St. 32°29′45″N 83°36′04″W	Kathleen	
3	Warner Robins Depot	Warner Robins Depot	January 2, 2008 (#07001336)	1st St. 32°37′12″N 83°36′01″W	Warner Robins	Now houses the E.L. Greenway Welcome Center

== Former listings ==
	Name on the Register	Image	Date listed	Date removed	Location	City or town	Description
1	New Perry Hotel	New Perry Hotel	April 1, 2004 (#04000241)	August 6, 2026	800 Main St. 32°27′25″N 83°44′01″W	Perry	
