= Alexander Blair =

Alexander Blair may refer to:

- Alexander Blair (architect) (1867–1931), American architect
- Alexander Blair (rugby union) (1865–1936), Scottish rugby union player
- Alexander Blair (writer) (1782–1878), English writer and academic
- Alex Blair (born 1990), Scottish rugby union player
