= Georgia National Fairgrounds and Agricenter =

Coordinates: 32°26′15″N 83°45′0″W

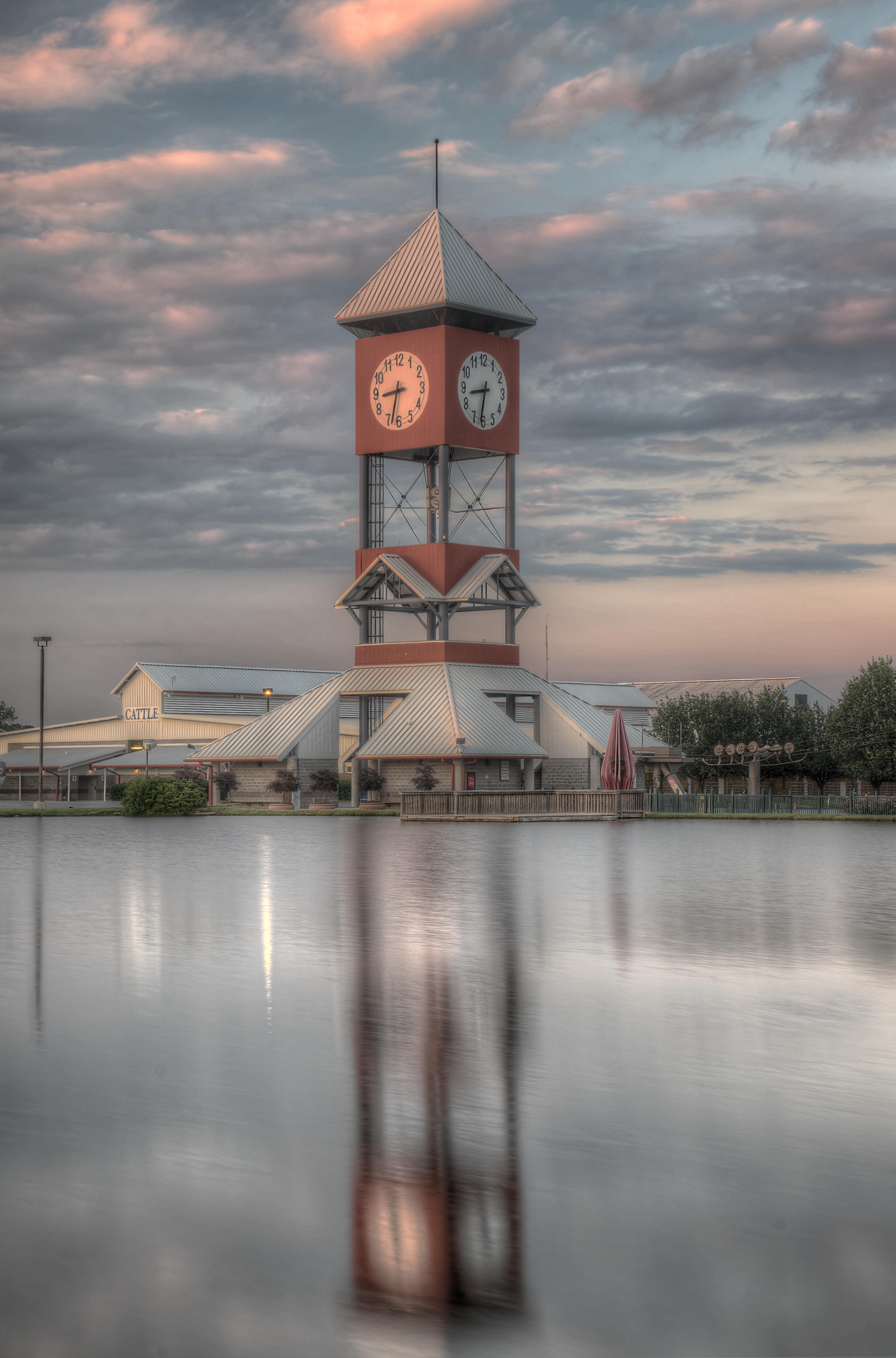
Clock Tower

The Georgia National Fairgrounds and Agricenter in Perry, Georgia, United States, is a state-owned, multipurpose, 1,100+ acre rental complex which is open year-round. It is specially designed for meetings, conferences, livestock and horse shows, concerts, rodeos, RV rallies, trade shows, and sporting events. The fairgrounds opened in 1990. The biggest attraction is the annual Georgia National Fair that is held the 5th Thursday after Labor Day. It runs for 11 days. Other major events held here include the Georgia National Junior Livestock Show in February, and the Georgia National Rodeo, also in February.

The creation of the complex can be traced to efforts by Representative Henry L. Reaves (D-Quitman) and Representative Larry Walker (D-Perry). The Reaves Arena, an 8,250-seat multi-purpose arena within the complex, is named in honor of Representative Reaves. It hosts local sporting events and concerts. It was opened in 1990.
