= New Perry Hotel =

Historic hotel in Georgia, US

- Formerly listed on the U.S. National Register of Historic Places
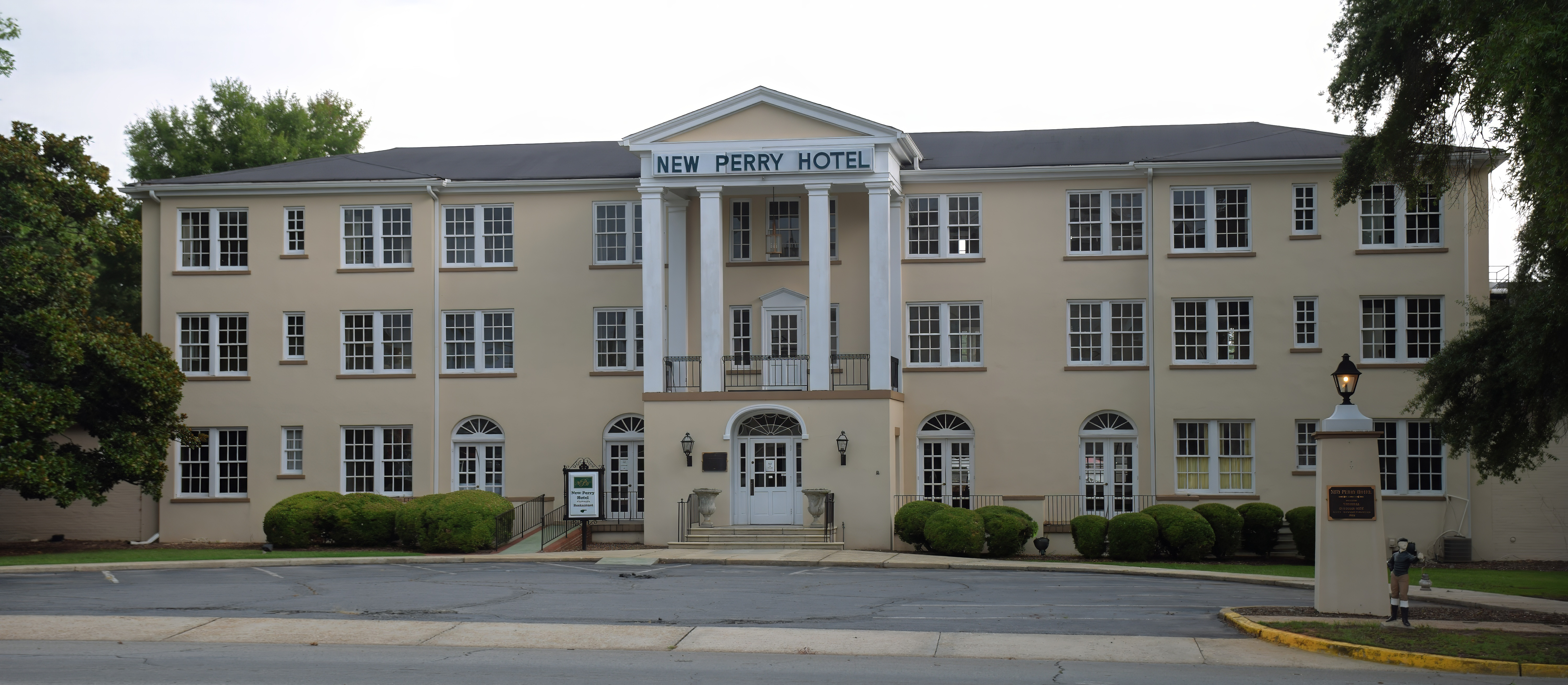
- New Perry Hotel and Tavern

- Location within Georgia
- Location: 800 Main St., Perry, Georgia
- Coordinates: 32.45697°N 83.73350°W
- Area: 2 acres (0.81 ha)
- Built: 1925
- Architect: Dennis & Dennis; Davenport Guerry
- Architectural style: Classical Revival, Colonial Revival
- Demolished: 2024
- NRHP reference No.: 04000241

Significant dates
- Added to NRHP: April 1, 2004
- Removed from NRHP: August 6, 2026

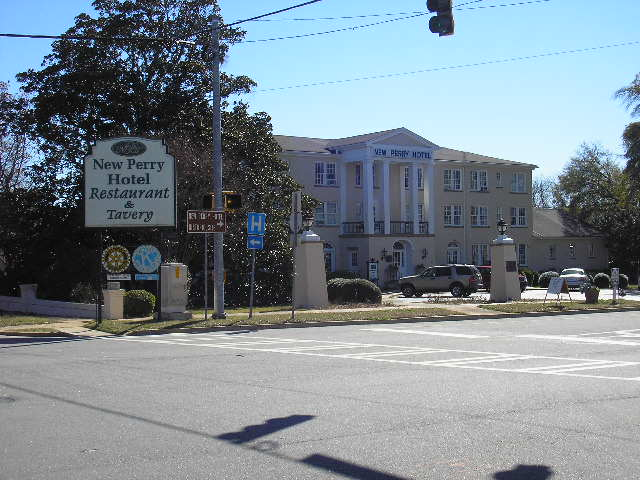
Street view

New Perry Hotel was a historic hotel in Perry, Georgia, located at 800 Main Street. It consisted of a three-story, 40 room Neoclassical hotel built in 1925, and a one-story, eight-room Colonial Revival motel, which was built in 1955 and enlarged in 1959 with a pool, cabana, and 9 more rooms. In 1947 a kitchen and banquet hall were built. Between 1955 and 1959 the rear lobby was converted into the motel office and a card room was built. The original full-height portico was altered in 1965. The round Tuscan columns were replaced by square Tuscan columns.

It replaced an older two-story hotel known as the Perry Hotel, with a wide front veranda and 20 guest rooms, built on the same site in 1870 by James N. Tuttle. The 1870 hotel itself replaced an older hotel called the Tavery, built in 1833 by Phenias Oliver, when Perry's Courthouse Square across the street served as a stagecoach stop. A succession of owners followed Tuttle until Rochelle Cheves Skellie acquired the property around 1920, and rebuilt the hotel in the hope of attract Northern tourists travelling back and forth from Florida.

The New Perry Hotel was designed by architects Dennis and Dennis; Davenport Guerry was the landscape architect. The hotel is best known for its ownership by local civic leaders Yates and Nannette Green, who owned and operated the hotel for over 50 years, from 1944 to 1997. They had a reputation for “good food and southern hospitality”, earning recommendations from Duncan Hines and the AAA. The hotel also became a popular meeting place for local civic groups such as the Kiwanis and the Civitan Club to hold their regular meetings, and a favorite dining venue for local residents.

It was added to the National Register of Historic Places on April 1, 2004. The hotel closed about 2014.

On July 22, 2024, the hotel was demolished in order to build a new commercial building, a year shy of the New Hotel's 100th anniversary. This occurred despite its national registry, the owner claiming that the hotel's condition was beyond repair.

== See also ==
- National Register of Historic Places listings in Houston County, Georgia
