= Ezekiel Roy Lambert =

American politician

Member of the Georgia State Senate
- In office 1955–1956
- In office 1961–1962

Member of the Georgia House of Representatives from the 112th district
- In office 1963–1983
- Succeeded by: Ward Edwards

Member of the Georgia House of Representatives from the 66th district
- In office 1983–1985
- Preceded by: Vacant
- Succeeded by: Frank E. Stancil

Personal details
- Born: June 18, 1925 Morgan County, Georgia, U.S.
- Died: February 22, 2008 (aged 82)
- Party: Democratic
- Spouse: Christine Davis
- Children: 3
- Education: Tulane University; University of Georgia

Ezekiel Roy Lambert Jr. (June 18, 1925 – February 22, 2008) was an American politician. He served as a Democratic member for the 66th and 112th district of the Georgia House of Representatives. He also served as a member of the Georgia State Senate.

== Life and career ==
Lambert was born in Morgan County, Georgia, the son of Lula McLendon and Ezekiel Roy Lambert Sr. He attended Tulane University and the University of Georgia. He served in the United States Navy during World War II.

Lambert was elected to the Georgia State Senate, serving two separate terms from 1955 to 1956 and from 1961 to 1962. In 1963, he was elected to represent the 112th district of the Georgia House of Representatives. He served until 1983, when he was succeeded by Ward Edwards. The same year, he was elected to the 66th district, serving until 1985, when he was succeeded by Frank E. Stancil.

Lambert died in February 2008, at the age of 82.
