= Warner Robins station =

Historic train station in Georgia, US

- Warner Robins Depot
- U.S. National Register of Historic Places
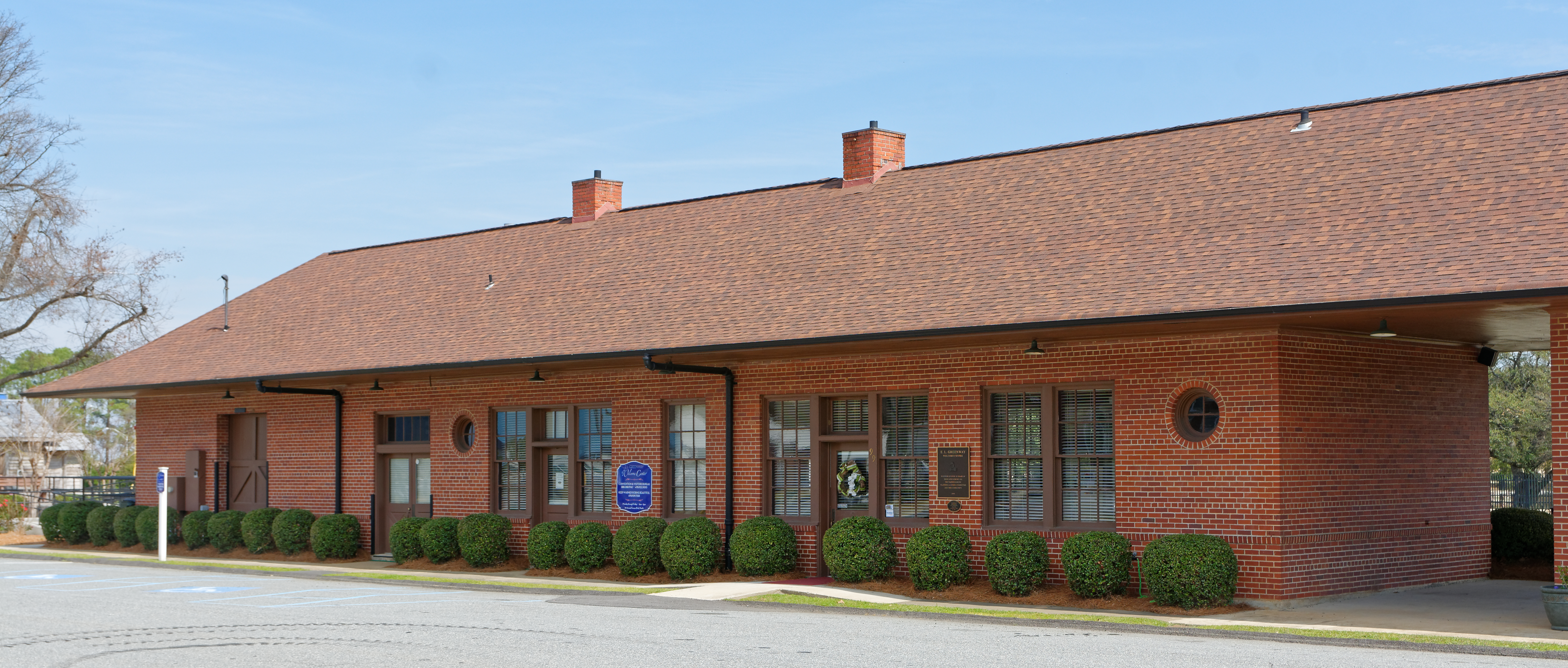
- The depot

- Location within Georgia
- Location: 1st Street, Warner Robins, Georgia
- Coordinates: 32.62010°N 83.60018°W
- Area: less than one acre
- Built: 1943-44
- Built by: Southern Railway Co.; Elliot Building Co.
- Architectural style: Mid-20th Century RR Depot
- NRHP reference No.: 07001336
- Added to NRHP: January 2, 2008

Warner Robins Train Depot is a historic train depot in Warner Robins, Georgia in Houston County. It was added to the National Register of Historic Places on January 2, 2008. It is located at 99 North Armed Forces Boulevard, across the street from the main gate of Robins Air Force Base.

It was built during 1943-44 as a combined passenger and freight depot. It is a one-story brick building. It was designed with separate waiting areas for white passengers vs. African-American passengers. In 2007 (and still in 2017) it served as the E.L. Greenway Welcome Center for Warner Robins and the Warner Robins Convention and Visitors' Bureau. It has a caboose, Mildred's Country Store, the Elberta Depot Heritage Center, and World War II Museum.

== See also ==
- National Register of Historic Places listings in Houston County, Georgia

Preceding station	Southern Railway	Following station
Centerville toward Chattanooga	Chattanooga – Jacksonville	Woody Acres toward Jacksonville
