= Southeastern Holiness Institute =

- U.S. National Register of Historic Places
- Location within Georgia Location within the United States
- Location: 102 Hospital Circle, Donalsonville, Georgia
- Coordinates: 31°3′3″N 84°52′51″W
- Area: 4.3 acres (1.7 ha)
- Built: 1914
- Built by: Dennis, Peter E.
- Architectural style: Colonial Revival, Georgian revival
- NRHP reference No.: 82002463
- Added to NRHP: June 21, 1982

The Southeastern Holiness Institute, also known as Chason's Hospital and as Donalsonville Hospital, was built in 1914. It was built as a religious educational institution, but was converted in 1918 to a private hospital. It was listed on the National Register of Historic Places in 1982.

The building was designed by architect Peter E. Dennis in provincial Georgian Revival style.
