= Leesburg station =

- Leesburg Depot
- U.S. National Register of Historic Places
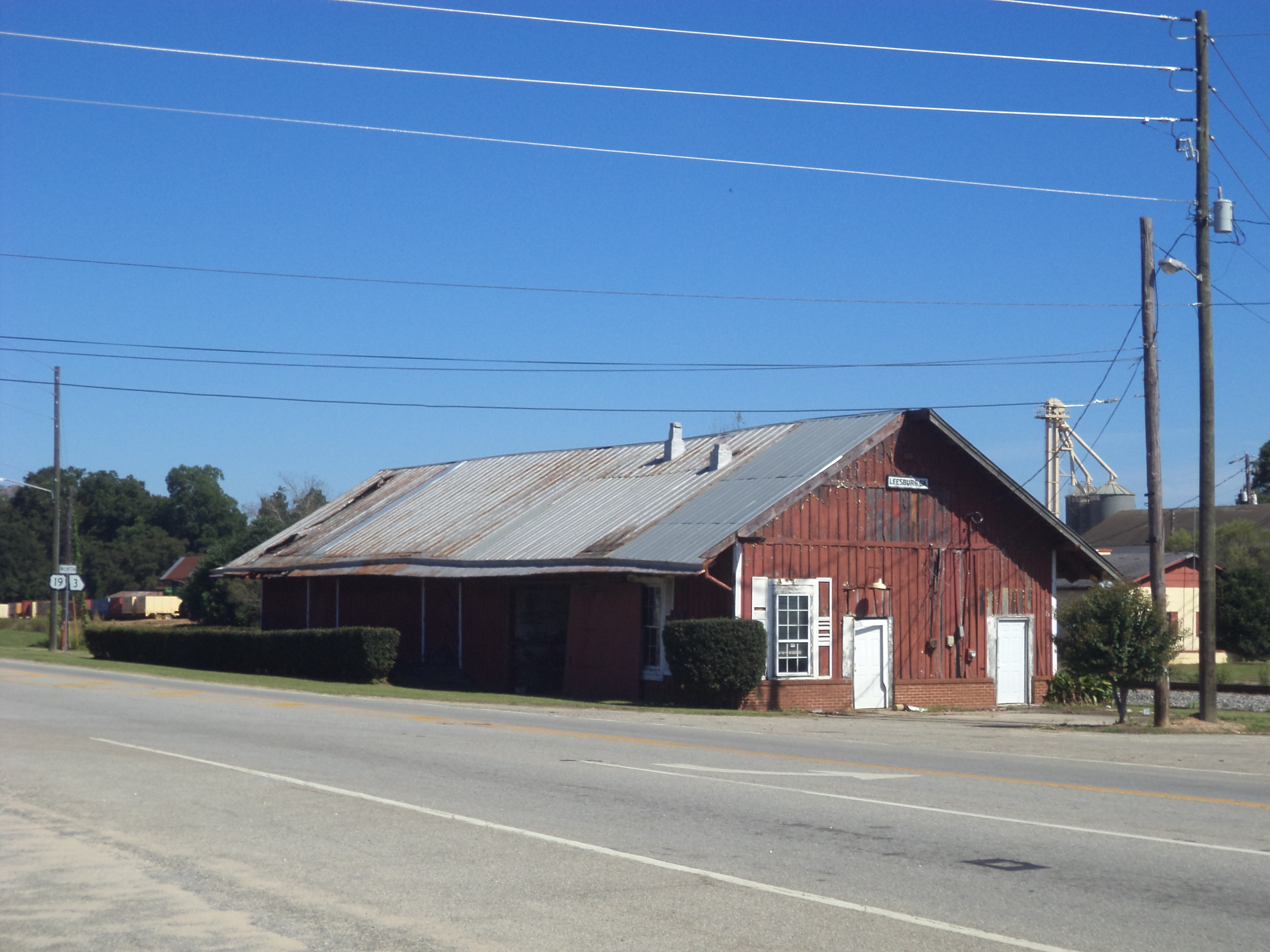

- Location within Georgia Location within the United States
- Location: 106 Walnut Ave. N., Leesburg, Georgia
- Coordinates: 31.73272°N 84.17230°W
- Area: less than one acre
- Built: 1895
- Architectural style: Late 19th century RR depot
- NRHP reference No.: 08000395
- Added to NRHP: May 12, 2008

Leesburg Depot is a historic train depot in Leesburg, Georgia. It was on the old Central of Georgia Railway. It was damaged in a 2006 storm. It was added to the National Register of Historic Places on May 12, 2008. It is located at 106 Walnut Avenue North. In 2013, studies were being carried out regarding a possible restoration.

Preceding station	Central of Georgia Railway	Following station
Forrester toward Lockhart	Lockhart – Macon	Adams toward Macon

== See also ==
- National Register of Historic Places listings in Lee County, Georgia
