= National Register of Historic Places listings in Lee County, Georgia =

This is a list of properties and districts in Lee County, Georgia that are listed on the National Register of Historic Places (NRHP).

This National Park Service list is complete through NPS recent listings posted March 21, 2025.

== Current listings ==
	Name on the Register	Image	Date listed	Location	City or town	Description
1	Lee County Courthouse	Lee County Courthouse	September 18, 1980 (#80001104)	Courthouse Sq. 31°43′57″N 84°10′16″W	Leesburg	
2	Leesburg Depot	Leesburg Depot	May 12, 2008 (#08000395)	106 Walnut Ave. N. 31°43′58″N 84°10′20″W	Leesburg	
3	Leesburg High School	Leesburg High School	February 1, 2006 (#05001595)	100 Starkville Ave. 31°43′55″N 84°10′03″W	Leesburg	
