= Lee County Courthouse (Georgia) =

- U.S. National Register of Historic Places
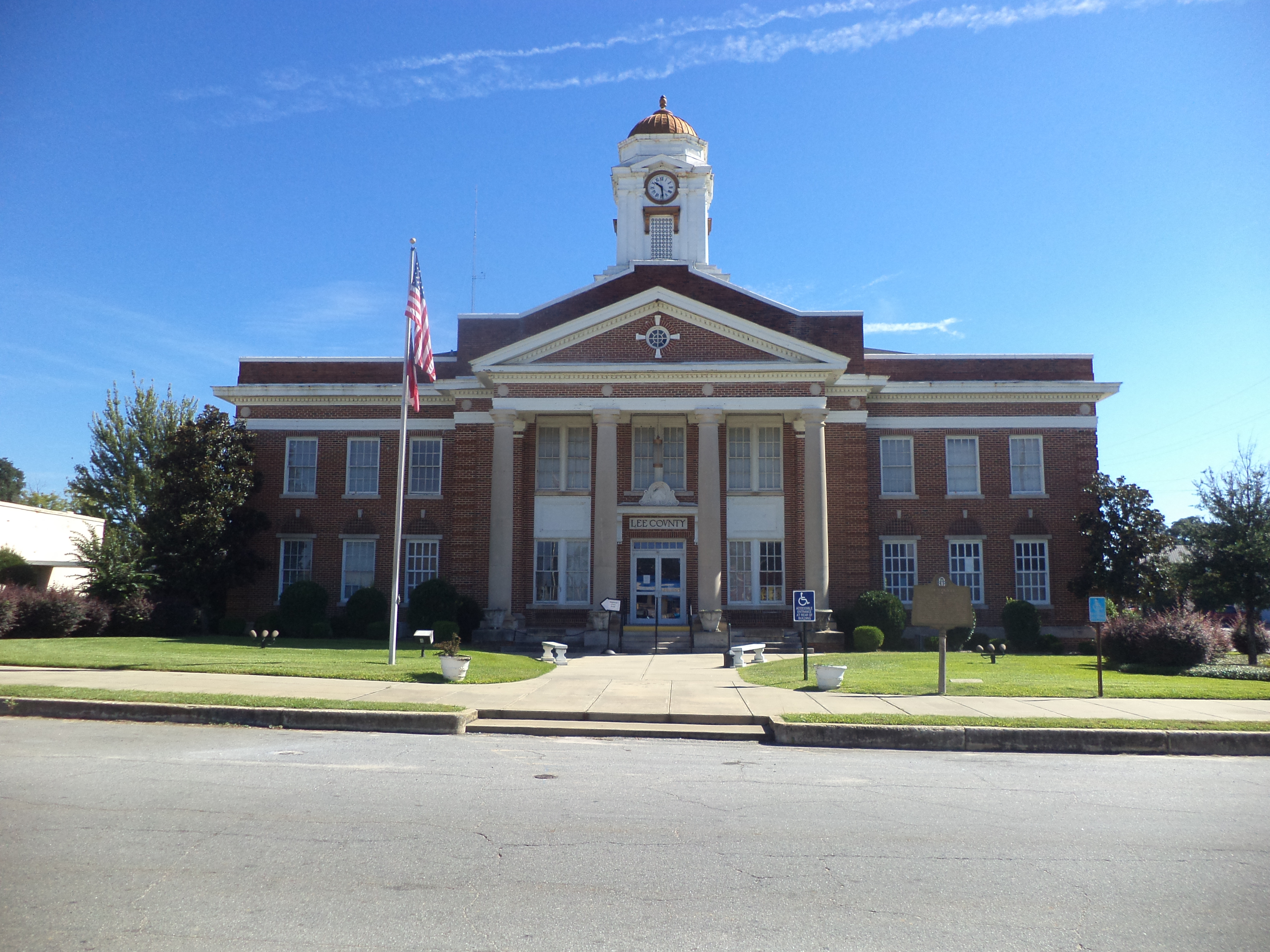

- Location within Georgia
- Location: Courthouse Sq., Leesburg, Georgia
- Coordinates: 31°43′57″N 84°10′16″W
- Area: 1 acre (0.40 ha)
- Built: 1917
- Built by: Wimbish, R.W.
- Architect: J.J. Baldwin
- Architectural style: Classical Revival
- MPS: Georgia County Courthouses TR
- NRHP reference No.: 80001104
- Added to NRHP: September 18, 1980

Lee County Courthouse is a historic county courthouse in on Courthouse Square in Leesburg, Georgia, the county seat of Lee County, Georgia. It was designed by J.J. Baldwin in Neoclassical Revival architecture and built in 1918.

The building has a Doric tetrastyle entrance. It has a small square domed clock tower. The interior of the building has a cross plan, with four entrances. There are additions to the building in the rear. A staircase leads to the courtroom on the second floor, which was wood paneling and plaster walls.

It was added to the National Register of Historic Places in 1980.

== See also ==
- National Register of Historic Places listings in Lee County, Georgia
