= Georgia National Fair =

National fair

Coordinates: 32°26′26.72″N 83°45′0.78″W

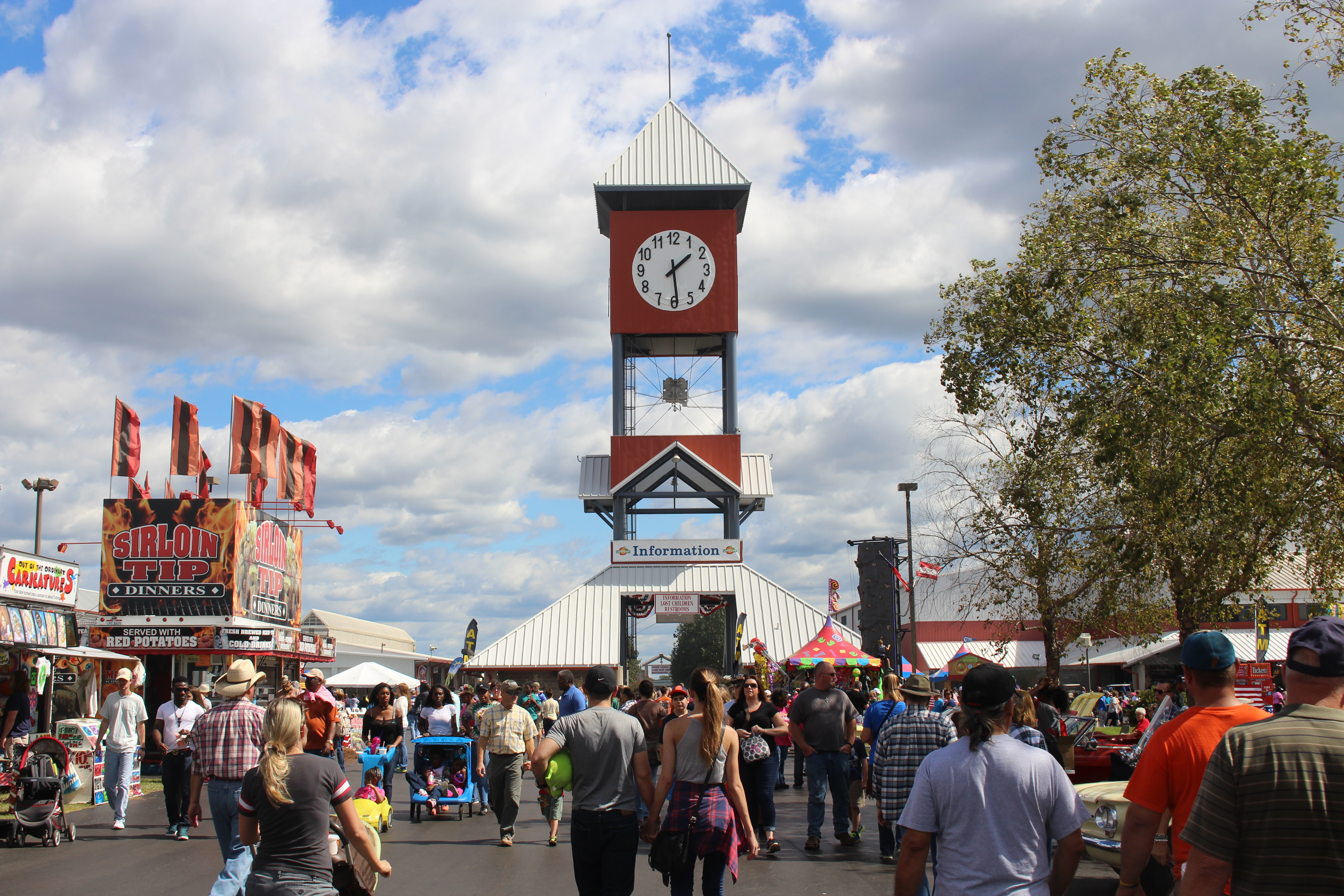
- Clock tower at the Fair
- Genre: State fair
- Dates: 9–10 days in early October
- Frequency: Annually
- Locations: Perry, Georgia
- Years active: 1990–present (excluding 2020)
- Next event: October 8–18, 2026
- Website: Georgia National Fair

The Georgia National Fair is a state-sponsored fair that is held beginning on the first Thursday of every October on the Georgia National Fairgrounds and Agricenter in Perry, Georgia, United States.

The Georgia National Fair is now a 10-day fair that was first held in 1990. It has grown to attract an annual average of over 565,500 visitors. It offers a wide range of activities and shows, such as agricultural, livestock and horse shows, home and fine arts competitions, youth organization events (4-H, FBLA, FCCLA, FFA, HOSA and TSA), circus, midway rides and games, fair food, free (with admission) major live music concerts on the Georgia National Stage (among others placed throughout the fairgrounds), family entertainment, and nightly fireworks.

The Georgia National Fair is the official state-sponsored fair, administered through the Georgia Agricultural Exposition Authority.

The rides have been provided by Reithoffer Shows since 1990.

There was no fair in 2020.
