= Decatur County Courthouse (Georgia) =

Historic courthouse in Georgia, US

- U.S. National Register of Historic Places
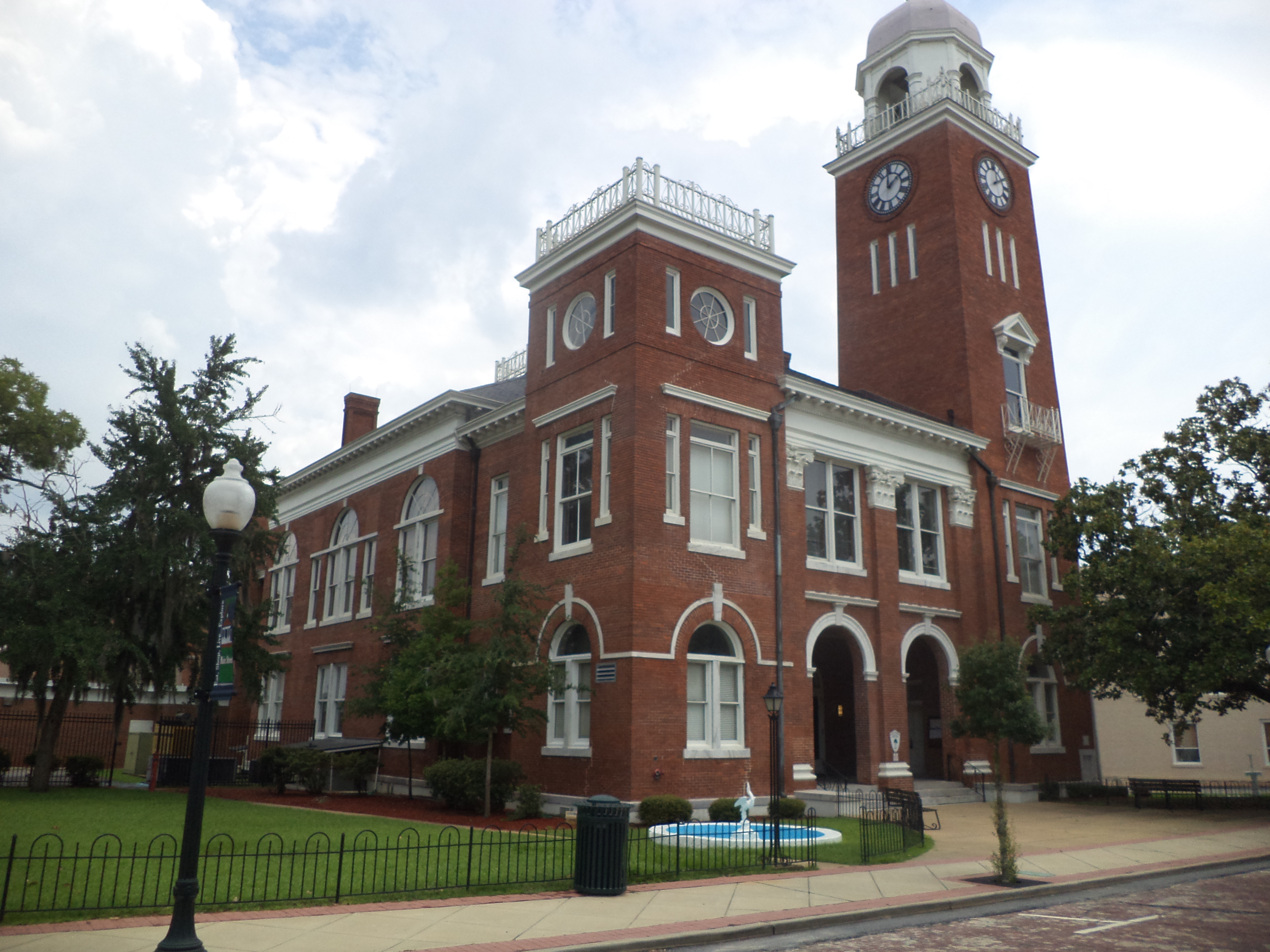

- Location within Georgia Location within the United States
- Location: 112 West Water Street; Bainbridge, Georgia 39818
- Coordinates: 30°54′24″N 84°34′37″W
- Area: Georgia County Courthouses TR
- Built: 1902
- Architect: Alexander Blair III
- Architectural style: Classical Revival
- NRHP reference No.: 80001011
- Added to NRHP: September 18, 1980

Decatur County Courthouse is a historic county courthouse in Bainbridge, Georgia, the county seat of Decatur County, Georgia. The Neoclassical building was designed by Alexander Blair III and built in 1902. It was added to the National Register of Historic Places on September 18, 1980. It is located on West Street and Water Street.

== See also ==
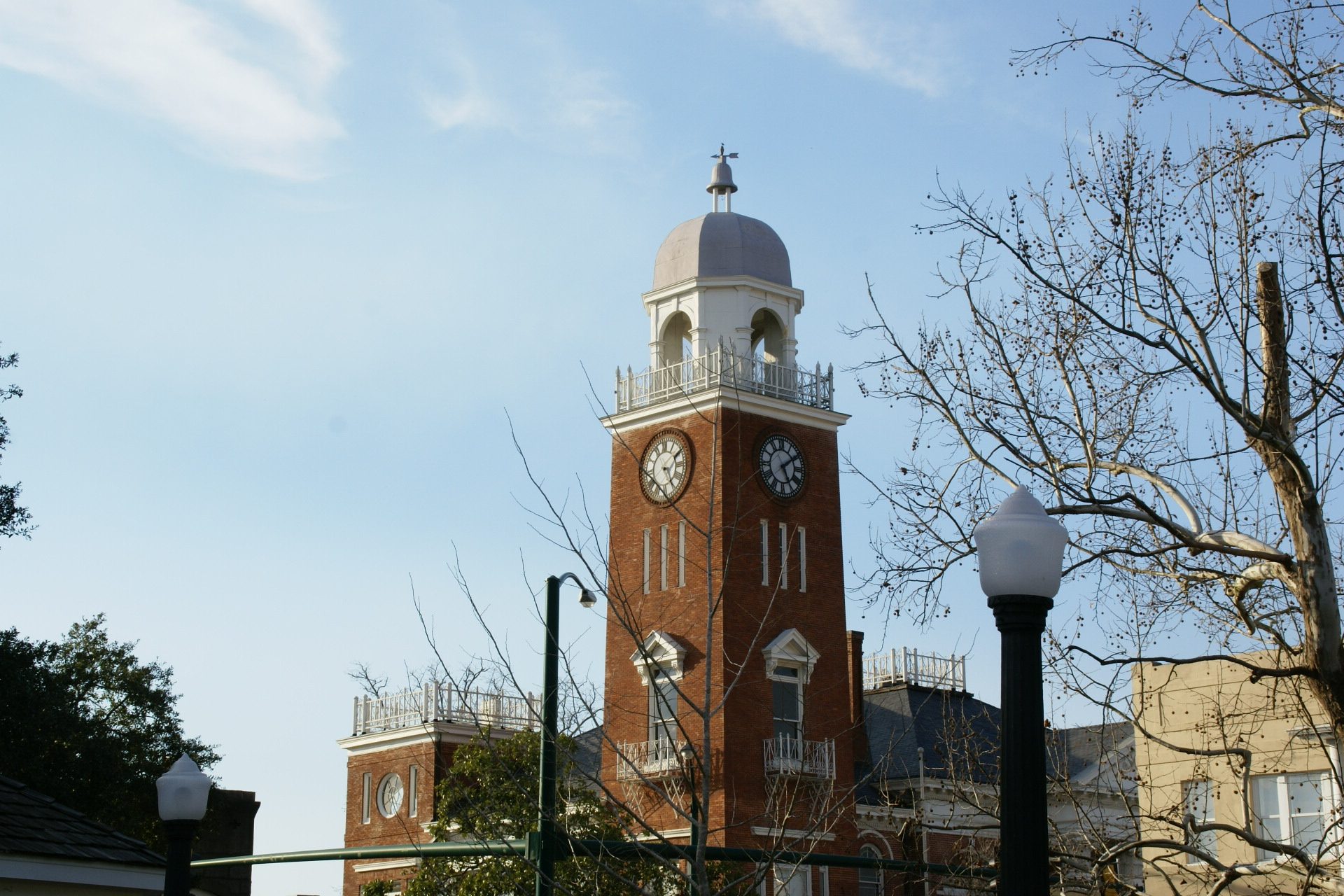
The courthouse clock tower.

- National Register of Historic Places listings in Decatur County, Georgia
