= Murray County Courthouse (Georgia) =

Historic courthouse in Georgia, US

- U.S. National Register of Historic Places
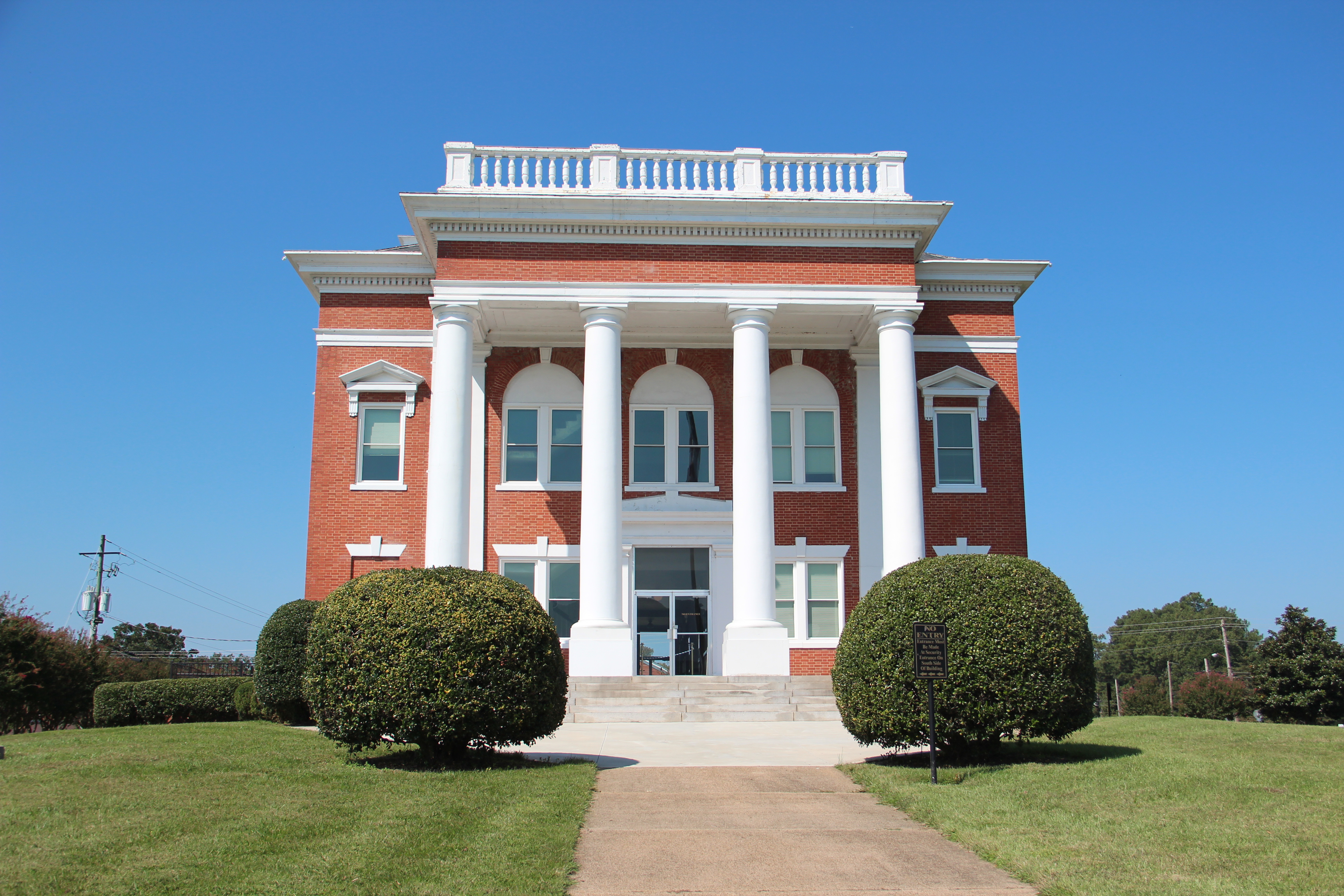
- Murray County Courthouse

- Location within Georgia Location within the United States
- Location: Courthouse Sq., Chatsworth, Georgia
- Coordinates: 34°46′1″N 84°46′14″W
- Built: 1916
- Built by: Carr, H.
- Architect: Alexander Blair
- Architectural style: Classical Revival, Palladian adaptation
- MPS: Georgia County Courthouses TR
- NRHP reference No.: 80001123
- Added to NRHP: September 18, 1980

Murray County Courthouse in Chatsworth, Georgia was built in 1916. It was listed on the National Register of Historic Places in 1980. It has an elevated position and can be viewed from afar.

A 1980 architectural survey identified it as one of only two Palladian architecture applications among Georgia courthouses. The other is the Old Effingham County Courthouse in Springfield, Georgia.

The survey asserted it "is the most important architectural structure in Chatsworth."
