= Emanuel County Courthouse =

Historic courthouse in Georgia, US

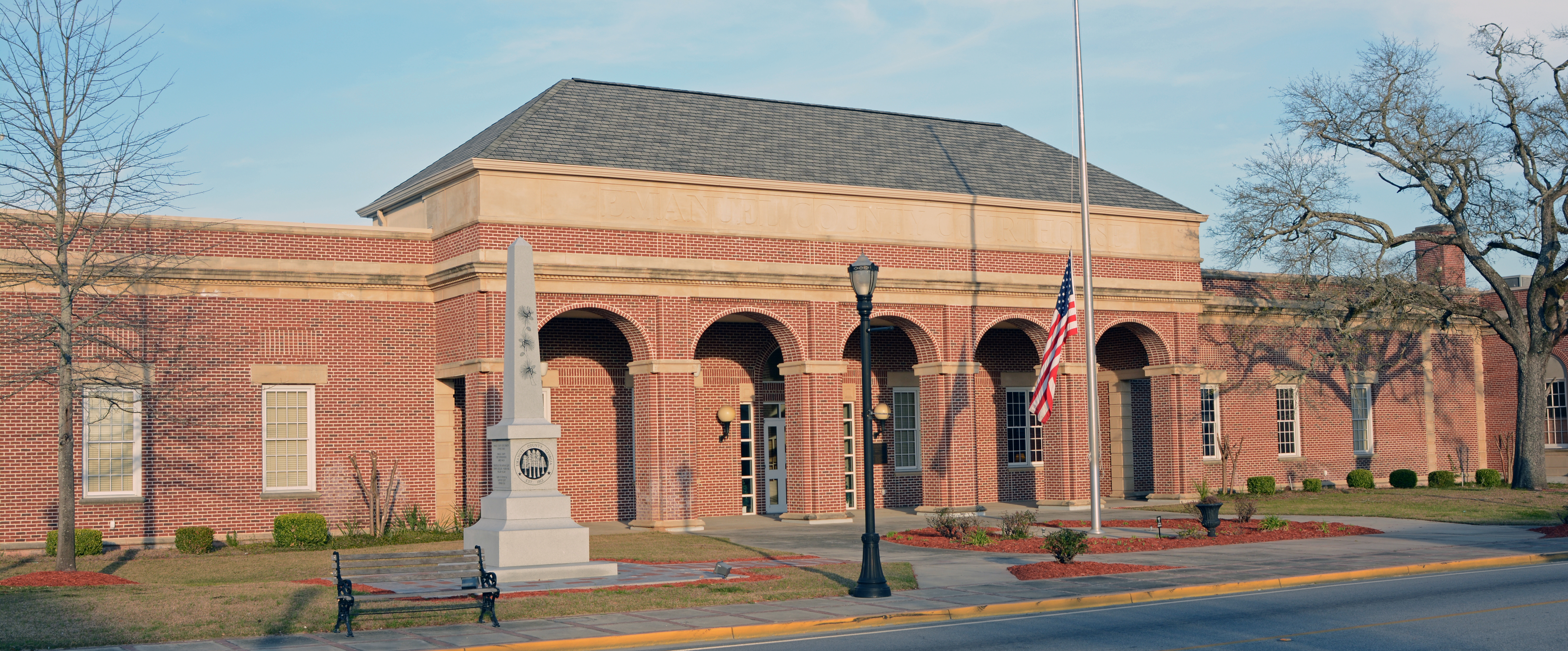
The 2002 courthouse and current courthouse in 2016

The Emanuel County Courthouse in Swainsboro, Georgia serves Emanuel County. The current building is the county's seventh courthouse.

== Former courthouse ==
- Emanuel County Courthouse and Sheriff Department
- U.S. National Register of Historic Places
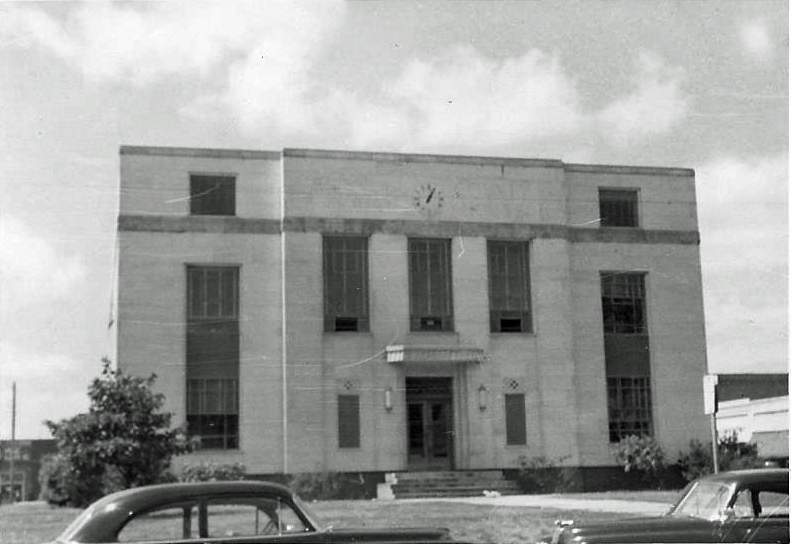
- The courthouse in 1951

- Location within Georgia Location within the United States
- Location: Main St., Swainsboro, Georgia
- Coordinates: 32°35′48″N 82°20′4″W
- Area: 1 acre (0.40 ha)
- Built: 1940 (courthouse); 1912 (Sheriff Department)
- Architect: Dennis and Dennis (courthouse); L.F. Goodrich (Sheriff Department)
- Architectural style: Stripped Classical;
- MPS: Georgia County Courthouses TR
- NRHP reference No.: 95000715
- Added to NRHP: June 14, 1995

The former courthouse in Swainsboro, built in 1940 and since demolished, and a sheriff department building, were listed on the National Register of Historic Places in 1995 as Emanuel County Courthouse and Sheriff Department. The Sheriff Department building, built in 1912, is a one-story Classical Revival building with a pedimented entrance portico. It was designed by Augusta, Georgia, architect L.F. Goodrich.

The 1940 courthouse served as Emanuel County's justice building, replacing the 1920 courthouse that was destroyed in a 1938 fire. It was designed in Stripped Classical style by architects Dennis and Dennis. The courthouse was demolished in 2000, but a historical marker remains.
