= The Telegraph (Macon, Georgia) =

Newspaper in Macon, Georgia, United States

- The 2007-04-03 front page of The Telegraph
- Type: Daily newspaper
- Format: Broadsheet
- Owner: Georgia Trust for Local News
- Editor: Jeremy Chisenhall
- General manager: Blake Kaplan
- Founded: November 1, 1826; 199 years ago
- Language: English
- Headquarters: 1675 Montpelier Avenue; Macon, Georgia 31201-3444; United States
- Circulation: 13,235 Daily; 16,659 Sunday (as of 2020)
- ISSN: 1054-2485 (print); 2688-9048 (web)
- OCLC number: 1118694416
- Website: macon.com

The Telegraph, frequently called The Macon Telegraph, is the primary print news organ in Middle Georgia. It is the third-largest newspaper in the State of Georgia (after the Atlanta Journal-Constitution and Augusta Chronicle). Founded in 1826, The Telegraph has undergone several name changes, mergers, and publishers. As of July 2026, the paper is owned by the Georgia Trust for Local News.

== The Telegraph's Name Changes ==
The Telegraph's Name Changes from 1826–Present
Newspaper Name	Years	Owner(s)
Macon Telegraph	(1826–1832)	Myron Bartlett
Georgia Telegraph	(1832–1835)	C.E. & M. Bartlett
Macon Georgia Telegraph	(1836–1844)	M. & E.E. Bartlett
Georgia Telegraph	(1844–1858)	M. Bartlett
Weekly Georgia Telegraph	(1858–1869)	Joseph Clisby
Georgia Weekly Telegraph and Georgia Journal & Messenger	(1869–1880)	Clisby, Reid & Reese
Georgia Weekly Telegraph, Journal, & Messenger	(1880–188?)	Telegraph and Messenger Pub. Co.
Weekly Telegraph and Messenger	(188?–1885)	Telegraph and Messenger Pub. Co.
The Weekly Telegraph	(1885–1899)	Telegraph Pub. Co.
Twice-a-Week Telegraph	(1899–19??)	Macon Telegraph Pub. Co.
Macon Daily Telegraph	(1905–1926)	Macon Telegraph Pub. Co.
The Macon Telegraph	(19??–1940)	The Macon Telegraph Publishing Company
The Telegraph	(2005–present)	The McClatchy Company (2005–26) Georgia Trust for Local News (2026–present)

== History ==
=== Origins: 1826–1860 ===
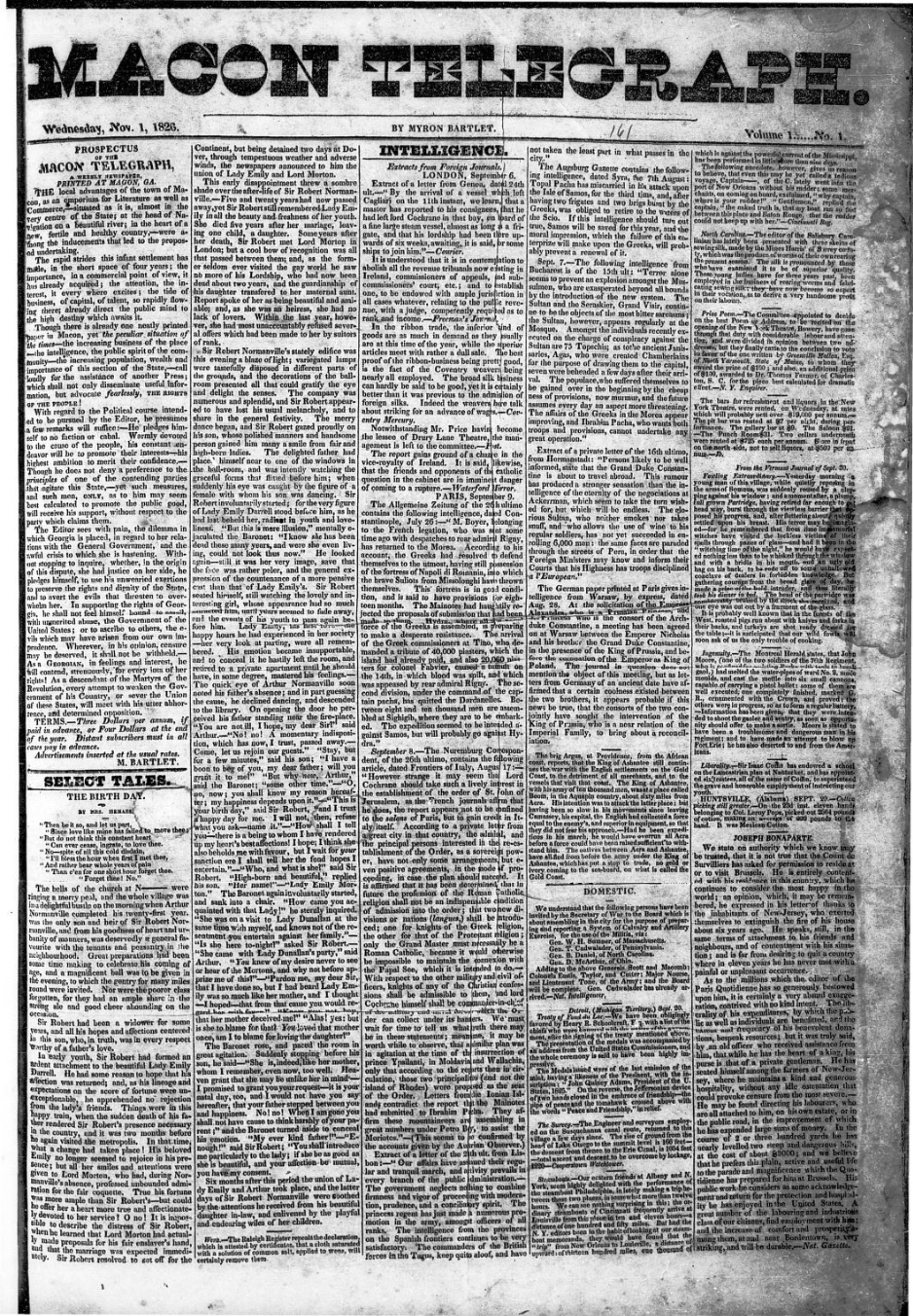
The Macon Telegraph's 1 Nov 1826 Edition

Dr. Myron Bartlett founded The Macon Telegraph and published its first edition on Wednesday, November 1, 1826, three years after the Georgia General Assembly chartered the city of Macon. In his "prospectus" on the front page of that November 1 edition, Bartlett said in part that the Telegraph would "not only disseminate useful information but advocate fearlessly "THE RIGHTS OF THE PEOPLE!" The newspaper ran weekly at first (Bartlett didn't begin publishing a daily until 1831). All the type was set by hand and it was a full-sheet affair. The columns were mostly short items copied from other newspapers.

By 1827, The Macon Telegraph was one out of 16 newspapers in Georgia, two of which ran in Macon, two in Savannah, four in Milledgeville, three in Augusta, one in Athens, one in Washington, one in Darien, and one in Mount Zion. The first daily Macon Telegraph, called Daily Macon Telegraph was printed Octember 17, 1831. It lasted a little more than a year before transforming into a semi-weekly that was re-named Georgia Telegraph.

The first cartoon in The Telegraph appeared in the September 22, 1840 edition.

An advertisement for the Macon Telegraph in Poe's directory of the city of Macon, 1887

On November 17, 1846, the Macon Telegraph announced that "all market quotations were being received by Magnetic Telegraph." A century later, the newspaper carried the following comment about The Telegraph "The magnetism of this new and time-saving invention had created a great deal of excitement and people everywhere were conjecturing as to what would be the benefits and final unbelievable accomplishments of Morse's find."

=== American Civil War: 1861–1865 ===
Macon Telegraph continued to print during the American Civil War, shrinking down to a single sheet in April 1863 until the end of the war due to a paper shortage.

On September 19, 1864, Clisby sold The Telegraph to Henry L. Flash, who consolidated The Daily Confederate (a newspaper founded in Macon in 1863) with The Telegraph. The new name of the paper was Macon Daily Telegraph and Confederate.

Joseph Clisby recorded in the Macon City Directory, 1860

On April 20, 1865, The Telegraph was temporarily suspended on account of the occupation of the city by the Federals. The editor fled his establishment and left it in charge of the printers, who did not attempt to bring out the regular editions, but two or three numbers of a small sheet called "The Daily News." The Augusta Chronicle and Sentinel had heard of Macon's occupation and, in the absence of the editors of 'The Telegraph and Confederate,' they took possession of the office and are issued a paper called The Daily News.

The Telegraph was resumed May 11 under the new ownership of Clayton and Dumble. The subscription rate fell from $120 a year to $12, even though the sheet was gotten out under the great difficulties. The Confederate ink and paper was used and it was practically impossible to issue a typographically neat page. On May 28, The Telegraph appeared in full four-sheet form and announced it would continue doing so until the resumption of mail service, when the full paper would be issued daily instead of Sundays only.

=== Pre-Anderson Era: 1866–1900 ===
In 1866, Clayton and Dumble sold the newspaper to William A. Reid. In 1869, The Journal and Messenger was amalgamated with The Telegraph under the name Telegraph and Messenger. It was the fifth paper The Telegraph absorbed since it was founded. Other papers include The Courier, Citizen, Republic and Confederate.

In 1873, the name of the paper was changed to the Daily Telegraph and Messenger. The word "messenger" was dropped from its name in 1885.

=== The Anderson Era: 1900s ===
By 1900, there were 24 daily newspapers in Georgia, six semi-weeklies, one bi-weekly, 29 monthlies and 274 weeklies.

In 1914, the Anderson brothers, William T. and Peyton T., purchased the paper. P.T. Anderson had started working in the circulation department in 1909. Under their leadership, the paper inaugurated a special page focusing on the black community. They also purchased The Macon News and combined some staff positions between the two papers. The News continued to publish in the afternoon, while The Telegraph remained the morning paper.

W.T. Anderson published and edited The Macon Telegraph until 1940. In 1946, P.T. Anderson's son, Peyton, took over the papers. He became known for giving his editors great freedom to report the facts, as well as being a "pillar of the community". He sold The Telegraph and News in 1969 to Knight Newspapers, and retired to oversee his investments. Following his death in 1988, the bulk of his fortune, approximately $35 million, was left in his will to start one of Macon's major charitable foundations, The Peyton Anderson Foundation.

=== Corporate ownership ===
The new ownership merged with Ridder Publications in 1974 to create Knight Ridder. At the same time, the Saturday editions of The Telegraph and News merged.

A new The Macon Telegraph and News was published as a morning paper seven days a week. During this era, Randall Savage and Jackie Crosby earned the paper its lone Pulitzer Prize to date in 1985 for an investigation into academic and athletics at the University of Georgia and the Georgia Institute of Technology.

The paper changed its name back to The Macon Telegraph in 1990, bringing over a century of The Macon News to an end.

=== Age of the internet: 2000s ===
In 2005, the name "Macon" was also dropped from the masthead, and the name of the newspaper became The Telegraph. The following year, Knight Ridder was sold to the McClatchy Company, bringing the newspaper under a new owner once again.

In June 2024, the newspaper announced it will reduce its number of print editions to two a week.

In July 2026, McClatchy sold the Columbus Ledger-Enquirer and The Macon Telegraph to the National Trust for Local News. Following the sale, The Macon Melody will be merged into the Telegraph

== Products ==
=== Print Newspaper ===
The newspaper is printed in broadsheet format. The Telegraph prices are: daily, $3 & Sunday, $5.99. Price includes sales tax at newsracks; may be higher outside Bibb & adjacent counties. The newspaper is cheaper for subscribers.

=== Website ===
The Telegraph's digital traffic saw an average of over five million page views in 2018. Digital-only subscriptions are available to readers for $15.99 per month. Educational subscriptions are available to students and educators at a discounted rate.

== Contributors ==
Contributors to the publication include notable writers, political activists and editors such as:

- Rob Redding

== See also ==
- List of newspapers in Georgia (U.S. state)

== Bibliography ==
- "About The Telegraph". The Telegraph. The McClatchy Company. 2020.
- Bartlett, Myron (November 1, 1826). "Macon Telegraph. (Macon, Ga.) 1826-1832, November 01, 1826, Image 1". Georgia Historic Newspapers. Digital Library of Georgia.
- Bartlett, Myron (October 3, 1832). "Georgia telegraph. (Macon, Ga.) 1832-1835". Georgia Historic Newspapers. C.E. & M. Bartlett.
- Bartlett, Myron (January 7, 1836). "Macon Georgia Telegraph. (Macon, Ga.) 1836-1844". Georgia Historic Newspapers. Digital Library of Georgia.
- Bartlett, Myron (July 2, 1844). "Georgia telegraph. (Macon, Ga.) 1844-1858". Georgia Historic Newspapers. M. Bartlett.
- Brantley, Dr. R.L. (November 25, 1926). "History of The Macon Telegraph". The Macon Telegraph (Macon, Ga.). p. 6.
- Clisby, Joseph (September 21, 1858). "Weekly Georgia telegraph. (Macon [Ga.]) 1858-1869". Georgia Historic Newspapers. Joseph Clisby.
- Corley, Laura (April 5, 2018). "Telegraph timeline". The Telegraph (Macon, Ga.). pp. 5A.
- Morris, Linda S. (November 7, 2013). "Telegraph to relocate its business operations". The Telegraph. The McClatchy Company.
- "Our Markets". Sacramento, California: McClatchy Company.
