= Leesburg High School (Leesburg, Georgia) =

- U.S. National Register of Historic Places
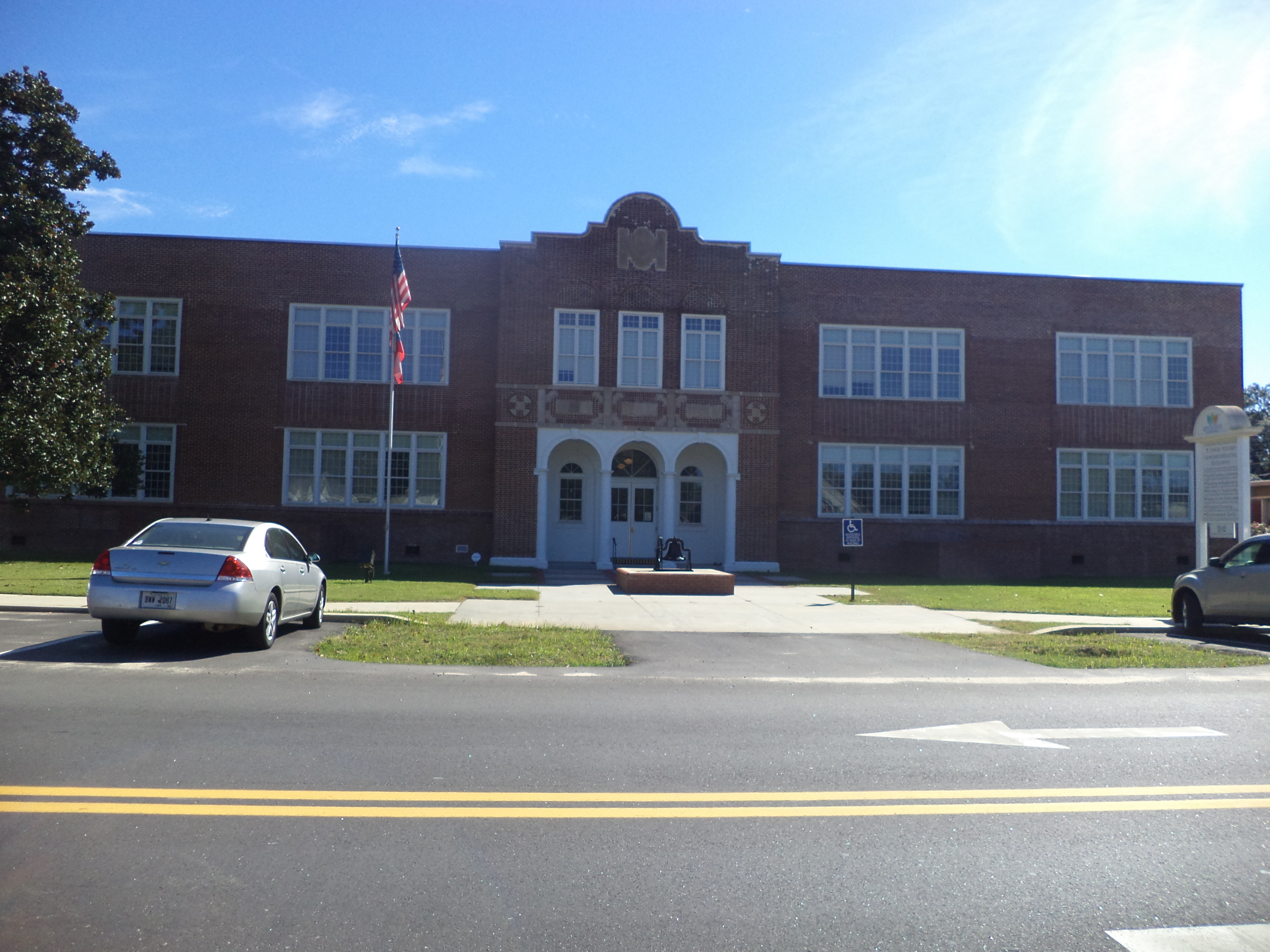

- Location within Georgia
- Location: 100 Starkville Ave., Leesburg, Georgia
- Coordinates: 31°43′54″N 84°10′3″W
- Area: 2.5 acres (1.0 ha)
- Built: 1922
- Built by: Ivey P. Crutchfield
- Architect: Dennis and Dennis
- Architectural style: Colonial Revival
- NRHP reference No.: 05001595
- Added to NRHP: February 1, 2006

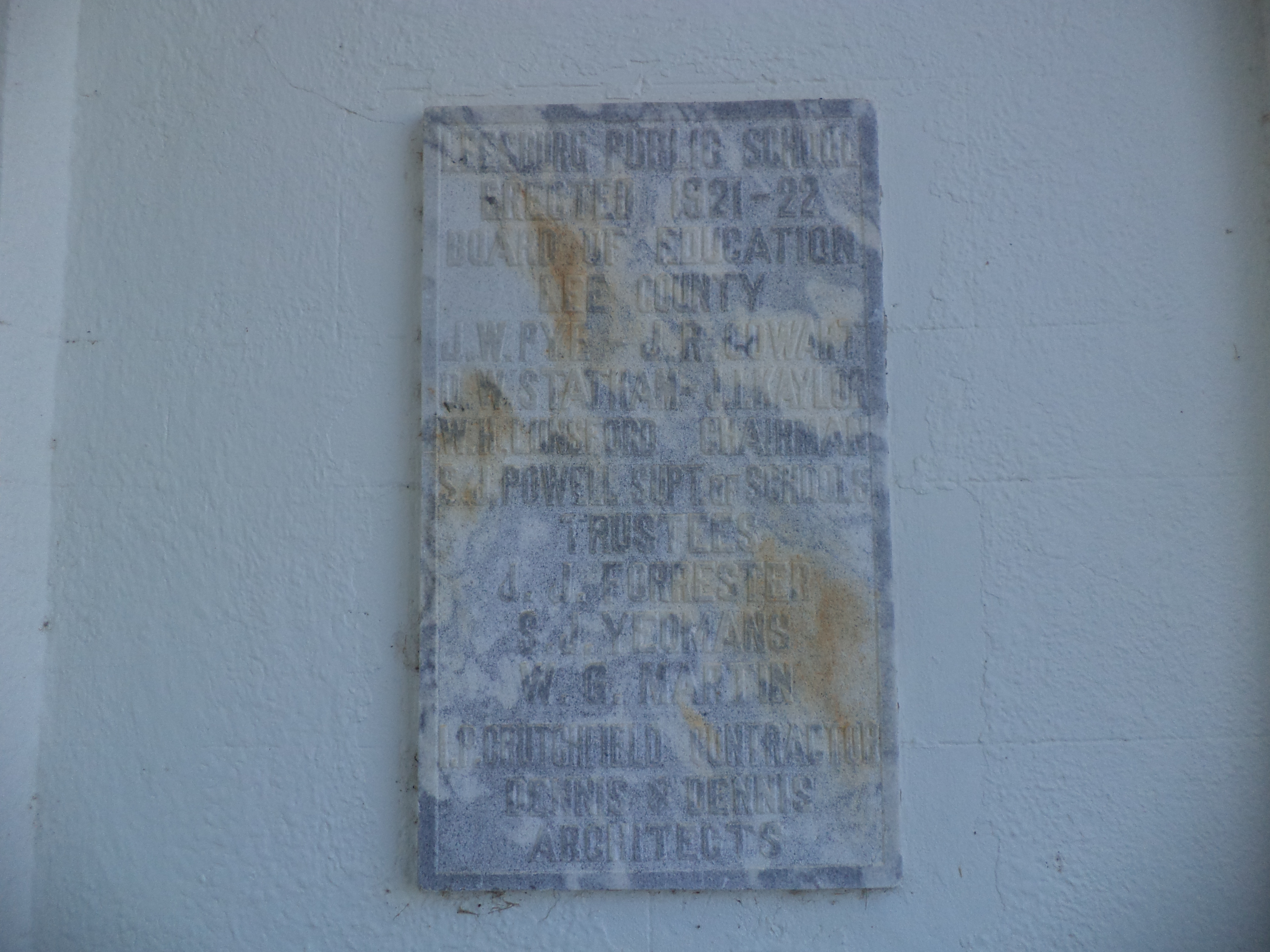
Lee County High School marker

Leesburg High School, also known as Lee County High School, is a historic high school in Leesburg, Georgia, United States. It was added to the National Register of Historic Places on February 1, 2006. It is located at 100 Starkville Avenue. The school's teams compete as the Trojans.

It is a two-story brick building designed by Macon architects Dennis and Dennis and built by contractor/architect I. P. Crutchfield.

== See also ==
- National Register of Historic Places listings in Lee County, Georgia
