= The Macon News =

American newspaper

- Our Beat Is the Heart of Georgia
- Type: Daily newspaper
- Format: Broadsheet
- Founders: Jerome B. Pound; Eugene Pound
- Founded: 1884; 142 years ago
- Ceased publication: September 2, 1983
- Headquarters: Cherry Street, Macon, Georgia
- Country: United States
- Sister newspapers: The Macon Telegraph
- OCLC number: 19872344

The Macon News was a newspaper in Georgia, United States that operated from 1884 to 1983.

== History ==
The Macon News was founded in 1884 and operated until September 2, 1983. The paper was printed Monday to Saturday under the initial ownership of brothers Jerome B. Pound and Eugene Pound. Subscription to the newspaper was US$5, half that of the rival paper The Macon Telegraph. The Macon News was printed and distributed in the evening.

The paper increased its page size in 1885 and operated from offices on Cherry Street, Macon.

In 1930, The Macon Telegraph owners brothers William T. and Peyton T. Anderson bought The Macon News for $200,000. They combined some staff roles, but kept both papers operating.

The paper's 1983 closure was a result of declining readership. Barbara Stinson was the managing editor at the time of the paper's closure; Ed Olson was the publisher and Billy Watson was the General Manager. The executive editor was Richard Thomas. After its closure, the paper merged with The Macon Telegraph.

The newspaper's OCLC number was 19872344.

== See also ==
- List of newspapers in Georgia (U.S. state)
