= Alexander Blair (architect) =

American architect

- Born: Alexander Blair III; April 22, 1867
- Died: November 16, 1931 (aged 64)
- Occupation: Architect
- Children: Algernon Blair

Alexander Blair III (April 22, 1867–November 16, 1931) was an American architect. He designed the Grand Opera House (1884) in Macon, Georgia, eight Georgia county courthouses, and other buildings. His father was also an architect and his son Algernon Blair (1873-1952) was a prominent builder.

By 1880 his family was living in Macon, Georgia.

== Works ==
- Decatur County Courthouse, Bainbridge, Georgia - the first courthouse he designed
- The Academy, now the Grand Opera House, Macon, Georgia, 621 Mulberry Street
- Telfair County Courthouse, McRae, Georgia (1906)
- Cairo, Georgia Depot (Atlantic Coast Line Railroad) (1905)
- Murray County Courthouse, Chatsworth, Georgia (1916)
- Turner County Courthouse, Ashburn, Georgia (1908) with Peter E. Dennis
- Wilkinson County Courthouse, Irwinton, Georgia (1924)
- Montgomery County Courthouse, Mount Vernon, Georgia (1907)
- Alexander Blair residence, Macon, Georgia
- Nicholas M. Block house, Macon, Georgia, on College Street
- Dr. Thomas N. Baker House, Macon, Georgia (1908) on Vineville Avenue
