= Sparta Ishmaelite =

Newspaper in Sparta, Georgia, US

The Sparta Ishmaelite is a newspaper in Sparta, Hancock County, Georgia. It is the legal organ of Hancock County. The Ishmaelite was published starting in January 1883. Its archives are on file at the University of Georgia Libraries.

In December 2023, The Sparta Ishmaelite was acquired by The Georgia Trust for Local News, an independent, nonprofit newspaper company.
