= Al Burruss =

American politician

Member of the Georgia House of Representatives
- In office 1964–1986

Personal details
- Born: July 3, 1927 Hopewell, Georgia, United States
- Died: May 10, 1986 (aged 58) Marietta, Georgia, United States
- Party: Democratic

A. L. "Al" Burruss (July 3, 1927 – May 10, 1986) was an American politician. Burruss was a member of the Democratic party. From 1964 to 1986, he was a member of the Georgia House of Representatives. Burruss was the House majority leader, or the ranking Democrat, from 1982 until his death in 1986 from pancreatic cancer.
