= Ward Edwards (politician) =

American politician (1930–2024)

Member of the Georgia House of Representatives from the 112th district
- In office 1967–1992

Personal details
- Born: February 28, 1930 Howard, Georgia, U.S.
- Died: March 24, 2024 (aged 94)
- Party: Democratic
- Spouse: Billie Salmon
- Profession: Funeral director

Ward J. Edwards (February 28, 1930 – March 24, 2024) was an American politician. He was a member of the Georgia House of Representatives from 1967 to 1993. He was a member of the Democratic Party.

Edwards died on March 24, 2024, at the age of 94.
