= Perry, Georgia =

- City
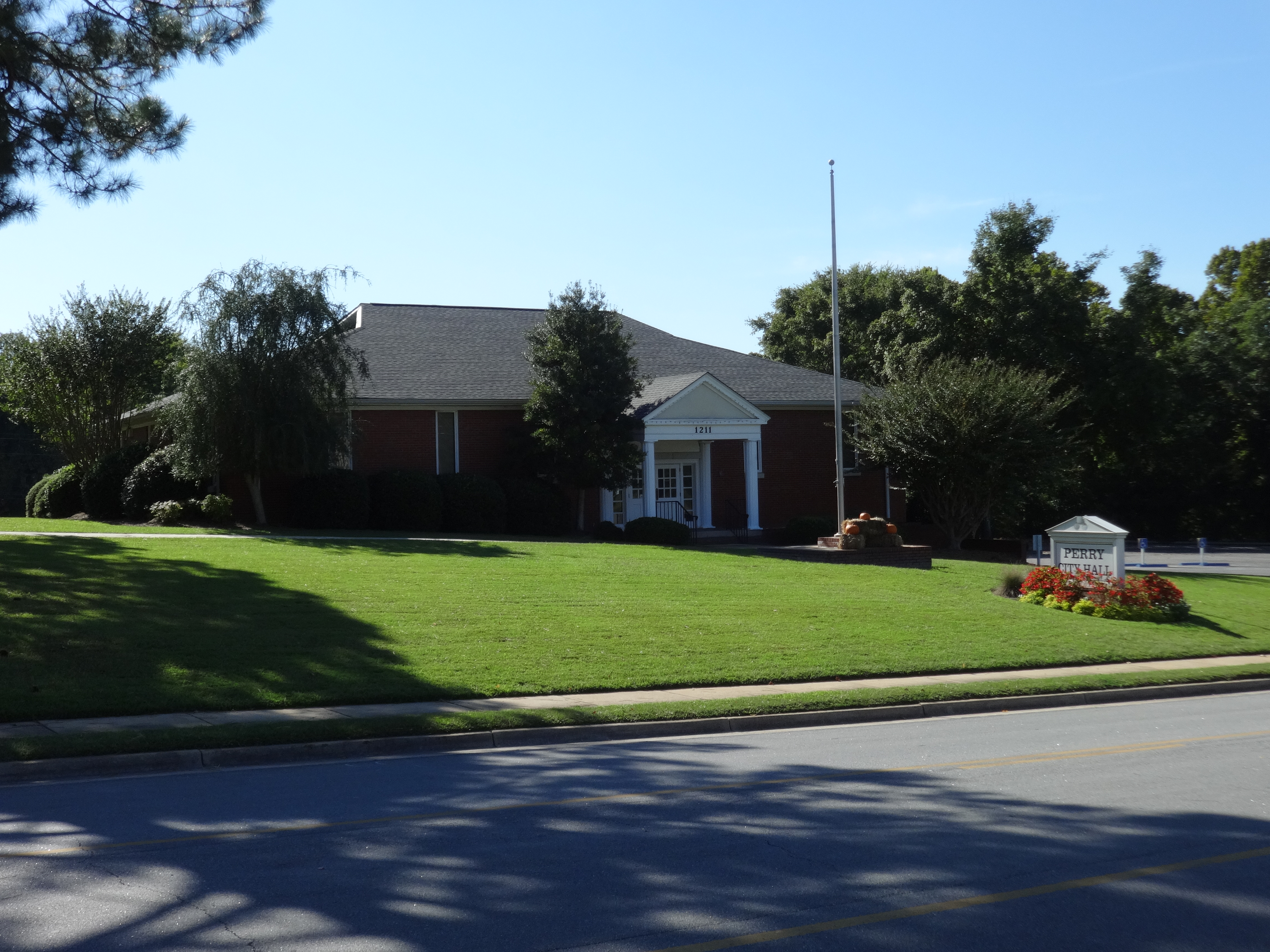
- Perry City Hall
- Motto: "Where Georgia comes together"
- Location in Houston County and the state of Georgia
- Coordinates: 32°27′54″N 83°43′16″W
- Country: United States
- State: Georgia
- Counties: Houston, Peach
- Named for: Oliver Hazard Perry

Government
  - Mayor: Randall Walker
  - City Manager: Robert Smith

Area
  - Total: 27.10 sq mi (70.20 km^{2})
  - Land: 26.98 sq mi (69.87 km^{2})
  - Water: 0.13 sq mi (0.34 km^{2})
- Elevation: 364 ft (111 m)

Population (2020)
  - Total: 20,624
  - Density: 764.5/sq mi (295.19/km^{2})
- Time zone: UTC-5 (EST)
  - Summer (DST): UTC-4 (EDT)
- ZIP code: 31069
- Area code: 478
- FIPS code: 13-60340
- GNIS feature ID: 0320389
- Website: perry-ga.gov, perryga.com

Perry is a city in Houston and Peach Counties in the U.S. state of Georgia. It is the county seat of Houston County. As of the 2020 census, Perry had a population of 20,624. An estimate in 2019 put the population at 17,894. It is part of the Warner Robins, Georgia metropolitan statistical area, within the Macon–Bibb County–Warner Robins combined statistical area.

Perry is best known as the location of the annual Georgia National Fair.

== History ==
Founded in 1823 as Wattsville, the town was located near the center of Houston County and served as its courthouse. The name was soon changed to honor Commodore Oliver Hazard Perry, a hero of the War of 1812. The Georgia General Assembly incorporated the town on December 9, 1824. The original city limit was a circle, one mile in diameter, except where bounded on the north by Big Indian Creek.

Antebellum industry in Perry included gristmills, sawmills, and cotton gins. The Houston Home Journal began publishing in 1870. Cotton was the most significant commodity crop in the 20th century.

Tourism has been important to the local economy since about 1920, when U.S. Highway 41 to Florida was paved. The New Perry Hotel, built in 1870 and rebuilt in 1925, became a landmark for many Florida tourists. The hotel was demolished on July 22, 2024, due to its irreparable condition. The downtown area has emphasized its historic heritage and has several quaint shops and restaurants.

Since World War II, when Robins Air Force Base was established in nearby Warner Robins, the military has been a significant employer in the area. Warner Robins is several times larger than Perry. Other manufacturers in the city have included Frito-Lay, Perdue Farms (formally Heileman Brewing Co.), and Cemex, Inc. (formally Penn-Dixie Cement and Medusa Cement Company).

In the early 1960s Interstate 75 was constructed through the western side of the city. It has attracted more businesses that cater to travelers. The Georgia National Fairgrounds and Agricenter opened in 1990. The Go Fish Georgia Education Center opened in early October 2010.

Mayors
Name	Term of Office
C. E. Brunson	1924–1929
W. E. Swanson	1930–1934
A. M. Anderson	1934–1938
Sam A. Nunn, Sr.	1938–1945
Geo. F. Nunn	1946–1947
Chas P. Gray	1948–1949
Mayo Davis	1950–1953
Stanley E. Smith, Jr.	1954–1959
Milton Beckham	1960–1963
Richard B. Ray	1964–1969
J. Malcolm Reese	1970–1972
John W. Barton, Jr.	1972–1974
James O. McKinley	1974–1980
Barbara C. Calhoun	1980–1984
Lewis M. Meeks	1985–1988
James E. Worrall	1989–2009
James E. Faircloth, Jr.	2010–2019
Randall Walker	2019—

== Geography ==
Perry is located in west-central Houston County. The city limits extend northwest into Peach County. It is on Big Indian Creek, a tributary of the Ocmulgee River.

According to the United States Census Bureau, Perry has a total area of 26.3 square miles (68.1 km^{2}), of which 26.2 square miles (67.8 km^{2}) are land and 0.1 square miles (0.3 km^{2}), or 0.48%, are water.

== Demographics ==
Historical population
Census	Pop.	Note	%±
1870	836		—
1880	929		11.1%
1890	665		−28.4%
1900	650		−2.3%
1910	649		−0.2%
1920	678		4.5%
1930	1,398		106.2%
1940	1,542		10.3%
1950	3,849		149.6%
1960	6,032		56.7%
1970	7,771		28.8%
1980	9,453		21.6%
1990	9,452		0.0%
2000	9,602		1.6%
2010	13,839		44.1%
2020	20,624		49.0%
2025 (est.)	25,699	▲	24.6%
U.S. Decennial Census; 2025

=== 2020 census ===
As of the 2020 census, Perry had a population of 20,624, with 7,685 households and 4,160 families. The median age was 34.4 years; 27.2% of residents were under the age of 18 and 13.6% were 65 years of age or older. For every 100 females there were 91.4 males, and for every 100 females age 18 and over there were 87.5 males age 18 and over.

93.6% of residents lived in urban areas, while 6.4% lived in rural areas.

There were 7,685 households in Perry, of which 39.7% had children under the age of 18 living in them. Of all households, 45.7% were married-couple households, 16.1% were households with a male householder and no spouse or partner present, and 32.4% were households with a female householder and no spouse or partner present. About 27.1% of all households were made up of individuals and 10.9% had someone living alone who was 65 years of age or older.

There were 8,170 housing units, of which 5.9% were vacant. The homeowner vacancy rate was 2.2% and the rental vacancy rate was 5.6%.

Racial composition as of the 2020 census
Race	Num.	Perc.
White	11,391	55.2%
Black or African American	7,206	34.9%
American Indian and Alaska Native	46	0.2%
Asian	405	2.0%
Native Hawaiian and Other Pacific Islander	20	0.1%
Some other race	336	1.6%
Two or more races	1,220	5.9%
Hispanic or Latino (of any race)	987	4.8%

=== 2019 estimate ===
Circa 2019, of the 13,839 residents, 13,776 of them were in Houston County and 63 were in Peach County.

== Arts and culture ==
The Georgia National Fair is a state-sponsored fair each October at the Georgia National Fairgrounds and Agricenter in Perry. The 11-day event features agricultural shows, competitions, and midway rides.

The Go Fish Education Center features aquatic wildlife, and is associated with the Georgia Department of Natural Resources.

The Perry Area Historical Museum features regional historical artifacts.

The Dogwood Festival features a pageant, run, and vendors.

== Education ==
Areas in Houston County are within the Houston County School System (as are all other parts of Houston County).

Areas in Peach County are within the Peach County School District (as are all other parts of Peach County).

== Infrastructure ==
=== Transportation ===
Highways include US 41, I-75, US 341.

Perry-Houston County Airport is a general aviation airport located in the city.

== Notable people ==
- Alice Culler Cobb (1843–1918), educator, missionary
- Kanorris Davis, former Troy University Trojans linebacker and NFL New England Patriots safety/linebacker, currently a free agent
- Ernest Greene, chillwave musician, known by his stage name Washed Out
- Casey Hayward, cornerback for the Atlanta Falcons, and former Las Vegas Raiders, Los Angeles Chargers, Green Bay Packers, and Vanderbilt University football player
- Courtney Hodges, General and commander of the First United States Army during World War II
- Willis Hunt, senior federal judge
- Michelle Nunn, born and partly raised there, CEO of Points of Light and candidate for U.S. Senate; daughter of Sam Nunn, Jr.
- Sam Nunn, former United States Senator; son of Sam Nunn, Sr., a mayor of Perry
- Admiral James Harrison Oliver, Director of Navy Intelligence during World War I, appointed by President Woodrow Wilson to be the first governor of the Virgin Islands
- Sonny Perdue, United States Secretary of Agriculture and former Governor of Georgia
- Richard Ray, former United States Representative.
- Deborah Roberts, correspondent for ABC News
- Ron Simmons, WCW/WWE wrestler and former Florida State Seminoles football player
- Dontarrious Thomas, former linebacker for the San Francisco 49ers also the Minnesota Vikings and former Auburn University Tigers football player.
- Al Thornton, former NBA player for Los Angeles Clippers, Washington Wizards, also the Golden State Warriors and former Florida State Seminoles basketball standout.
