= National Register of Historic Places listings in Peach County, Georgia =

This is a list of properties and districts in Peach County, Georgia that are listed on the National Register of Historic Places (NRHP).

This National Park Service list is complete through NPS recent listings posted March 21, 2025.

== Current listings ==
| | Name on the Register | Image | Date listed | Location | City or town | Description |
|---|---|---|---|---|---|---|
| 1 | Byron Historic District | | June 20, 1995 (#95000739) | Roughly, along the Central GA RR tracks from Jackson St. to Vinson St. including Boulevard, Main, Church and Academy Sts; 32°39′15″N 83°45′34″W | Byron | |
| 2 | Everett Square Historic District | Everett Square Historic District | December 30, 1994 (#94001493) | Roughly bounded by Knoxville, Vineville, Anderson, and Macon Sts. and the Central of Georgia RR tracks 32°33′15″N 83°53′29″W | Fort Valley | |
| 3 | James A. Everett House | James A. Everett House | December 10, 1992 (#92001674) | 220 Northwoods Dr. 32°35′48″N 83°53′30″W | Fort Valley | |
| 4 | Fort Valley Downtown and Railroad Historic District | Fort Valley Downtown and Railroad Historic District | August 12, 2010 (#10000549) | Centered around SR 49, Main St., Church St., and the railroad line 32°33′12″N 83°53′07″W | Fort Valley | |
| 5 | Fort Valley State College Historic District | Fort Valley State College Historic District | April 21, 2000 (#00000390) | Pear St. and State University Dr. 32°32′20″N 83°53′48″W | Fort Valley | Huntington Hall at Fort Valley State University |
| 6 | Henry Alexander Hunt High School Gymnasium | | August 9, 2021 (#100006788) | 600 Spruce St. 32°32′45″N 83°53′06″W | Fort Valley | |
| 7 | Peach County Courthouse | Peach County Courthouse | September 18, 1980 (#80001219) | Off GA 49; 32°33′12″N 83°53′17″W | Fort Valley | |
| 8 | Strother's Farm | Strother's Farm | November 25, 1980 (#80004448) | Rt. 3; 32°29′17″N 83°55′33″W | Fort Valley | |
