= Peach County High School =

Public high school in Fort Valley, Georgia, United States

Location
- 3665 Peach Parkway; Fort Valley postal address, Georgia 31030-3699; United States; 32.591314°N 83.839182°W

Information
- School type: Public high school
- Denomination: Peach County School District
- Established: Fort Valley High School 1927-1970; Peach County High School 1970-present
- Superintendent: Lionel Brown
- Principal: Dr. Jesse Davis
- Teaching staff: 68.80 FTE
- Grades: 9–12
- Gender: Co-ed
- Enrollment: 1,166 (2023–2024)
- Student to teacher ratio: 16.95
- Colors: Black and gold
- Sports: Football, basketball, baseball, softball, cross-country, track and field, golf, tennis, soccer, volleyball, Esports
- Mascot: Trojan
- Accreditation: Southern Association of Colleges and Schools
- Website: Peach County High School

Peach County High School is a public high school located in unincorporated Peach County, Georgia, United States, with a Fort Valley postal address. The school is part of the Peach County School District, which serves all of Peach County.

Peach County High School (PCHS) is accredited by the Southern Association of Colleges and Schools (SACS) and the Georgia State Department of Education’s Professional Standards Commission. PCHS is also a member of the "High Schools That Work" division of the Southern Regional Education Board and a member of the National Alliance of High Schools.

== History ==
Prior to Integration, black students attending public school in Peach County attended Henry A. Hunt High School (the athletic mascot of this school was the Tiger) and white students attended Fort Valley High School (the mascot of this school was the Green Wave). Like many locations in the southern United States, Peach County did not immediately comply with the federal order to integrate schools. H. A. Hunt High School specifically educated Black Americans during a time when formal education for black students was virtually non-existent in Peach County. Hunt High was named for the Mr. Henry A. Hunt, second principal of Fort Valley High and Industrial School (later Fort Valley State University).

Peach County High School was created in 1970 as a merger of those two schools. A single unified set of athletic teams were created. The trojan became the mascot of the combined school. A school facility was established in 1974.

Old School Building

Following integration, students continued to attend separate schools, but under a policy of busing. In a 1970 report to the United States Senate, Peach County was listed as being in questionable violation of the federal order to integrate schools. In 1974, with the construction of the present campus, both black and white students attended a fully integrated school.

School Prom Integration

In the early 1960s the Peach County School Board discontinued school-sanctioned social activities to include proms and homecoming dances on the recommendation of then superintendent Ernest Anderson, who served from 1945 to 1984. Anderson argued such activities interfered with the students' studies. After Peach County schools were formally integrated, parents continued to sponsor private segregated proms for students. This changed in 1990 after parents convinced the school board to rescind the policy and allow for a single, school sanctioned prom.

New School Building

In September 2019, the school board announced the construction of a new high school. The new school was planned to be located between the cities of Fort Valley and Byron, Georgia. As of May 2022 the new Peach County High School has been opened.

== Campus ==
A school store opened in 2021, staffed by students.

== Athletics ==
PCHS athletics are most widely known for having one of the most consistently successful football teams in the state of Georgia. The Peach County Trojans have fielded a winning team each year since 1987 (33 consecutive seasons) and has been in the playoffs each season since 1991 (29 consecutive seasons). The Trojans have won three Georgia High School Association (GHSA) Class AAA state championships, in 2005, 2006, 2009. and has been the Class AAA State-Runner Up in 1992, 1998, 2003, 2011, 2012, 2017*, 2018.

2017 State Championship Game Controversy vs. Calhoun High School (GA) Yellow Jackets

With Peach County trailing 6-10 with 3:33 remaining on the Calhoun 21-yard line, Peach County's running back Noah Whittington caught a pass on fourth-and-8 from quarterback Antonio Gilbert at the 5-yard line. Whittington took at least two full steps and dove toward the end zone, spreading his arm with the ball across the goal line. As his arm and the ball landed in the end zone, the ball came free. The official, instead of signalling touchdown or calling the runner down, ruled the pass as incomplete. The missed scoring opportunity in a defensive game proved to be the difference as Peach County would not score on their final possession and Calhoun would win the game 10-6. The ruling of incomplete has been considered as one of the most controversial calls in GHSA state title game history, with many calling for use of instant replay in state championship games. The following spring, the GHSA added a seventh official to aid in championship games.

== Notable alumni ==
- Ed Beck - Basketball player for University of Kentucky
- Alfred A. Conteh - Sculptor, painter and mixed-media artist
- Antone Davis - NFL offensive lineman with Philadelphia Eagles and Atlanta Falcons.
- Jacquez Green - NFL wide receiver with Tampa Bay Buccaneers and Washington Redskins; Winner of 2001 and 2002 Madden Bowl
- Alvin Holsey - United States Navy Rear Admiral and Current Deputy Chief of Naval Personnel
- Louis Ivory - Winner of 2000 Walter Payton Award for the most outstanding player in NCAA Division I-AA
- Pete Johnson - NFL running back with Cincinnati Bengals, San Diego Chargers, and Miami Dolphins
- Greg Lloyd - NFL linebacker with Pittsburgh Steelers and Carolina Panthers.
- Dannie Lockett - NFL Europe linebacker with London Monarchs; NFL linebacker with Detroit Lions
- Randy McMichael - NFL tight end with Miami Dolphins, St. Louis Rams, and San Diego Chargers.
- Demarcus Robinson - NFL wide receiver with Kansas City Chiefs and Baltimore Ravens
- Marcus Robinson - NFL Europe wide receiver with Rhein Fire; NFL wide receiver with Chicago Bears, Minnesota Vikings, Detroit Lions, and Baltimore Ravens
- Tim Watson - NFL safety with Green Bay Packers and Kansas City Chiefs
- Noah Whittington - college football running back for the Oregon Ducks
