= 1970 Georgia 500 =

Auto race held at Middle Georgia Raceway in 1970

Race details
- Race 46 of 48 in the 1970 NASCAR Grand National Series season
- Date: November 8, 1970; 54 years ago
- Official name: Georgia 250
- Location: Middle Georgia Raceway, Byron, Georgia
- Course: Permanent racing facility
- Course length: 0.882 km (0.548 miles)
- Distance: 500 laps, 227 mi (441 km)
- Weather: Temperatures reaching of 73.9 °F (23.3 °C); wind speeds of 6 miles per hour (9.7 km/h)
- Average speed: 83.284 miles per hour (134.033 km/h)
- Attendance: 6,500

Pole position
Driver	Richard Petty	Petty Enterprises

Most laps led
Driver	Bobby Isaac	K&K Insurance Racing
- Laps: 226

Winner
No. 43	Richard Petty	Petty Enterprises

Television in the United States
- Network: untelevised
- Announcers: none

The 1970 Georgia 500 was a NASCAR Grand National Series event that was held on November 8, 1970, at Middle Georgia Raceway in Byron, Georgia.

NASCAR officials would record four engine-related incidents, one major fire, two issues related to the vehicle's suspension and an oil leak.

== Race report ==
The race car drivers still had to commute to the races using the same stock cars that competed in a typical weekend's race through a policy of homologation (and under their own power). This policy was in effect until roughly 1975. By 1980, NASCAR had completely stopped tracking the year model of all the vehicles and most teams did not take stock cars to the track under their own power anymore.

Five hundred laps took place on a paved oval track spanning .548 miles (0.882 km) for a grand total of 274.0 miles (441.0 km). The race took three hours, thirteen minutes, and thirty-three seconds to reach its conclusion; Richard Petty (racing for Petty Enterprises) defeated Bobby Isaac in fourteen seconds. The pole position speed was 94.064 miles per hour (151.381 km/h); accomplished by Richard Petty. Total winnings for this race were $20,000 ($161,937 when considering inflation) with the winner receiving most of $3,275 ($26,517 when considering inflation). This event would be the first of two career starts for Jimmy Watson. Notable crew chiefs for this race included Harry Hyde, Dale Inman and Lee Gordon.

Petty's wins in 1970 came at 18 different tracks. He didn't have any sweeps.

This would be the final career start for Lee Roy Carrigg; whose NASCAR Winston Cup Series race spanned nine races and 1002 laps of racing action.

Earlier that year, the second annual Atlanta International Pop Festival was held in the same venue as this racing event. Jimi Hendrix and the Allman Brothers Band performed in front of 300,000 concertgoers; the town had a population of about 2,000.

In comparison to this summer musical festival that took place from July 3–5, this autumn racing event only attracted 6500 people in order to see stock car vehicles travel at speeds averaging 83.284 miles per hour or 134.033 kilometres per hour throughout the entire event.

=== Qualifying ===
Grid	No.	Driver	Manufacturer	Owner
1	43	Richard Petty	'70 Plymouth	Petty Enterprises
2	22	Bobby Allison	'69 Dodge	Bobby Allison
3	72	Benny Parsons	'69 Ford	L.G. DeWitt
4	32	Dick Brooks	'69 Plymouth	Dick Brooks
5	71	Bobby Isaac	'70 Dodge	Nord Krauskopf
6	06	Neil Castles	'69 Dodge	Neil Castles
7	4	John Sears	'69 Dodge	John Sears
8	48	James Hylton	'70 Ford	James Hylton
9	64	Elmo Langley	'69 Ford	Elmo Langley
10	26	Dave Marcis	'69 Ford	Earl Brooks
11	25	Jabe Thomas	'69 Plymouth	Don Robertson
12	79	Frank Warren	'69 Plymouth	Frank Warren
13	10	Bill Champion	'69 Ford	Bill Champion
14	8	Joe Frasson	'69 Ford	Ed Negre
15	67	Dick May	'69 Ford	Ron Ronacher
16	24	Cecil Gordon	'68 Ford	Cecil Gordon
17	54	Bill Dennis	'69 Chevrolet	Bill Dennis
18	68	Larry Baumel	'69 Ford	Allan Schulauer
19	93	Morgan Shepherd	'69 Chevrolet	Bill Flowers
20	02	E.J. Trivette	'69 Chevrolet	Crawford Brothers
21	76	Ben Arnold	'69 Ford	Ben Arnold
22	34	Wendell Scott	'69 Ford	Wendell Scott
23	77	Roy Mayne	'69 Ford	Bob Freeman
24	19	Henley Gray	'69 Ford	Henley Gray
25	58	Jim Vandiver	'70 Chevrolet	Bub Strickler
26	89	Rod Eulenfield	'69 Ford	Morris Davis
27	16	Jimmy Watson	'70 Chevrolet	Ken Spires
28	74	Bill Shirey	'69 Plymouth	Bill Shirey
29	39	Friday Hassler	'69 Chevrolet	James Hanley
30	87	Lee Roy Carrigg	'68 Ford	John Pemberton

=== Finishing order ===
Section reference:

1. Richard Petty (No. 43)
2. Bobby Isaac† (No. 71)
3. Dick Brooks† (No. 32)
4. Bobby Allison (No. 22)
5. John Sears† (No. 4)
6. James Hylton† (No. 48)
7. Benny Parsons† (No. 72)
8. Elmo Langley† (No. 64)
9. Jabe Thomas (No. 25)
10. Cecil Gordon† (No. 24)
11. Neil Castles (No. 06)
12. Ben Arnold (No. 76)
13. Bill Champion† (No. 10)
14. Jimmy Watson (No. 16)
15. Friday Hassler† (No. 39)
16. Henley Gray (No. 19)
17. Bill Shirey (No. 74)
18. Roy Mayne*† (No. 77)
19. Jim Vandiver* (No. 58)
20. Morgan Shepherd* (No. 93)
21. Wendell Scott*† (No. 34)
22. Joe Frasson*† (No. 8)
23. Lee Roy Carrigg* (No. 87)
24. Dave Marcis* (No. 26)
25. Bill Dennis* (No. 54)
26. Rod Eulenfield* (No. 89)
27. Frank Warren* (No. 79)
28. E.J. Trivette* (No. 02)
29. Dick May*† (No. 67)
30. Larry Baumel* (No. 68)

* Driver failed to finish race
† signifies that the driver is known to be deceased

== Timeline ==
Section reference:

- Start: Richard Petty was leading the starting grid as the green flag was waved.
- Lap 4: Larry Baumel's vehicle developed engine problems.
- Lap 37: Dick Brooks took over the lead from Richard Petty.
- Lap 54: Dick May's vehicle developed problems with its suspension.
- Lap 68: E.J. Trivette managed to lose the rear end of his vehicle.
- Lap 78: Frank Warren's vehicle developed problems with its suspension.
- Lap 80: Rod Eulenfeld's vehicle caught on fire due to the high speeds.
- Lap 85: Richard Petty took over the lead from Dick Brooks.
- Lap 86: Dick Brooks took over the lead from Richard Petty.
- Lap 105: Bill Dennis' vehicle developed problems with its ignition.
- Lap 131: Dave Marcis' vehicle developed engine problems.
- Lap 139: Bobby Isaac took over the lead from Dick Brooks.
- Lap 141: Dick Brooks took over the lead from Bobby Isaac.
- Lap 173: Bobby Allison took over the lead from Dick Brooks.
- Lap 181: Lee Roy Carrig's vehicle developed engine problems.
- Lap 201: Bobby Isaac took over the lead from Bobby Allison.
- Lap 223: Oil started leaking out of Joe Frasson's vehicle; knocking him out the race.
- Lap 265: Wendell Scott's vehicle developed engine problems.
- Lap 285: Jim Vandiver managed to lose the rear end of his vehicle.
- Lap 404: Richard Petty took over the lead from Bobby Isaac.
- Lap 405: Roy Mayne's vehicle developed engine problems.
- Lap 411: Bobby Isaac took over the lead from Richard Petty.
- Lap 413: Richard Petty took over the lead from Bobby Isaac.
- Lap 426: Bobby Isaac took over the lead from Richard Petty.
- Lap 445: Richard Petty took over the lead from Bobby Isaac.
- Finish: Richard Petty was officially declared the winner of the race.

Preceded by 1970 Old Dominion 500	NASCAR Grand National Races; 1970	Succeeded by 1970 American 500

Preceded by 1970 Old Dominion 500	Richard Petty's Career Wins; 1960-1984	Succeeded by 1971 Daytona 500

Preceded by November 1969	Georgia 500 races 1970	Succeeded by 1971
