= 1969 Georgia 500 =

1969 Georgia 500 may refer to:

- 1969 Georgia 500 (November 1968), a NASCAR race on November 17, 1968
- 1969 Georgia 500 (November 1969), a NASCAR race on November 9, 1969
