= 1971 Georgia 500 =

Auto race held at Middle Georgia Raceway in 1971

Race details
- Race 45 of 48 in the 1971 NASCAR Winston Cup Series season
- Date: November 7, 1971; 53 years ago
- Official name: Georgia 250
- Location: Middle Georgia Raceway, Byron, Georgia
- Course: Permanent racing facility
- Course length: 0.882 km (0.548 miles)
- Distance: 500 laps, 227 mi (441 km)
- Weather: Mild with temperatures of 70 °F (21 °C); wind speeds of 18.1 miles per hour (29.1 km/h)
- Average speed: 80.859 miles per hour (130.130 km/h)
- Attendance: 7,300

Pole position
Driver	Bobby Allison	Holman Moody

Most laps led
Driver	Bobby Allison	Holman Moody
- Laps: 418

Winner
No. 12	Bobby Allison	Holman Moody

Television in the United States
- Network: untelevised
- Announcers: none

The 1971 Georgia 500 was a NASCAR Winston Cup Series racing event that occurred on November 7, 1971, at Middle Georgia Raceway in Byron, Georgia, United States.

The race car drivers still had to commute to the races using the same stock cars that competed in a typical weekend's race through a policy of homologation (and under their own power). This policy was in effect until roughly 1975. By 1980, NASCAR had completely stopped tracking the year model of all the vehicles and most teams did not take stock cars to the track under their own power anymore.

== Race report ==
Friday Hassler, Bobby Allison, Jim Paschal, and Tiny Lund would fight for the first-place position in this race; with Allison leading the most laps. Bobby Allison would go on to defeat Tiny Lund by a margin of one lap after more than three hours and twenty minutes of racing. Bill Dennis's last-place finish would occur on the first lap in this 500-lap regulation event due to problems with his driveshaft. Friday Hassler had a great run, leading 12 laps early on the way to a third-place finish.

This was a combination race with the Grand American series. Tiny Lund was the best finishing pony car in 2nd, 1 lap down in his Camaro. The other Grand Am drivers were Ernie Shaw, Frank Sessions, Wayne Andrews, Joe Dean Huss, Buck Baker, Randy Hutchinson, H.B. Bailey, Jim Paschal, Bob Williams, & David Ray Boggs.

There were 32 drivers on the grid; all of them were born in the United States of America. Allison would qualify for the pole position with a top speed of 95.334 miles per hour (153.425 km/h) and set the pace for the entire event averaging speeds up to 80.859 miles per hour (130.130 km/h) to excite the 7,300 live audience members who attended this historic event. NASCAR officials gave out seven caution flags for 44 laps; one of them was related to the Walter Ballard crash on lap 455.

Vic Ballard and Junie Donlavey were the most notable crew chiefs to actively participate in this race.

Engine problems would retire some drivers out of the race in addition to clutch problems and troubles with managing the transmission, the suspension, and the alternator. Manufacturers that are hard to find today like the AMC Javelin, the Pontiac Firebird, and the Camaro once competed alongside "plain Jane" Chevrolet, Ford, and Dodge vehicles.

Jimmy Watson would never compete in a NASCAR Cup Series race after this event while Bob Williams would make his introduction into professional stock car racing here. Individual winnings for this event ranged from a handsome $3,275 ($25,428 when considering inflation) to a meager $350 ($2,717 when considering inflation).

Until the Pontiac Excitement 400 in 1989, this marked the last time that Richard Petty failed to make the starting grid of a Cup race.

=== Qualifying ===
Grid	No.	Driver	Manufacturer
1	12	Bobby Allison	'71 Ford
2	39	Friday Hassler	'70 Chevrolet
3	14	Jim Paschal	'70 Javelin
4	55	Tiny Lund	'70 Camaro
5	32	Dick Brooks	'70 Plymouth
6	25	Jabe Thomas	'70 Plymouth
7	36	H.B. Bailey	'71 Firebird
8	4	John Sears	'69 Dodge
9	15	Wayne Andrews	'71 Mustang
10	90	Bill Dennis	'69 Mercury
11	10	Bill Champion	'71 Ford
12	06	Neil Castles	'70 Dodge
13	30	Walter Ballard	'71 Ford
14	21	Frank Sessoms	'68 Camaro
15	79	Frank Warren	'69 Plymouth
16	05	David Sisco	'71 Chevrolet
17	8	Ed Negre	'69 Ford
18	33	Joe Dean Huss	'69 Camaro
19	01	Earle Canavan	'71 Plymouth
20	22	Randy Hutchinson	'69 Camaro
21	70	J.D. McDuffie	'71 Chevrolet
22	51	Dub Simpson	'69 Chevrolet
23	45	Bill Seifert	'69 Ford
24	87	Buck Baker	'71 Firebird
25	19	Henley Gray	'69 Ford

== Finishing order ==
1. Bobby Allison
2. Tiny Lund
3. Friday Hassler
4. Neil Castles
5. Bill Champion
6. Earl Brooks
7. J.D. McDuffie
8. Ernie Shaw
9. Frank Sessoms
10. Frank Warren
11. Jabe Thomas
12. Walter Ballard
13. Wayne Andrews
14. Wendell Scott
15. David Sisco
16. Joe Dean Huss
17. John Sears
18. Buck Baker
19. Randy Hutchison
20. Dick Brooks
21. Ed Negre
22. H.B. Bailey
23. G.C. Spencer
24. Jim Paschal
25. Bill Seifert
26. Bob Williams
27. Henley Gray
28. David Ray Boggs
29. Dub Simpson
30. Earle Canavan
31. Jimmy Watson
32. Bill Dennis

Preceded by 1971 American 500	NASCAR Winston Cup Series Races; 1971	Succeeded by 1971 Capital City 500

Preceded by 1970	Georgia 500 races 1971	Succeeded by none
