= Alfred Conteh =

Alfred Conteh may refer to:

- Alfred Amadu Conteh (born 1975), African American sculptor, painter and artist
- Alfred Paolo Conteh, Sierra Leone Armed Forces officer and Defense Minister of Sierra Leone
