= 1969 Georgia 500 (November 1969) =

Auto race held at Middle Georgia Raceway in 1969

Race details
- Race 53 of 54 in the 1969 NASCAR Grand National Series season
- Date: November 9, 1969; 57 years ago
- Official name: Georgia 500
- Location: Middle Georgia Raceway, Byron, Georgia
- Course: Permanent racing facility
- Course length: 0.548 miles (0.882 km)
- Distance: 500 laps, 227 mi (441 km)
- Weather: Temperatures of 73 °F (23 °C); wind speeds of 6 miles per hour (9.7 km/h)
- Average speed: 81.079 miles per hour (130.484 km/h)
- Attendance: 10,000

Pole position
Driver	Bobby Isaac	K&K Insurance Racing

Most laps led
Driver	David Pearson	Holman Moody
- Laps: 218

Winner
No. 22	Bobby Allison	Mario Rossi

Television in the United States
- Network: untelevised
- Announcers: none

The 1969 Georgia 500 was a NASCAR Grand National Series event that was held on November 9, 1969, at Middle Georgia Raceway in Byron, Georgia.

The transition to purpose-built racecars began in the early 1960s and occurred gradually over that decade. Changes made to the sport by the late 1960s brought an end to the "strictly stock" vehicles of the 1950s.

== Race report ==
It took two hours and thirty-seven minutes to thoroughly complete 500 laps worth of racing.

LeeRoy Yarbrough quit for reasons unknown after just 64 laps; causing him to become the last-place finisher. Don Tarr's vehicle would develop problems with its water pump; relegating it to the garage on lap 126. Larry Baumel became the lowest-finishing driver who did not quit the race.

James Cox also quit the race, but only after competing in 131 laps. Don Biederman's vehicle developed issues with its clutch on lap 130 while the rear end of Dick Brooks' vehicle forced him to retire from the race on lap 210. A problematic axle would end Roy Mayne's day on the track on lap 221. Engine problems would claim Friday Hassler's vehicle on lap 236 and Johnny Halford's vehicle on lap 256.

A problematic clutch would take Elmo Langley out of the metaphorical equation on lap 288 while engine issues forced Ed Negre to retire on lap 291. E.J. Trivette would notice the rear end of his vehicle missing on lap 314 while Pete Hazelwood was black-flagged out the race on lap 366. Neil Castles would be forced to depart from the race due to engine troubles on lap 381.

Richard Petty had an engine problem and secure himself a sixth-place finish while Earl Brooks ended up more than 100 laps behind the lead lap drivers.

A NASCAR-following audience of ten thousand strong supporters ended up seeing Bobby Allison besting David Pearson by a distance of five stock car lengths. While David Pearson, Bobby Isaac and Richard Petty dominated the first 100 laps, the final 100 laps were monopolized by David Pearson and Bobby Allison. Six notable crew chiefs were recorded as participating in the event; including Dick Hutcherson, Dale Inman and Harry Hyde.

Don Biederman was the only Canadian in a field of 29 mostly American-born drivers. Bobby Isaac's pole position speed of 94.148 miles per hour (151.517 km/h) exceeded the average race speed of 81.079 miles per hour (130.484 km/h) by an incredible amount of time. Individual post-race earnings for each driver ranged from the winner's share of $3,050 ($26,777 when considering inflation) to the last-place finisher's share of $350 ($3,073 when considering inflation). The total prize purse that was offered by the organizers was $19,075 ($167,469 when considering inflation).

=== Qualifying ===
Grid	No.	Driver	Manufacturer	Owner
1	71	Bobby Isaac	'69 Dodge	Nord Krauskopf
2	98	LeeRoy Yarbrough	'69 Ford	Junior Johnson
3	17	David Pearson	'69 Ford	Holman-Moody
4	43	Richard Petty	'69 Ford	Petty Enterprises
5	22	Bobby Allison	'69 Dodge	Mario Rossi
6	48	James Hylton	'69 Dodge	James Hylton
7	39	Friday Hassler	'67 Chevrolet	Friday Hassler
8	32	Dick Brooks	'69 Plymouth	Dick Brooks
9	06	Neil Castles	'67 Plymouth	Neil Castles
10	4	John Sears	'67 Ford	L.G. DeWitt

== Finishing order ==
Section reference:

1. Bobby Allison (No. 22)
2. David Pearson† (No. 17)
3. Bobby Isaac† (No. 71)
4. John Sears† (No. 4)
5. Bill Champion† (No. 10)
6. Richard Petty* (No. 43)
7. Cecil Gordon† (No. 47)
8. Ben Arnold (No. 76)
9. Henley Gray (No. 19)
10. James Hylton (No. 48)
11. Bill Seifert (No. 45)
12. Don Patton (No. 89)
13. Jabe Thomas (No. 25)
14. Wendell Scott† (No. 34)
15. Earl Brooks† (No. 26)
16. Neil Castles* (No. 06)
17. Pete Hazelwood* (No. 12)
18. E.J. Trivette* (No. 08)
19. Ed Negre* (No. 8)
20. Elmo Langley*† (No. 64)
21. Johnny Halford* (No. 57)
22. Friday Hassler*† (No. 39)
23. Roy Mayne*† (No. 82)
24. Dick Brooks*† (No. 32)
25. Don Biederman*† (No. 70)
26. James Cox* (No. 23)
27. Don Tarr* (No. 0)
28. Larry Baumel* (No. 68)
29. LeeRoy Yarbrough*† (No. 98)

† signifies that the driver is known to be deceased
* Driver failed to finish race

Preceded by 1969 Jeffco 200	NASCAR Grand National Series Season; 1969	Succeeded by 1969 Texas 500

Preceded by November 1968	Georgia 500 races 1969	Succeeded by 1970
