= Alfred Amadu Conteh =

American painter

- Born: 1975 (age 50–51); Fort Valley, Georgia
- Education: Hampton University; Georgia Southern University

Alfred Amadu Conteh (born 1975) is an American sculptor, painter and mixed-media artist.

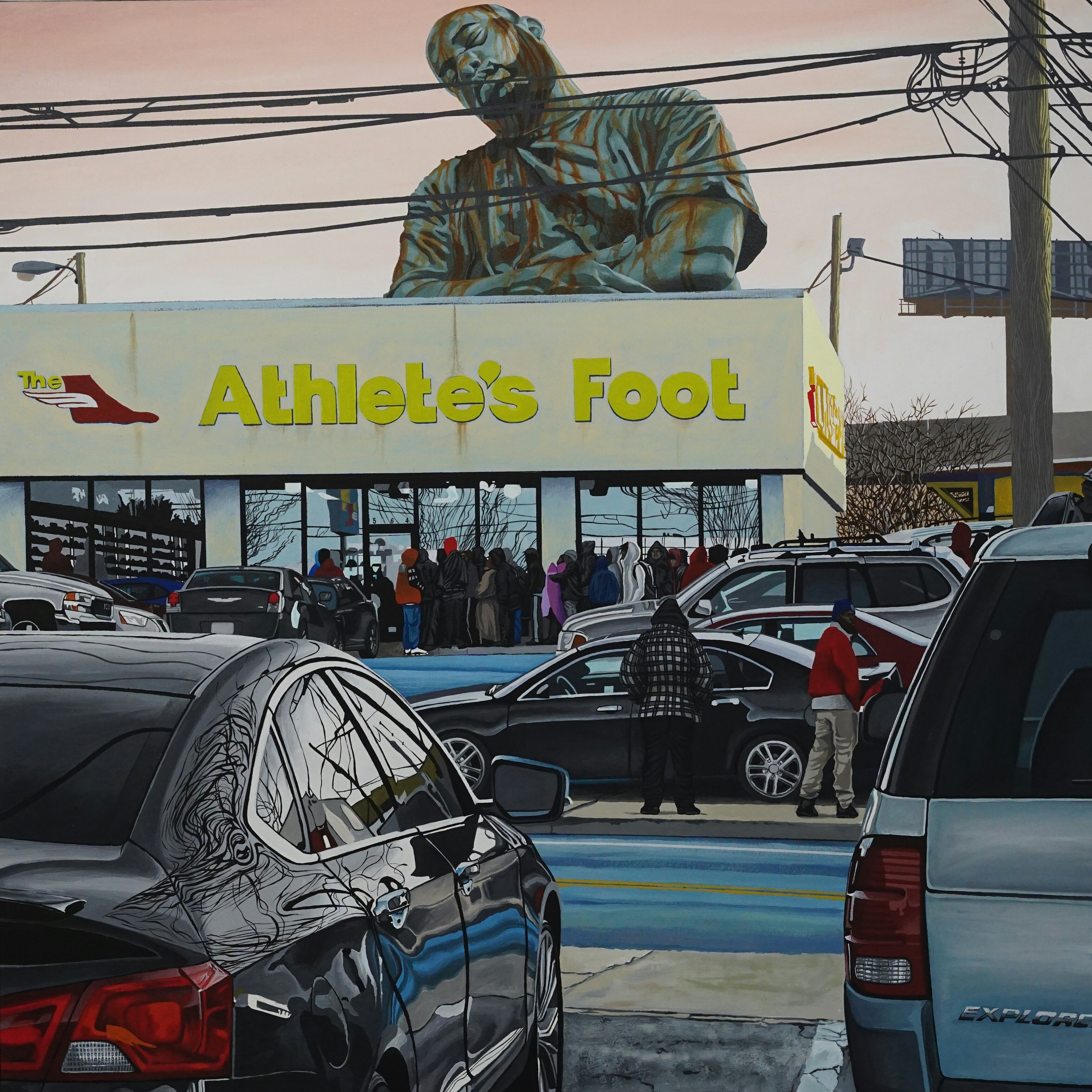
7 a.m. by Alfred Amadu Conteh

== Biography ==
Alfred Amadu Conteh was born in 1975 in Fort Valley, Georgia. He attended Hampton University in Hampton, Virginia, where he received a BFA. He received his MFA from Georgia Southern University in Statesboro, Georgia. His mother is African American and his father is from Sierra Leone, West Africa. Many of his works examine his personal identity through his parents' experiences and cultural differences. Along with paintings, Conteh creates organic contemporary sculpture that uses symbology to express his narratives of the African American southern experience." Conteh uses a variety of media as a vehicle to provoke thought that will result in change."

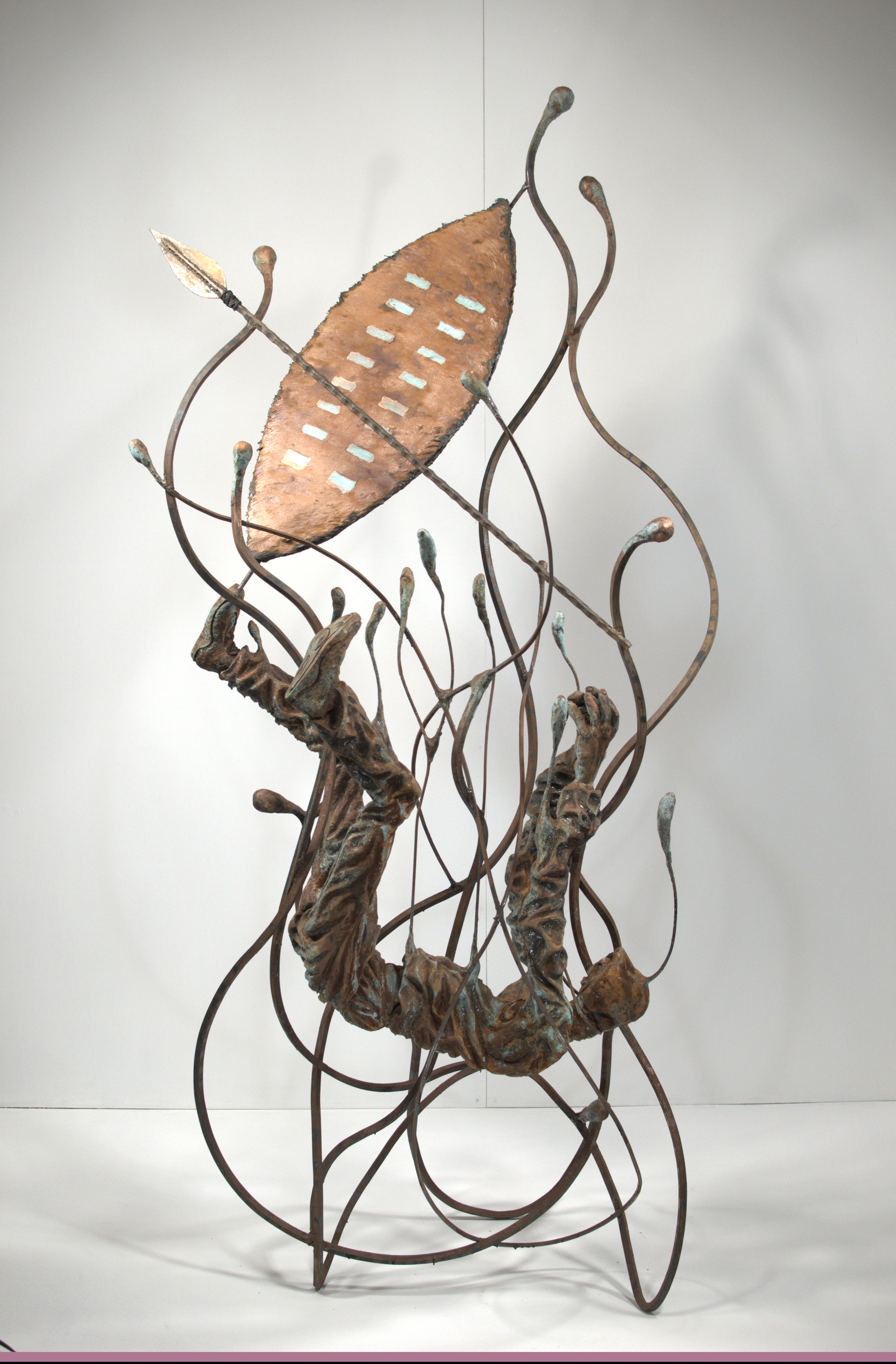
Sink by Alfred Amadu Conteh

== Career ==
Alfred Amadu Conteh began exhibiting in 2003 and since then he has participated in over 12 solo exhibitions and many group exhibitions. Conteh's work has caused controversial responses in some instances. His exhibition at Tubman Museum in 2015 in Macon, Georgia, caused a stir amongst religious leaders who found his piece "Preacher Pimp" offensive. "Conteh's "pimp" series features a variety of people and their wrongdoings to others. Among those included are the "Athlete Pimp," “Property-Owning Pimp" and "Mother Pimp." The series highlights the dark side of how we interact with others and treat them, Conteh said. "Preacher Pimp" reflects the religious leaders whose actions are unethical but isn't representative of all of church leaders, Conteh said."

Alfred Conteh's recent series, "Two Fronts", is a visual exploration of how people of the African Diaspora in the South are facing economic, educational, and psychological wars. His recent exhibition at September Gray Gallery in Atlanta, Georgia, garnered critical review from the Atlanta Journal-Constitution. "Conteh’s treatment of his subjects affirms the centrality of these people as representatives of the human condition: the mothers and workers and children and hustlers as worthy of their own commemoration."

Alfred Amadu Conteh has gained a national following. He has exhibited at several museums and galleries including, Tubman Museum in Macon, Georgia, Museum of Arts an Sciences, Hudgens Center for the Arts, and Art Basel Miami. His work has been collected and exhibited widely throughout the South."
