= Peach County, Georgia =

County in Georgia, United States

- County
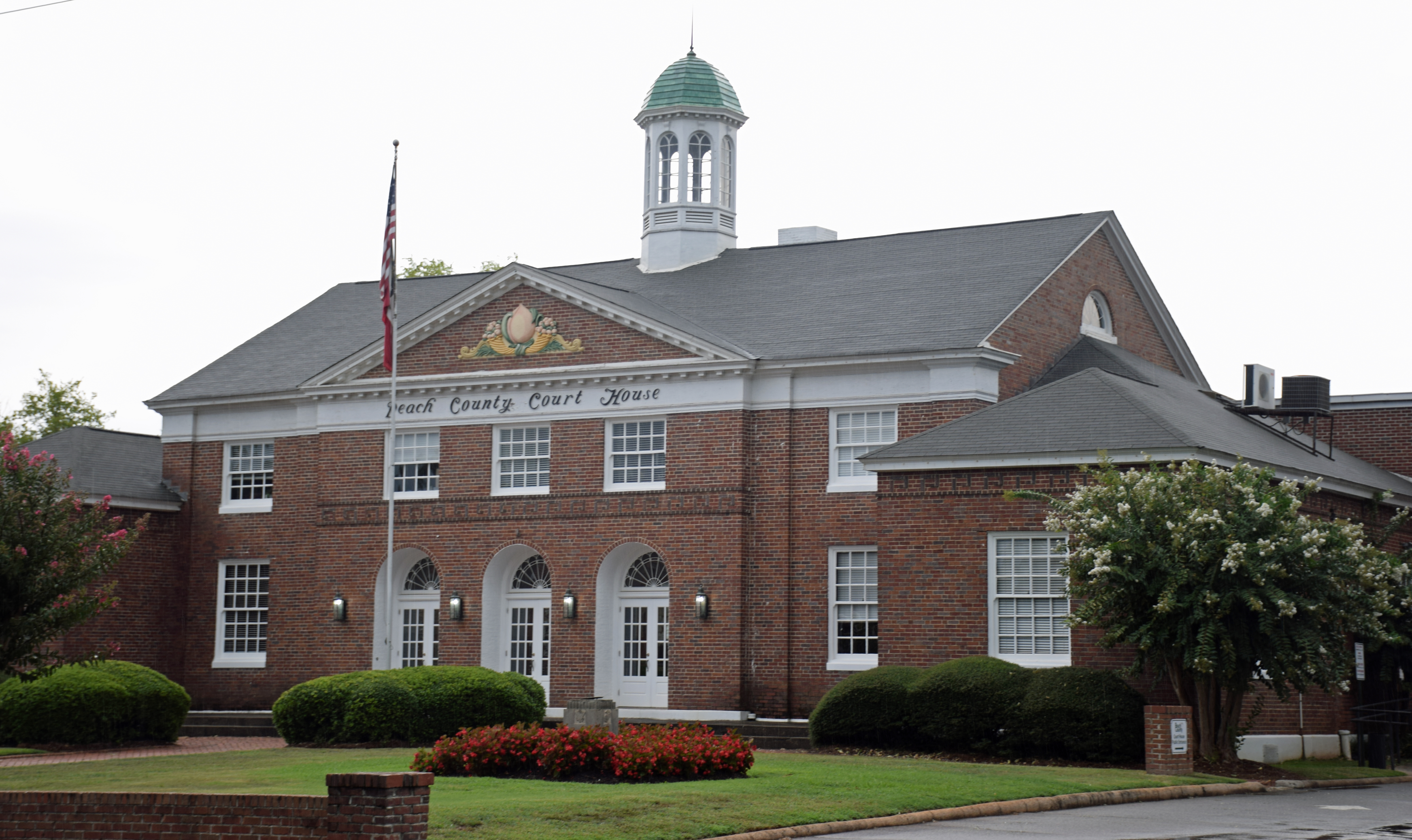
- Peach County Courthouse in Fort Valley

- Logo

- Location within the U.S. state of Georgia
- Coordinates: 32°34′N 83°50′W
- Country: United States
- State: Georgia
- Founded: July 18, 1924; 102 years ago
- Named for: Peach fruit
- Seat: Fort Valley
- Largest city: Fort Valley

Area
  - Total: 151 sq mi (390 km^{2})
  - Land: 150 sq mi (390 km^{2})
  - Water: 1.0 sq mi (2.6 km^{2}) 0.7%

Population (2020)
  - Total: 27,981
  - Estimate (2025): 29,877 ▲
  - Density: 187/sq mi (72/km^{2})
- Time zone: UTC−5 (Eastern)
  - Summer (DST): UTC−4 (EDT)
- Congressional district: 2nd
- Website: www.peachcounty.net

Peach County is a county located in the central portion of the U.S. state of Georgia. As of the 2020 census, the population was 27,981. Its county seat is Fort Valley. Founded in 1924, it is the state's newest county, taken from Houston and Macon counties on July 18 of that year. Its namesake is the peach on account of it being located in a peach-growing district.

Peach County is included in the Warner Robins, GA metropolitan statistical area, which is included in the Macon-Warner Robins, GA combined statistical area.

== Geography ==
According to the U.S. Census Bureau, the county has a total area of 151 square miles (390 km^{2}), of which 150 square miles (390 km^{2}) is land and 1.0 square mile (2.6 km^{2}) (0.7%) is water. It is the fifth-smallest county in Georgia by area.

The majority of Peach County is located in the Lower Ocmulgee River sub-basin of the Altamaha River basin. A small portion of the northern edge of the county, north of Byron, is located in the Upper Ocmulgee River sub-basin of the Altamaha River basin. The very western tip of Peach County is located in the Upper Flint River sub-basin of the ACF River Basin (Apalachicola-Chattahoochee-Flint River Basin).

=== Major highways ===
- Interstate 75 / State Route 401 (unsigned)
- U.S. Route 41 / State Route 11
- U.S. Route 341 / State Route 7
  - State Route 7 Connector
- Georgia State Route 42
- Georgia State Route 49
  - State Route 49 Connector
- Georgia State Route 96
- State Route 127
- State Route 247 Connector
- State Route 540 (Fall Line Freeway)

=== Adjacent counties ===
- Bibb County - north
- Houston County - east
- Crawford County - northwest
- Taylor County - west
- Macon County - southwest

== Communities ==
=== Cities ===
- Byron (mostly)
- Fort Valley (county seat)
- Warner Robins (partly)
- Perry (partly)

== Demographics ==
Historical population
Census	Pop.	Note	%±
1930	10,268		—
1940	10,378		1.1%
1950	11,705		12.8%
1960	13,846		18.3%
1970	15,990		15.5%
1980	19,151		19.8%
1990	21,189		10.6%
2000	23,668		11.7%
2010	27,695		17.0%
2020	27,981		1.0%
2025 (est.)	29,877	▲	6.8%
U.S. Decennial Census; 1790-1880 1890-1910; 1920-1930 1930-1940; 1940-1950 1960-1980; 1980-2000 2010 2020

=== Racial and ethnic composition ===
Peach County, Georgia – Racial and ethnic composition Note: the US Census treats Hispanic/Latino as an ethnic category. This table excludes Latinos from the racial categories and assigns them to a separate category. Hispanics/Latinos may be of any race.
Race / Ethnicity (NH = Non-Hispanic)	Pop 1980	Pop 1990	Pop 2000	Pop 2010	Pop 2020	% 1980	% 1990	% 2000	% 2010	% 2020
White alone (NH)	9,350	10,642	11,654	12,499	12,119	48.82%	50.22%	49.24%	45.13%	43.31%
Black or African American alone (NH)	9,588	10,017	10,682	12,647	12,139	50.07%	47.27%	45.13%	45.67%	43.38%
Native American or Alaska Native alone (NH)	23	72	66	59	63	0.12%	0.34%	0.28%	0.21%	0.23%
Asian alone (NH)	32	72	77	222	194	0.17%	0.34%	0.33%	0.80%	0.69%
Native Hawaiian or Pacific Islander alone (NH)	x	x	8	8	6	x	x	0.03%	0.03%	0.02%
Other race alone (NH)	14	8	21	26	98	0.07%	0.04%	0.09%	0.09%	0.35%
Mixed race or Multiracial (NH)	x	x	162	344	815	x	x	0.68%	1.24%	2.91%
Hispanic or Latino (any race)	144	378	998	1,890	2,547	0.75%	1.78%	4.22%	6.82%	9.10%
Total	19,151	21,189	23,668	27,695	27,981	100.00%	100.00%	100.00%	100.00%	100.00%

=== 2020 census ===
As of the 2020 census, the county had a population of 27,981, and 60.0% of residents lived in urban areas while 40.0% lived in rural areas. The median age was 39.1 years; 21.0% of residents were under the age of 18 and 17.2% were 65 years of age or older. For every 100 females there were 92.4 males, and for every 100 females age 18 and over there were 89.1 males age 18 and over.

The racial makeup of the county was 44.7% White, 43.7% Black or African American, 0.4% American Indian and Alaska Native, 0.7% Asian, 0.0% Native Hawaiian and Pacific Islander, 5.3% from some other race, and 5.2% from two or more races. Hispanic or Latino residents of any race comprised 9.1% of the population.

There were 10,693 households, including 6,596 families; 29.6% had children under the age of 18 living with them and 33.6% had a female householder with no spouse or partner present. About 28.2% of households were made up of individuals and 11.4% had someone living alone who was 65 years of age or older.

There were 11,991 housing units, of which 10.8% were vacant. Among occupied housing units, 64.9% were owner-occupied and 35.1% were renter-occupied, and the homeowner vacancy rate was 1.7% while the rental vacancy rate was 8.5%.

== Education ==
It is in the Peach County School District. Peach County High School is the comprehensive high school.

== Politics ==
As of the 2020s, Peach County is a swing county, voting 52.8% for Donald Trump in 2024. Since the 1990s, Peach County has been a bellwether, usually voting for the winning candidate in United States presidential elections. It has voted for the national winner in six of the past eight elections, only picking the national loser in 2000 and 2020. Before this, Peach County voted for the Democratic candidate in most elections during the 20th century, often by large margins.

For elections to the United States House of Representatives, Peach County is part of Georgia's 2nd congressional district, currently represented by Sanford Bishop. For elections to the Georgia State Senate, Peach County is part of District 18. For elections to the Georgia House of Representatives, Peach County is part of districts 134, 147 and 150.

United States presidential election results for Peach County, Georgia
Year	Republican		Democratic		Third party(ies)	
Year	No.	%	No.	%	No.	%
1928	208	26.67%	572	73.33%	0	0.00%
1932	56	8.54%	595	90.70%	5	0.76%
1936	49	5.91%	767	92.52%	13	1.57%
1940	155	17.24%	738	82.09%	6	0.67%
1944	236	20.43%	919	79.57%	0	0.00%
1948	166	13.91%	642	53.81%	385	32.27%
1952	374	19.70%	1,523	80.24%	1	0.05%
1956	461	23.03%	1,541	76.97%	0	0.00%
1960	628	30.47%	1,433	69.53%	0	0.00%
1964	1,970	55.40%	1,585	44.57%	1	0.03%
1968	904	23.16%	1,362	34.89%	1,638	41.96%
1972	3,747	60.83%	2,413	39.17%	0	0.00%
1976	1,163	22.57%	3,989	77.43%	0	0.00%
1980	1,642	31.76%	3,415	66.05%	113	2.19%
1984	2,652	44.05%	3,369	55.95%	0	0.00%
1988	2,782	48.00%	2,972	51.28%	42	0.72%
1992	2,327	33.37%	3,677	52.73%	969	13.90%
1996	2,676	39.63%	3,582	53.05%	494	7.32%
2000	3,525	49.39%	3,540	49.60%	72	1.01%
2004	4,554	53.24%	3,961	46.31%	39	0.46%
2008	5,173	46.20%	5,927	52.94%	96	0.86%
2012	5,287	45.83%	6,148	53.29%	102	0.88%
2016	5,413	50.08%	5,100	47.18%	296	2.74%
2020	6,506	51.82%	5,922	47.17%	126	1.00%
2024	7,104	52.80%	6,293	46.77%	57	0.42%

United States Senate election results for Peach County, Georgia2
Year	Republican		Democratic		Third party(ies)	
Year	No.	%	No.	%	No.	%
2020	6,483	52.15%	5,702	45.87%	247	1.99%
2020	5,717	51.73%	5,335	48.27%	0	0.00%

United States Senate election results for Peach County, Georgia3
Year	Republican		Democratic		Third party(ies)	
Year	No.	%	No.	%	No.	%
2020	3,358	27.19%	4,032	32.64%	4,962	40.17%
2020	5,701	51.59%	5,350	48.41%	0	0.00%
2022	5,156	51.56%	4,701	47.01%	143	1.43%
2022	4,751	51.73%	4,433	48.27%	0	0.00%

Georgia Gubernatorial election results for Peach County
Year	Republican		Democratic		Third party(ies)	
Year	No.	%	No.	%	No.	%
1966	1,651	49.46%	1,428	42.78%	259	7.76%
1970	1,266	31.86%	2,704	68.04%	4	0.10%
1974	1,180	30.09%	2,740	69.86%	2	0.05%
1978	257	9.73%	2,384	90.27%	0	0.00%
1982	1,124	24.80%	3,409	75.20%	0	0.00%
1986	646	17.62%	3,021	82.38%	0	0.00%
1990	1,753	36.90%	2,901	61.06%	97	2.04%
1994	2,142	43.21%	2,815	56.79%	0	0.00%
1998	1,927	35.38%	3,396	62.36%	123	2.26%
2002	3,027	53.78%	2,525	44.86%	77	1.37%
2006	3,323	55.25%	2,471	41.09%	220	3.66%
2010	3,570	47.93%	3,678	49.38%	201	2.70%
2014	3,614	49.94%	3,514	48.56%	109	1.51%
2018	5,432	52.01%	4,966	47.54%	47	0.45%
2022	5,542	55.20%	4,431	44.14%	66	0.66%
2026	5,069	47.57%	5,586	52.43%	0	0.00%

== See also ==
- National Register of Historic Places listings in Peach County, Georgia
- List of counties in Georgia
