= Danny Lockett =

American football player (born 1964)

No. 50, 94, 90
- Position: Linebacker

Personal information
- Born: July 11, 1964 (age 62); Fort Valley, Georgia, U.S.
- Listed height: 6 ft 2 in (1.88 m)
- Listed weight: 239 lb (108 kg)

Career information
- High school: Peach County (Fort Valley)
- College: Sequoias JC (1983); Arizona (1984–1986)
- NFL draft: 1987: 6th round, 148th overall pick

Career history
- Detroit Lions (1987–1988); San Francisco 49ers (1990)*; London Monarchs (1991); New York Jets (1991)*; London Monarchs (1992); Detroit Drive/Massachusetts Marauders (1993–1994); Orlando Predators (1995); Texas Terror (1996); Connecticut Coyotes (1996); Milwaukee Mustangs (1997)
- * Offseason or practice squad member only

Awards and highlights
- World Bowl champion (1991); WLAF Co-Defensive MVP (1991); 2× First-team All-WLAF (1991–1992); 2× First-team All-Arena (1993–1994); Second-team All-Pac-10 (1986)

Career NFL statistics
- Sacks: 2
- Fumble recoveries: 2
- Stats at Pro Football Reference
- Stats at ArenaFan.com

Dannie Key "Danny" Lockett (born July 11, 1964) is an American former professional football player who was a linebacker for two seasons with the Detroit Lions of the National Football League (NFL). He was selected by the Lions in the sixth round of the 1987 NFL draft. He played college football for the Arizona Wildcats. He was also a member of the San Francisco 49ers and New York Jets of the NFL, the London Monarchs of the World League of American Football (WLAF), and the Detroit Drive/Massachusetts Marauders, Orlando Predators, Texas Terror, Connecticut Coyotes and Milwaukee Mustangs of the Arena Football League (AFL).

== Early life and college ==
Dannie Key Lockett was born on July 11, 1964, in Fort Valley, Georgia. He attended Peach County High School in Fort Valley.

Lockett played college football at the College of the Sequoias in 1983. He was then a member of the Arizona Wildcats of the University of Arizona from 1984 to 1986. He was a two-year letterman in 1985 and 1986. Lockett was named second-team All-Pac-10 by the Coaches as a senior in 1986.

== Professional career ==
Lockett was selected by the Detroit Lions in the sixth round, with the 148th overall pick, of the 1987 NFL draft. He officially signed with the team on July 25. He played in 13 games, starting one, for the Lions during the 1987 season, recording one sack and one fumble recovery. He missed three games that year due to the 1987 NFL players strike. Lockett appeared in all 16 games in 1988, totaling one sack and one fumble recovery. He was released by the Lions on September 1, 1989.

Lockett signed with the San Francisco 49ers on March 20, 1990. He was released on June 20, 1990.

Lockett started all ten games for the London Monarchs of the World League of American Football (WLAF) during the 1991 WLAF season, totaling 65 tackles, 14 sacks, three forced fumbles, and three fumble recoveries. The Monarchs finished the season with a 9–1 record and won the first-ever World Bowl (World Bowl '91) against the Barcelona Dragons by a score of 21–0. Lockett earned first-team All-WLAF and WLAF co-defensive MVP honors for the 1991 season.

Lockett was signed by the New York Jets on June 18, 1991. On June 29, while not wearing a seatbelt, he lost control of his car and was thrown out of the vehicle's open roof, causing him to land in a ditch. He did not suffer any broken bones as a result of the accident. He was later released by the Jets on August 6, 1991.

Lockett returned to the Monarchs in 1992, recording 14 sacks and one interception. He was named first-team All-WLAF for the second consecutive season. The Monarchs finished the year with a 2–7–1 record.

Lockett played in 11 games for the Detroit Drive of the Arena Football League (AFL) in 1993, accumulating 39 solo tackles, 11 assisted tackles, eight sacks, two fumble recoveries, nine pass breakups, and one interception that he returned for a touchdown. He was an offensive lineman/defensive lineman during his time in the AFL as the league played under ironman rules. He garnered first-team All-Arena recognition for the 1993 season. The Drive finished the year with an 11–1 record and eventually advanced to ArenaBowl VII, where they lost to the Tampa Bay Storm by a score of 51–31. The Drive became the Massachusetts Marauders in 1994. Lockett appeared in nine games during the 1994 season, totaling 17 solo tackles, 5 assisted tackles, four sacks, and two pass breakups. He earned first-team All-Arena honors for the second consecutive season.

Lockett played in seven games for the AFL's Orlando Predators in 1995, recording ten solo tackles, three assisted tackles, one sack, two forced fumbles, one fumble recovery, two pass breakups, and two blocked kicks.

Lockett began the 1996 AFL season by playing in five games for the Connecticut Coyotes, accumulating four solo tackles, three assisted tackles, and 0.5 sacks while also catching two passes for 23 yards and two touchdowns.

He then appeared in nine games for the Texas Terror of the AFL in 1996, posting 12 solo tackles, three sacks, and one interception while catching four passes for 45 yards.

Lockett played in six games for the Milwaukee Mustangs of the AFL in 1997, totaling five solo tackles, three assisted tackles, one sack, and two pass breakups.
