= Randy McMichael =

American football player (born 1979)

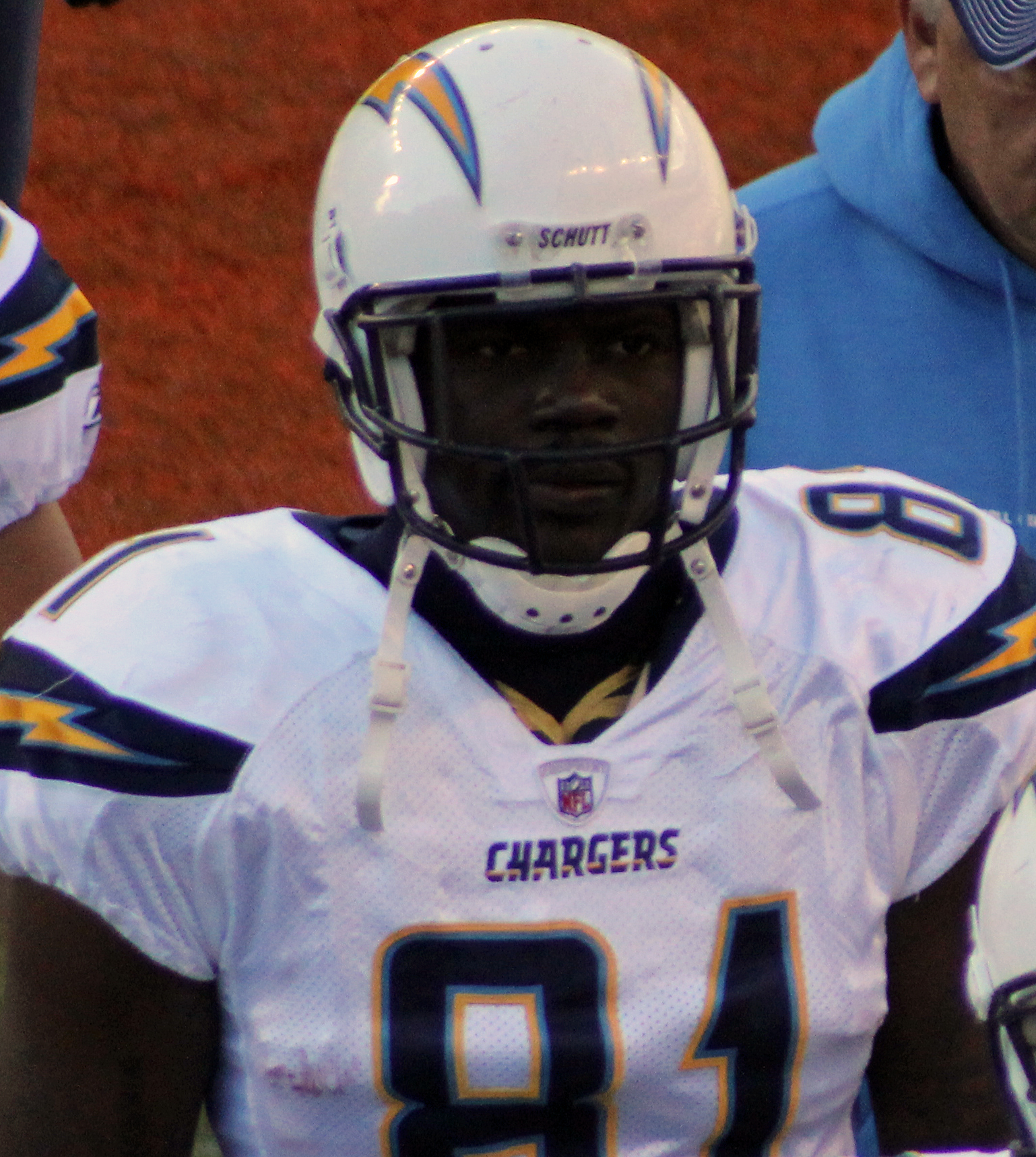
- McMichael with the San Diego Chargers in 2011

No. 81, 84
- Position: Tight end

Personal information
- Born: June 28, 1979 (age 47); Griffin, Georgia, U.S.
- Listed height: 6 ft 3 in (1.91 m)
- Listed weight: 248 lb (112 kg)

Career information
- High school: Peach County (Fort Valley, Georgia)
- College: Georgia (1997–2001)
- NFL draft: 2002: 4th round, 114th overall pick

Career history
- Miami Dolphins (2002–2006); St. Louis Rams (2007–2009); San Diego Chargers (2010–2012)

Awards and highlights
- First-team All-SEC (2001); First-team Freshman All-American (1999)

Career NFL statistics
- Receptions: 426
- Receiving yards: 4,539
- Receiving touchdowns: 24
- Stats at Pro Football Reference

Randy Montez McMichael (born June 28, 1979) is an American former professional football player who was a tight end in the National Football League (NFL). He was selected by the Miami Dolphins in the fourth round of the 2002 NFL draft. He played college football for the Georgia Bulldogs.

== Early life ==
McMichael was named to the Atlanta Journal-Constitution's Top 50 in the state of Georgia at Peach County High School in Fort Valley, Georgia. He was voted the team's best offensive lineman as a senior, and also lettered in basketball and track during his prep career.

== College career ==
McMichael was a three-year letterman at Georgia from 1999 to 2001. He missed all but one game in 1997 with a thumb injury, and missed all of 1998 with a knee injury.

In 1999, he caught 34 passes for 357 yards and three touchdowns, earning First-team Freshman All-American honors from The Sporting News and SEC coaches. As a sophomore in 2000, McMichael hauled in 32 passes for 475 yards and a score, earning an honorable mention All-conference selection. He was a First-team All-SEC selection by the Associated Press and SEC coaches in his final year of 2001 when he started nine of the ten games in which he appeared and had 24 receptions for 281 yards and a touchdown.

McMichael started 21 of the 33 games in which he played during his career and caught 90 passes for 1,213 yards and five touchdowns. He finished ranked ninth in school history for career receiving yards.

== Professional career ==
=== Pre-draft figures ===
Pre-draft measurables
Height	Weight	40-yard dash	10-yard split	20-yard split	20-yard shuttle	Three-cone drill	Vertical jump	Broad jump	Bench press	Wonderlic
6 ft 3 in (1.91 m)	247 lb (112 kg)	4.64 s	1.82 s	2.83 s	4.24 s	7.51 s	36 in (0.91 m)	9 ft 4 in (2.84 m)	24 reps	26
All values from NFL Combine.

=== Miami Dolphins ===
McMichael was selected in the fourth round (114th overall) in the 2002 NFL draft by the Miami Dolphins. The pick used by Dolphins to select him was originally acquired from the New Orleans Saints in the deal that sent running back Ricky Williams to the Miami Dolphins.

McMichael made his NFL debut in a starting role against the Detroit Lions on September 8, when he tied for team-lead with four receptions and led the team with 73 yards. He also scored his first NFL touchdown in the game, hauling in a Jay Fiedler pass from 16 yards out in the second quarter.

He started all 16 games in his rookie season, catching 39 passes for 485 yards and four touchdowns. His four receiving scores led the team, while his reception and yardage figures both were third. He became the first Dolphins rookie tight end ever to start every regular season contest. No Dolphins tight end had produced as many stats as McMichael had since Troy Drayton in 1997 (39 receptions, 558 yards, 4 touchdowns). McMichael's four touchdown catches were the third-highest figure by a Dolphins rookie at any position, and the most by a tight end, surpassing Ferrell Edmunds, who had three in 1988. McMichael had a reception in 15 of 16 games. Of his 39 catches, five went for 25 yards or longer – third-most on the team, trailing only James McKnight (9) and Chris Chambers (7).

Although he was the eighth tight end taken in the 2002 NFL Draft, McMichael's receiving totals ranked second among all NFL rookie tight ends in 2002, trailing only the New York Giants’ Jeremy Shockey – the 14th overall pick in the draft. McMichael's touchdown total was also the most of any rookie tight end in the league in 2002.

McMichael emerged as one of the top receiving tight ends in the league in his second NFL season, starting all 16 games and finishing with 49 receptions for 598 yards and two touchdowns. He added another touchdown on a fumble recovery. McMichael ranked third on the team in receptions and second in receiving yards. He led or shared the team-lead in receiving four times during the course of the season, while topping the team in receiving yards on five occasions. Of his 49 receptions, five went for 25 yards or longer (second-most on the team) trailing only Chris Chambers (8). He had a reception in all but one game. He ranked fourth among AFC tight ends in both receptions and receiving yards.

McMichael had his most productive game of the season and one of the top receiving days ever by a Dolphins tight end against the New England Patriots on October 19, when he caught eight passes for 102 yards. His eight receptions tied a team record for a tight end at the time, achieved three times previously, most recently by Keith Jackson who did it in a Divisional Playoff game on January 8, 1995, at the San Diego Chargers.

For the third straight year, McMichael started all 16 games. He was one of only two Dolphins offensive players to open every game in 2004, with offensive lineman Seth McKinney being the other. McMichael put together the most prolific receiving season of any tight end in Dolphins history, leading the team with 73 receptions while his 791 receiving yards ranked second, trailing only Chris Chambers, who registered 898 yards. He also scored four touchdowns on the season and had a two-point conversion to his credit. He had five receptions for 25 yards or longer on the season, tied with Marty Booker for second on the squad, trailing only Chambers, who had six. Overall, McMichael led the Dolphins in receptions eight times and in receiving yards on seven occasions over the course of the season. His reception total ranked 13th in the AFC. He tied for fourth in the AFC with 24 third-down receptions. His 73 receptions and 791 receiving yards both represent single-season standards for a Dolphins tight end, as he surpassed the previous marks set by Keith Jackson in 1994. For his performance during the season, McMichael was a first-alternate for the AFC Pro Bowl squad.

In 2005, McMichael started 16 games for the fourth straight year to open his career. He ended 2005 having opened 64 consecutive contests. On the year, he caught 60 passes for 582 yards and five touchdowns. His reception total and five receiving scores ranked second on the squad, while his yardage figure was third. All three figures placed him fourth among AFC tight ends. His reception figure was the second-highest single-season total by a Dolphins tight end, while his five receiving scores tied for fourth and marked a personal single-season best. McMichael led the team in receptions on six occasions and in receiving yardage once. He had a touchdown reception in each of the first four games of the season -the only player in the NFL to achieve this feat in 2005.

On October 7, 2005, McMichael signed a four-year contract extension with the Dolphins to keep him with the team through the 2009 season. The four-year extension was worth slightly more than $18 million in "new money" and includes $8.92 million in bonuses. On average, it ranked slightly behind the deal signed by fellow tight end Todd Heap of the Baltimore Ravens around the same time.

The Dolphins' offense struggled as a whole in 2006, and like Chris Chambers, McMichael was not consistently utilized by quarterback Joey Harrington. For the season, McMichael finished second on the team in receptions with 62 catches for 640 yards and three touchdowns. In a three-game span (from October 8 through October 22) he totaled 21 catches for 233 yards. He finished fifth among AFC tight ends in receptions and was sixth in receiving yards. He led the team in receptions five times and in reception yardage four times during the season.

For the fifth straight year, McMichael started all 16 games of the season. Through 2006, McMichael played 80 career games without ever missing a start. At season's end, McMichael was already the team's all-time leading tight end in receptions and receiving yards, and ranked third in touchdowns.

The Dolphins released McMichael on March 5, 2007, in lieu of paying him a $3 million bonus due the following week.

=== St. Louis Rams ===
On March 8, 2007, the St. Louis Rams signed McMichael to a three-year, $11 million deal that includes a $3 million signing bonus. The deal reunited McMichael with Scott Linehan, the Dolphins' 2005 offensive coordinator and then head coach of the Rams. McMichael suffered a season-ending right tibia injury against Buffalo on September 8, 2008, and missed the rest of the 2008 NFL season, after posting 11 catches for 139 yards. The 2009 NFL season he played all 16 games, finishing with 34 catches for 332 yards and 1 touchdown.

=== San Diego Chargers ===
After his signing with the team in 2009, McMichael was mostly known for his blocking ability. On November 7, 2010, McMichael got his first start in two years due to star tight end Antonio Gates being injured in a game against the Houston Texans he caught two catches that went for touchdowns, San Diego went on to win 29–23.

On March 12, 2013, McMichael was cut by the Chargers.

== NFL career statistics ==
Year	Team	Games		Receiving					
Year	Team	GP	GS	Tgt	Rec	Yds	Avg	Lng	TD
2002	MIA	16	16	68	39	485	12.4	45	4
2003	MIA	16	16	83	49	598	12.2	46	2
2004	MIA	16	16	118	73	791	10.8	42	4
2005	MIA	16	16	104	60	582	9.7	30	5
2006	MIA	16	16	96	62	640	10.3	24	3
2007	STL	16	15	67	39	429	11.0	29	3
2008	STL	4	4	21	11	139	12.6	31	0
2009	STL	16	16	62	34	332	9.8	35	1
2010	SD	16	11	27	20	221	11.1	28	2
2011	SD	16	14	44	30	271	9.0	30	0
2012	SD	16	10	13	9	51	5.7	13	0
Career		164	150	703	426	4,539	10.7	46	24

=== Dolphins franchise records ===
- Most career receiving yards by a tight end — 3,096
- Most career receptions by a tight end — 283

== Radio career ==
In May 2019, Randy McMichael began co-hosting a midday program with Andy Bunker on sports-talk "92-9 The Game" WZGC in Atlanta. He also hosts the station's Saturday morning College Game Time program.
