= Byron Historic District =

Historic district in Georgia, United States

- U.S. National Register of Historic Places
- Location within Georgia
- Location: Roughly, along the Central GA RR tracks from Jackson St. to Vinson St. including Boulevard, Main, Church and Academy Sts, Byron, Georgia
- Coordinates: 32°39′15″N 83°45′34″W
- Area: 67 acres (27 ha)
- Built: 1874
- Architect: M. M. Marshall
- Architectural style: Greek Revival, Late Victorian, Late 19th and 20th Century Revivals
- NRHP reference No.: 95000739
- Added to NRHP: June 20, 1995

The Byron Historic District, in Byron, Georgia, is a historic district which was listed on the National Register of Historic Places in 1995. The listing included 57 contributing buildings and a contributing structure on 67 acres (27 ha).

The district is 67 acres (27 ha) in size and runs roughly along the Central of Georgia Railroad tracks from Jackson St. to Vinson St., and includes parts of Boulevard, Main, Church and Academy Streets. It includes a commercial area and several residential areas.

The commercial area includes a rehabilitated depot and warehouses along the railroad, and a number of brick and cast-concrete commercial buildings. The latter are mainly simple with little or no decoration. The commercial area includes:

- Byron Depot (c.1870 or c.1900, wood frame railroad depot and caboose, restored in recent years. This now serves as a museum with Byron and railroad history as the Byron Historic Train Depot Museum
- Woodman of the World building (c.1920), originally holding Farmers Bank and the Woodman of the World chapter, later an office building and post office.
- The Drugstore Deli building (1915), originally Vinson's Drug Store, built of cast-concrete block, now a sandwich shop.

Community landmark buildings include:

- Old Methodist Church (c.1880), designed by architect M.M. Marshall, and, noncontributing: its education building (1922) whose remains are incorporated into the 1967 Methodist church.
- Jail, brick, one-story, which, as of 1995, the local historical society was planning to occupy for its headquarters. In 2019, the Byron Area Historical Society Headquarters is indeed located at 108 Jailhouse Alley.
- School from 1950s (non-contributing) on site of old Byron School. This is now torn down and replaced by city hall.

It also includes:

- Richardson-Collins House (1867), oldest house in district. Georgian cottage with Victorian decoration added later.
- Ebenezer Jackson House (c.1870), second oldest. Georgian cottage with Victorian decoration added later.

The Byron Visitors' Bureau also identifies the following selected buildings on their website.

- Walker/Chisolm House (c.1860), 200 Main Street - David Walker family residence originally, now a commercial property.
- Dr. Kay's Office, 103 East Heritage - Clinic from the 1930s, first of its kind in the area, where doctor and nurse team of Dr. and Mrs. J.B. Kay delivered more than 3,500 babies.
- Vinson/Peavy/Chidester House (1911), 200 East Heritage - Eastlake Victorian
- New South Cottage (1890), 202 East Heritage - served as parsonage of Methodist church until 1928.
