= Tim Watson (safety) =

American football player (born 1970)

Tim Watson (Tazim Wajid Wajed)
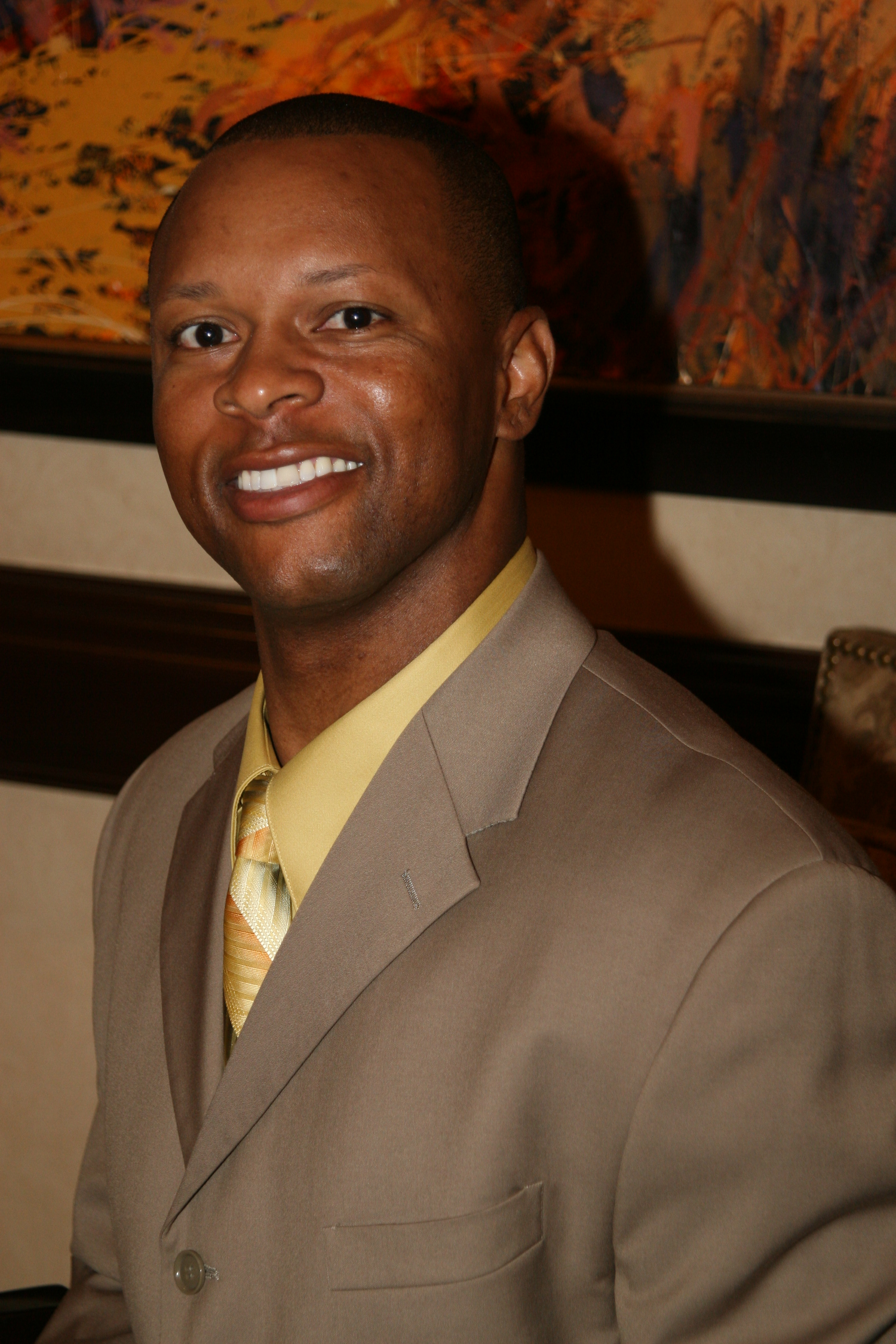
- Watson in 2008

No. 26, 33, 21
- Position: Safety

Personal information
- Born: August 13, 1970 (age 56); Fort Valley, Georgia, U.S.
- Listed height: 6 ft 2 in (1.88 m)
- Listed weight: 214 lb (97 kg)

Career information
- High school: Peach County (Fort Valley, Georgia)
- College: Howard
- NFL draft: 1993: 6th round, 156th overall pick

Career history
- Green Bay Packers (1993)*; Cleveland Browns (1993)*; Green Bay Packers (1993); Kansas City Chiefs (1993–1995); New York Giants (1995); Oakland Raiders (1996)*; Barcelona Dragons (1996); Philadelphia Eagles (1997); Arizona Rattlers (1998)
- * Offseason or practice squad member only
- Stats at Pro Football Reference

Tazim Wajid Wajed (born James Timothy Watson Jr.; August 13, 1970) is an American former professional football safety in the National Football League (NFL). He was selected by the Green Bay Packers in the sixth round of the 1993 NFL draft, and also played for the Kansas City Chiefs, New York Giants, and Philadelphia Eagles.

== Early life ==
Watson was born in Fort Valley, Georgia. He was a three-sport athlete in high school, lettering in football, basketball, and track. An All-Middle Georgia selection following his senior football season, Watson graduated with honors from Peach County High School.

== College career ==
Watson played college football at Howard University. He holds the record for blocked kicks at Howard, with seven. He has the distinction of being the first athlete in the history of the school to be named to the GTE Academic All-America Team (1992).

Watson earned a bachelor's degree cum laude in fashion merchandising and business marketing, then completed post-graduate studies in athletic administration. In 1992 he became a member of Omega Psi Phi fraternity. Most recently, Watson was inducted into the Howard University Athletic Hall of Fame, class of 2005.

== Professional career ==
Watson was selected by the Green Bay Packers in the sixth round (156th overall) of the 1993 NFL draft. He later played for the Kansas City Chiefs, New York Giants, and Philadelphia Eagles. He also played in the World League of American Football for the Barcelona Dragons and the Arena Football League for the Arizona Rattlers.

== Personal life ==
Wajed is married to wife Lisa, and is the father of five children: including Christian and Tré, who followed in their father's footsteps playing professional football. Tré signed as an UDFA with the Miami Dolphins in 2019, spent a season in the XFL with the Dallas Renegades, 2 in the CFL with the Montreal Alouettes and Edmonton Elks, and currently plays with the St. Louis Battlehawks of the XFL. Christian plays wide receiver, and was drafted by the Packers in the 2022 NFL draft.
