= Peach County School District =

School district in Georgia (U.S. state)

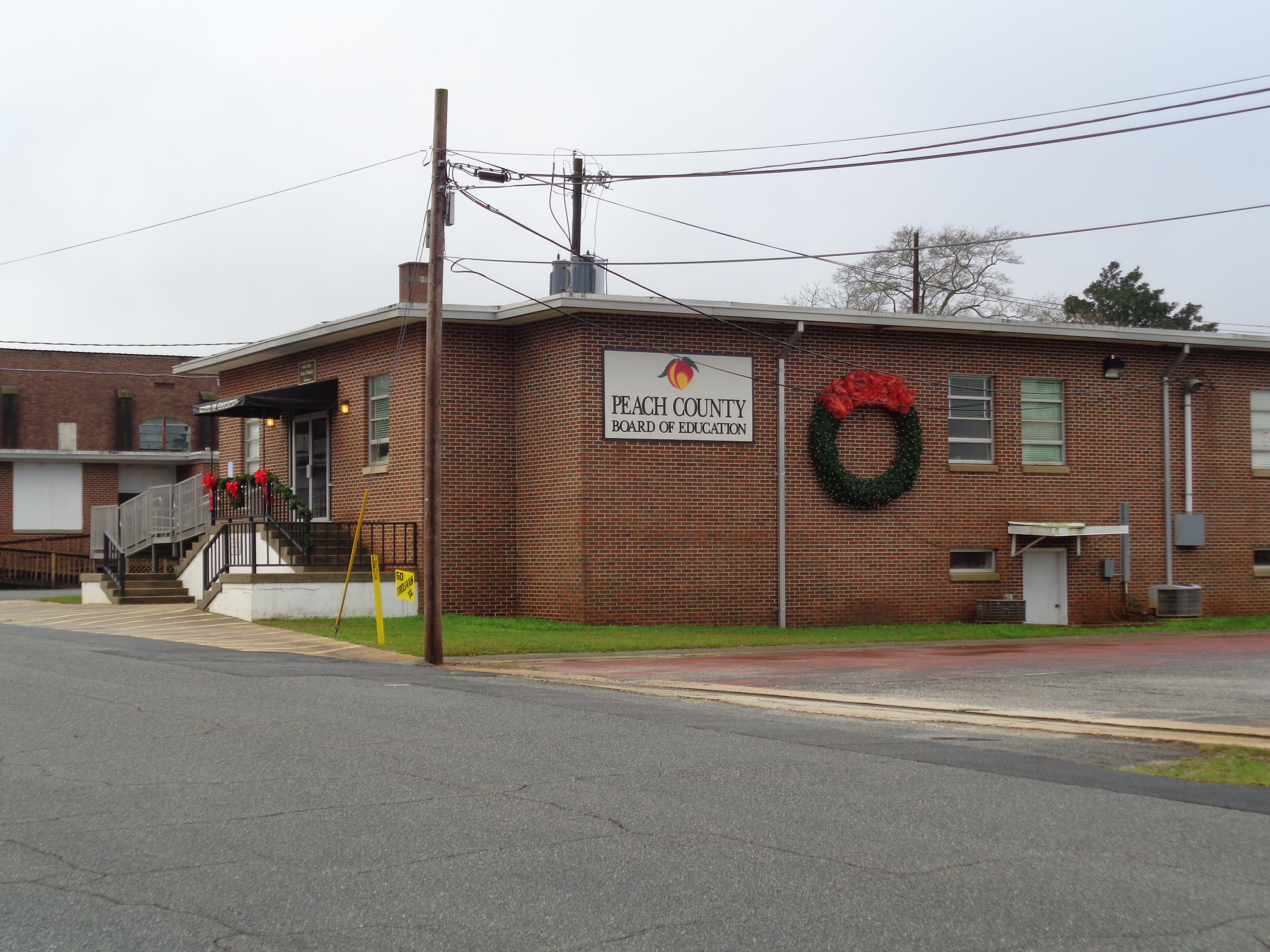

Address
- 900 Campus Drive Fort Valley, Georgia, 31030-4185; United States
- Coordinates: 32.191052°N 83.173971°W

District information
- Grades: Pre-school - 12
- Superintendent: Susan S. Clark
- Accreditations: Southern Association of Colleges and Schools; Georgia Accrediting Commission

Students and staff
- Enrollment: 3,927
- Faculty: 270

Other information
- Telephone: (478) 825-5933
- Fax: (478) 825-9970
- Website: www.peachschools.org

The Peach County School District is a public school district in Peach County, Georgia, United States, based in Fort Valley.

The only school district in the county, it serves the communities of Byron, Fort Valley, Perry, and Peach County sections of Warner Robins.

== Schools ==
The Peach County School District has three elementary schools, two middle schools, and one high school.

Elementary schools

- Byron Elementary School
- Hunt Elementary School
- Kay Road Elementary School
- Hunt Primary School - now closed

Middle schools

- Byron Middle School
- Fort Valley Middle School

High school

- Peach County High School
