= Louis Ivory =

American football player (born 1980)

No. 34
- Position: Running back

Personal information
- Born: February 6, 1980 (age 46); Fort Valley, Georgia, U.S.
- Listed height: 5 ft 9 in (1.75 m)
- Listed weight: 200 lb (91 kg)

Career information
- High school: Peach County (Fort Valley, GA)
- College: Furman (1998–2001)

Awards and highlights
- Walter Payton Award (2000)
- Stats at ESPN

Louis Ivory (born February 6, 1980) is a former American college football running back. He played for the Furman Paladins.

== Early life ==
Ivory was born in Fort Valley, Georgia, where he attended Peach County High School.

== College career ==
Ivory grew up 140 miles from Division I-AA (now known as Division I FCS) powerhouse Georgia Southern, which did not recruit him. He instead attended rival Furman University. In 2000, Ivory recorded 2,079 rushing yards and 16 touchdowns on 286 carries.

As a junior, he received the 2000 Walter Payton Award for the most outstanding player in Division I-AA. In his senior year, Ivory rushed for 1,719 yards and 19 touchdowns on 289 carries.
