= Tubman Museum =

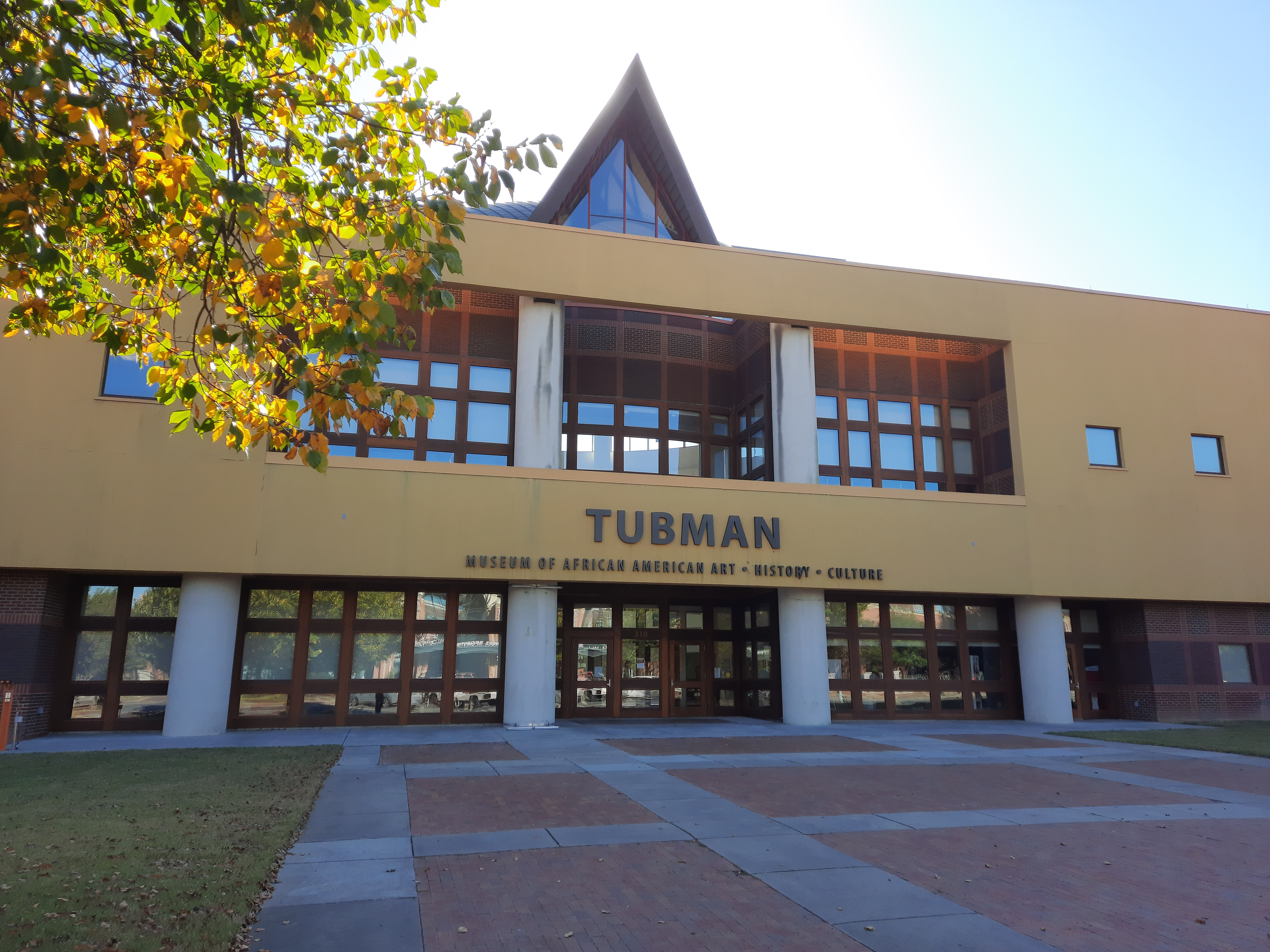
- Front entrance of the Tubman Museum
- Former name: Harriet Tubman Historical and Cultural Museum
- Established: 1981
- Location: Macon, Georgia
- Coordinates: 32.83367°N 83.62514°W
- Type: Art museum
- Founder: Richard Keil
- Executive director: Harold Young
- Chief Financial Officer: Barrie Miller-Howard
- Director: Jeff Bruce
- Chairperson: Billy Pitts
- Public transit access: Terminal Station
- Parking: on-street and back parking lot
- Website: tubmanmuseum.com

The Tubman Museum, formerly known as the "Tubman African American Museum", is located in Macon, Georgia, USA. It is located in the city's museum district near the Georgia Music Hall of Fame and Georgia Sports Hall of Fame.

== History ==
=== Location ===
Founded in 1981, this 8,500-square-foot (790 m^{2}) museum is dedicated to preserving and displaying African American art, history, and culture. The museum was located at the corner of Dr. Martin Luther King, Jr., Drive and Walnut Street from its founding until 2015. The 8,500 square foot building was replaced with a new 49,500 square foot building in front of Terminal Station and across the street from the Georgia Sports Hall of Fame. Plans for the new building began in 2001. The board of directors broke ground in 2001, but due to the economic downturn of 2007–2008, the building project was delayed. The old building closed on April 10, 2015, with the museum holding a farewell party on April 16. The new facility opened on May 16, 2015, during the Pan-African Festival in Downtown Macon. The ceremony included a march from the old Tubman Museum to the new building where the ribbon cutting took place.

== Mission ==
The museum's mission is to educate people about African American culture and history. The museum also offers an array of exhibitions, programs, and publications for the general public and student groups from kindergarten through college. There are classes offered in dancing, drama, drumming, photography, and visual art that are focused on African American culture.

=== Beginnings ===
The Tubman Museum had been a longtime dream of the Rev. Richard Keil, formed over more than two decades of working in predominantly black churches primarily in the South. When Keil, a Catholic priest, was assigned to St. Peter Claver Church in Macon, he thought the city would be the perfect place for the museum, given its central location and access to interstates. In 1981, after consulting with various African American community leaders, he found a building on Walnut Street, made the down payment and personally signed for a loan, confident that others would contribute. In his 2015 book, “Lessons along the Way,” Keil explained his motivation for starting the museum:

“It was 1981. In the quarter of a century I’d spent pastoring in black churches, I had seen the legacy of slavery and segregation. Too many African Americans were living in poverty in crime-ridden neighborhoods where drug use was rampant and the black pride of the 1960s and 1970s had fallen by the wayside. Starting a museum wasn’t just an act of love and appreciation. It was necessary. “Even though race relations had improved significantly over time, and black people were continually making strides in the economic arena, there were simply too few repositories of black history. Too few museums reminded people of the contributions, and sacrifices, of African Americans; too few centers embraced black culture and portrayed African Americans in a positive light. History books tended to overlook the triumphs of black Americans.”

He credited many with offering ideas for the museum and helping to get it up and running: high school principal Gloria Washington; Mercer University professor Bobby Jones; contractor and county commissioner Albert Billingslea, as well as his wife Margaret; Pearlie and John T Oliver, a bank vice president and state government official, respectively; and Maureen Walker, then director of the Ruth Hartley Mosley Center, who encouraged him to go for it.

The museum moved to its new location, on Cherry Street, across from the Georgia Sports Hall of Fame, in 2015. Its directors say it is the largest museum in the Southeast devoted to African-American art, history and culture.

== Art ==
=== Galleries & Exhibitions ===
The Tubman museum offers an array of galleries and exhibitions, including From Africa to America a mural by contemporary Macon artist Wilfred Stroud. The mural portrays events from Africa to America which started in 1619. It also offers galleries such as I Dream a World: Portraits of Black Women Who Changed America and Sankofa: A Century of African American Expression in the Decorative Arts. The museum offers many different art collections such as The Mural, Inventors Gallery, Local History, Folk Art and Black Artist of Georgia.

== See also ==
- List of museums focused on African Americans
