= Middle Georgia Raceway =

Former stock car racing track

Middle Georgia Speedway
- Location: 4015 US-41; Byron, Georgia; United States
- Coordinates: 32°40′8.00″N 83°42′45.93″W
- Opened: 1966
- Closed: c.1986
- Construction cost: $500,000
- Major events: NASCAR

Oval
- Surface: Paved
- Length: 0.882 km (.548 mi)
- Turns: 4

The Middle Georgia Raceway was a raceway located in Byron, Georgia. Nine NASCAR Grand National Series races were held at the track between 1966 and 1971. Richard Petty won four races, Bobby Allison won three, and David Pearson and Bobby Isaac each earned one victory.

== History ==
=== NASCAR history ===
Opened in 1966 at a cost of $500,000, the first race, the Speedy Morelock 200 NASCAR Grand National stock car race, became the location of a speed record when Richard Petty broke the half-mile NASCAR record for half-mile tracks with an average speed of 82.023 miles per hour during the 100-mile (160 km) event. The next year, federal agents from the Bureau of Alcohol, Tobacco, Firearms and Explosives discovered a moonshine distillery in an underground bunker at turn three. Petty returned to win the 150-mile (240 km) NASCAR race during the following season.

NASCAR began its 1968 season at the track. LeeRoy Yarbrough sat on the pole position and Bobby Allison won the 267-mile (430 km) race. Later that year, David Pearson won a 150-mile (240 km) race from the pole. NASCAR's 1969 season again began at the track. Pearson qualified on the pole and Petty won his third race at the track. He covered the 250 miles (400 km) with a speed of 85.121 miles per hour (136.989 km/h) which was the fastest in the track's NASCAR history. In the middle of the season, Bobby Isaac won the second of the three NASCAR races held at the track in a 300 lap event. He beat pole-sitter Pearson by 4 seconds and they were the only two cars on the lead lap. The final race was held near the end of the year. Isaac sat on the pole after recording a 98.148-mile-per-hour (157.954 km/h) lap, which was the fastest in the track's history. Allison won the 274-mile (441 km) event in a 1969 Dodge. One of Richard Petty's 4 wins at the track came when he was very ill and was questionable to race.

The 1970 Georgia 500 also occurred at the track. Petty started on the pole position and won the 274-mile (441 km) race. The final NASCAR race was held on November 7, 1971. Bobby Allison drove from the pole to win the 274-mile (441 km) race.

=== Other ===
Over the Fourth of July weekend in 1970, the second annual Atlanta International Pop Festival was held in a soybean field adjacent to the track. Jimi Hendrix, the Allman Brothers Band and over 30 other acts performed in front of an estimated crowd of 400,000 concertgoers (the town had a population of about 2,000). Seven years later, it was the location for filming of race scenes of the Richard Pryor film Greased Lightning about Wendell Scott. A few years ago, it was purchased with the goal of converting it to a land development site. After the economy crashed, plans were placed on hold. On September 15, 2012, an official Georgia Historical Society marker was placed near the raceway to commemorate the 1970 pop festival.

There was a big crash at the track in which the barricade went through driver Sonny Braswell's car and broke 14 bones. He proposed to his wife before the race.

in 1984 the Arca Racing Series ran at the track and the race was won by Davey Allison

Ken Ragan, father of 2-Time NASCAR Winner David Ragan, won the final race at Middle Georgia Raceway, as said on Peacock's Lost Speedways, hosted by NASCAR On NBC Announcer Dale Earnhardt Jr.

In 2011, Dodge contacted the current owner and asked to use the track for an advertisement. After eleven days of filming for the Dodge Durango, filming wrapped up and the commercial was eventually aired. Although the current owner had placed a fresh coat of paint over the walls, Dodge "aged" the walls and even bought a local car for $2,000 and crashed it to add realism to the scenes. In the commercial, a sign stated that it was the Brixton Motor Speedway.
