= Fort Valley, Georgia =

Fort Valley
- City
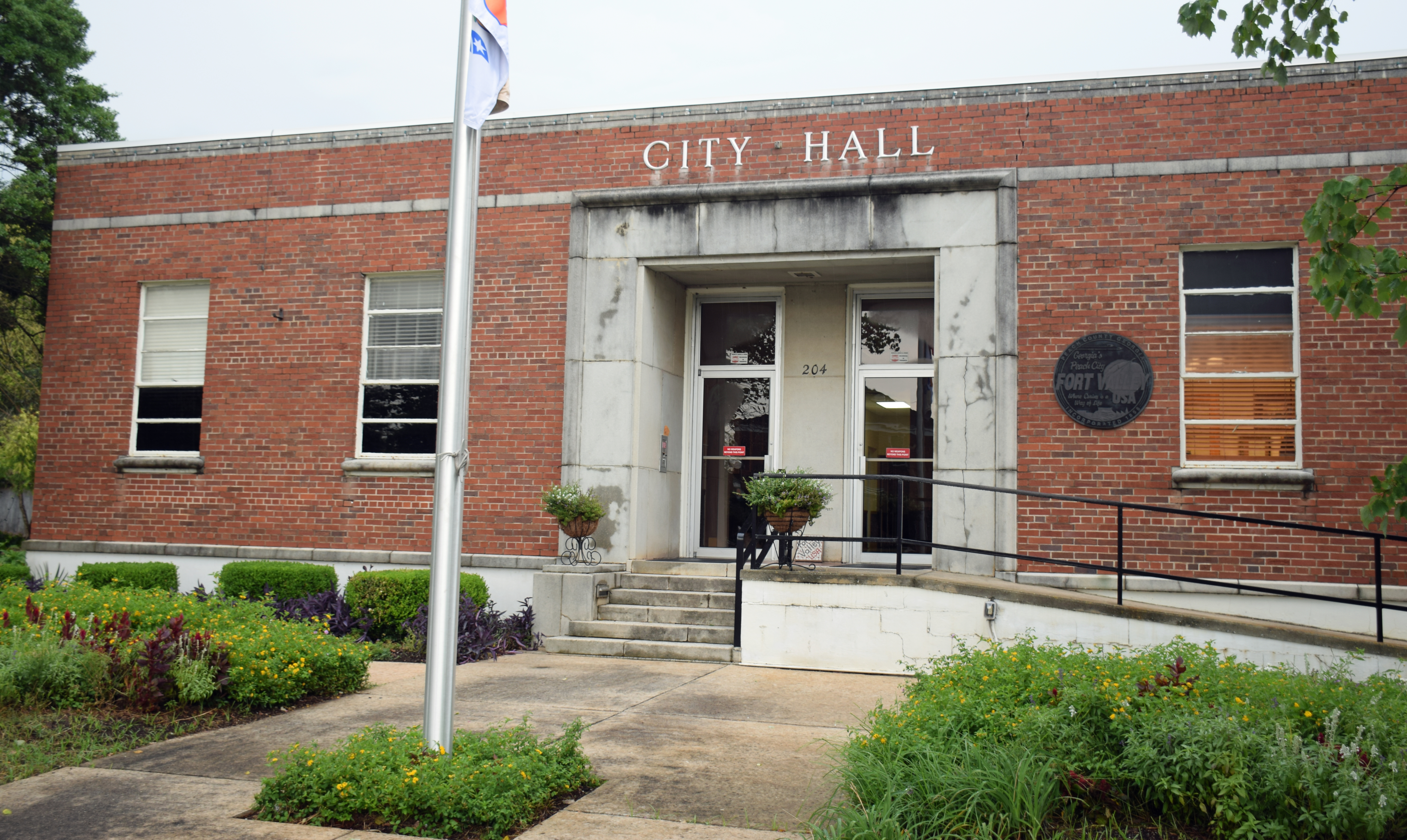
- Fort Valley City Hall

- Flag Seal
- Nickname: "Peach Capital of Georgia"
- Motto: "Where Caring Is A Way Of Life"
- Location in Peach County and the state of Georgia
- Coordinates: 32°33′N 83°53′W
- Country: United States
- State: Georgia
- County: Peach

Area
  - Total: 7.55 sq mi (19.56 km^{2})
  - Land: 7.54 sq mi (19.52 km^{2})
  - Water: 0.015 sq mi (0.04 km^{2})
- Elevation: 518 ft (158 m)

Population (2020)
  - Total: 8,780
  - Density: 1,164.8/sq mi (449.73/km^{2})
- Time zone: UTC-5 (Eastern (EST))
  - Summer (DST): UTC-4 (EDT)
- ZIP code: 31030
- Area code: 478
- FIPS code: 13-31096
- GNIS feature ID: 0355881
- Website: Fort Valley website

Fort Valley is a city in and the county seat of Peach County, Georgia, United States. As of the 2020 census, the city had a population of 8,780.

The city is in the Warner Robins metropolitan area and the Macon–Warner Robins combined statistical area.

== History ==
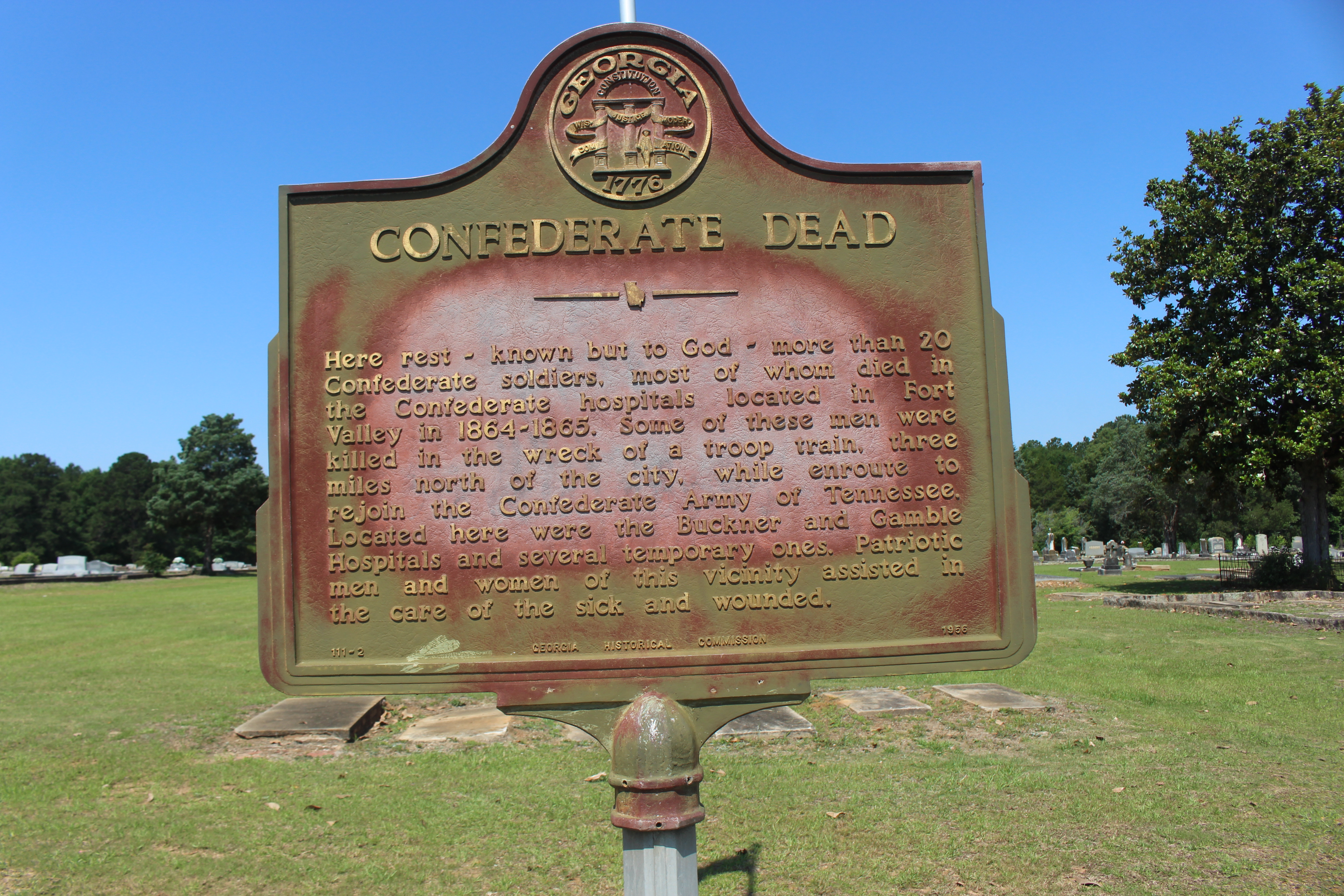
Oak Lawn Cemetery, which has graves of Confederate soldiers

The town's name is a mystery, as it has never had a fort. Historians believe that the name was mistakenly changed in a transcription error when the post office was named; the area was originally thought to have been called Fox Valley.

Founded in 1836, Fort Valley was incorporated as a town in 1854 and as a city in 1907. In 1924 it was the designated seat of the newly formed Peach County.

Fort Valley was the backdrop for a Life feature story in the March 22, 1943, edition. The World War II-era story focused on the town's sponsoring of the "Ham and Egg Show," a contest held by African-American farmers to highlight ham and poultry production in Peach County, Georgia.

== Geography ==
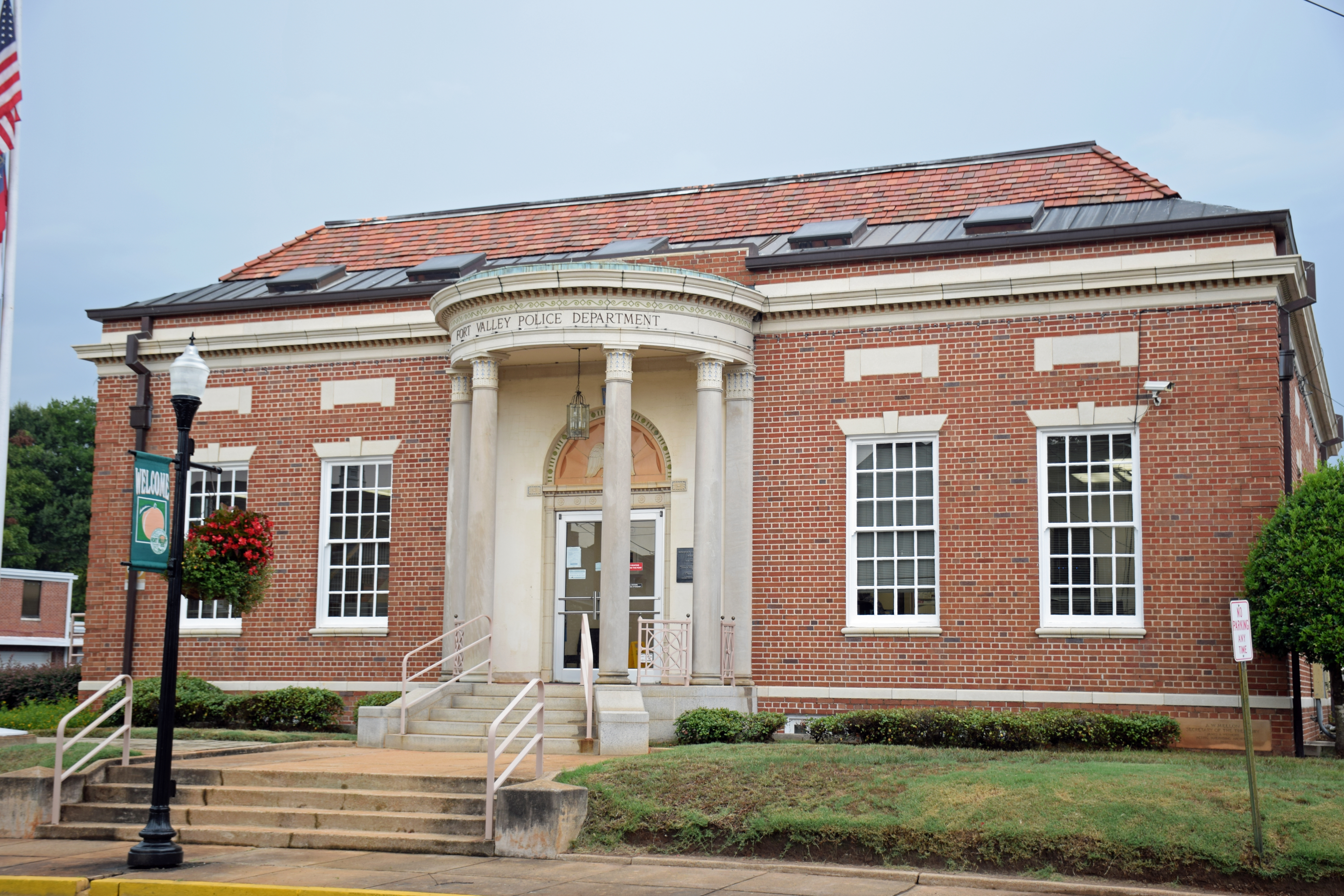
Police department

The city is located in the central part of the state along U.S. Route 341, which is the main route through the city. Via U.S. 341, Roberta is 15 mi (24 km) northwest, and Perry is 12 mi (19 km) southeast. Georgia State Routes 49, 96, and 540 (Fall Line Freeway) also run through the city. GA-49 leads northeast 11 mi (18 km) to Byron and southwest 8 mi (13 km) to Marshallville. GA-96 leads east 16 mi (26 km) to Warner Robins and west 13 mi (21 km) to Reynolds. The Fall Line Freeway runs north of the city as a four-lane divided highway, leading northeast to Byron with GA-49 and west to Reynolds with GA-96.

According to the United States Census Bureau, the city has a total area of 5.3 square miles (14 km^{2}), all land.

== Demographics ==
Historical population
Census	Pop.	Note	%±
1870	1,333		—
1880	1,277		−4.2%
1890	1,752		37.2%
1900	2,022		15.4%
1910	2,697		33.4%
1920	3,223		19.5%
1930	4,560		41.5%
1940	4,953		8.6%
1950	6,820		37.7%
1960	8,310		21.8%
1970	9,251		11.3%
1980	9,000		−2.7%
1990	8,198		−8.9%
2000	8,005		−2.4%
2010	9,815		22.6%
2020	8,780		−10.5%
2025 (est.)	9,220	▲	5.0%
U.S. Decennial Census; 1850-1870 1870-1880; 1890-1910 1920-1930; 1940 1950 1960; 1970 1980 1990; 2000 2010; 2025

=== 2020 census ===
Fort Valley racial composition
Race	Num.	Perc.
White (non-Hispanic)	992	11.3%
Black or African American (non-Hispanic)	6,825	77.73%
Native American	14	0.16%
Asian	23	0.26%
Pacific Islander	1	0.01%
Other/Mixed	213	2.43%
Hispanic or Latino	712	8.11%

As of the 2020 census, Fort Valley had a population of 8,780. The median age was 28.8 years. 22.7% of residents were under the age of 18 and 13.6% of residents were 65 years of age or older. For every 100 females there were 84.5 males, and for every 100 females age 18 and over there were 78.5 males age 18 and over.

99.1% of residents lived in urban areas, while 0.9% lived in rural areas.

There were 3,084 households in Fort Valley, and there were 1,685 families residing in the city. Of all households, 33.4% had children under the age of 18 living in them, 21.3% were married-couple households, 22.9% were households with a male householder and no spouse or partner present, and 49.6% were households with a female householder and no spouse or partner present. About 35.1% of all households were made up of individuals and 13.9% had someone living alone who was 65 years of age or older.

There were 3,730 housing units, of which 17.3% were vacant. The homeowner vacancy rate was 3.9% and the rental vacancy rate was 9.8%.

=== 2000 census ===
As of the census of 2000, there were 8,005 people, 3,050 households, and 1,878 families residing in the city. The population density was 1,519.5 inhabitants per square mile (586.7/km^{2}). There were 3,303 housing units at an average density of 627.0 per square mile (242.1/km^{2}). The racial makeup of the city was 22.10% White, 74.65% African American, 0.37% Native American, 0.25% Asian, 0.05% Pacific Islander, 1.85% from other races, and 0.72% from two or more races. Hispanic or Latino people of any race were 4.37% of the population.

There were 3,050 households, out of which 30.6% had children under the age of 18 living with them, 25.9% were married couples living together, 30.9% had a female householder with no husband present, and 38.4% were non-families. 29.1% of all households were made up of individuals, and 10.4% had someone living alone who was 65 years of age or older. The average household size was 2.57 and the average family size was 3.20.

In the city, the population was spread out, with 27.3% under the age of 18, 16.9% from 18 to 24, 26.0% from 25 to 44, 18.3% from 45 to 64, and 11.4% who were 65 years of age or older. The median age was 28 years. For every 100 females, there were 86.1 males. For every 100 females age 18 and over, there were 81.8 males.

The median income for a household in the city was $19,646, and the median income for a family was $24,206. Males had a median income of $27,016 versus $20,110 for females. The per capita income for the city was $10,815. About 31.8% of families and 37.7% of the population were below the poverty line, including 44.3% of those under the age of 18 and 17.3% of those 65 and older.

== Economy ==
Fort Valley is the corporate headquarters of the Blue Bird Corporation, a large manufacturer of activity buses and school buses, which opened its first Fort Valley facility in 1935.

== Athletics ==
=== Football ===
Despite being a city of less than 10,000 people, Fort Valley boasts one of the best football teams in the state. The Peach County High Trojans have played in eight state title games since 1990, and have made the playoffs every year since.

- 1992 AAA State Runners-Up
- 1998 AAA State Runners-Up
- 2003 AAA State Runners-Up
- 2005 AAA State Champions
- 2006 AAA State Champions
- 2009 AAA State Champions
- 2011 AAA State Runners-Up
- 2017 AAA State Runners-Up

=== Track and field ===
- 1993 AAA 4x100 Relay State Champions (Greg Streeter, Jacquez Green, Marcus Robinson, Melvin Oats)

== Arts and culture ==
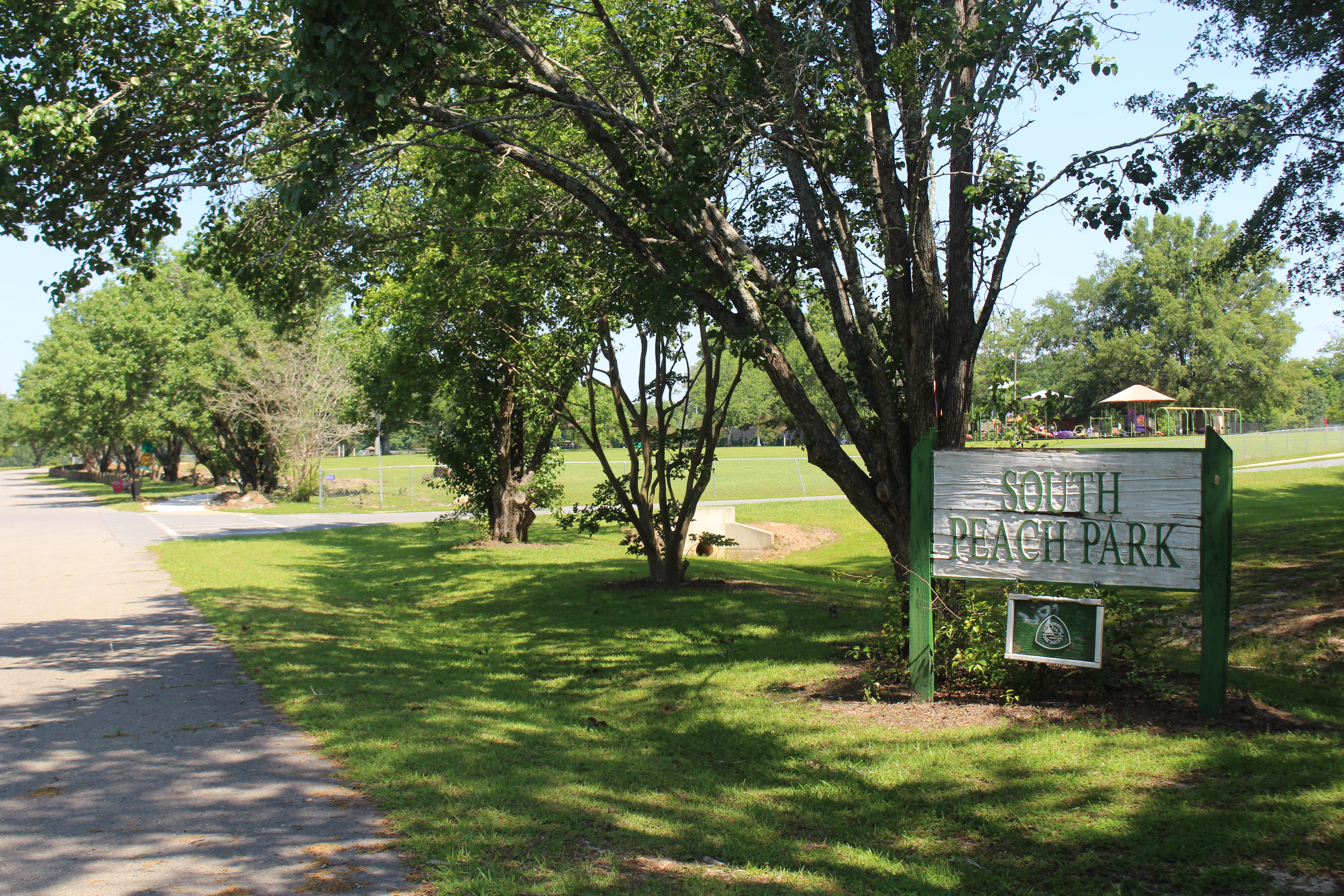
South Peach Park

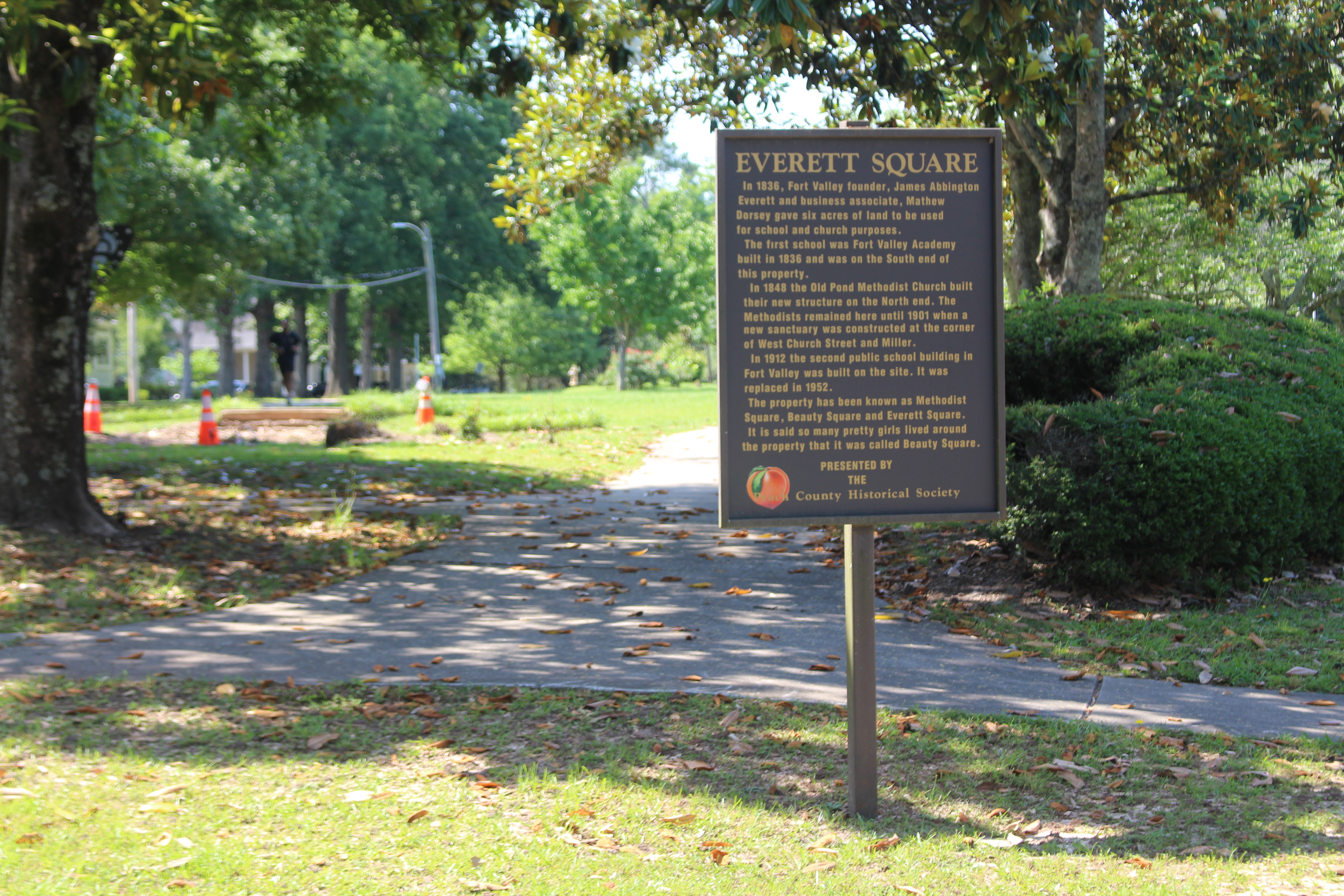
Everett Square

=== Points of interest ===
- Massee Lane Gardens
- Blue Bird Corporation's headquarters, currently its only Georgia plant

The municipal government owns Goodwill Cemetery and Oaklawn Cemetery. The former was historically for African-Americans.

== Education ==
=== Public schools ===
The Peach County School District holds grades pre-school to grade twelve, and consists of three elementary schools, two middle schools, and a high school. The district has 270 full-time teachers and over 3,927 students.

- Byron Elementary School
- Hunt Elementary School
- Kay Road Elementary School
- Byron Middle School
- Fort Valley Middle School
- Peach County High School

=== Colleges and universities ===
The city is home to Fort Valley State University, a historically black college.

== Infrastructure ==
A water tower in Fort Valley

=== Transportation ===
==== Highways ====
U.S. Route:

- U.S. Route 341

State Routes:

- State Route 7
- State Route 42
- State Route 49
- State Route 96

=== Health care ===
- The Medical Center of Peach County

== Notable people ==
- Louie Crew (1936–2019), emeritus professor at Rutgers University, poet and activist, taught at Fort Valley State from 1973 to 1979
- Antone Davis (born 1967), former National Football League offensive lineman
- Jacquez Green (born 1976), former National Football League wide receiver and punt returner
- Dick Hartley (1900–1978), college football player for the Georgia Bulldogs during 1920 and 1921
- Alvin Holsey (born 1965), United States Navy admiral, retired
- Harold Houser (1897–1981), United States Navy Rear admiral, and the 35th Governor of American Samoa
- Edward H. Hurst (1916–1997), Brigadier general in the Marine Corps and recipient of Navy Cross
- Louis Ivory (born 1980), former college football running back, 2000 Walter Payton Award winner
- Kearis Jackson (born 1999), wide receiver for the Georgia Bulldogs
- Benny Johnson (1948–1988), NFL player
- Pete Johnson (born 1954), former NFL player
- Greg Lloyd (born 1965), former NFL player
- Danny Lockett (born 1964), former NFL player
- Randy McMichael (born 1979), former NFL player for the San Diego Chargers, Miami Dolphins, and the St. Louis Rams
- Marcus Robinson (born 1975), former National Football League wide receiver
- A. T. Walden (1885–1965), lawyer and civil rights leader
- Tim Watson (born 1970), former American football safety in the National Football League
