= Byron, Georgia =

- City
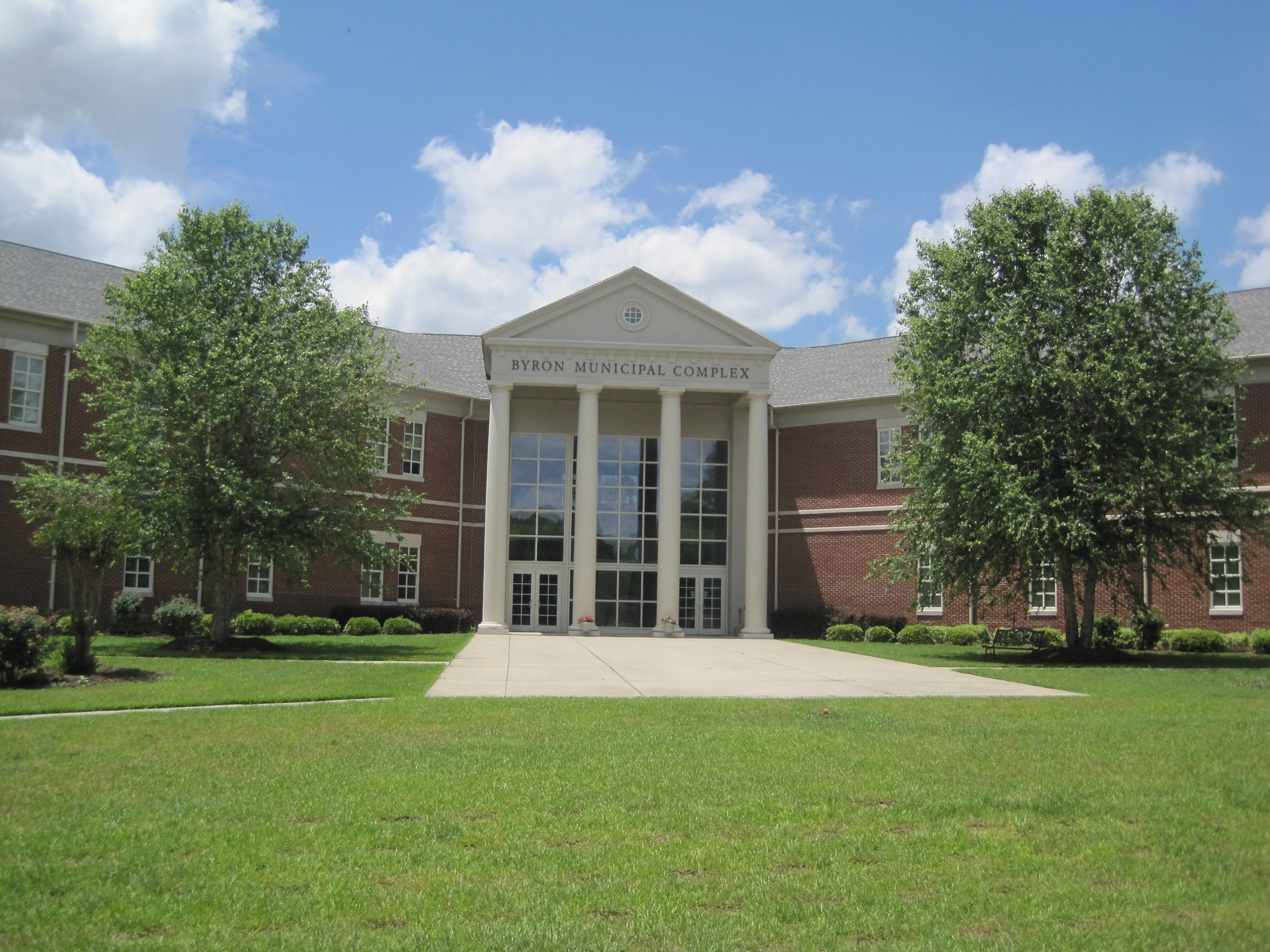
- Byron Municipal Complex

- Location in Peach County and the state of Georgia
- Coordinates: 32°38′56″N 83°45′20″W
- Country: United States
- State: Georgia
- Counties: Peach, Houston

Area
  - Total: 8.79 sq mi (22.77 km^{2})
  - Land: 8.76 sq mi (22.70 km^{2})
  - Water: 0.023 sq mi (0.06 km^{2})
- Elevation: 509 ft (155 m)

Population (2020)
  - Total: 5,702
  - Density: 650.5/sq mi (251.15/km^{2})
- Time zone: UTC-5 (Eastern (EST))
  - Summer (DST): UTC-4 (EDT)
- ZIP code: 31008
- Area code: 478
- FIPS code: 13-12260
- GNIS feature ID: 0354930
- Website: byronga.com

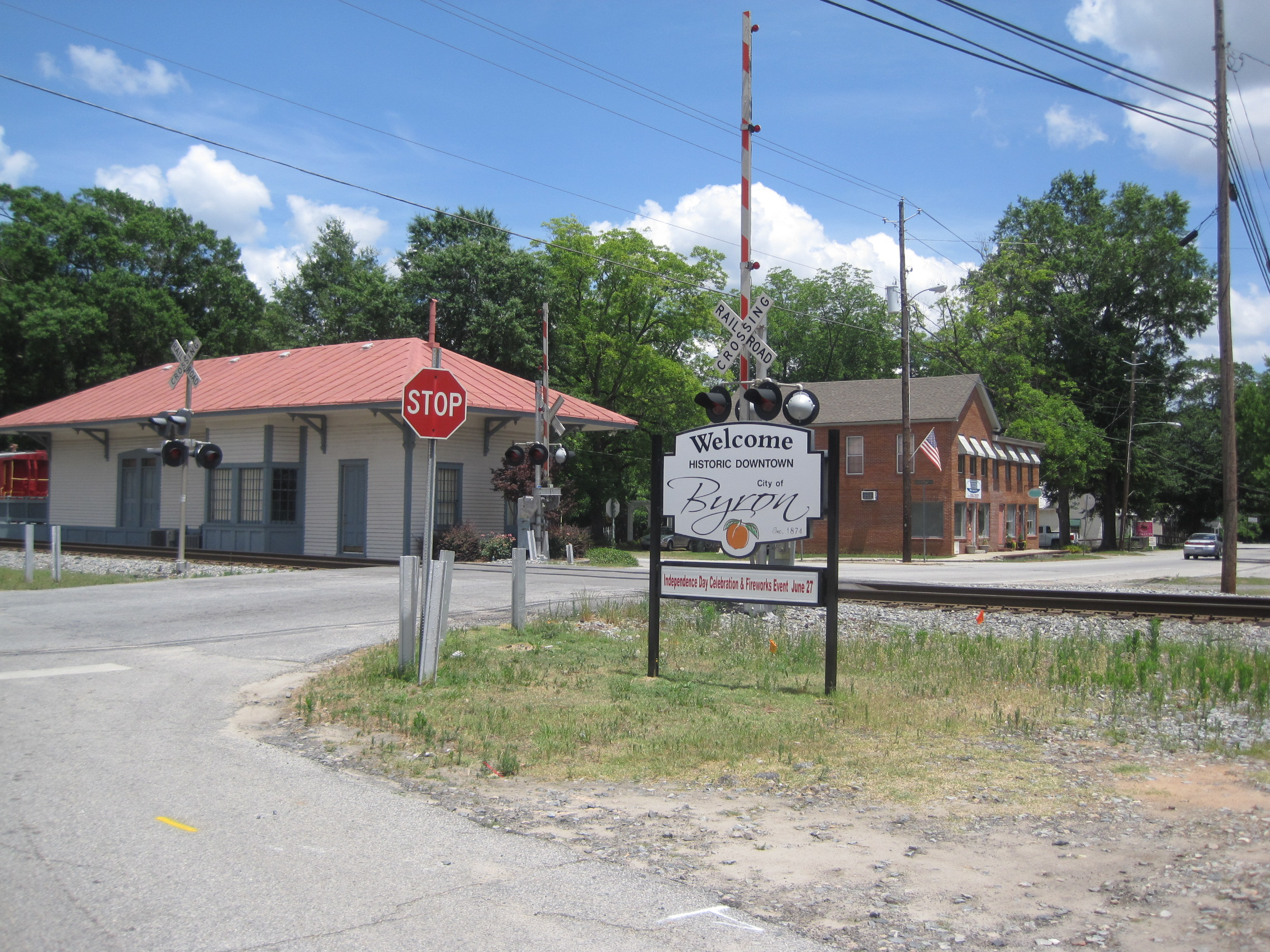
Main Street in downtown Byron

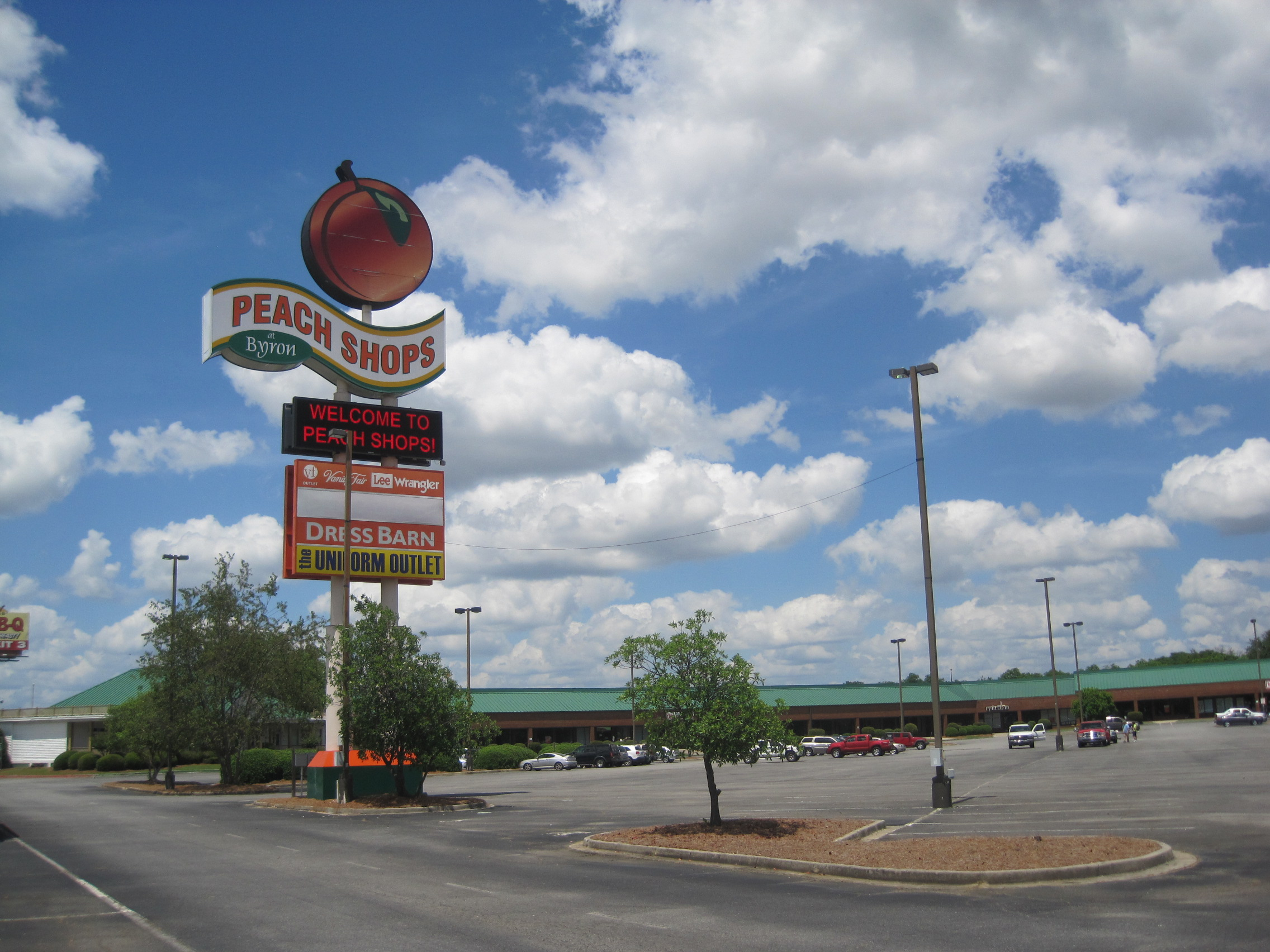
Peach Shops Outlet Mall beside I-75 in Byron

Byron is a city located primarily in Peach County, Georgia, United States. A small portion of the city also extends into parts of Houston and Crawford counties. As of the 2020 census, Byron had a population of 5,702. The city is in the Warner Robins metropolitan statistical area.

Byron was home to the Middle Georgia Raceway, an auto racetrack that hosted NASCAR races and the filming of TV commercials and a feature movie. From July 3–5, 1970, in a field next to the raceway, the Atlanta International Pop Festival was held, which was the largest gathering in Georgia history until the 1996 Olympics in Atlanta. On September 15, 2012, an official Georgia Historical Society marker was placed near the raceway site to commemorate the festival.

== History ==
The community was named after Lord Byron, the British Romantic poet. A former variant name was "Jackson", but the name was changed in order to avoid repetition with the Jackson in Butts County. The Georgia General Assembly incorporated the place as the "Town of Byron" in 1874. Detailed history can be found at the Byron Historic Train Depot.

== Geography ==
Byron is located in the northeast corner of Peach County at 32°38′56″N 83°45′20″W (32.648908, -83.755640), near the geographic center of Georgia. Interstate 75 passes through the eastern side of the city, with access from Exits 146 and 149 (Georgia State Route 49). Byron is 93 miles (150 km) south of Atlanta, 16 miles (26 km) south of Macon, and 11 miles (18 km) northeast of the Peach County seat of Fort Valley.

According to the United States Census Bureau, the city has a total area of 8.6 square miles (22.4 km^{2}), of which 0.02 square miles (0.06 km^{2}), or 0.28%, are water.

== Demographics ==
Historical population
Census	Pop.	Note	%±
1880	137		—
1930	318		—
1940	305		−4.1%
1950	379		24.3%
1960	1,138		200.3%
1970	1,368		20.2%
1980	1,661		21.4%
1990	2,276		37.0%
2000	2,887		26.8%
2010	4,512		56.3%
2020	5,702		26.4%
2025 (est.)	6,567	▲	15.2%
U.S. Decennial Census; 2025

=== 2020 census ===
As of the 2020 census, Byron had a population of 5,702. There were 1,588 families residing in the city.

The median age was 40.6 years. 21.7% of residents were under the age of 18 and 16.2% of residents were 65 years of age or older. For every 100 females there were 86.2 males, and for every 100 females age 18 and over there were 83.5 males age 18 and over.

97.6% of residents lived in urban areas, while 2.4% lived in rural areas.

There were 2,329 households in Byron, of which 31.9% had children under the age of 18 living in them. Of all households, 48.6% were married-couple households, 14.7% were households with a male householder and no spouse or partner present, and 31.8% were households with a female householder and no spouse or partner present. About 27.4% of all households were made up of individuals and 10.4% had someone living alone who was 65 years of age or older.

There were 2,492 housing units, of which 6.5% were vacant. The homeowner vacancy rate was 1.2% and the rental vacancy rate was 10.2%.

Byron racial composition as of 2020
Race	Num.	Perc.
White (non-Hispanic)	3,056	53.6%
Black or African American (non-Hispanic)	2,055	36.04%
Native American	12	0.21%
Asian	84	1.47%
Pacific Islander	1	0.02%
Other/Mixed	237	4.16%
Hispanic or Latino	257	4.51%

=== Demographic estimates ===
Circa 2023, of the 4,512 residents, all of them were in Peach County and none of them were in Houston County.

== Arts and culture ==
The city hosts the Battle of Byron, an annual charity fundraiser in May.

The city also has several other annual events. The Cup of Blue in April honors law enforcement and their families. The Georgia Peach Festival in June celebrates the Georgia peach split between Fort Valley, Ga and Byron, Ga. The Byron BBQ Fest in September features a BBQ competition.

The Byron Historic Train Depot is a local museum featuring local city history, artifacts, and photos. You can also go inside a Southern Railway bay window caboose. During the summer, the museum features an exhibit about the Second Atlanta International Pop Festival that happened in Byron, Ga.

== Education ==
Areas in Peach County are within the Peach County School District (as are all other parts of Peach County).

Areas in Houston County are within the Houston County School System (as are all other parts of Houston County). As of 2023 no residents of Byron lived in Houston County.
