= English Americans =

Americans of English birth or descent

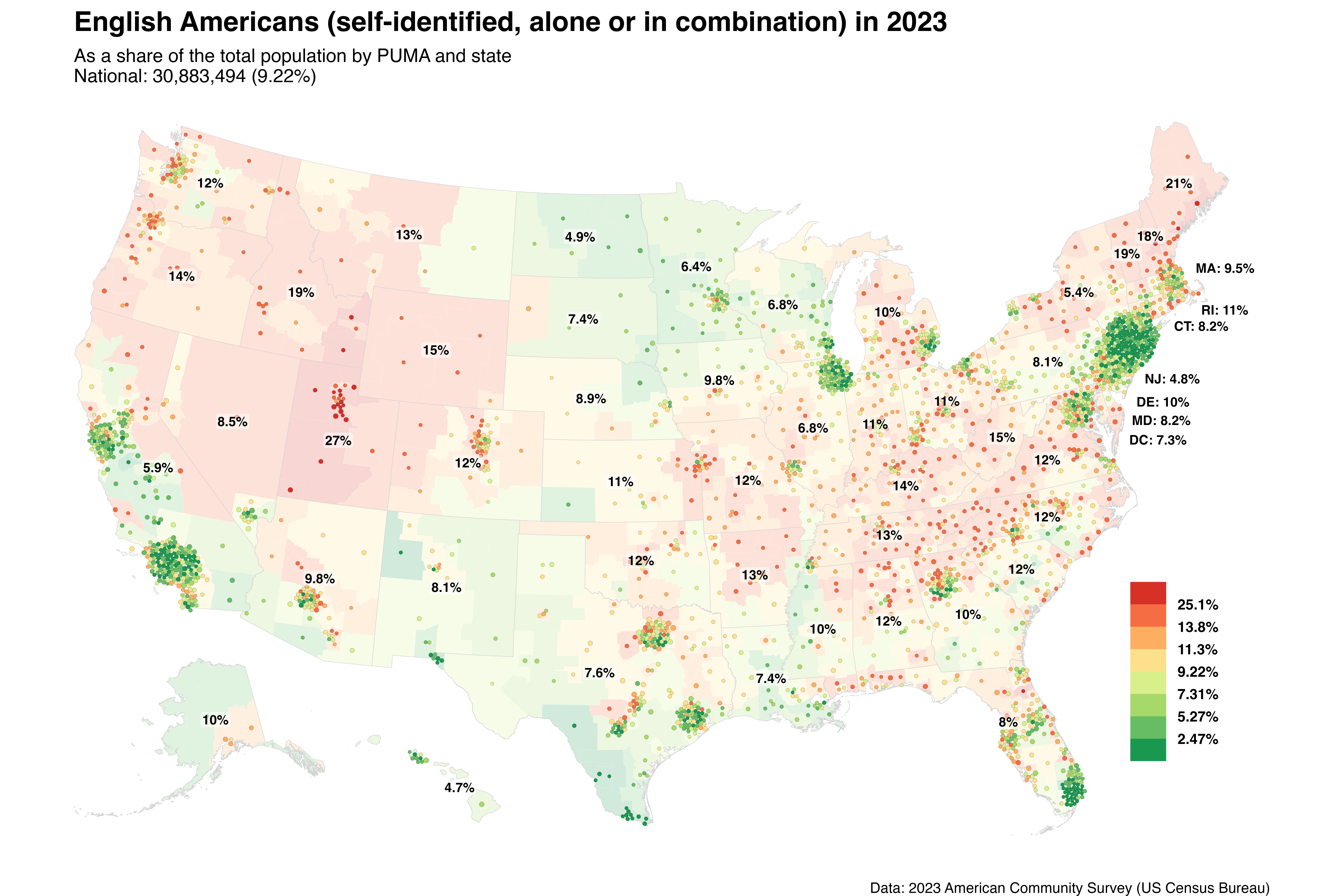

Total population
- Alone (one ancestry); 25,536,410 (2020 census); 7.70% of the total US population Alone or in combination 46,550,968 (2020 census); 14.04% of the total US population

Regions with significant populations
- Found Nationwide with significant populations in the South and New England
- California: 3,754,933
- Texas: 3,520,547
- Florida: 2,540,795
- Ohio: 2,037,771
- North Carolina: 1,869,609
- New York: 1,641,789
- Pennsylvania: 1,641,137
- Michigan: 1,637,351
- Georgia: 1,594,956
- Tennessee: 1,430,466

Languages
- English (American and English)

Religion
- Traditionally Christianity

Related ethnic groups
- Other English diaspora, American ancestry, White Anglo-Saxon Protestants, Old Stock Americans, other British Americans, White Americans, European Americans, Irish Americans, Scottish Americans, Welsh Americans, Cornish Americans, Scotch-Irish Americans, Dutch Americans, German Americans, French Americans, Scandinavian Americans

English Americans (also known as Anglo-Americans) are Americans whose ancestry originates wholly or partly in England. According to the 2020 United States census, English Americans are the largest ethnic demographic in the United States with 46.6 million Americans self-identifying as having some English origins (many combined with another heritage) representing (19.8%) of the White American population. This includes 25,536,410 (12.5% of whites) identified as predominantly or "English alone". Despite their status as the largest self-identified ancestral-origin group in the United States, demographers still regard the number of English Americans as an undercount. The term is distinct from British Americans, which includes not only English Americans but also others from the United Kingdom such as Scottish, Scotch-Irish (descendants of Ulster Scots from Ulster and Northern Ireland), Welsh, Cornish, Manx Americans and Channel Islanders. In 1980, 49.6 million Americans claimed English ancestry. At 26.34%, this was the largest group amongst the 188 million people who reported at least one ancestry. The population was 226 million which would have made the English ancestry group 22% of the total. English immigrants in the 19th century, as with other groups, sought economic prosperity. They began migrating in large numbers, without state support, in the 1840s and continued into the 1890s.

English American elites, known as "WASPs" (White Anglo-Saxon Protestants), have dominated American society, culture, and politics for most of American history. The majority of presidents of the United States, as well as the majority of sitting U.S. congressmen and congresswomen, were born into families of English ancestry. The majority of the Founding Fathers of the United States were also of English ancestry. Ivy League universities such as Harvard University, Yale University, and Princeton University were established by and have been mostly composed of WASPs. In states such as Texas, New Mexico, Louisiana, and California, former colonies of Spain and France, Anglo-American settlers developed a cohesive identity centered around their Protestantism, English language, and British colonial heritage. The term Anglo-American can be ambiguous and used in several different ways. While it is primarily intended to refer to people of English ancestry, it (along with terms like Anglo, Anglic, Anglophone, and Anglophonic) is also used to denote all people of British or Northwestern European ancestry. Most broadly it is used to include all people of Northwestern European ethnic origin who currently speak English as a mother tongue and their descendants who are in the New World, thus including a large assimilated group of mostly Protestant Europeans.

== Sense of identity ==
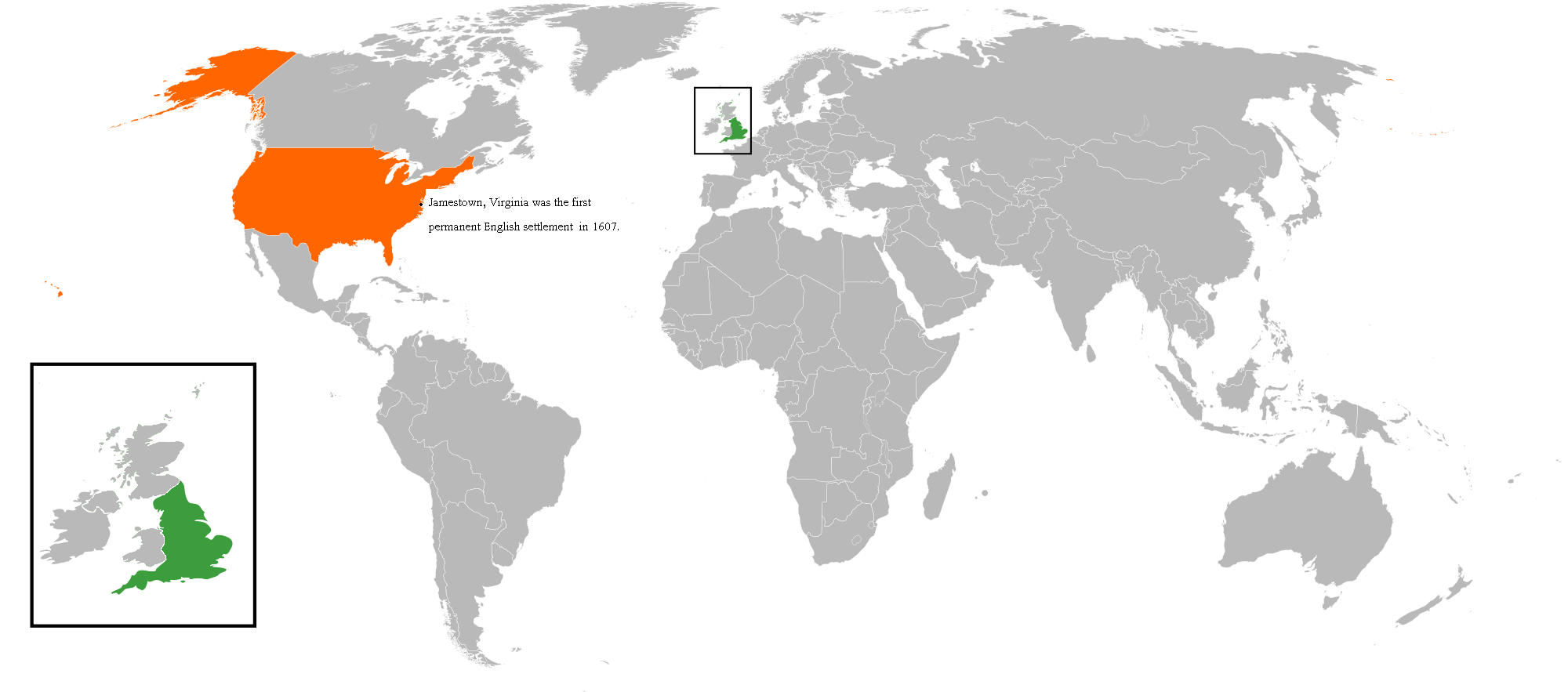
England United States. Shows the first permanent English settlement of Jamestown in 1607.

Americans of English heritage are often seen, and identify, as simply "American" due to the many historic cultural ties between England and the U.S. and their influence on the country's population. Relative to ethnic groups of other European origins, this may be due to the early establishment of English settlements; as well as to non-English groups having emigrated in order to establish significant communities.

Since 1776, English Americans have been less likely to proclaim their heritage, unlike other British Americans, Latino Americans, African Americans, Italian Americans, Irish Americans, Native Americans or other ethnic groups. This is a reason why numbers vary drastically between self-identification and estimates. A leading specialist, Charlotte Erickson, found them to be ethnically "invisible," dismissing the occasional St. George Societies as ephemeral elite clubs that were not in touch with a larger ethnic community. In Canada, by contrast, the English organized far more ethnic activism, as the English competed sharply with the well-organized French and Irish elements. In the United States, the Scottish immigrants were much better organized than the English in the 19th century, as were their descendants in the late 20th century.

== Number of English Americans ==
English origins response
Year	Single ancestry / alone	Totals / %	
1980	23,748,772	49,598,035	21.9
1990	-	32,651,788	13.1
2000	-	24,515,138	8.71
2010	-	27,403,063	9.02
2020	25,536,410	46,550,968	14.0

As the primary founding group, the original 17th-century settlers were overwhelmingly English. Most of these early settlers came from what is referred to as Southern England.

The largest migration from the British Isles occurred in the 18th century, and consisted of around 250,000 settlers of mainly Northern English and Scottish origin. From the time of the first permanent English presence in the New World until the 1900s, these migrants and their descendants outnumbered all others firmly establishing the English cultural pattern as predominant for the American version.

=== 1700–1775 ===
According to studies and estimates, the ethnic populations in the British American Colonies from 1700 onwards were: (*Georgia not included)

Ethnic composition of the American Colonies
1700 / %		1755 / %		1775 / %	
English / Welsh	80.0	English / Welsh	52.0	English	48.7
African	11.0	African	20.0	African	20.0
Dutch	4.0	German	7.0	Scots-Irish	7.8
Scottish	3.0	Scots-Irish	7.0	German	6.9
Other European	2.0	Irish	5.0	Scottish	6.6
—N/a	—N/a	Scottish	4.0	Dutch	2.7
—N/a	—N/a	Dutch	3.0	French	1.4
—N/a	—N/a	Other European	2.0	Swedish	0.6
—N/a	—N/a	—N/a	—N/a	Other	5.3
Colonies*	100.0	Thirteen Colonies	100.0	United Colonies	100.0

Colonial English origin 1776
Colonies	% of population
New England	70.5
Middle	40.6
Southern	37.4

== Data ==
=== National origins: 1790–1900 ===
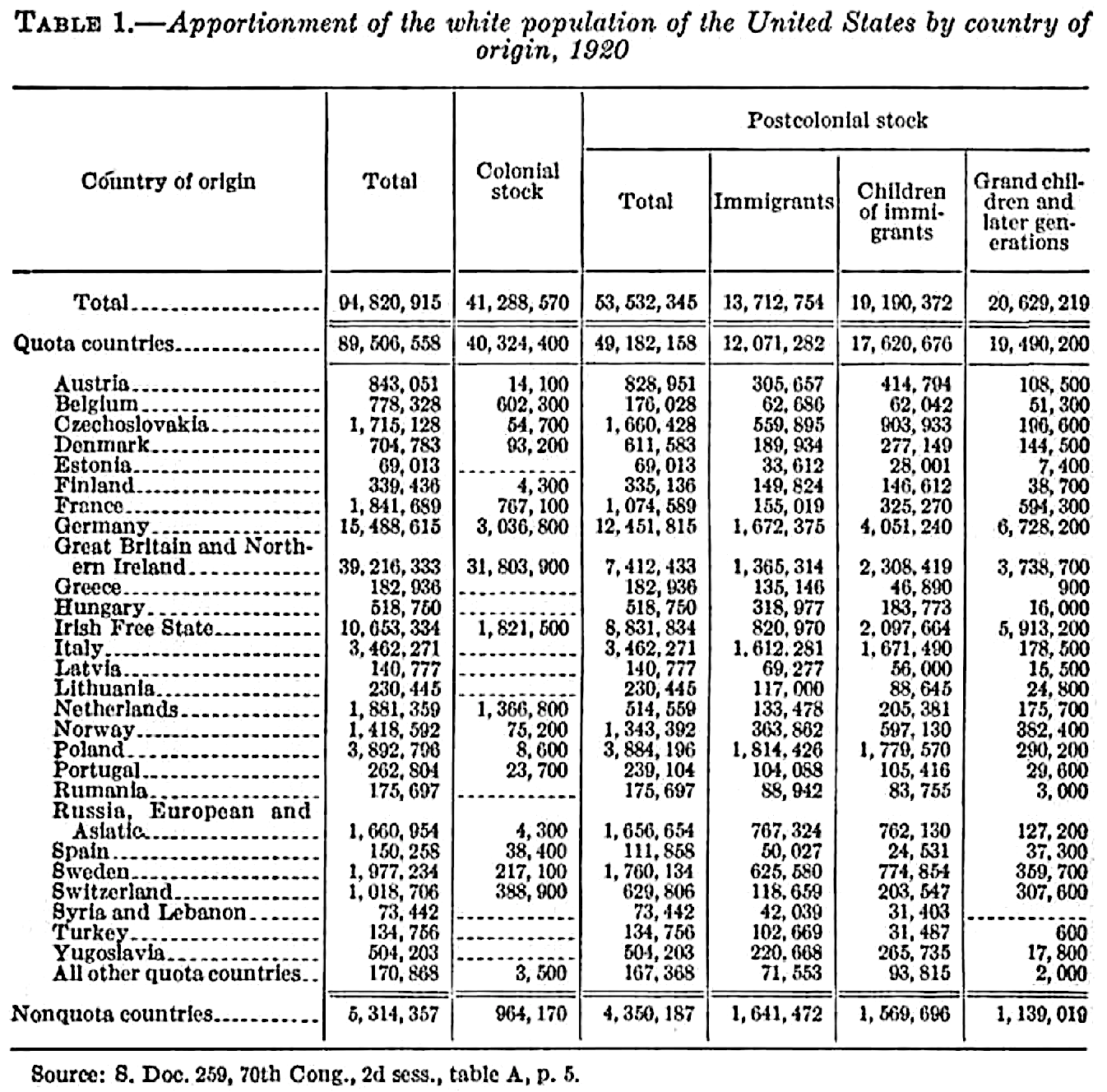
The White Population of the United States in 1920, apportioned according to the National Origins Formula prescribed by §11(c) of the Immigration Act of 1924. About 43.5% of White Americans were deemed to be of colonial stock descended from the population enumerated in 1790, more than 3/4 of whom from Great Britain.

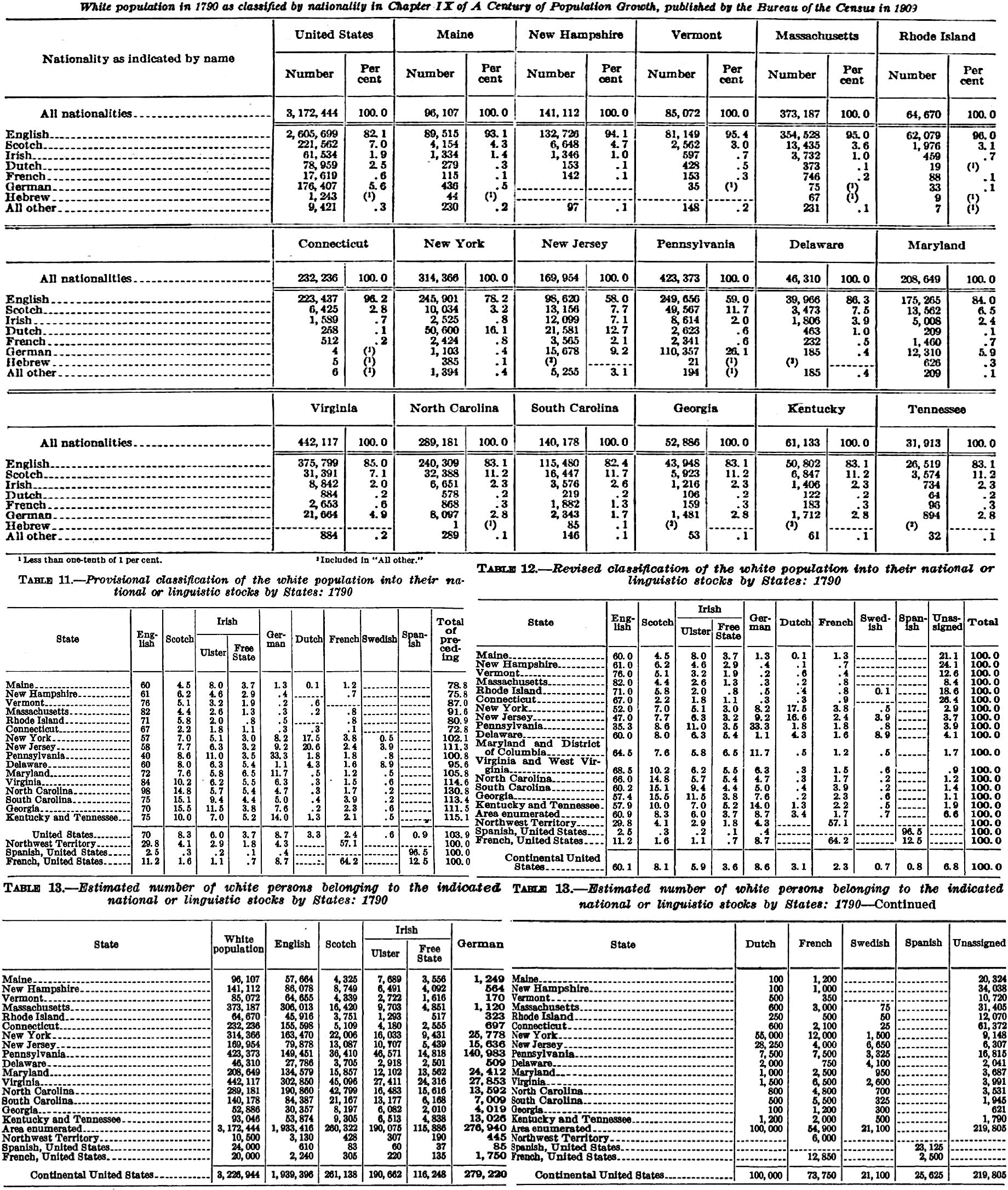
European Americans in 1790, by nationality, according to the preliminary Century of Population Growth estimate in 1909 (top half) and revised American Council of Learned Societies study estimates accepted by the Census Bureau in 1929 (bottom half).

The ancestries of the population in 1790 (the first national population census) has been estimated by various sources, first in 1909, then again in 1932, 1980 and 1984 by sampling distinctive surnames in the census and assigning them a country of origin. There is debate over the accuracy between the studies with individual scholars and the Federal Government using different techniques and conclusion for the ethnic composition.

A study published in 1909 titled A Century of Population Growth. From the First to the Twelfth census of the United States: 1790–1900 by the Government Census Bureau estimated the English were 83.5%, 6.7% Scottish, 1.6% Irish, 2.0% Dutch, 0.5% French, 5.6% German and 0.1% all others of the white population for the 12 enumerated states. "Hebrews" (Jews) were less than one-tenth of 1 percent. When the Scotch and Irish are added, British origins would be more than 90% of the European ancestry.

The same 1909 data for each state (of the total European population only) of English ancestry were Connecticut 96.2%, Rhode Island 96.0%, Vermont 95.4%, Massachusetts 95.0%, New Hampshire 94.1%, Maine 93.1%, Virginia 85.0%, Maryland 84.0%, North Carolina 83.1%, South Carolina 82.4%, New York 78.2% and Pennsylvania 59.0%. CPG estimated that, of all European Americans in the Continental United States as of 1790, 82.1% were English, followed by 7.0% Scotch, 5.6% German, 2.5% Dutch, 1.9% Irish, and 0.6% French.

==== English American population estimates (1790) ====
The 1909 Century of Population Growth report came under intense scrutiny in the 1920s; its methodology was subject to criticism over fundamental flaws that cast doubt on the accuracy of its conclusions. The catalyst for controversy had been passage of the Immigration Act of 1924, which imposed numerical quotas on each country of Europe limiting the number of immigrants to be admitted out of a finite total annual pool. The size of each national quota was determined by the National Origins Formula, in part computed by estimating the origins of the colonial stock population descended from White Americans enumerated in the 1790 Census.

The undercount of other colonial stocks like German Americans and Irish Americans would thus have contemporary policy consequences. When CPG was produced in 1909, the concept of independent Ireland did not even exist. CPG made no attempt to further classify its estimated 1.9% Irish population to distinguish Celtic Irish Catholics of Gaelic Ireland, who in 1922 formed the independent Irish Free State, from the Scotch-Irish descendants of Ulster Scots and Anglo-Irish of the Plantation of Ulster, which became Northern Ireland and remained part of the United Kingdom. In 1927, proposed immigration quotas based on CPG figures were rejected by the President's Committee chaired by the Secretaries of State, Commerce, and Labor, with the President reporting to Congress "the statistical and historical information available raises grave doubts as to the whole value of these computations as the basis for the purposes intended." Among the criticisms of A Century of Population Growth:

- CPG failed to account for Anglicization of names, assuming any surname that could be English was actually English
- CPG failed to consider first names even when obviously foreign, assuming anyone with a surname that could be English was actually English
- CPG started by classifying all names as Scotch, Irish, Dutch, French, German, Hebrew, or other. All remaining names which could not be classed with one of the 6 other listed nationalities, nor identified by the Census clerk as too exotic to be English, were assumed to be English
- CPG classification was an unscientific process by Census clerks with no training in history, genealogy, or linguistics, nor were scholars in those fields consulted
- CPG estimates were produced by a linear process with no checks on potential errors nor opportunity for peer review or scholarly revision once an individual clerk had assigned a name to a nationality

At the time of the first census in 1790, English was the majority ancestry in all U.S. states, ranging from a high of 96.2% in Connecticut to a low of 58.0% in New Jersey.

Ancestries of Each U.S. State in 1790 - A Century of Population Growth
State	English %	Scotch %	Irish %	Dutch %	French %	German %	Other %
Maine	93.1	4.3	1.4	0.3	0.1	0.5	0.3
New Hampshire	94.1	4.7	1.0	0.1	0.1	0.0	0.0
Vermont	95.4	3.0	0.7	0.5	0.2	0.0	0.2
Massachusetts	95.0	3.6	1.0	0.1	0.2	0.0	0.1
Rhode Island	96.0	3.1	0.7	0.0	0.1	0.1	0.0
Connecticut	96.2	2.8	0.7	0.1	0.2	0.0	0.0
New York	78.2	3.2	0.8	16.1	0.8	0.4	0.5
New Jersey	58.0	7.7	7.1	12.7	2.1	9.2	3.2
Delaware	86.3	7.5	3.9	1.0	0.5	0.4	0.4
Pennsylvania	59.0	11.7	2.0	0.6	0.6	26.1	0.0
Maryland	84.0	6.5	2.4	0.1	0.7	5.9	0.4
Virginia	85.0	7.1	2.0	0.2	0.6	4.9	0.2
Kentucky	83.1	11.2	2.3	0.2	0.3	2.8	0.1
Tennessee	83.1	11.2	2.3	0.2	0.3	2.8	0.1
North Carolina	83.1	11.2	2.3	0.2	0.3	2.8	0.1
South Carolina	82.4	11.7	2.6	0.1	1.3	1.7	0.2
(Georgia (U.S. state)) Georgia	83.1	11.2	2.3	0.2	0.3	2.8	0.1

Concluding that CPG "had not been accepted by scholars as better than a first approximation of the truth", the Census Bureau commissioned a study to produce new scientific estimates of the colonial American population, in collaboration with the American Council of Learned Societies, in time to be adopted as basis for legal immigration quotas in 1929, and later published in the journal of the American Historical Association, reproduced in the table below. Note: as in the original CPG report, the "English" category encompassed England and Wales, grouping together all names classified as either "Anglican" (from England) or "Cambrian" (from Wales).

Estimated English American population in the Continental United States as of the 1790 Census.

State or Territory	(England) English (Note: includes Welsh)	
State or Territory	#	%
Connecticut	155,598	67.00%
Delaware	27,786	60.00%
Georgia	30,357	57.40%
Kentucky & (Tennessee) Tenn.	53,874	57.90%
Maine	57,664	60.00%
Maryland	134,579	64.50%
Massachusetts	306,013	82.00%
New Hampshire	86,078	61.00%
New Jersey	79,878	47.00%
New York	163,470	52.00%
North Carolina	190,860	66.00%
Pennsylvania	149,451	35.30%
Rhode Island	45,916	71.00%
South Carolina	84,387	60.20%
Vermont	64,655	76.00%
Virginia	302,850	68.50%
(Thirteen Colonies) 1790 Census Area	1,933,416	60.94%
(Ohio) Northwest Territory	3,130	29.81%
(New France) French America	2,240	11.20%
(Spanish Empire) Spanish America	610	2.54%
United States	1,939,396	60.10%

Another source by Thomas L. Purvis in 1984 estimated that people of English ancestry made up about 47.5% of the total population or 60.9% of the European American or white population (his figures can also be found, and as divided by region, in Colin Bonwick, The American Revolution, 1991 p. 2540-839-1346-2). The study which gives similar results can be found in The American Revolution, Colin Bonwick in percentages for 1790: 47.9 English, 3.5 Welsh, 8.5 Scotch Irish (Ulster), 4.3 Scottish, 4.7 Irish (South), 7.2 German, 2.7 Dutch, 1.7 French, 0.2 Swedish, 19.3 Black, 103.4 British. The difference between the two estimates are found by comparing the ratios of the groups (adding and subtracting) to accommodate and adding the Welsh.

The category 'Irish' in the Bonwick study represents immigrants from Ireland outside the province of Ulster, the overwhelming majority of whom were Protestant and not ethnically Irish, though from Ireland. They were not Irish Catholics. By the time the American War for Independence started in 1776, Catholics were 1.6%, or 40,000 persons of the 2.5 million population of the 13 colonies. Some 80.7% of the total United States population was of European origin.

Using the first model above, in 1900, an estimated 28,375,000 or 37.8% of the population of the United States was wholly or partly of English ancestry from colonial roots. The estimate was based on the Census Bureaus Estimate that approximately thirty five million white Americans were descended from colonial forebears.

=== Census ===
==== 1980 ====
In 1980, 23,748,772 Americans claimed only English ancestry and another 25,849,263 claimed English along with another ethnic ancestry. 13.3 million or 5.9% of the total U.S. population chose to identify as "American" (counted under "not specified") as also seen in censuses that followed. Below shows the persons who reported at least one specific ancestry are as follows.

Response	Number	Percent	Northeast	North Central	South	West
Single ancestry	23,748,772	47.9	2,984,931	4,438,223	12,382,681	3,942,937
Multiple ancestry	25,849,263	52.1	5,190,045	7,099,961	7,235,689	6,323,568
Totals	49,598,035		8,174,976	11,538,184	19,618,370	10,266,505

==== 1990 ====
In 1990, the national level response rate for the question was high with 90.4% of the total United States population choosing at least one specific ancestry and 9.6% ignored the question completely. Of those who chose English, 66.9% of people chose it as their first response. Totals for the English showed a considerable decrease from the previous census. Responses for "American" slightly decreased both numerically and as a percentage from 5.9% to 5.2% in 1990 with most being from the South.

Response	Number	%
First ancestry	21,834,160	66.9
Second ancestry	10,817,628	33.1
Totals	32,651,788	

==== 2000 ====
In the 2000 census, 24.5 million or 8.7% of Americans reported English ancestry, a decline of some eight million people. At the national level, the response rate for the ancestry question fell to 80.1% of the total U.S. population, while 19.9% were unclassified or ignored the question completely. It was the fourth largest ancestral group. Some Cornish Americans may not identify as English American or British American, even though Cornwall had been part of England since long before their ancestors arrived in North America. Responses were:

Response	Population	Change 1990–2000
First ancestry	16,623,938	-24.9%
Second ancestry	7,885,754	-24.9%
Total	24,509,692	-24.9%

==== 2010 ACS ====
In 2010, the official census did not include a question on origins or ancestry. However, the American Community Survey enumerated Americans reporting English ancestry at 27.4 million, 9.0% of the U.S. population; in 2015, 24.8 million, 7.8% of the population. A decade thereafter, in 2020, the U.S. Census Bureau recorded 25.2 million Americans reporting full or partial English ancestry, about 7.7% of the U.S. population.

==== 2020 ====
Results for the 2020 United States census showed that English Americans were the largest group in the United States where 25,536,410 (12.5%) identified as "English alone" with a further 21 million choosing English combined with another ethnic origin. The total is 46,550,968 Americans self-identifying as being of English origin representing (19.8%) of the White American alone or in any combination population.

Census response	Population
Origin alone	25,536,410
Origin combined with another	21,014,558
Total	46,550,968

== Geographical distribution ==
=== 1980 ===
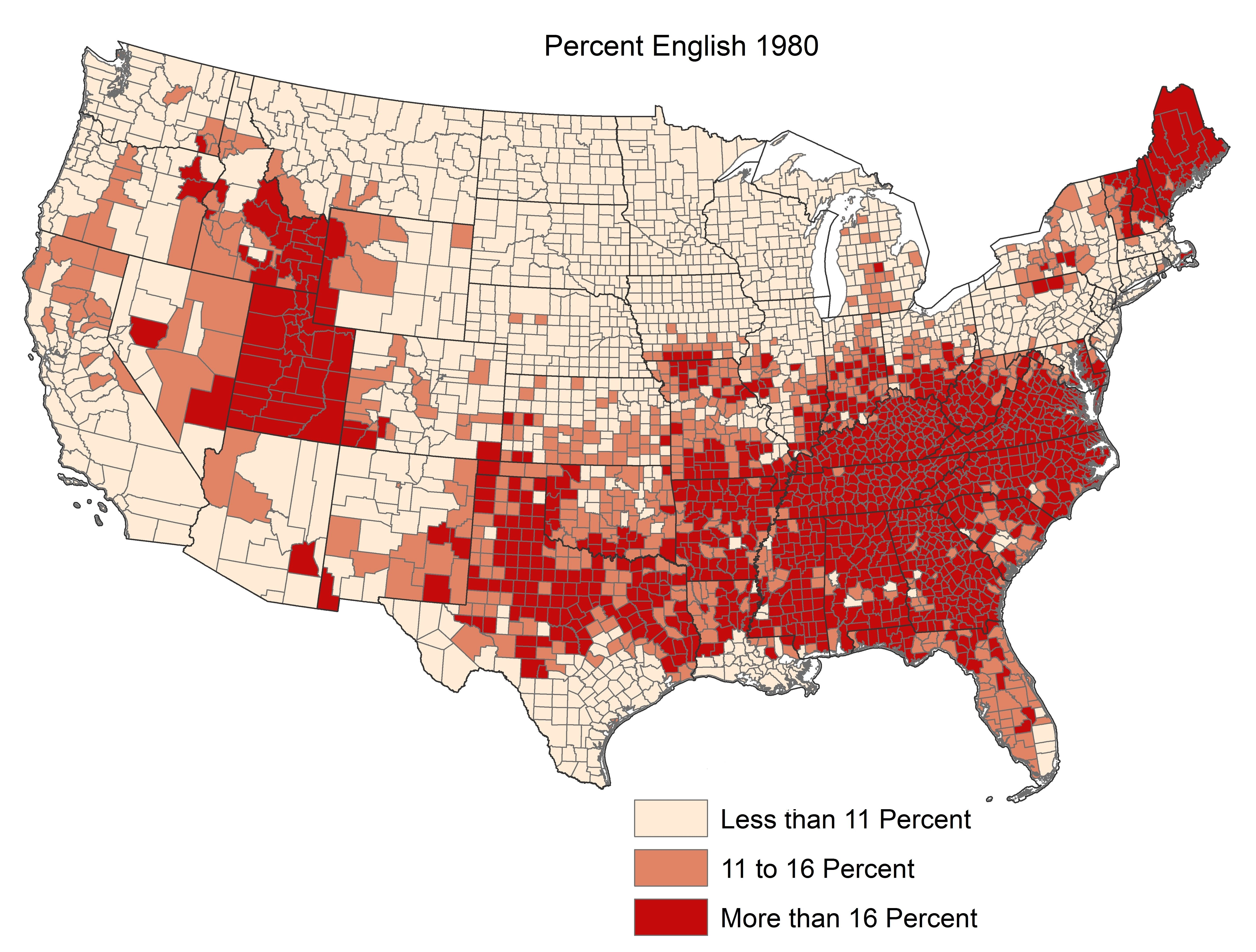
Percentages by county in the 1980 census.

In the 1980 United States census, English ancestry was reported to be at around 49.6 million. This number had dramatically declined by the previously mentioned 2000 census, where 24.5 million people reported English ancestry.

One main reason for this is because once the American ancestry category was introduced for self-reporting ancestry, many people who previously reported having English origins reported as having "American" ancestry instead.

=== 2000 ===
English Americans are found in large numbers throughout the United States, particularly in the Northeast, South and West.

=== Cities ===
The following are the top 20 highest percentages of people of English ancestry, in U.S. communities (total list of the 101 communities, see source):

Top 20 highest cities with over 500 Population: English Ancestry (In Progress)
Rank	City	State	Percent
1	Hildale	Utah	66.9
2	Colorado City	Arizona	52.7
3	Milbridge	Maine	41.1
4	Panguitch	Utah	40
5	Beaver	Utah	39.8
6	Enterprise	Utah	39.4
7	East Machias	Maine	39.1
8	Marriott-Slaterville	Utah	38.2
9	Wellsvile	Utah	37.9
10	Morgan	Utah	37.2
11	Harrington	Maine	36.9
12	Farmington	Utah	36.9
13	Highland	Utah	36.7
14	Nephi	Utah	36.4
15	Fruit Heights	Utah	35.9
16	Addison	Maine	35.6
17	Farr West	Utah	35.4
18	Hooper	Utah	35.0
19	Lewiston	Utah	35.0
20	Plain City	Utah	34.7

Maps showing percentages of Americans who declared English ancestry in the 2000 Census

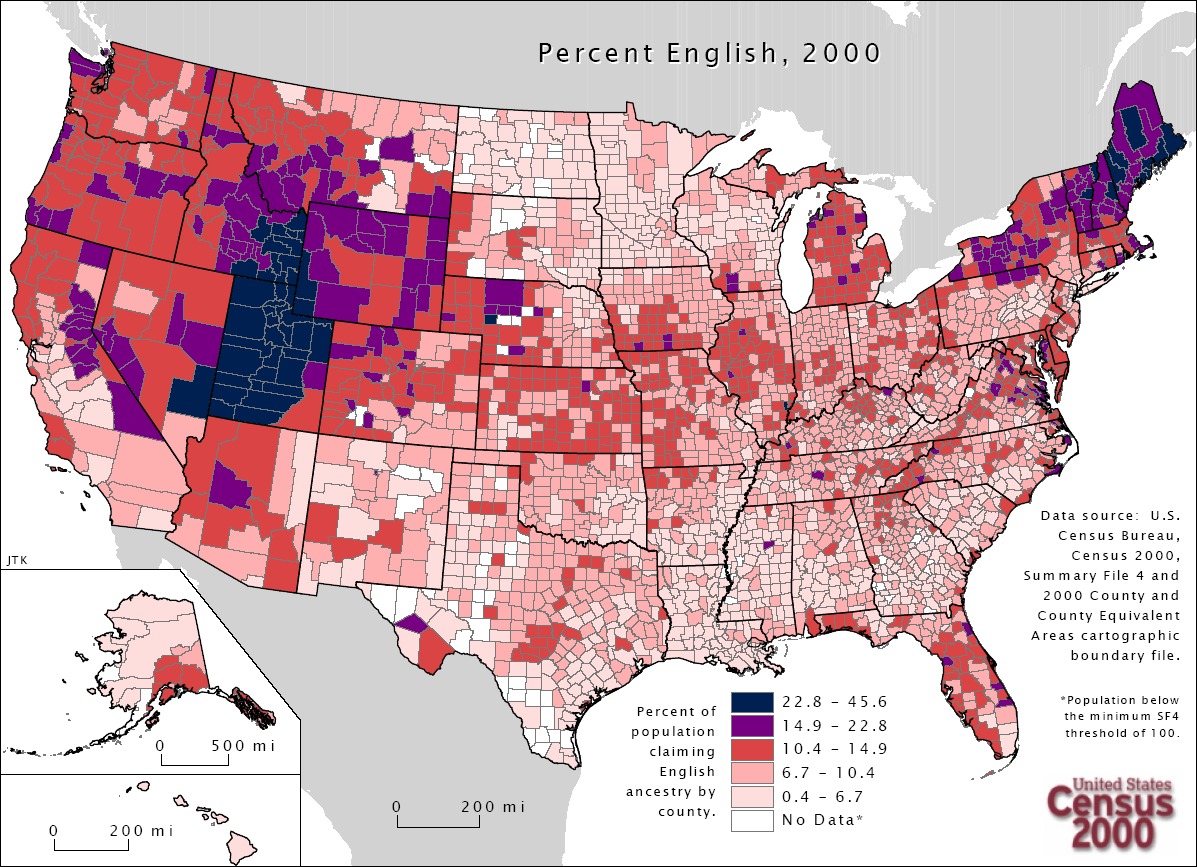
Percentages by county in the 2000 census. Dark blue and purple colours indicate a higher percentage.

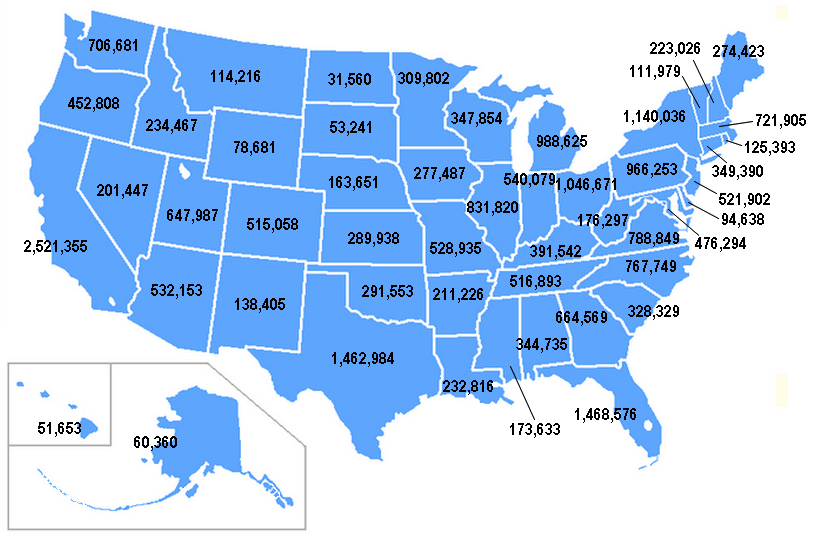
Population by state in the 2000 census

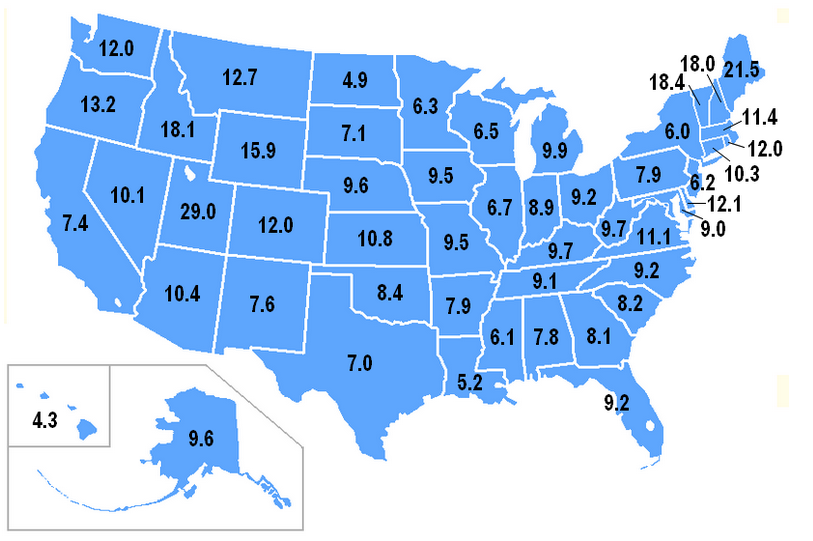
Percentages by U.S. State in the 2000 census

=== 2020 census by state ===
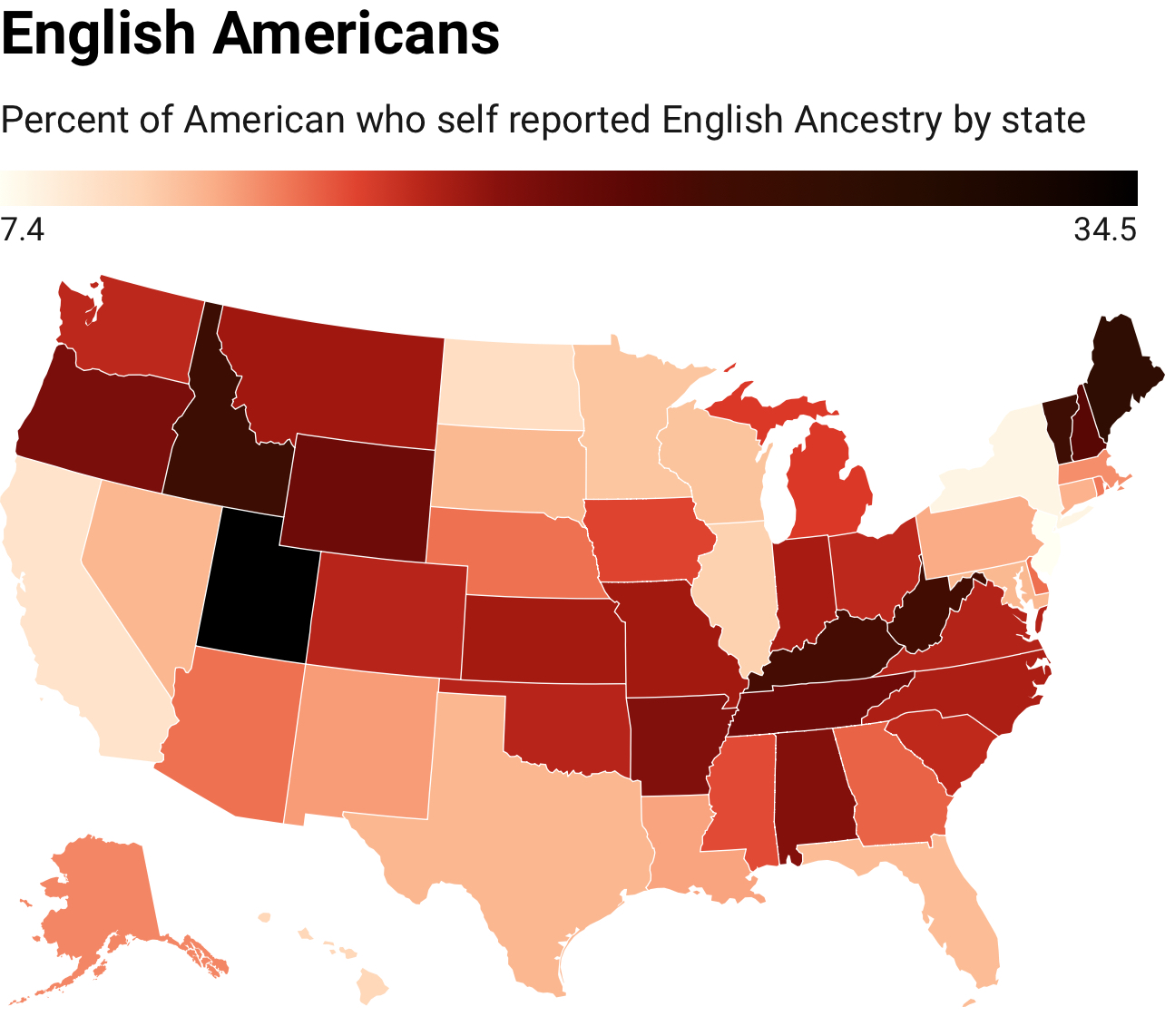
Percent of Americans who self reported English ancestry alone or in any combination, per the 2020 census

Estimated English American population by state.
State	Number	Percentage
Alabama	385,088	7.87%
Alaska	58,856	7.99%
Arizona	608,928	8.49%
Arkansas	247,382	8.21%
California	2,140,130	5.44%
Colorado	592,137	10.42%
Connecticut	299,636	8.39%
Delaware	90,771	9.38%
District of Columbia	39,375	5.61%
Florida	1,477,490	6.96%
Georgia	818,610	7.78%
Hawaii	57,496	4.05%
Idaho	299,782	17.09%
Illinois	725,577	5.71%
Indiana	583,348	8.71%
Iowa	256,125	8.13%
Kansas	298,306	10.24%
Kentucky	491,660	11.02%
Louisiana	254,550	5.46%
Maine	254,612	18.99%
Maryland	439,760	7.28%
Massachusetts	641,698	9.34%
Michigan	882,533	8.85%
Minnesota	315,718	5.64%
Mississippi	218,528	7.33%
Missouri	556,965	9.09%
Montana	123,227	11.61%
Nebraska	154,029	8.01%
Nevada	220,689	7.28%
New Hampshire	229,053	16.90%
New Jersey	429,774	4.84%
New Mexico	138,500	6.60%
New York	988,345	5.06%
North Carolina	1,014,096	9.76%
North Dakota	32,784	4.31%
Ohio	1,006,003	8.62%
Oklahoma	317,835	8.05%
Oregon	478,043	11.45%
Pennsylvania	926,879	7.24%
Rhode Island	111,805	10.57%
South Carolina	460,300	9.04%
South Dakota	54,222	6.17%
Tennessee	637,071	9.41%
Texas	1,772,914	6.19%
Utah	760,362	24.13%
Vermont	105,935	16.97%
Virginia	833,300	9.79%
Washington	772,527	10.28%
West Virginia	200,009	11.07%
Wisconsin	336,875	5.80%
Wyoming	73,981	12.73%
United States	25,213,619	7.72%

== History ==
The English came to North America because of their desire to counter the Spanish and French influence in the New World.

In the sixteenth century, Spain became increasingly affluent and powerful due to its control over the New World. England, apprehensive about its prospects, sought to partake in the New World trade similarly to the Spanish. When Spain declined to share its wealth, English privateers commenced assaults on Spanish vessels and settlements throughout the Americas. In 1586, Sir Francis Drake launched an attack on St. Augustine, Florida, the principal city in Spanish Florida, setting it ablaze. This conflict persisted for nearly two decades. Ultimately, in 1604, both nations ratified a peace treaty. Consequently, England was poised to assert its claim over North America. The English sought to emulate the Spanish by colonizing the Americas and setting up several joint-stock companies to help generate more trade in the region.

=== Early settlement and colonization ===
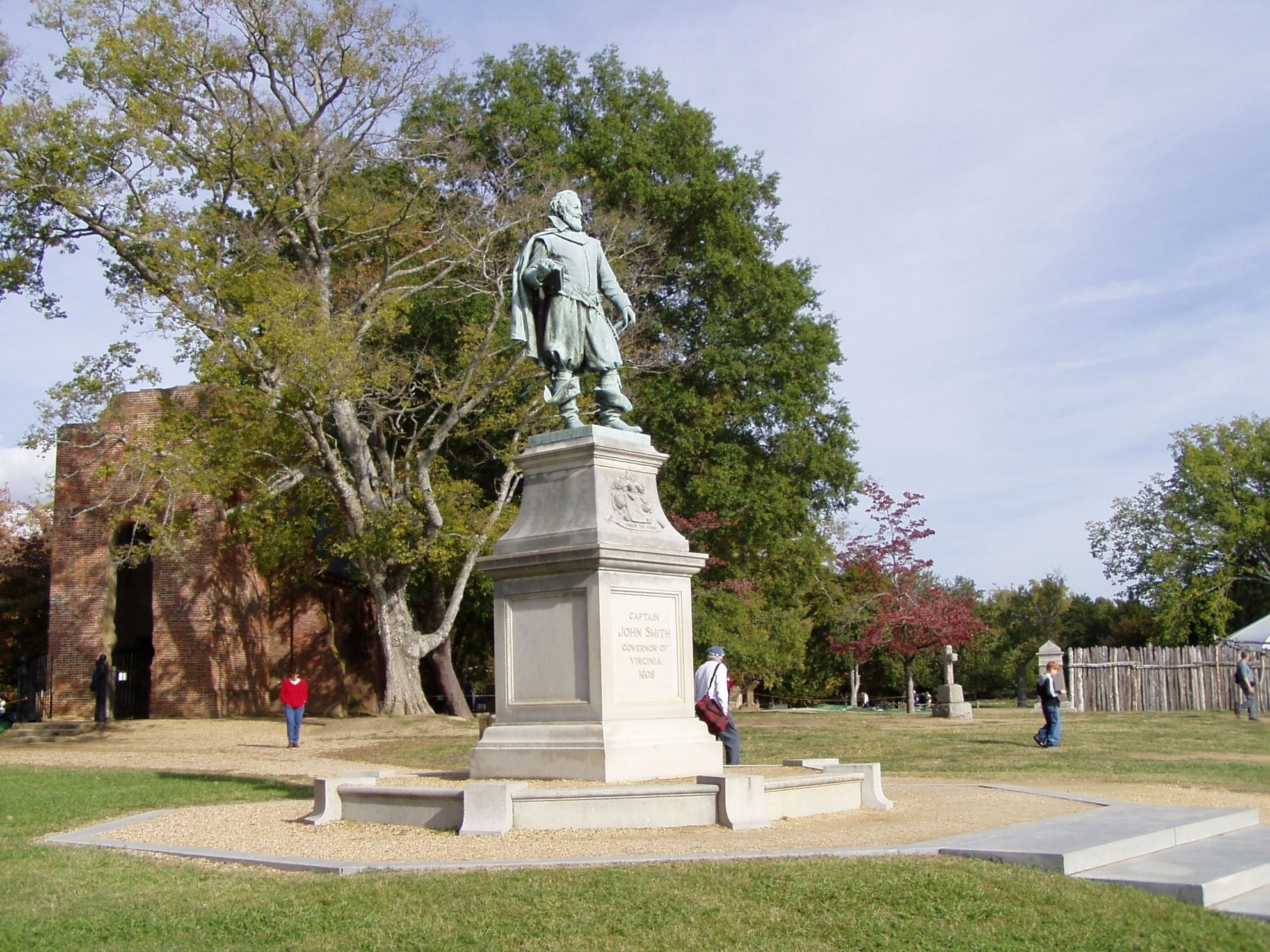
Statue of John Smith for the first English settlement in Historic Jamestowne, Virginia.

English settlement in America began with Jamestown in the Virginia Colony in 1607. With the permission of James I, three ships (the Susan Constant, The Discovery, and The God Speed) sailed from England and landed at Cape Henry in April, under the captainship of Christopher Newport, who had been hired by the London Company to lead expeditions to what is now America.

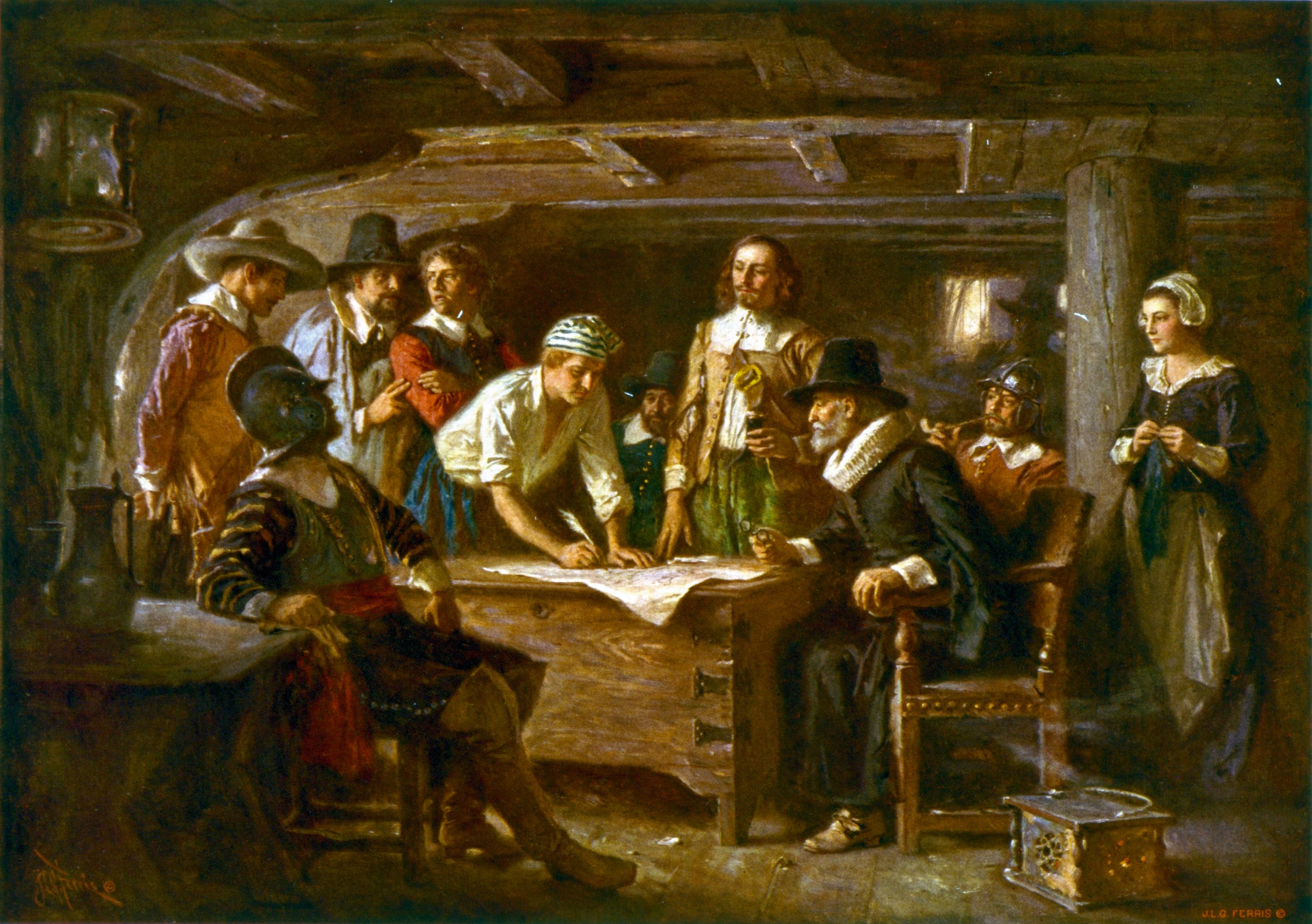
The first self-governing document of Plymouth Colony. English Pilgrims signing the Mayflower Compact in 1620.

The second successful colony was Plymouth Colony, founded in 1620 by people who later became known as the Pilgrims. Fleeing religious persecution in the East Midlands in England, they first went to Holland, but feared losing their English identity. Because of this, they chose to relocate to the New World, with their voyage being financed by English investors. In September 1620, 102 passengers set sail aboard the Mayflower, eventually settling at Plymouth Colony in November. Of the passengers on the Mayflower, 41 men signed the "Mayflower Compact" aboard ship on November 11, 1620, while anchored in Provincetown Harbor. Signers included Carver, Alden, Standish, Howland, Bradford, Allerton, and Fuller. This story has become a central theme in the United States cultural identity.

English colonists gained wealth through the enslavement of Africans and the Atlantic slave trade, which brought Black people from West Africa. Around August 20, 1619, “20 and odd” Angolans from Angola, kidnapped by the Portuguese, arrived in the British colony of Virginia and were bought by English colonists.

The first Native American tribe the English colonists encountered was the Powhatan tribe. When they founded Jamestown in 1607, they arrived in Tsenacomoco, the homeland of the Powhatan Confederacy, an alliance of about 30 Algonquian-speaking tribes led by paramount chief Wahunsenacawh, whom the English called Chief Powhatan.

A number of English colonies were established under a system of proprietary governors, who were appointed under mercantile charters to English joint stock companies to found and run settlements. England also took control over the Dutch colony of New Netherland (including the New Amsterdam settlement), renaming it the Province of New York in 1664. With New Netherland, the English came to control the former New Sweden (in what is now Delaware), which the Dutch had conquered from Sweden earlier. This became part of Pennsylvania. Many planters, slave traders and slave owners who owned black slaves were of English ancestry. Romanichal slaves from England were also enslaved by English colonists in the United States.

A significant number of English Americans are descendants of slave owners who owned Black slaves. The white English population regarded the black race as an inferior race, deemed suitable for enslavement. The English were mainly responsible for slavery in the United States. The practice of slavery in Colonial America, characterized by the enslavement of Africans by white English settlers, commenced in 1640 in the Jamestown Colony of Virginia; however, it had already been adopted as a policy before this time, evidenced by the enslavement, deportation, and genocide of Native Americans. Large plantations in the southern regions, dedicated to the cultivation of tobacco, rice and cotton, became heavily dependent on the labor of African American slaves, whereas smaller farms in the northern areas, usually operated by a farmer and his family, did not necessitate slave labor to the same extent. English colonists possessed numerous slave plantations. English colonists who were white men raped black women and Native American women.

When the London Company sent out its first expedition to begin colonizing Virginia on December 20, 1606, it was by no means the first European attempt to exploit North America. In 1564, for example, French Protestants (Huguenots) built a colony near what is now Jacksonville, Florida. This intrusion did not go unnoticed by the Spanish, who had previously claimed the region. The next year, the Spanish established a military post at St. Augustine; Spanish troops soon wiped out the French interlopers residing but 40 miles away. Meanwhile, Basque, English, and French fishing fleets became regular visitors to the coasts from Newfoundland to Cape Cod. Some of these fishing fleets even set up semi-permanent camps on the coasts to dry their catches and to trade with local people, exchanging furs for manufactured goods. For the next two decades, Europeans' presence in North America was limited to these semi-permanent incursions. Then in the 1580s, the English tried to plant a permanent colony on Roanoke Island (on the outer banks of present-day North Carolina), but their effort was short-lived.

In the early 1600s, in rapid succession, the English began a colony (Jamestown) in Chesapeake Bay in 1607, the French built Quebec in 1608, and the Dutch began their interest in the region that became present-day New York. Within another generation, the Plymouth Company (1620), the Massachusetts Bay Company (1629), the Company of New France (1627), and the Dutch West India Company (1621) began to send thousands of colonists, including families, to North America. Successful colonization was not inevitable. Rather, interest in North America was a halting, yet global, contest among European powers to exploit these lands.

=== English immigration after 1776 ===
Cultural similarities and a common language allowed English immigrants to integrate rapidly and gave rise to a unique Anglo-American culture. An estimated 3.5 million English immigrated to the U.S. after 1776. English settlers provided a steady and substantial influx throughout the 19th century.

English immigration to the United States
Period	Arrivals	Period	Arrivals
1820–1830	15,837	1901–1910	388,017
1831–1840	7,611	1911–1920	249,944
1841–1850	32,092	1921–1930	157,420
1851–1860	247,125	1931–1940	21,756
1861–1870	222,277	1941–1950	112,252
1871–1880	437,706	1951–1960	156,171
1881–1890	644,680	1961–1970	174,452
1891–1900	216,726	1971–1980	–
Total (1820–1970): 3,084,066

A number of English settlers moved to the United States from Australia in the 1850s (then a British political territory), when the California Gold Rush boomed; these included the so-called "Sydney Ducks" (see Australian Americans). In prior eras there were English-centered cultural events such as Morris dance events and Saint George's Day. There had been conflicts between English immigrant groups and Irish immigrant groups. A magazine article from The Republic in 1852 had criticized English immigrants for remaining loyal to the British Crown.

During the last years of the 1860s, annual English immigration grew to over 60,000 and continued to rise to over 75,000 per year in 1872, before experiencing a decline. The final and most sustained wave of immigration began in 1879 and lasted until the depression of 1893. In this period English annual immigration averaged more than 82,000, with peaks in 1882 and 1888 and did not drop significantly until the financial panic of 1893. The building of America's transcontinental railroads, the settlement of the great plains, and industrialization attracted skilled and professional emigrants from England.

English-born in the United States
Year	Population	% of foreign-born
1850	278,675	12.4
1860	431,692	–
1870	550,924	10.0
1880	662,676	–
1890	908,141	9.8
1900	840,513	–
1910	877,719	6.5
1920	813,853	–
1930	809,563	5.7
1940	–	–
1950	–	–
1960	528,205	5.4
1970	458,114	4.8
1980	442,499	–
1990	405,588	–
2000	423,609	–
2010	356,489	0.9

Cheaper steamship fares enabled unskilled urban workers to come to America, and unskilled and semiskilled laborers, miners, and building trades workers made up the majority of these new English immigrants. While most settled in America, a number of skilled craftsmen remained itinerant, returning to England after a season or two of work. Groups came to practice their religion freely.

The depression of 1893 sharply decreased English emigration to the United States, and it stayed low for much of the twentieth century. This decline reversed itself in the decade of World War II when over 100,000 English (18 percent of all European immigrants) came from England. In this group was a large contingent of war brides who came between 1945 and 1948. In these years four women emigrated from England for every man. In the 1950s, English immigration increased to over 150,000 and rose to 170,000 in the 1960s. While differences developed, it is not surprising that English immigrants had little difficulty in assimilating to American life. The American resentment against the policies of the British government was rarely transferred to English settlers who came to America in the first decades of the nineteenth century.

Throughout American history, English immigrants and their descendants have been prominent in every level of government and in every aspect of American life. Known informally as "WASPS" (see White Anglo-Saxon Protestants), their dominance has slipped since 1945, but remains high in many fields. Eight out of the first ten American presidents (and an even higher proportion of out of the 45 (Note: As of 2025. While there have been 47 presidencies, only 45 individuals have served as president. Two presidents have served non-consecutive terms: and thus, conventionally, Grover Cleveland is numbered as both the 22nd and 24th U.S. president, and Donald Trump is numbered as both the 45th and 47th U.S. president.) persons to serve as president), as well as the majority of sitting congressmen and congresswomen, are descended from English ancestors. The descendants of English expatriates are so numerous and so well integrated in American life that it is impossible to identify all of them. While they are the third-largest ethnic nationality self-reported in the 1990 census, they retain such a pervasive representation at every level of national and state government that, on any list of American senators, Supreme Court judges, governors, or legislators, they would constitute a plurality if not an outright majority.

In 2011, Lucy Tobin of The Guardian wrote that, as of that year, it was not common to see English cultural heritage expression nor events in the United States.

=== Political influence ===
As early colonists of the United States, settlers from England and their descendants often held positions of power and made and enforced laws, often because many had been involved in government back in England. In the original Thirteen Colonies, most laws contained elements found in the English common law system. The majority of the Founding Fathers of the United States were of English extraction. A minority were of high social status and can be classified as White Anglo-Saxon Protestant (WASP). Many of the prewar WASP elite were Loyalists who left the new nation.

While WASPs have been major players in every major American political party, an exceptionally strong association has existed between WASPs and the liberal fraction of the Republican Party, before the 1980s. A few top Democrats qualified, such as Franklin D. Roosevelt. Northeastern Republican leaders such as Leverett Saltonstall of Massachusetts, Prescott Bush of Connecticut and especially Nelson Rockefeller of New York exemplified the pro-business liberal Republicanism of their social stratum, espousing internationalist views on foreign policy, supporting social programs, advancing environmental issues, and holding liberal views on issues like racial integration.

A famous confrontation was the 1952 Senate election in Massachusetts where John F. Kennedy, a Catholic of Irish descent, defeated WASP Henry Cabot Lodge Jr. However the challenge by Barry Goldwater in 1964 to the Eastern Republican establishment helped undermine the WASP dominance. Goldwater himself had solid WASP credentials through his mother, of a prominent old Yankee family, but was instead mistakenly seen as part of the Jewish community (which he had never associated with). By the 1980s, the liberal Rockefeller Republican wing of the party was marginalized, overwhelmed by the dominance of the Southern and Western conservative Republicans.

Asking "Is the WASP leader a dying breed?" journalist Nina Strochlic in 2012 pointed to eleven WASP top politicians—typically scions of upper class English families. She ended with Republicans George H. W. Bush elected in 1988, his son George W. Bush elected in 2000 and 2004, and John McCain, who was nominated but defeated in 2008.

=== Relations with Native Americans ===
When English colonists initiated the establishment of colonies on the North American continent, they aspired to coexist harmoniously with their Native American neighbors. The English believed that their indigenous counterparts would acknowledge the superiority of English civilization and would seek to imitate the English colonists. Regrettably for the English settlers, the Native Americans were not inclined to fulfill these expectations. Equally troubling for the colonists was the fact that several of their own found Indian culture more appealing than English society. This situation alarmed colonial leaders, prompting all colonies to take measures to prevent their citizens from adopting Native American lifestyles. The English colonists exhibited an unquenchable desire for Native American lands.

To rationalize their appropriation of Indian territory, English officials and colonists relied on three specific justifications. Firstly, they asserted their claim to the land by virtue of discovery. Secondly, they claimed the land through conquest. Lastly, they contended that they had a superior right to the land because they could utilize it more effectively than the Native Americans. Land was arguably the most significant source of tension in Anglo-Indian relations during the colonial era.

English colonists and later American settlers often resorted to violence against Native Americans, motivated by the desire for land, cultural misunderstandings, and fear. Significant confrontations arose during this period, such as the Anglo-Powhatan Wars from 1610 to 1646, the Pequot War between 1636 and 1638, and King Philip’s War from 1675 to 1678. These conflicts were marked by brutal massacres, the enslavement of Indigenous people, and the widespread destruction of their villages.

== Language ==
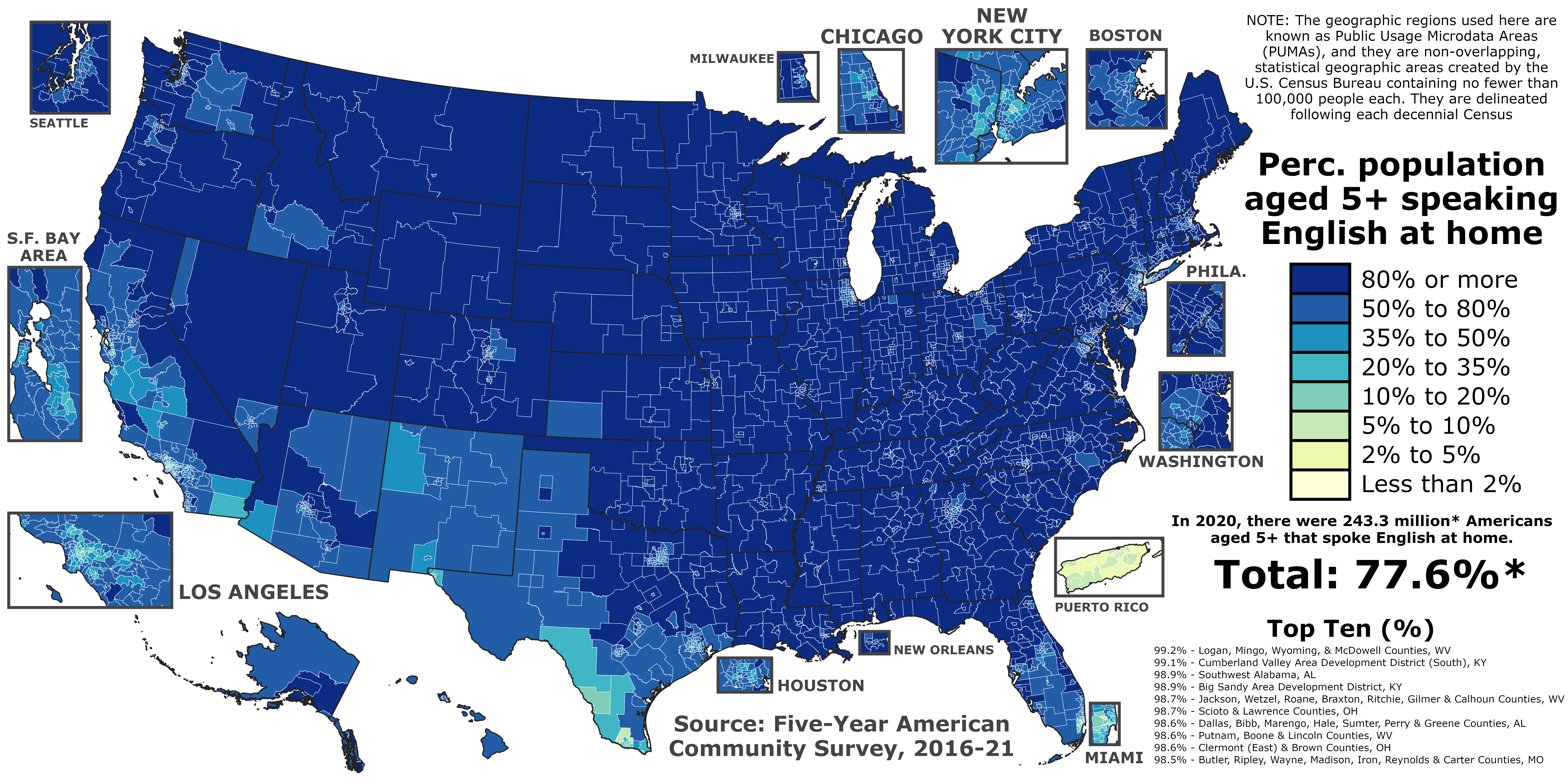
Percentage of Americans aged 5+ speaking English at home in each Public Usage Microdata Area (PUMA) of the fifty states, the District of Columbia, and Puerto Rico.

English is the most commonly spoken language in the U.S., where it is estimated that two thirds of all native speakers of English live. The American English dialect developed from English colonization. It serves as the de facto official language, the language in which government business is carried out. According to the 1990 census, 94% of the U.S. population speak only English.

Adding those who speak English "well" or "very well" brings this figure to 96%. Only 0.8% speak no English at all as compared with 3.6% in 1890. American English differs from British English in a number of ways, the most striking being in terms of pronunciation (for example, standard American English is rhotic (with many regional exceptions: e.g., New York English, Boston English, New England English, and many Southern and AAVE dialects), whereas standard British English is nonrhotic (with many exceptions: e.g., West Country English, Blackburn English) and spelling (one example is the "u" in words such as color, favor (US) vs colour, favour (UK)). Less obvious differences are present in grammar and vocabulary. The differences are rarely a barrier to effective communication between American English and British English speakers, but there are certainly enough differences to cause occasional misunderstandings, usually surrounding slang or dialect differences.

Conversely, some lexical items often thought to be Americanisms actually have their origin in England, either falling out of use there or being restricted to specific dialects in England. Such items include all out ("entirely"), cattail ("bullrush"), crib ("child's bed"), daddy long legs ("cranefly"), homecoming ("return"), rumpus ("tumult"), which are recorded in Northern and Midland English dialects as late as the 19th century.

Some states, like California, have amended their constitutions to make English the only official language, but in practice, this only means that official government documents must at least be in English, and does not mean that they should be exclusively available only in English. For example, the standard California Class C driver's license examination is available in 32 different languages.

=== Expression ===
"In for a penny, in for a pound" is an expression to mean, ("if you're going to take a risk at all, you might as well make it a big risk"), is used in the United States which dates back to the colonial period, when cash in the colonies was denominated in Pounds, shillings and Pence.

== Cultural contributions ==
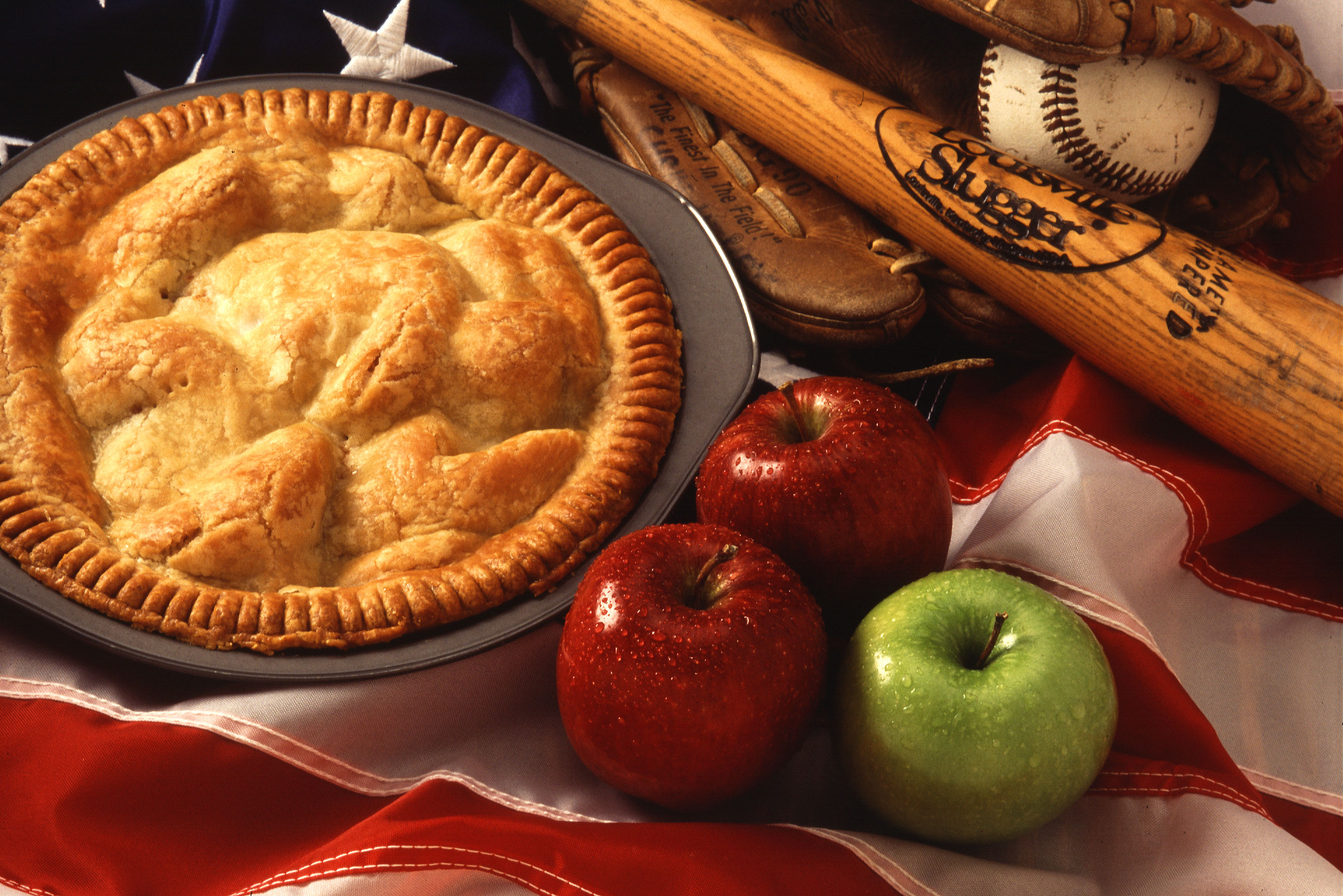
American cultural icons, apple pie, baseball, and the American flag.

Much of American culture shows influences from English culture.

=== Cuisine ===
Some English foods appear similar to American dishes but are prepared or used differently. For example, baked beans on toast are commonly eaten for breakfast or as a quick comfort meal in England. Broiled tomatoes are also a typical breakfast item. "Mushy peas" are dried marrowfat peas cooked into a soft mush, often served like mashed potatoes. What Americans call "potato chips" are known as "crisps" in England, while English "chips" refer to what Americans call "French fries." In England, cider usually means alcoholic "hard cider," unlike in the United States where it often refers to pressed apple juice. Additionally, tea in England can mean both a drink and a type of meal. "High tea" is a more formal dinner with a wide variety of dishes, whereas "low tea" is an afternoon snack featuring cakes, scones, biscuits, small sandwiches, fruit, and cheese served with tea and other beverages. English scones are more like sweet baking-powder biscuits rather than the cake-like cookies common in the U.S., and "biscuits" in England are what Americans call cookies.

Some dishes and foods considered to have English origins in the United States include roast beef with Yorkshire pudding, Beef Wellington, dessert trifles, bangers and mash, shepherd’s pie, scones, porridge (oatmeal), English muffins, custard, Christmas pudding, fish and chips, and the Thanksgiving dinner. Other distinctly English products available include digestive biscuits, teacakes, fruit loafs, mustards, gravy, jams, honey, cheeses, Branston Pickle, English-style bacon and sausages, pasties, many meat pies, and Walkers crisps. Weetabix breakfast cereal, Marmite, marmalade, Nutella, clotted cream, treacle and Cadbury's chocolate are also popular.

- Apple pie – New England was the first region to experience large-scale English colonization in the early 17th century, beginning in 1620, and it was dominated by East Anglian Calvinists, better known as the Puritans. Baking was a particular favorite of the New Englanders and was the origin of dishes seen today as quintessentially "American", such as apple pie and the oven-roasted Thanksgiving turkey. "As American as apple pie" is a well-known phrase used to suggest that something is all-American.
- Roast beef – In the middle of the 17th century a second wave of English immigrants began arriving in North America, settling mainly in the Chesapeake Bay region of Virginia and Maryland, expanding upon the Jamestown settlement. Their roast beef was often served with Yorkshire puddings and horseradish sauce.
- Shortcake – Shortcake came from England and was adapted to strawberry shortcake, which rapidly became a classic in American cuisine. Early English settlers discovered strawberries that they viewed as a symbol of America's plentiful resources and even the dish continues to be a seasonal favorite in American culinary traditions.

=== Celebrations ===
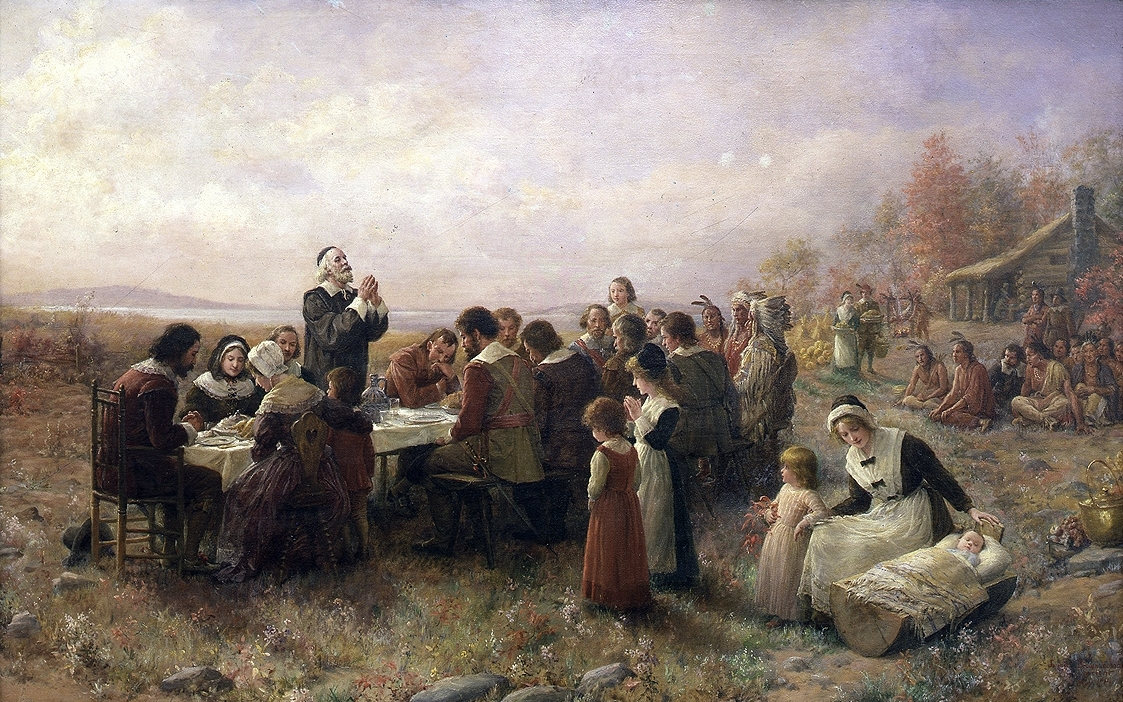
The First Thanksgiving at Plymouth Colony by English Pilgrims in October 1621.

- Thanksgiving was celebrated by English settlers to give thanks to God for helping the Pilgrims of Plymouth Colony survive the brutal winter. This feast lasted three days, as accounted by attendee Edward Winslow.

=== Law ===
The American legal system also has its roots in English law. English law prior to the American Revolution is still part of the law of the United States, and provides the basis for many American legal traditions and policies. After the revolution, English law was again adopted by the now independent American States. The American tradition of judicial precedence is also rooted in English common law.

=== Education ===
The first American schools opened in the 17th century in New England. Boston Latin School was founded in 1635 and is both the first public school and oldest existing school in the United States. The first free taxpayer-supported public school in North America, the Mather School, was opened in Dorchester, Massachusetts, in 1639.

New England had a long emphasis on literacy in order that individuals could read the Bible. Harvard College was founded by the colonial legislature in 1636, and named after an early benefactor. Most of the funding came from the colony, but the college began to build an endowment from its early years. Harvard at first focused on training young men for the ministry, but many alumni went into law, medicine, government or business. The college was a leader in bringing Newtonian science to the colonies.

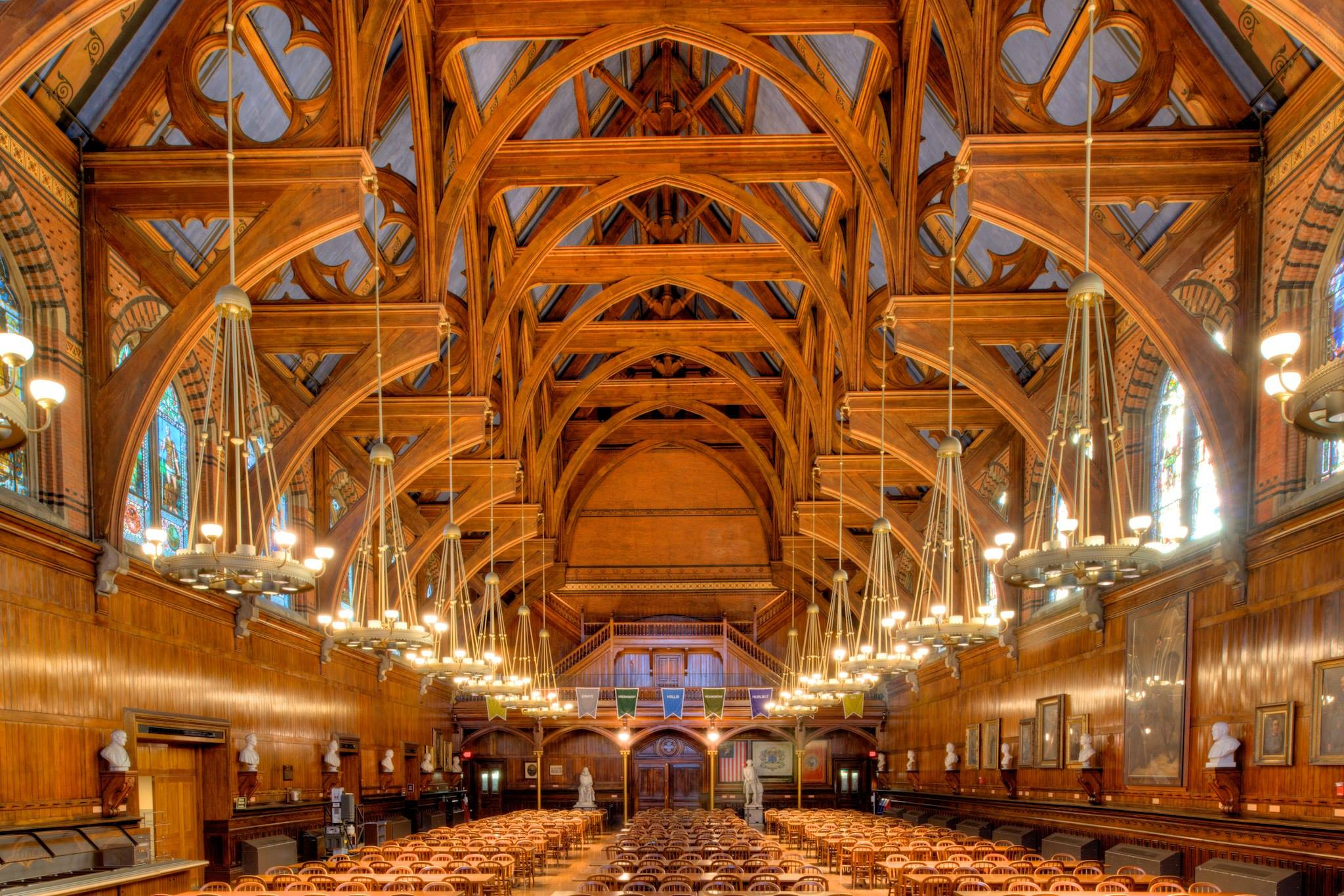
Harvard University is the oldest institution of higher learning in the United States.

A school of higher education for both Native American young men and the sons of the colonists was one of the earliest goals of the leaders of the Colony of Virginia. The College of William & Mary was founded on February 8, 1693, under a royal charter (legally, letters patent) to "make, found and establish a certain Place of Universal Study, a perpetual College of Divinity, Philosophy, Languages, and other good arts and sciences...to be supported and maintained, in all time coming." Named in honor of the reigning monarchs King William III and Queen Mary II, the college is the second oldest college in the United States. It hired the first law professor and trained many of the lawyers, politicians, and leading planters. Students headed for the ministry were given free tuition.

Yale College was founded by Puritans in 1701, and in 1716 was relocated to New Haven, Connecticut. The conservative Puritan ministers of Connecticut had grown dissatisfied with the more liberal theology of Harvard, and wanted their own school to train orthodox ministers. However president Thomas Clap (1740–1766) strengthened the curriculum in the natural sciences and made Yale a stronghold of revivalist New Light theology.

The Colonial Colleges are nine institutions of higher education that were chartered in the Thirteen Colonies before the United States of America became a sovereign nation after the American Revolutionary War. These nine have long been considered together, notably since the survey of their origins in the 1907 The Cambridge History of English and American Literature. Seven of the nine colonial colleges became seven of the eight Ivy League universities: Harvard, Columbia, Princeton, Yale, University of Pennsylvania, Dartmouth, and Brown.

=== Music ===
- National anthem – The Star-Spangled Banner takes its melody from the 18th-century English song "The Anacreontic Song" written by John Stafford Smith for the Anacreontic Society, a men's social club in London. The lyrics were written by Francis Scott Key of English descent. This became a well-known and recognized patriotic song throughout the United States, which was officially designated as the U.S. national anthem in 1931.
- Hail to the Chief – is the song to announce the arrival or presence of the President of the United States. English songwriter James Sanderson (c. 1769 – c. 1841), composed the music and was first performed in 1812 in New York.

Before 1931, other songs served as the hymns of American officialdom.

- The Liberty Song – written by John Dickinson of English descent in 1768 to the music of Englishman William Boyce's "Heart of Oak", is perhaps the first patriotic song written in America. The song contains the line "by uniting we stand, by dividing we fall", the first recorded use of the sentiment.
- America (My Country, 'Tis of Thee) – whose melody was indirectly derived from the British national anthem, also served as a de facto anthem before the adoption of "The Star-Spangled Banner."
- Amazing Grace – written by English poet and clergyman John Newton became such an icon in American culture that it has been used for a variety of secular purposes and marketing campaigns, placing it in danger of becoming a cliché.
- Yankee Doodle – is written and accredited to Englishman Richard Shuckburgh an army doctor. The tune comes from the English nursery rhyme Lucy Locket.

English ballads, jigs, and hornpipes had a large influence on American folk music, eventually contributing to the formation of such genres as old time, country, bluegrass, and to a lesser extent, blues as well.

=== Sports ===
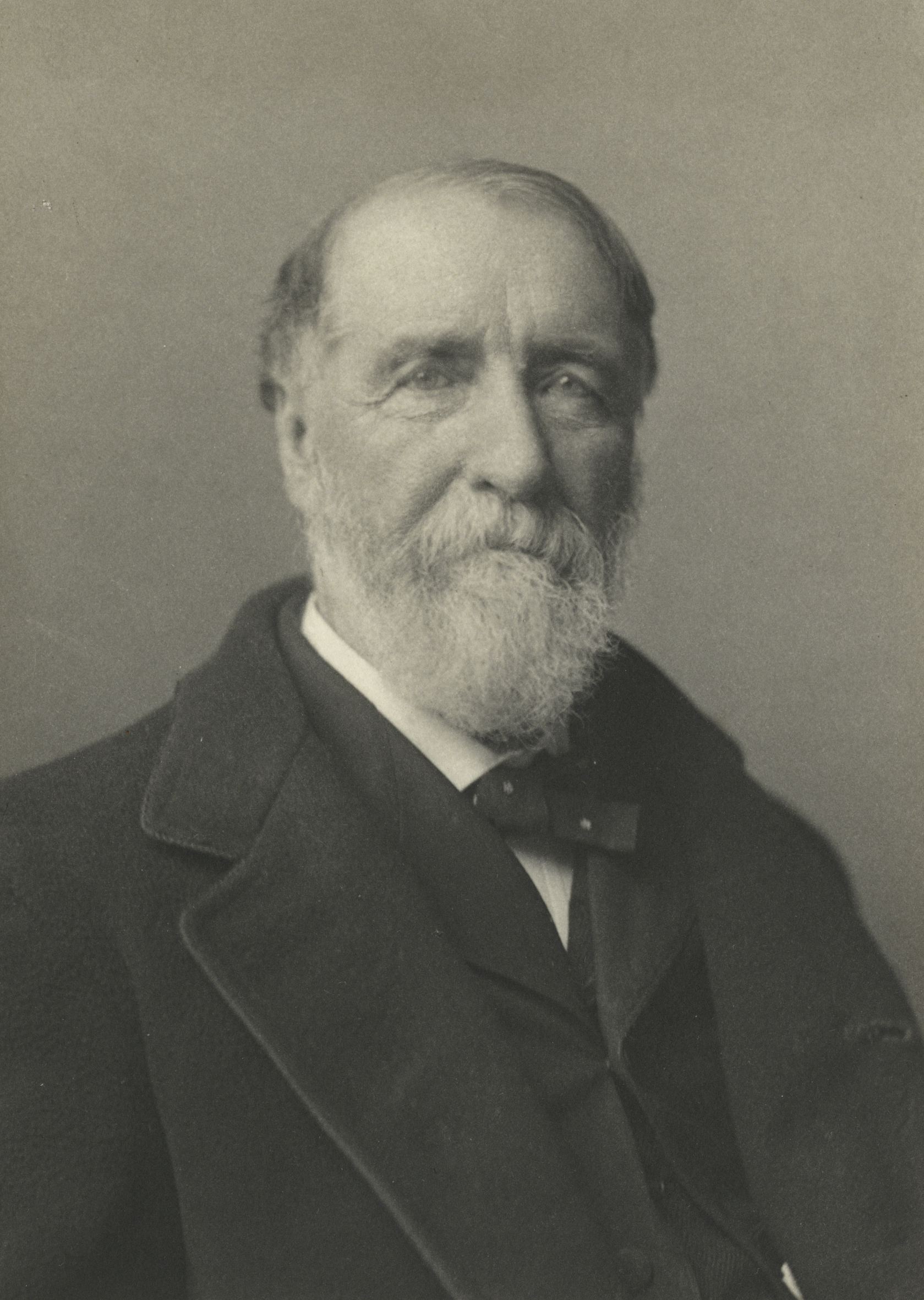
Henry Chadwick is often called the "Father of Baseball" because of his early contributions to the game's development.

- Baseball was invented in England. English lawyer William Bray recorded a game of baseball on Easter Monday 1755 in Guildford, Surrey; Bray's diary was verified as authentic in September 2008. This early form of the game was apparently brought to North America by British immigrants. The first appearance of the term that exists in print was in "A Little Pretty Pocket-Book" in 1744, where it is called Base-Ball.
- American football traces its roots to early versions of rugby football, played in England and first developed in American universities in the mid-19th century.

=== Religion ===
The predominant faith among English colonists was Protestant Christianity, with variations in specific denominations depending on the region. The New England colonies were primarily inhabited by Puritans and Congregationalists, who aimed to reform the Church of England. In the Middle Colonies, a variety of Protestant groups, including Quakers and Mennonites, coexisted with Anglicans, whereas the Southern Colonies were mainly Anglican, mirroring the established Church of England.

== Most common family last names ==
In 2010, the top ten family names in the United States, seven have English origins or having possible mixed British Isles heritage, the other three being of Spanish and/or Basque origin. Many African Americans have their origins in slavery (i.e. slave name) and ancestrally came to bear the surnames of their former owners. Many freed slaves either created family names themselves or adopted the name of their former master. Due to anti-German xenophobia during the first and second world wars, some German families anglicized their names. For example, changing "Schmidt" to "Smith," causing an increase of English names.

Name	Number	Country of Origin	England (2001)
Smith	2,442,977	England, Scotland, Ireland	Smith
Johnson	1,932,812	England, Scotland (Can also be an anglicization of the Dutch Jansen or Scandinavian Johansen, Johansson, Jonsson, etc.)	
Williams	1,625,252	England, Wales	Taylor
Brown	1,437,026	England, Ireland, Scotland	Brown
Jones	1,425,470	England, Wales	Williams
García	1,166,120	Spain, especially the Basque Country	Wilson
Miller	1,161,437	England, Ireland, or Scotland (Miller can be the anglicized version of Mueller/Müller – a surname from Germany)	Johnson
Davis	1,116,357	England, Wales	Davies
Rodríguez	1,094,924	Spain	Robinson, Roderick
Martinez	1,060,159	Spain	Wright

== Locations with an English-origin name ==
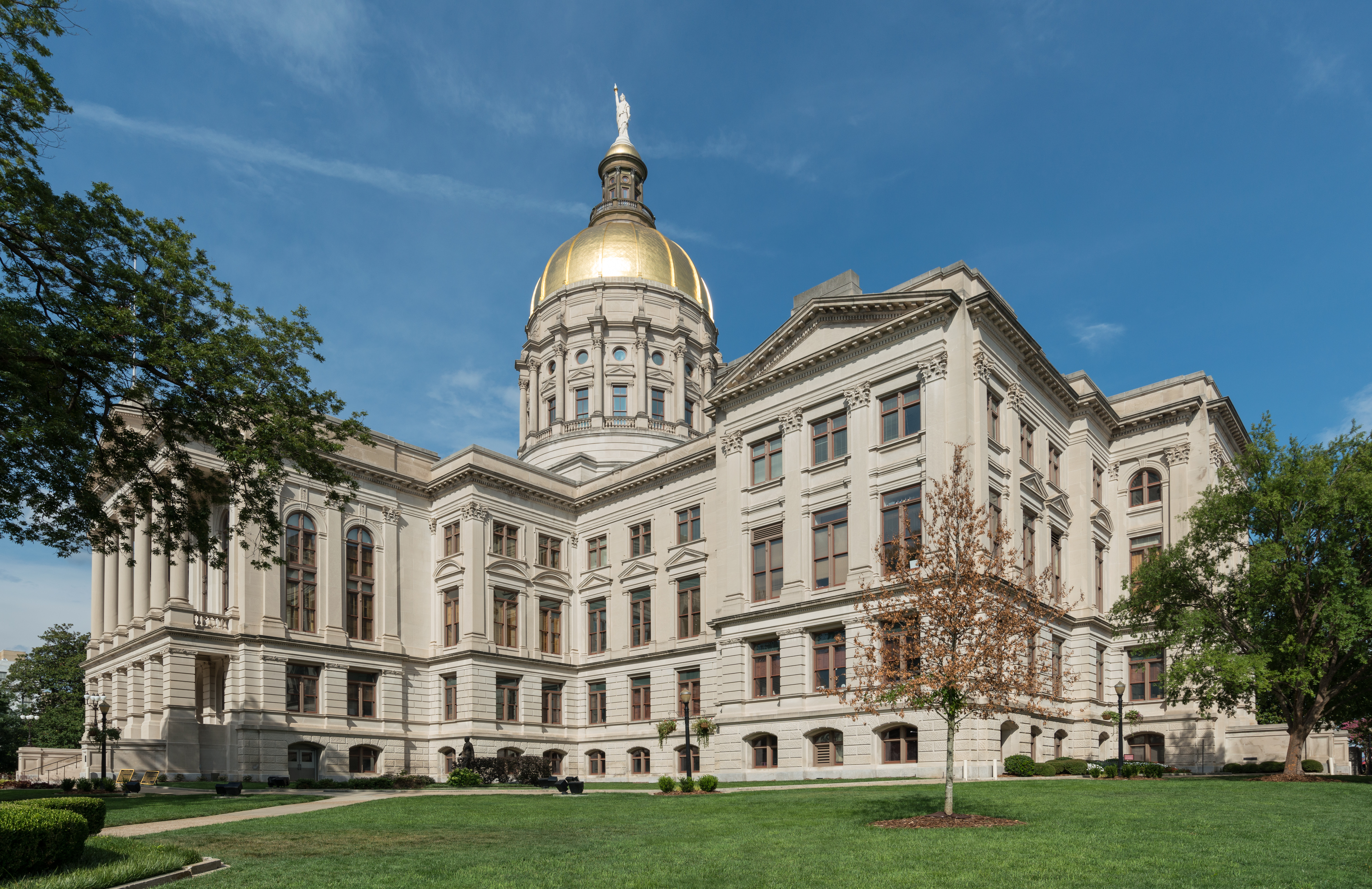
Georgia was named after George II of Great Britain, who signed the charter creating the colony of Georgia on April 21, 1732.

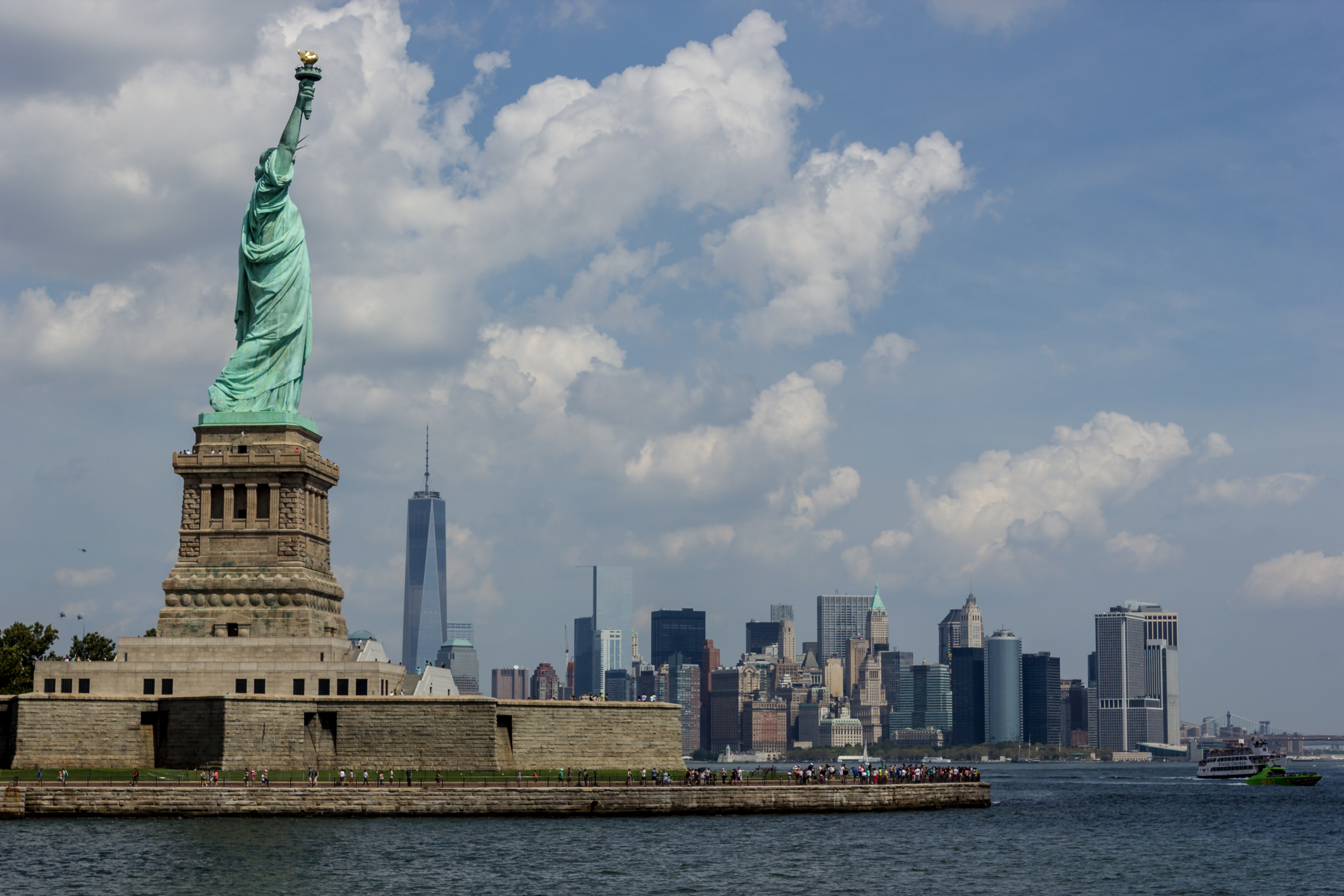
In 1664, the English renamed "New York" after the Duke of York.

This is a brief partial list of places in the United States named after places in England as a result of the many English settlers and explorers; in addition, some places were named after the English royal family. These include the region of New England and some of the following:

=== Alabama ===
- Birmingham for Birmingham, West Midlands
- Bradford, Alabama, for Bradford, West Yorkshire
- Brighton for Brighton, West Sussex
- Langdale, named for the Lang textile manufacturing family from Oldham, Greater Manchester
- Leeds, for Leeds, West Yorkshire
- Sheffield, Alabama for Sheffield, South Yorkshire
- Woodstock, for Woodstock, Oxfordshire
- York, for York, North Yorkshire

=== California ===
- Jesmond Dene, named after Jesmond Dene in Newcastle upon Tyne.
- Keswick, for Keswick, Cumberland
- Westminster after Westminster in London
- Exeter after Exeter, Devon
- Windsor after Windsor, Berkshire

=== Connecticut ===
- Avon after Avon, England
- Colchester after Colchester, England
- Cornwall after Cornwall, England
- Danbury after Danbury, Essex, England
- Enfield after Enfield, London, England
- Greenwich after Greenwich, England
- Guilford after Guildford, England
- Kent after Kent, England
- Litchfield after Lichfield, England
- New London after London, England
- Norwich after Norwich, England
- Stamford after Stamford, Lincolnshire, England
- Stratford named after Stratford-upon-Avon, Warwickshire, owing to the English town's prestige as the birthplace of playwright William Shakespeare (1564–1616).
- Windsor after Windsor, Berkshire, in England

=== Delaware ===
- Dover after Dover, England
- New Castle, probably for William Cavendish, 1st Duke of Newcastle upon Tyne
- Wilmington named by Proprietor Thomas Penn after his friend Spencer Compton, Earl of Wilmington, who was prime minister in the reign of George II of Great Britain.

=== Florida ===
- Windermere, named for Windermere, Westmorland, the largest lake of the Lake District and England.

=== Georgia ===
- Georgia was named after King George II.
- Acton, for Acton, London.
- Camden County, for English jurist Sir Charles Pratt, Earl of Camden (1714–1794).
- Chatsworth, for Chatsworth, Derbyshire
- Cumberland Island, named for Prince William, Duke of Cumberland (1721–1765).
- Dungeness, on Cumberland Island, named for Dungeness in Kent, where the Duke of Cumberland held a county seat.
- Effingham County, for Thomas Howard, 3rd Earl of Effingham (1746–1791) an English nobleman.
- Epworth, for Epworth, Lincolnshire.
- Eton, for Eton College, Berkshire
- Fairburn, for Fairburn, West Riding of Yorkshire.
- Glynn County, for Cornwall-born lawyer John Glynn (1722-1779).
- Liverpool, for Liverpool, Lancashire.
- Malvern, for Malvern, Worcestershire.
- Hardwick, for Philip Yorke, 1st Earl of Hardwicke (1690–1764), Lord High Chancellor of England.
- Harris County, named for the English lawyer Charles Harris (1772–1827).
- Manchester, Georgia, for Manchester, Lancashire
- Midway River, possibly for River Medway, Kent.
- Oglethorpe, after James Oglethorpe (1696–1785), an English Member of Parliament.
- Oxford, for Oxford University, Oxfordshire.
- Saint George's Parish (now Burke County), for Saint George, the Patron Saint of England.
- Tweed, after the River Tweed in southeastern Scotland and Northumberland in northern England.
- Wilmington Island, for Spencer Compton, Earl of Wilmington (1673–1743).
- Winchester, for Winchester, Hampshire.
- Windsor, for Windsor, Berkshire.
- Wooster, for George Wooster, the Englishman who established the first post office here in the 1870s.
- York, Georgia, named for York, the county town of Yorkshire in northern England.

=== Illinois ===
- Albion, named for Albion, a poetic name for England derived from an ancient name for Britain.
- Brereton, possibly for Brereton, Staffordshire.
- Burton, for Burton upon Trent, Staffordshire.
- Chesterfield, probably for Chesterfield, Derbyshire.
- Lincolnshire, named for Lincolnshire, a county in England.
- Stratford, probably for Stratford-upon-Avon, in honour of the English town being the birthplace of William Shakespeare (1564–1616).

=== Indiana ===
- Avon, named for Avon, an English river name.
- Darlington, named for Darlington, County Durham, for its links to Quakerism.

=== Kentucky ===
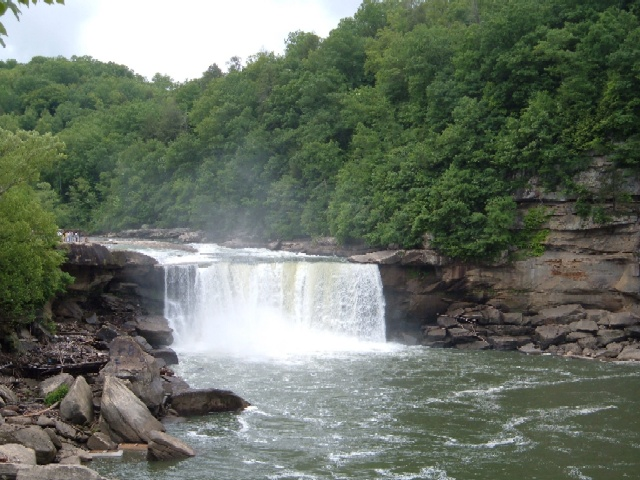
The English county name "Cumberland" is commonly replicated in Appalachia, such as at Cumberland River (pictured). The Duke of Cumberland appealed to northern English settlers for his victory at Culloden (1746)

- Cumberland River in Kentucky and northern Tennessee (with Cumberland Gap, Mountains and Plateau), named in the 1750s for the northern English county of Cumberland, if not the Duke of Cumberland.
- Epworth, for Epworth, Lincolnshire.
- London, for London
- Manchester, Kentucky, for Manchester, Lancashire.
- Kingston, possibly for Kingston upon Hull, East Riding of Yorkshire.
- Middlesboro, founded as "Middlesborough", for the town now known as Middlesbrough, North Riding of Yorkshire.
- Newstead, for Newstead Abbey, Nottinghamshire.
- Stanford, for Stamford, Lincolnshire.
- Richardsville, named for English-born wagonmaker Thomas Richards (1812–1896).
- Wendover, for Wendover, Buckinghamshire
- Williba, for Willoughby, Lincolnshire

=== Maine ===
- Maine itself has an uncertain namesake, but possibly for Maine, Dorset (now Broadmayne).
- Berwick, named for Berwick-upon-Tweed, Northumberland.
- Cambridge, for Cambridge, Cambridgeshire.
- Durham, for Durham, County Durham.
- Hampden, for English politician John Hampden (1595-1643).
- Kittery, for Kittery Court, Kingswear, Devon.
- Leeds, for Leeds, West Riding of Yorkshire.
- Newcastle, for Thomas Pelham-Holles, 1st Duke of Newcastle (1693–1768).
- Scarborough, for Scarborough, North Riding of Yorkshire.
- Sedgwick, for Robert Sedgwick (1611-1656) a Bedfordshire-born colonist.
- Standish, for Lancashire-born Pilgrim Myles Standish (1584-1656).
- Wells, for Wells, Somerset.
- Windham, for Wymondham, Norfolk.
- Winthrop, for Suffolk-born John Winthrop (1588–1649), the 2nd colonial Governor of the Massachusetts Bay Colony.

=== Maryland ===
- Maryland named so for Queen Henrietta Maria (Queen Mary).
- Anne Arundel County, named for Lady Ann Arundell (1615–1649), the daughter of Wiltshire noble Thomas Arundell, 1st Baron Arundell of Wardour.
- Barton, named for Barton-upon-Humber, Lincolnshire, the hometown of the father of an early settler.
- Brinklow, for Brinklow, Warwickshire
- Chevy Chase, named for "The Battle of Chevy Chase", a 15th-century English ballad about a hunt led by the Earl of Northumberland.
- Cumberland, for Prince William, Duke of Cumberland (1721–1765).
- Darlington, for Darlington, County Durham
- Manchester, for Manchester, Lancashire.
- Olney, for Olney, Buckinghamshire.
- Oxon Hill, for Oxford, Oxfordshire (abbreviated Oxon.).
- Pomfret, named for Pontefract, West Riding of Yorkshire.
- Whitehaven, for Whitehaven, Cumberland.
- Worcester County, named for the family of the Marquess of Worcester.

=== Massachusetts ===
- Andover, for Andover, Hampshire
- Attleboro, for Attleborough, Norfolk.
- Beverly, after Beverley, East Riding of Yorkshire.
- Billerica, for Billericay, Essex
- Boston after Boston, Lincolnshire
- Boxford, for Boxford, Suffolk
- Braintree after Braintree, Essex
- Cambridge, for Cambridge, Cambridgeshire.
- Chelmsford, for Chelmsford, Essex
- Framingham, for Framlingham, Suffolk
- Gloucester after Gloucester, Gloucestershire
- Groton, for Groton, Suffolk
- Hadley, for Hadleigh, Suffolk.
- Haverhill, for Haverhill, Suffolk
- Hingham, for Hingham, Norfolk
- Holland, for Henry Fox, 1st Baron Holland (1705–1774)
- Ipswich, for Ipswich, Suffolk
- Kragsyde, for Cragside, Northumberland
- Lancaster, for Lancaster, Lancashire, the hometown of an early settler.
- Leominster after Leominster, Herefordshire
- Lynn, for King's Lynn, Norfolk
- Malden, for Maldon, Essex
- Manchester-by-the-Sea, for Manchester, Lancashire
- Marlborough after Marlborough, Wiltshire
- Northampton after Northampton, Northamptonshire
- Newton, for Newton, Norfolk
- Plymouth, for Plymouth, Devon, the port from which the first Pilgrim settlers departed in 1620
- Rowley, for Rowley, East Riding of Yorkshire
- Shrewsbury, named after George Talbot, 6th Earl of Shrewsbury
- Southampton after Southampton, Hampshire
- Springfield after Springfield, Essex
- Sunderland, after Charles Spencer, 3rd Earl of Sunderland (1675–1722)
- Topsfield, for Toppesfield, Essex
- Woburn, for Woburn, Bedfordshire
- Worcester, after Worcester, Worcestershire, England
- Wrentham, for Wrentham, Suffolk

=== Michigan ===
- Birmingham, Oakland County after Birmingham, West Midlands.
- Sherwood, for Sherwood Forest, Nottinghamshire

=== Missouri ===
- Leeds (area of Kansas City), for Leeds, West Riding of Yorkshire.
- Sheffield (area of Kansas City), for Sheffield, West Riding of Yorkshire.

=== New Hampshire ===
- New Hampshire state (after Hampshire)
- Acworth, New Hampshire for Sir Jacob Acworth, a former Surveyor of the Royal Navy.
- Allenstown, New Hampshire for Samuel Allen, English proprietor and governor of the Province of New Hampshire
- Alton, New Hampshire for Alton, a small market town in Hampshire, England.
- Amherst, New Hampshire for General Jeffery Amherst, who served as Commander-in-Chief, North America during the French and Indian War.
- Barrington, New Hampshire, named for Samuel Shute of Barrington Hall, colonial governor of Massachusetts and New Hampshire. His brother was John Shute Barrington, 1st Viscount Barrington.
- Bath, New Hampshire, for the politician William Pulteney, 1st Earl of Bath.
- Bedford, New Hampshire, for John Russell, 4th Duke of Bedford
- Boscawen, New Hampshire, for Edward Boscawen, the British admiral who distinguished himself at the 1758 Siege of Louisbourg.
- Brentwood, New Hampshire, named after Brentwood, Essex
- Cheshire County, for Cheshire.
- Croydon, named for Croydon, Surrey.
- Dorchester, named for Dorchester in Dorset, England.
- Dover, for Dover, Kent
- Effingham, for the Howard family, who were Earls of Effingham
- Epping was named for Epping in England.
- Epsom takes its name from Epsom in Surrey, England.
- Exeter was named after Exeter in Devon, England.
- Fitzwilliam was named after William Fitzwilliam, 4th Earl Fitzwilliam, a British Whig statesman of the late 18th and early 19th centuries
- Grafton, both the town and the county, take their names from Augustus FitzRoy, 3rd Duke of Grafton,
- Grantham takes its name from Thomas Robinson, 1st Baron Grantham, Secretary of State for the Southern Department from March 1754 to October 1755.
- Hampstead was incorporated in 1749 by colonial governor Benning Wentworth, who renamed it after Hampstead, England, the residence of William Pitt, a close friend.
- Hampton was settled in 1638 by a group of parishioners led by Oxford University graduate Reverend Stephen Bachiler, who had formerly preached at the settlement's namesake: Hampton, England.
- Henniker, was named for Sir John Henniker, a London merchant of leather and fur, with shipping interests in Boston and Portsmouth.
- Hillsborough County, and Hillsborough, after Wills Hill, 1st Earl of Hillsborough (1718–1793).
- Holderness was named after Robert Darcy, 4th Earl of Holderness.
- Hollis for Thomas Hollis a wealthy English merchant and a benefactor of Harvard University.
- Kensington, named for Baron Kensington, owner of Kensington Palace in London.
- Kingston in 1694, King William III of England granted a royal charter establishing the town of "Kingstown", so the town was named in honor of the King and residents from Kingston, Massachusetts
- Landaff, after the Bishop of Llandaff, chaplain to England's King George III.
- Lee, named for British General Charles Lee, who later joined the American Revolution.
- Lincoln was named after Henry Fiennes Pelham-Clinton, 2nd Duke of Newcastle, 9th Earl of Lincoln – a cousin of the Wentworth governors. He held the position of comptroller of customs for the port of London under King George II and George III, which was important to trade between America and England
- Litchfield In 1749, the land was granted to another group of settlers and named "Litchfield" after George Henry Lee, Earl of Lichfield. Litchfield was incorporated into the Province of New Hampshire on June 5, 1749
- Manchester after Manchester, England
- Marlow was named after Marlow, England, located on the River Thames in Buckinghamshire.
- Mason, was named in honor of New Hampshire's founder, Captain John Mason
- Middleton was named after Sir Charles Middleton, 1st Baron Barham, who was in charge of convoy service between Barbados and the colonies.
- Milton is either a contraction of "mill town", or else derived from a relative of the Wentworth colonial governors—William Fitzwilliam, Earl Fitzwilliam and Viscount Milton.
- Nelson was originally named Packersfield, but was renamed in 1814 to Nelson in honor of Viscount Horatio Nelson, British admiral and naval hero.
- New London is officially renamed after London
- Newington was named after a village in England where the first bell in its meetinghouse was made, although it is unsure which Newington in England this was.
- Newport was named in 1761 for Henry Newport, a distinguished English soldier and statesman.
- Northumberland, was regranted by Governor John Wentworth in 1771 as "Northumberland", the name derived from Northumberland in England.
- Nottingham was named for Daniel Finch, 2nd Earl of Nottingham
- Portsmouth, New Hampshire, for Portsmouth
- Strafford County, for William Wentworth, 2nd Earl of Strafford (1626–1695).
- Winchester, New Hampshire, for Charles Powlett, 3rd Duke of Bolton who also served as the Marquess of Winchester

=== New Jersey ===
- Amwell, for Amwell, Hertfordshire.
- Andover, for Andover, Hampshire
- Asbury Park, named for Staffordshire-born bishop Francis Asbury (1745-1816)
- Avon-by-the-Sea, New Jersey for Avon, England
- Beverly, for Beverley, East Riding of Yorkshire
- Burlington County with Burlington for Bridlington, East Riding of Yorkshire
- Camden named by local Jacob Cooper after Charles Pratt, 1st Earl Camden.
- Chesterfield, for Chesterfield, Derbyshire.
- Cumberland County named for Prince William, Duke of Cumberland (1721–1765).
- Deal, for Deal, Kent
- Deptford, for the port Deptford, Kent.
- Dover, for Dover, Kent
- Essex County, for the county English county Essex.
- Gloucester County and Gloucester City after the city of Gloucester / county of Gloucestershire in England.
- Kenilworth, for Kenilworth Castle, Warwickshire
- Leeds Point, for Daniel Leeds, 17th century local surveyor born in Leeds, West Riding of Yorkshire.
- Mansfield, for Mansfield, Nottinghamshire.
- Margate City, for Margate, Kent
- New Durham, for Durham, County Durham.
- Newark for Newark-on-Trent, Nottinghamshire.
- Penns Grove, Penns Neck and Pennsville, for English Quaker William Penn (1644–1718).
- Shrewsbury, for Shrewsbury, Shropshire.
- Somerset County with Somerville, for the English county Somerset.
- Stafford, New Jersey, named for the English county of Staffordshire, of which Stafford is the county town.
- Woolwich, for Woolwich, London.

=== New York ===
- Cornwall (originally "New Cornwall") after the county of Cornwall in southwest England
- Liverpool Village after Liverpool England.
- New York City (after the Duke of York)
- New York (State) (also after the Duke of York)
- Scarsdale, after Scarsdale in northern Derbyshire, England.
- Suffolk County after Suffolk, England

=== North Carolina ===
- The province, named Carolina (The Carolinas-North and South) to honor King Charles I of England, was divided into SC and NC in 1729, although the actual date is the subject of debate.
- Bertie County, for the English politicians Henry (1675-1735) and James Bertie (1674-1735)
- Bladen County, named for Yorkshire-born politician Martin Bladen (1680–1746).
- Charlotte, North Carolina named after Charlotte of Mecklenburg-Strelitz
- Cumberland, named for Prince William, Duke of Cumberland (1721-1765).
- Craven County, named after Yorkshire-born nobleman William Craven, 1st Earl of Craven (1608–1697).
- Durants Neck (now New Hope, Perquimans County), named for Worcestershire-born pioneer George Durant (1632-1692).
- Hyde County, for the Cheshire-born 1st Governor of North Carolina Edward Hyde (1667–1712).
- Macclesfield, for Macclesfield, Cheshire.
- New London, for London, England
- Onslow County, after Middlesex-born Arthur Onslow (1691–1768), Speaker of the House of Commons.
- Raleigh after Sir Walter Raleigh, one of the first English explorers of the Carolinas.
- Wickham Precinct (now Hyde County), from Temple Wycombe, Buckinghamshire
- Wilkes County, with Wilkesboro, named for London-born politician John Wilkes (1725-1797).

=== Ohio ===
- Kendal, Ohio after Kendal, Westmorland.
- Liverpool, Medina County Ohio and East Liverpool, Ohio, after Liverpool, England.

=== Pennsylvania ===
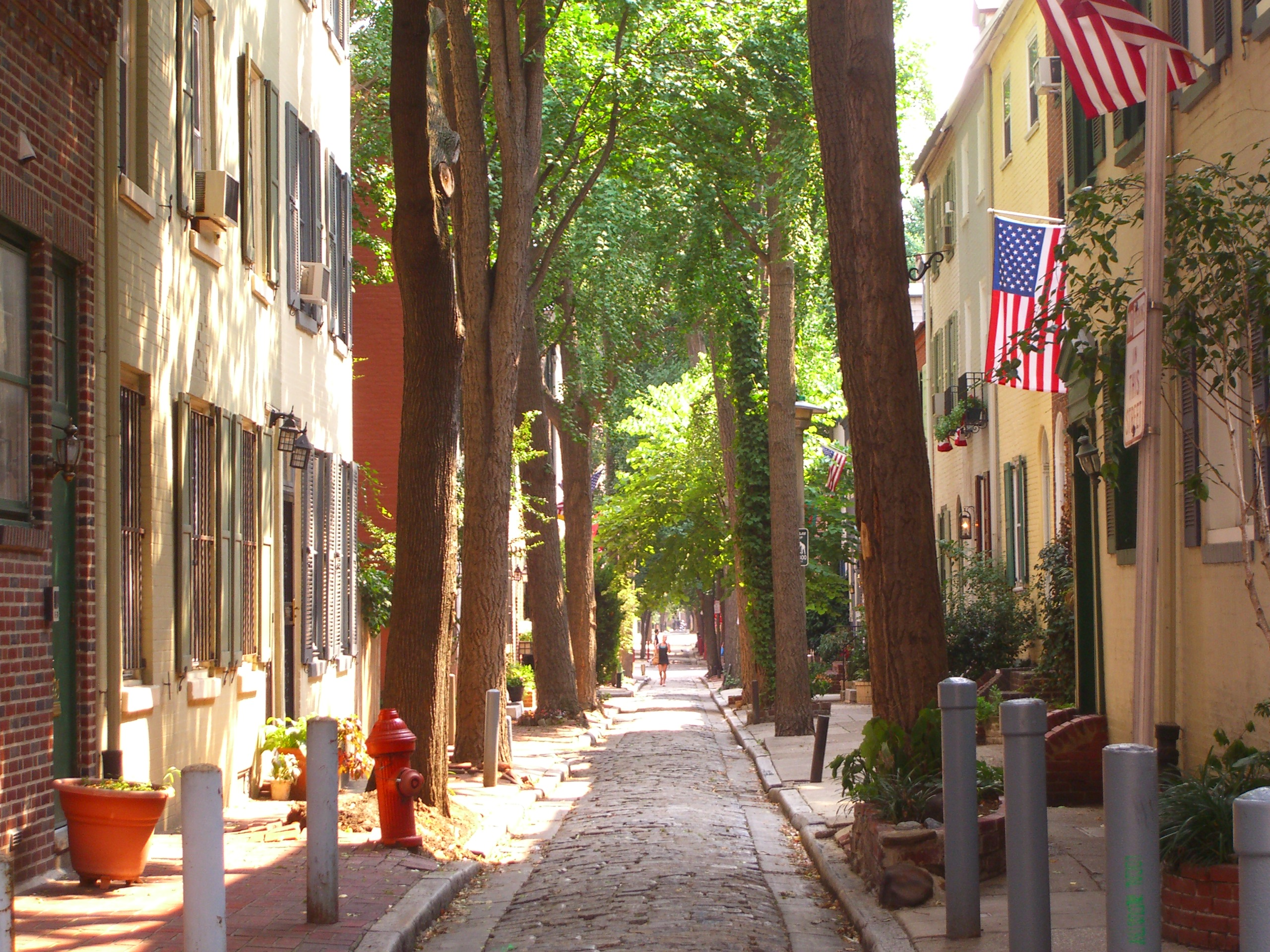
Pennsylvania and the Delaware Valley were settled from the century by Quakers from the North Midlands and Pennines of England, with many Pennsylvania place names reflecting this settlement.

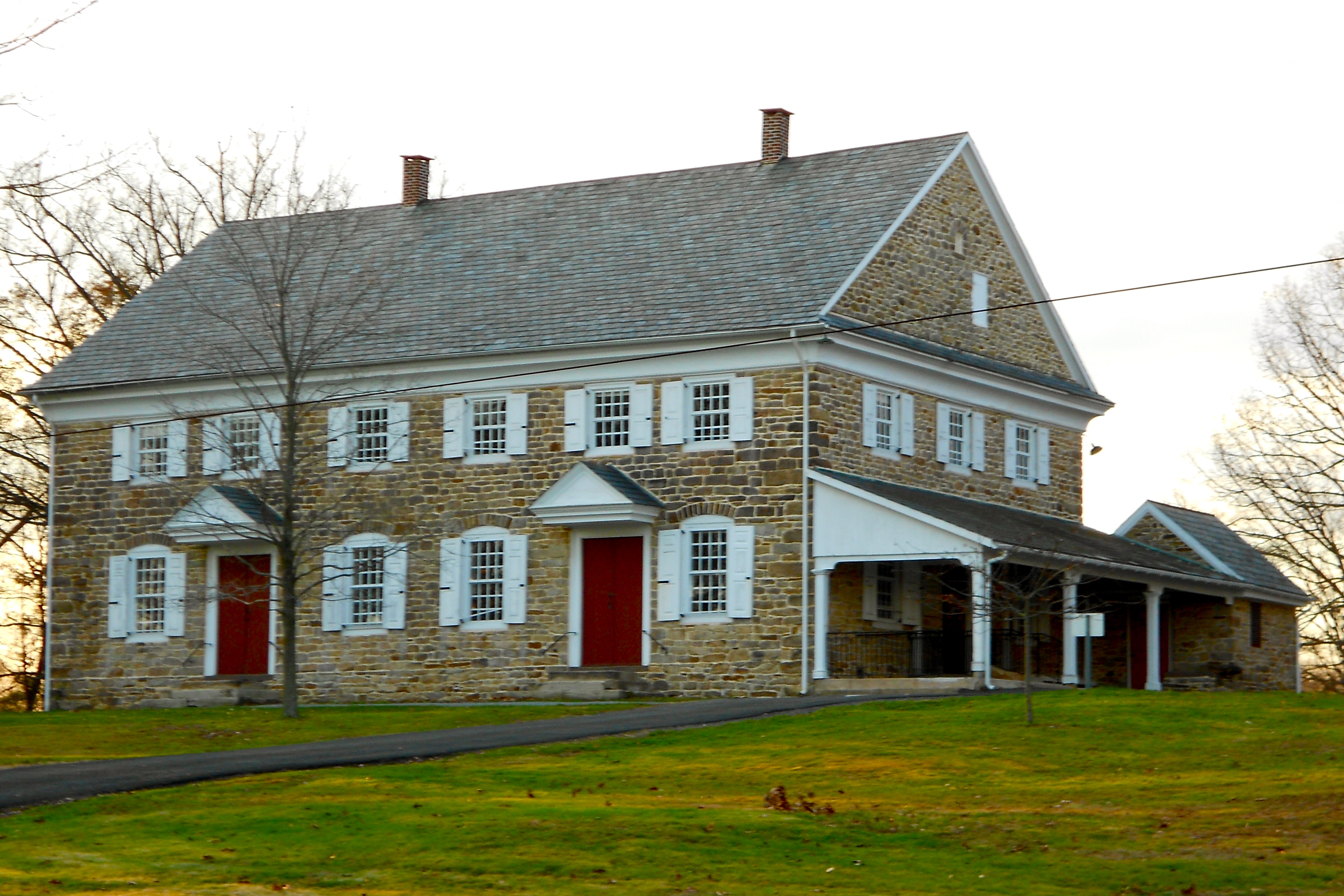
Quaker architecture in the state mirrors that in England.

- Ardsley, for Ardsley, West Riding of Yorkshire
- Bedford and Bedford County after Bedford, England
- Berks County after Berkshire (pronounced "Barkshire"), England
- Berwick, for Berwick-upon-Tweed, Northumberland
- Birmingham, Chester County, for Birmingham, Warwickshire
- Bolton Mansion (or Phineas Pemberton House), for Bolton, Lancashire
- Bristol and Bristol Township after Bristol, England
- Bucks County after Buckinghamshire, England
- Burholme, for Burholme (Forest of Bowland), West Riding of Yorkshire
- Carlisle, after Carlisle, England which, like the northern English city, is in a county called Cumberland.
- Chester County and Chester after Chester, England
- Darby derived from Derby (pronounced "Darby"), the county town of Derbyshire (pronounced "Darbyshire")
- Durham, for Durham, County Durham
- Edgmont, for Edgmond, Shropshire.
- Horsham after Horsham (pronounced "Hor-sham"), England
- Lancaster County and Lancaster after the city of Lancaster in the county of Lancashire in England, the native home of John Wright, one of the early settlers.
- Liverpool, for Liverpool, Lancashire.
- Malvern, for the Malvern Hills in England.
- Marple, after Marple in the Cheshire Pennines.
- New Castle after Newcastle upon Tyne, England
- Northampton County after Northamptonshire, England
- Pendle Hill, named for Pendle Hill, Lancashire.
- Reading, Berks County after Reading (pronounced "Redding"), Berkshire (pronounced "Barkshire"), England
- Rydal, for Rydal, Westmorland
- Sheffield, for Sheffield, West Riding of Yorkshire
- Swarthmore, named for Swarthmoor, Lancashire.
- Trafford for Trafford, Lancashire.
- Warminster after the small town of Warminster in the county of Wiltshire, at the western extremity of Salisbury Plain, England.
- Warrington after Warrington, England
- Warwick after Warwick, England
- Westmoreland County, for Westmorland, a county in northwest England.
- York, Pennsylvania, named for York, the county town of the English county of Yorkshire, the ancestral home county of many Quaker settlers in the region.

=== Rhode Island ===
- Lonsdale, for Lonsdale, Lancashire and Westmorland.

=== South Carolina ===
- Charleston, South Carolina, named after Charles II of England
- Chesterfield County, for English politician Philip Stanhope, 4th Earl of Chesterfield (1694-1773).
- Colleton County, for Sir John Colleton, 1st Baronet (1608-1666), an early English proprietor in the Carolinas.
- Edgecombe County, for English politician Richard Edgecumbe, 1st Baron Edgecumbe (1680-1758).
- Georgetown, for George I of Great Britain (1660-1727).
- Kershaw County, for the prominent Kershaw family from which Joseph B. Kershaw (1822-1894) came, originally from Sowerby, West Riding of Yorkshire.

=== Tennessee ===
- Acton, for Acton, London.
- Amherst, for the Kent-born general Jeffery Amherst, 1st Baron Amherst (1717–1779).
- Cambridge, for Cambridge University, Cambridgeshire
- Carlisle, if not for the Pennsylvania city, then named for Carlisle, Cumberland.
- Cumberland City, for the county Cumberland in North West England.
- Dover, for the White Cliffs of Dover, Kent.
- Harrogate, named after Harrogate, West Riding of Yorkshire.
- Kingsport, named for English-born James King (born 1752), who established a mill in the area in 1773.
- Manchester, after Manchester, Lancashire, England, for hopes that it, like the English Manchester, would become a similarly prosperous industrial city.
- Pall Mall, for Pall Mall, London
- Rugby, after Rugby School, Rugby, Warwickshire.
- Westmoreland, named after Westmorland, a county in northwest England.

=== Texas ===
- Bronte, named for English novelist Charlotte Brontë (1816–1855).
- Cheapside, after Cheapside, a London street.
- Derby, after Derby, England.
- Liverpool, after Liverpool, a port city traditionally in Lancashire, England.
- Newcastle, after Newcastle upon Tyne, northeast England.

=== Vermont ===
- Barnet, for Barnet, Middlesex
- St. Albans, named after St Albans in Hertfordshire, England.

=== Virginia ===
- The name Virginia was first applied by Queen Elizabeth I (the "Virgin Queen") and Sir Walter Raleigh in 1584.
- Bath County, named for Bath, Somerset.
- Charles City, named for Charles I of England (1600–1649)
- Chesterfield County, for Philip Stanhope, 4th Earl of Chesterfield (1694–1773).
- Crewe, for Crewe, Cheshire.
- Exmore, for Exmoor, Devon.
- Farnham, for Farnham, Surrey.
- Gloucester County, named for Henry Stuart, Duke of Gloucester (1640–1660).
- Hampstead, for Hampstead, London
- Isle of Wight County, for Isle of Wight, English Channel.
- James River, for James I of England (1566–1625)
- Keswick, Albermarle County, for Keswick, Cumberland.
- Leedstown, formerly Leeds, for Leeds, Yorkshire.
- Malvern Hill, named for the Malvern Hills, southwestern England.
- Norfolk after the county of Norfolk, England
- Northampton, from Northamptonshire, a county in the English South Midlands.
- Northumberland County, Virginia, after Northumberland, a county in northeast England.
- Portsmouth after Portsmouth, England
- Richmond named by William Byrd II after Richmond, London where he spent part of his childhood.
- Stafford County with Stafford, from Staffordshire, of which Stafford is the county town.
- Suffolk after the county of Suffolk, England
- Sunderland Creek (now Lagrange Creek), for Henry Spencer, 1st Earl of Sunderland (1620–1643), if not for Sunderland, County Durham.
- Surry County, for Surrey, a county in southeast England.
- Westmoreland County, Virginia, after Westmorland, a county in northwest England.
- Yorkshire, Virginia for the county Yorkshire in northern England.

=== West Virginia ===
- Arden, Berkeley County, named for Arden in Warwickshire.
- Carlisle, named for Carlisle, Cumberland, the ancestral home of an early settler.
- Chester, possibly for Chester, the county town of Cheshire.
- England Run, a river in Braxton County and tributary of the Little Kanawha, named after England itself.
- English, named for the nationality of many coal miners in the area.
- Evenwood, named for Evenwood, County Durham, the birthplace of the parents of T.W. Raine, an early inhabitant.
- Hallidon, named after Halidon Hill, the site of a 1333 battle in Northumberland, near the Anglo-Scottish border.
- Kendalia, named for the original landowner, Mr. Kendall who was also born at Kendal, Westmorland, England.
- Liverpool, named for Liverpool, Lancashire.
- Romney, named for Romney, one of the Cinque Ports.
- Saint Albans, probably for St Albans, Hertfordshire.
- Scarbro, named for Scarborough in the North Riding of Yorkshire, owing to the prevalence of "Scarbrough" as a local surname.
- Selbyville, named in 1870 for Lord Thomas Selby, a member of the English gentry.
- Skelton, for Skelton, North Riding of Yorkshire (near York).

=== Wisconsin ===
- Cambridge, Wisconsin, from Cambridge, England
- Chilton, Wisconsin, from Chillington Hall, Staffordshire, the English ancestral home of an early settler.
- Plymouth, Wisconsin, after Plymouth, England, and Plymouth, Massachusetts.
- Ripon, Wisconsin, after Ripon, North Yorkshire, the English ancestral home city of one of its earliest settlers, John S. Horner.

== Notable people ==
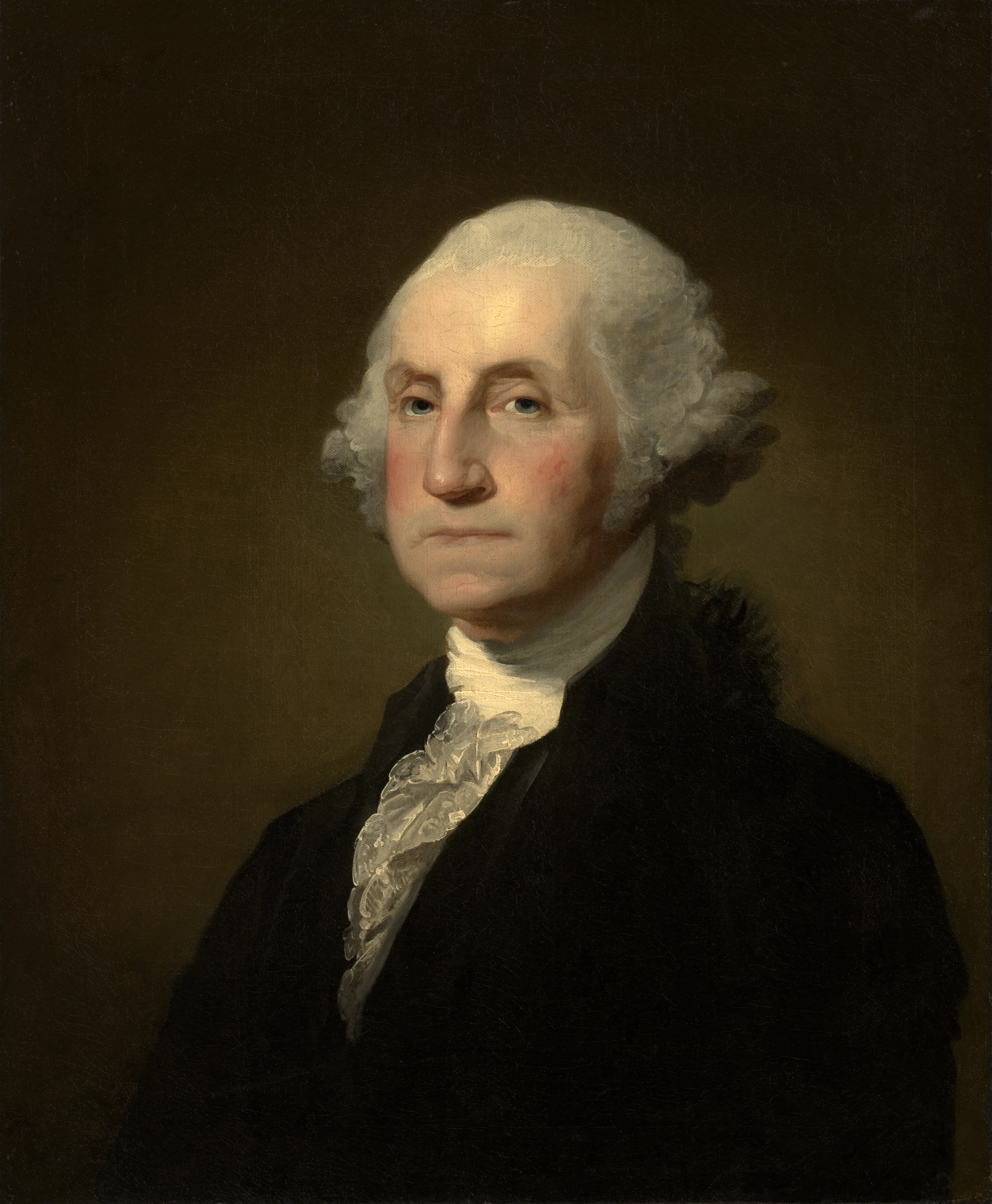
George Washington

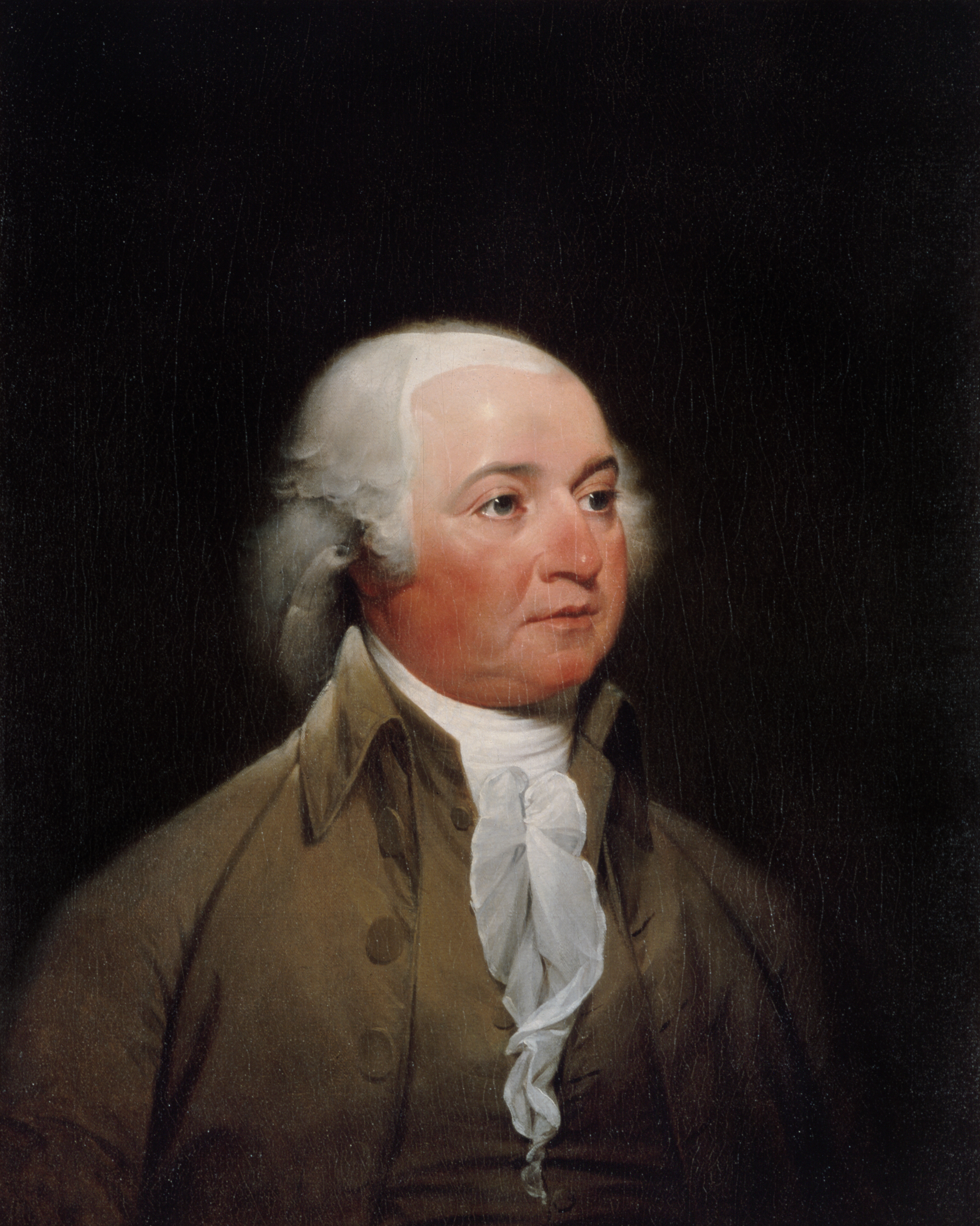
John Adams

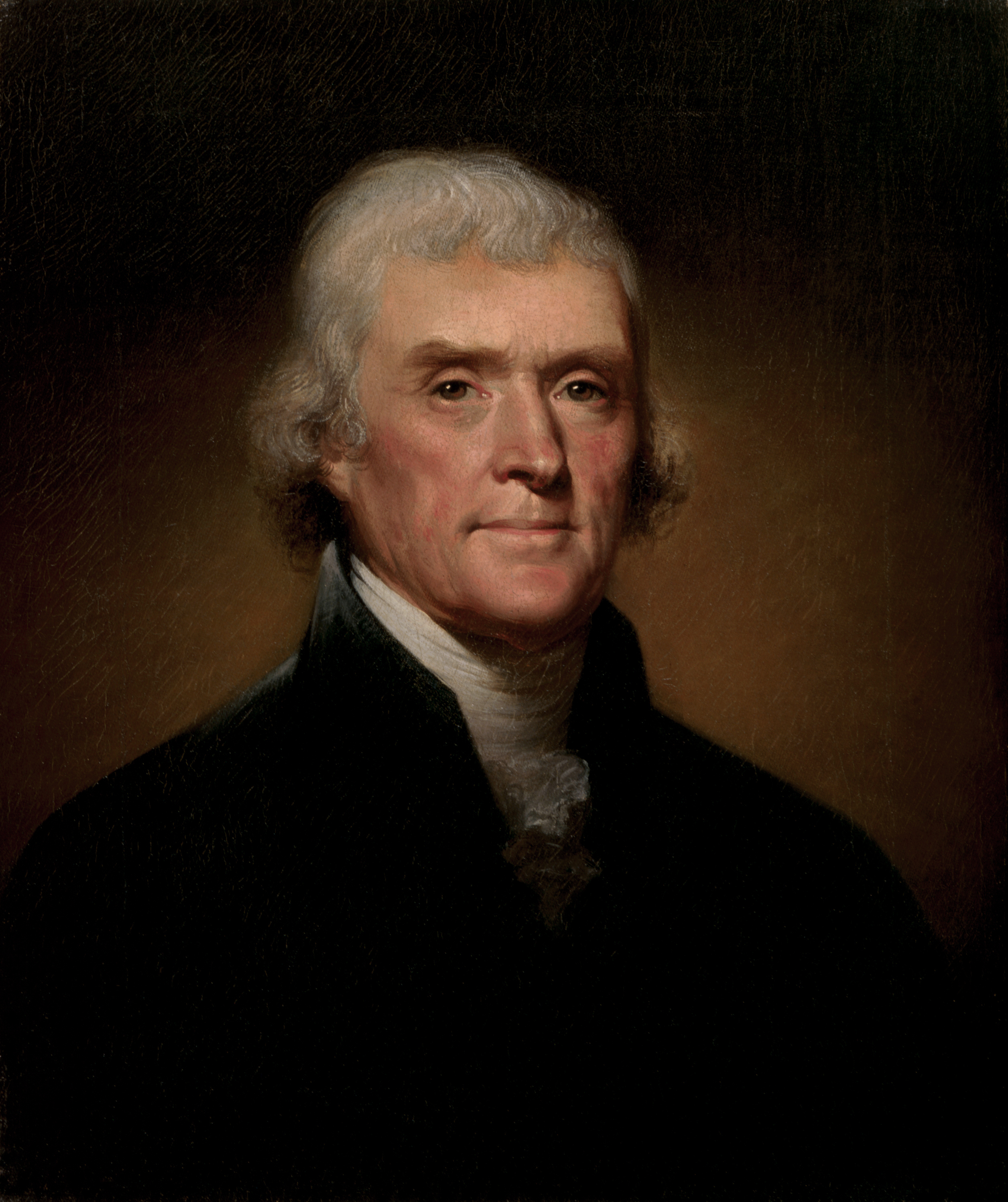
Thomas Jefferson

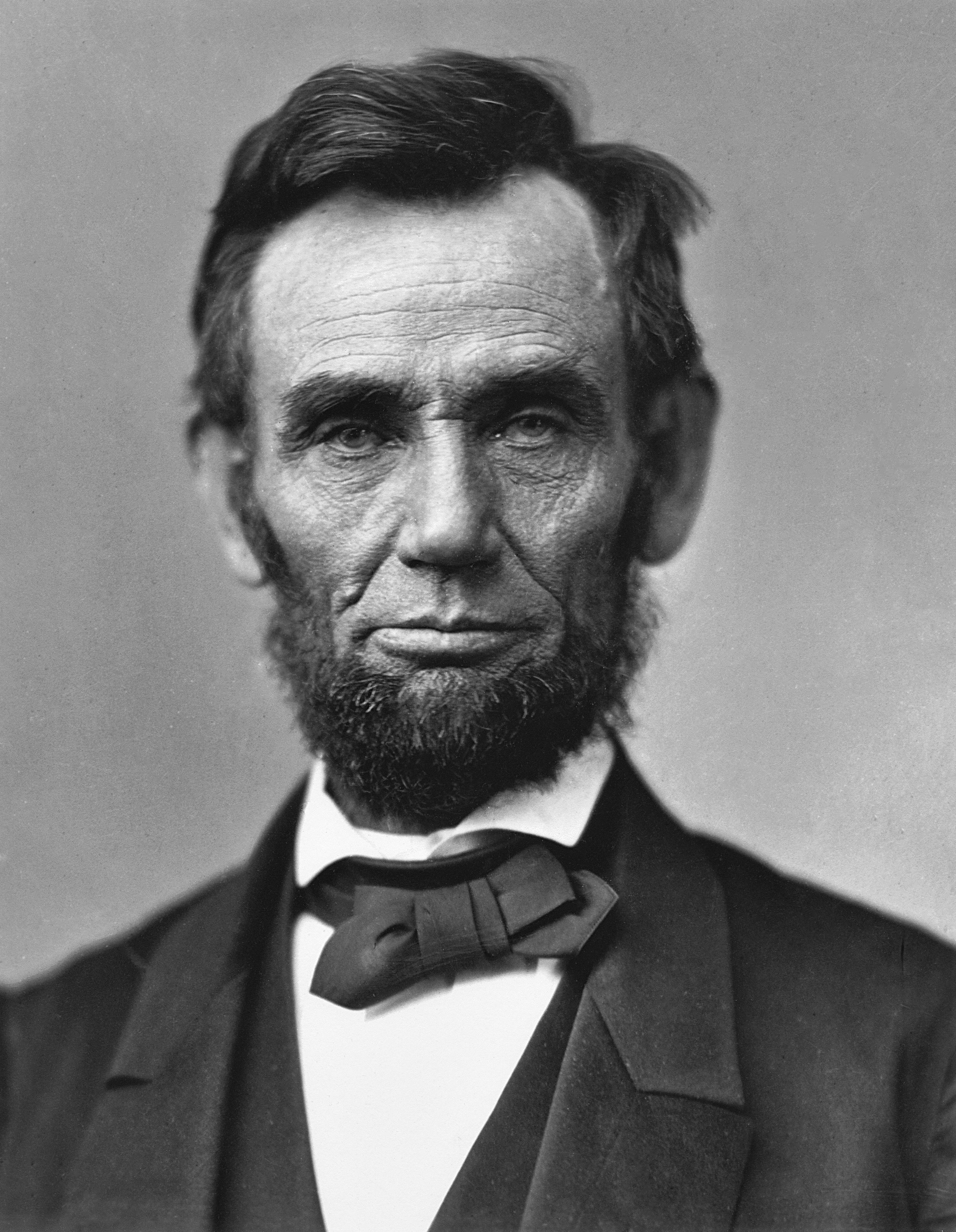
Abraham Lincoln

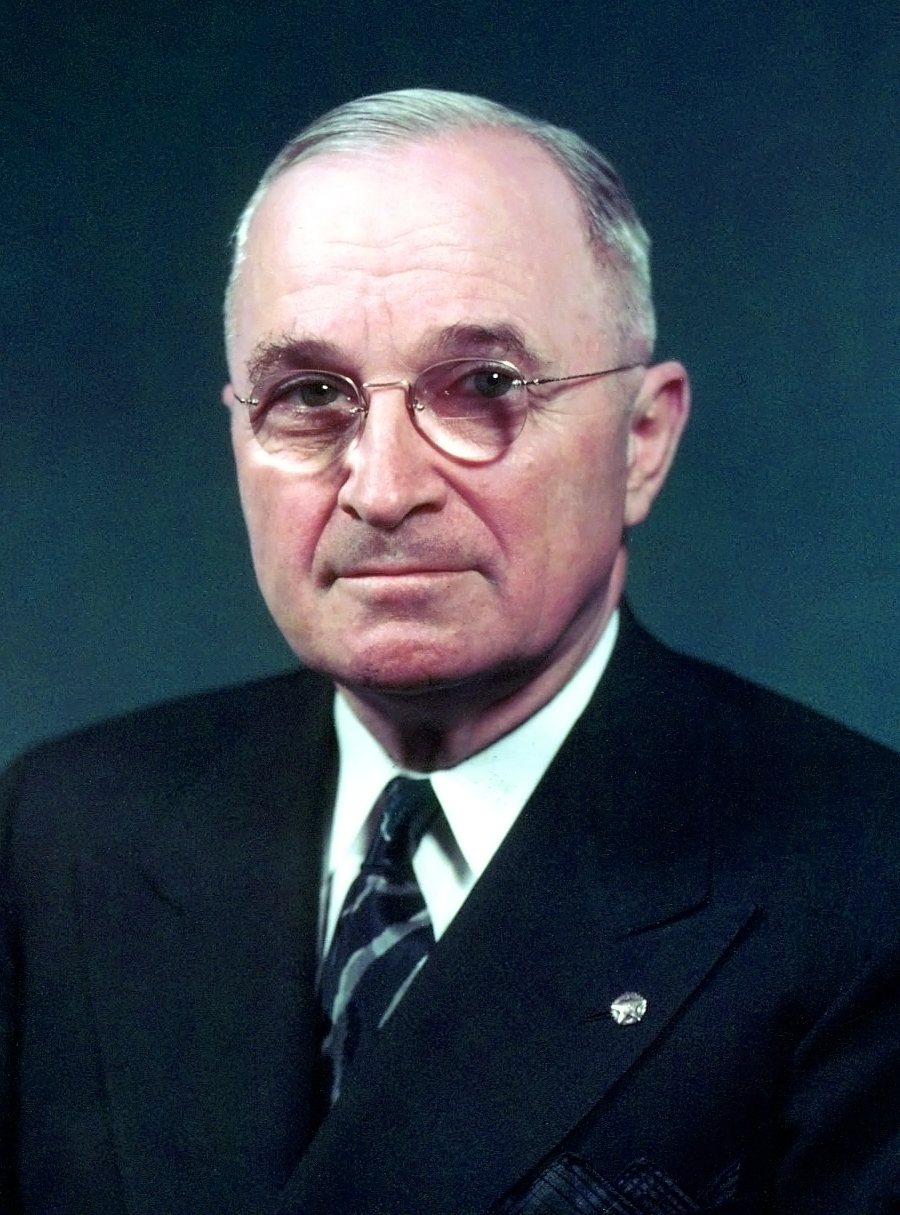
Harry S. Truman

Richard Nixon

George W. Bush

Barack Obama

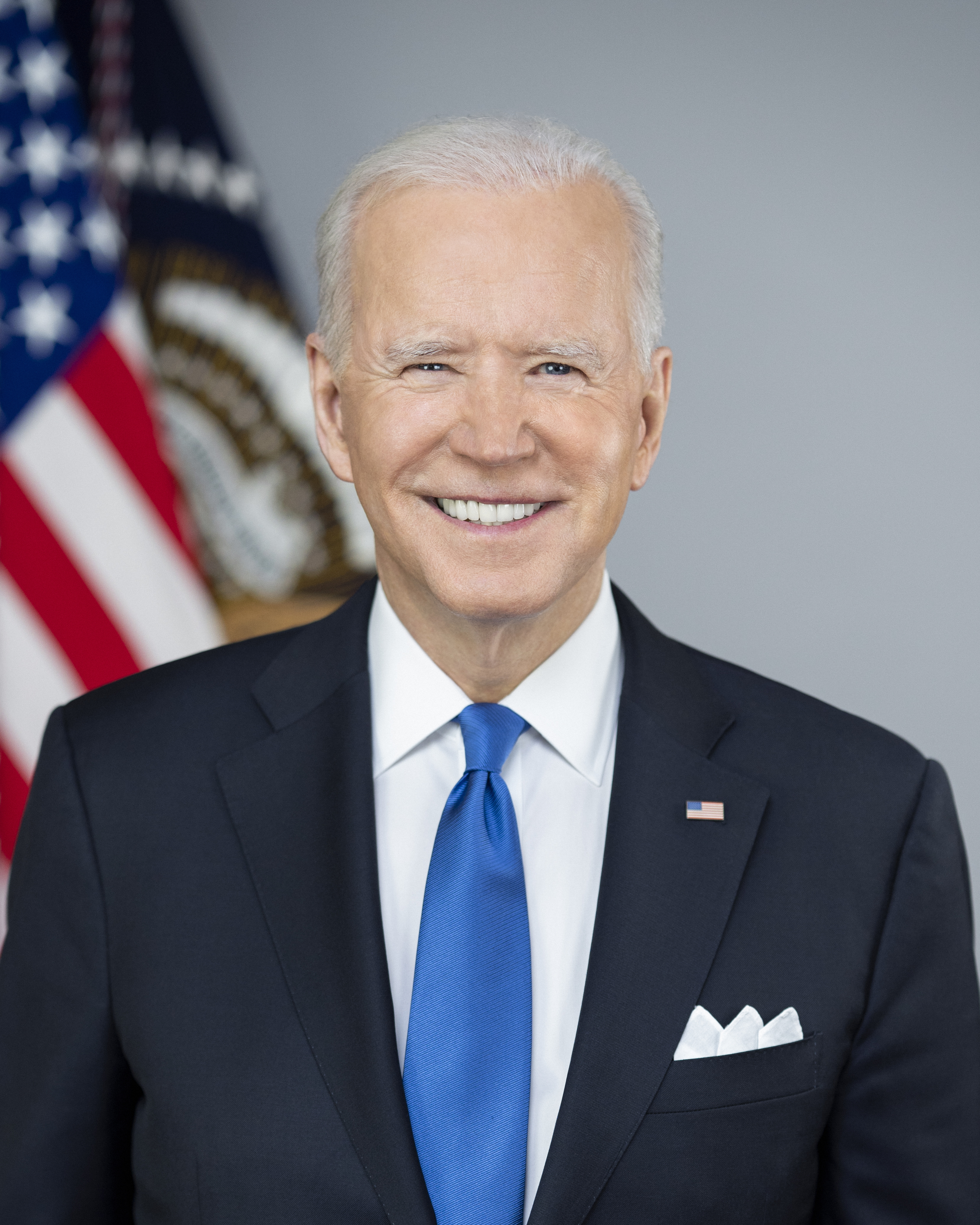
Joe Biden

=== Presidents of English descent ===
Most of the presidents of the United States have had English ancestry. The extent of English heritage varies. Earlier presidents were predominantly of colonial English Yankee origin. Later presidents' ancestry can often be traced to ancestors from multiple nations in Europe, including England. The presidents who have lacked recent English ancestry are Martin Van Buren, Dwight D. Eisenhower, John F. Kennedy, and Donald Trump.

=== 18th century ===
George Washington, John Adams.

=== 19th century ===
Thomas Jefferson, James Madison John Quincy Adams, Andrew Jackson, William Henry Harrison, John Tyler, Zachary Taylor, Millard Fillmore, Franklin Pierce, Abraham Lincoln, Andrew Johnson, Ulysses S. Grant, Rutherford B. Hayes, James A. Garfield, Chester A. Arthur, Grover Cleveland, Benjamin Harrison, William McKinley.

=== 20th century ===
Theodore Roosevelt, William Howard Taft, Warren G. Harding, Calvin Coolidge, Herbert Hoover, Franklin D. Roosevelt, Harry S. Truman, Lyndon B. Johnson, Richard Nixon, Gerald Ford, Jimmy Carter, Ronald Reagan, George H. W. Bush, Bill Clinton.

=== 21st century ===
George W. Bush, Barack Obama, Joe Biden.

== See also ==
- American ethnicity
- Ancestral background of presidents of the United States
- Americans or American people
- New England
- Anglo-America
- Anglo-American relations
- Anglo-Celtic Australians
- Boston Brahmin
- British Americans
- Demographic history of the United States
- English (ethnic group)
- English Australians
- English Canadians
- English New Zealanders
- English diaspora
- England
- European Americans
- Immigration to the United States
- Maps of American ancestries
- Non-Hispanic whites
- Old Stock Americans
- Scotch-Irish Americans
- Scottish Americans
- Welsh Americans
- White Americans
- White Anglo-Saxon Protestants
- White Southerners
- Yankee
- English people in Paraguay
- English Chileans
- English Argentines
- English settlement in Nicaragua
- Slavery in the colonial history of the United States
- Black people
- Atlantic slave trade
- Treatment of slaves in the United States
- African-American history
