= List of municipalities in Georgia (U.S. state) =

Map of the United States with Georgia highlighted

Georgia is a state located in the Southern United States. According to the 2020 United States census, Georgia was the 8th most populous state with 10,711,908 inhabitants and the 21st largest by land area spanning 57,513.49 square miles (148,959.3 km^{2}) of land. Georgia is divided into 159 counties and contains 535 municipalities consisting of cities, towns, consolidated city-counties, and consolidated cities.

There is no legal difference in Georgia between cities and towns. Eight municipalities have merged with their counties to form consolidated city-counties: Athens with Clarke County, Augusta with Richmond County, Columbus with Muscogee County, Cusseta with Chattahoochee County, Georgetown with Quitman County, Macon with Bibb County, Statenville with Echols County, and Webster County unified government with Webster County. Athens and Augusta also have municipalities independent of the consolidated governments and are considered consolidated cities.

The largest municipality by population in Georgia is Atlanta, with 498,715 residents, and the smallest municipality by population is Aldora, with 0 residents, although the actual estimated population is at 103, due to a "0% self-response rate". The largest municipality by land area is Augusta, a consolidated city-county, which spans 302.47 mi^{2} (783.4 km^{2}), and Edge Hill and Santa Claus are tied for the smallest, at 0.18 mi^{2} (0.47 km^{2}) each. (Note: The city of Payne was abolished on March 27, 2015 by the Georgia General Assembly.)

== List of municipalities ==
County seat†

State capital and county seat‡

Name	Type	County	Population (2020)	Population (2010)	Change (%)	Land area (2010)		Population density
Name	Type	County	Population (2020)	Population (2010)	Change (%)	sq mi	km^{2}	Population density
Abbeville †	City	Wilcox	2,685	2,908	−7.7%	3.06	7.9	877.5/sq mi (338.8/km^{2})
Acworth	City	Cobb	22,440	20,425	+9.9%	8.24	21.3	2,723.3/sq mi (1,051.5/km^{2})
Adairsville	City	Bartow	4,878	4,648	+4.9%	9.11	23.6	535.5/sq mi (206.7/km^{2})
Adel †	City	Cook	5,571	5,334	+4.4%	8.06	20.9	691.2/sq mi (266.9/km^{2})
Adrian	City	Emanuel, Johnson	552	664	−16.9%	1.37	3.5	402.9/sq mi (155.6/km^{2})
Ailey	City	Montgomery	519	432	+20.1%	2.01	5.2	258.2/sq mi (99.7/km^{2})
Alamo †	City	Wheeler	771	2,797	−72.4%	1.96	5.1	393.4/sq mi (151.9/km^{2})
Alapaha	Town	Berrien	481	668	−28.0%	1.03	2.7	467.0/sq mi (180.3/km^{2})
Albany †	City	Dougherty	69,647	77,434	−10.1%	55.13	142.8	1,263.3/sq mi (487.8/km^{2})
Aldora	Town	Lamar	0	103	−100.0%	0.24	0.62	0.0/sq mi (0.0/km^{2})
Allenhurst	City	Liberty	816	695	+17.4%	1.10	2.8	741.8/sq mi (286.4/km^{2})
Allentown	Town	Bleckley, Laurens, Twiggs, Wilkinson	195	169	+15.4%	3.07	8.0	63.5/sq mi (24.5/km^{2})
Alma †	City	Bacon	3,433	3,466	−1.0%	5.52	14.3	621.9/sq mi (240.1/km^{2})
Alpharetta	City	Fulton	65,818	57,551	+14.4%	26.91	69.7	2,445.9/sq mi (944.4/km^{2})
Alston	Town	Montgomery	178	159	+11.9%	2.85	7.4	62.5/sq mi (24.1/km^{2})
Alto	Town	Banks, Habersham	970	1,172	−17.2%	1.11	2.9	873.9/sq mi (337.4/km^{2})
Ambrose	City	Coffee	327	380	−13.9%	3.05	7.9	107.2/sq mi (41.4/km^{2})
Americus †	City	Sumter	16,230	17,041	−4.8%	11.24	29.1	1,444.0/sq mi (557.5/km^{2})
Andersonville	City	Sumter	237	255	−7.1%	1.38	3.6	171.7/sq mi (66.3/km^{2})
Arabi	Town	Crisp	447	586	−23.7%	6.31	16.3	70.8/sq mi (27.4/km^{2})
Aragon	City	Polk	1,440	1,249	+15.3%	1.12	2.9	1,285.7/sq mi (496.4/km^{2})
Arcade	City	Jackson	1,884	1,786	+5.5%	8.43	21.8	223.5/sq mi (86.3/km^{2})
Argyle	Town	Clinch	190	212	−10.4%	1.72	4.5	110.5/sq mi (42.7/km^{2})
Arlington	City	Calhoun, Early	1,209	1,479	−18.3%	4.12	10.7	293.4/sq mi (113.3/km^{2})
Arnoldsville	City	Oglethorpe	431	357	+20.7%	1.70	4.4	253.5/sq mi (97.9/km^{2})
Ashburn †	City	Turner	4,291	4,152	+3.3%	4.72	12.2	909.1/sq mi (351.0/km^{2})
Athens † (Note: Population and area refer to the balance of the Athens-Clarke County unified government which does not include independent town of Bogart which is partially in Clarke County and the city of Winterville which is entirely located within Clarke County.)	Consolidated city-county	Clarke	127,315	115,452	+10.3%	116.36	301.4	1,094.1/sq mi (422.5/km^{2})
Atlanta ‡	City	Fulton (seat), DeKalb	498,715	420,003	+18.7%	133.15	344.9	3,745.5/sq mi (1,446.2/km^{2})
Attapulgus	City	Decatur	454	449	+1.1%	0.80	2.1	567.5/sq mi (219.1/km^{2})
Auburn	City	Barrow, Gwinnett	7,495	6,887	+8.8%	6.45	16.7	1,162.0/sq mi (448.7/km^{2})
Augusta † (Note: Population and area refer to the balance of the Augusta-Richmond County unified government which does not include independent city of Blythe which is partially in Richmond County and the city of Hephzibah which is entirely located within Richmond County.)	Consolidated city-county	Richmond	202,081	195,844	+3.2%	302.47	783.4	668.1/sq mi (258.0/km^{2})
Austell	City	Cobb, Douglas	7,713	6,581	+17.2%	5.97	15.5	1,292.0/sq mi (498.8/km^{2})
Avalon	Town	Stephens	233	213	+9.4%	1.77	4.6	131.6/sq mi (50.8/km^{2})
Avera	City	Jefferson	223	246	−9.3%	0.65	1.7	343.1/sq mi (132.5/km^{2})
Avondale Estates	City	DeKalb	3,567	2,960	+20.5%	1.14	3.0	3,128.9/sq mi (1,208.1/km^{2})
Baconton	City	Mitchell	856	915	−6.4%	1.95	5.1	439.0/sq mi (169.5/km^{2})
Bainbridge †	City	Decatur	14,468	12,697	+13.9%	18.80	48.7	769.6/sq mi (297.1/km^{2})
Baldwin	City	Banks, Habersham	3,629	3,279	+10.7%	4.91	12.7	739.1/sq mi (285.4/km^{2})
Ball Ground	City	Cherokee	2,560	1,433	+78.6%	5.81	15.0	440.6/sq mi (170.1/km^{2})
Barnesville †	City	Lamar	6,292	6,755	−6.9%	6.07	15.7	1,036.6/sq mi (400.2/km^{2})
Bartow	Town	Jefferson	186	286	−35.0%	1.13	2.9	164.6/sq mi (63.6/km^{2})
Barwick	City	Brooks, Thomas	363	386	−6.0%	0.72	1.9	504.2/sq mi (194.7/km^{2})
Baxley †	City	Appling	4,942	4,400	+12.3%	8.38	21.7	589.7/sq mi (227.7/km^{2})
Bellville	City	Evans	127	123	+3.3%	0.99	2.6	128.3/sq mi (49.5/km^{2})
Berkeley Lake	City	Gwinnett	2,054	1,574	+30.5%	1.08	2.8	1,901.9/sq mi (734.3/km^{2})
Berlin	Town	Colquitt	511	551	−7.3%	0.74	1.9	690.5/sq mi (266.6/km^{2})
Bethlehem	Town	Barrow	715	601	+19.0%	2.33	6.0	306.9/sq mi (118.5/km^{2})
Between	Town	Walton	402	296	+35.8%	1.18	3.1	340.7/sq mi (131.5/km^{2})
Bishop	Town	Oconee	332	224	+48.2%	0.78	2.0	425.6/sq mi (164.3/km^{2})
Blackshear †	City	Pierce	3,506	3,445	+1.8%	4.36	11.3	804.1/sq mi (310.5/km^{2})
Blairsville †	City	Union	616	652	−5.5%	1.11	2.9	555.0/sq mi (214.3/km^{2})
Blakely †	City	Early	5,371	5,068	+6.0%	17.55	45.5	306.0/sq mi (118.2/km^{2})
Bloomingdale	City	Chatham	2,790	2,713	+2.8%	12.77	33.1	218.5/sq mi (84.4/km^{2})
Blue Ridge †	City	Fannin	1,253	1,290	−2.9%	2.38	6.2	526.5/sq mi (203.3/km^{2})
Bluffton	Town	Clay	113	103	+9.7%	1.61	4.2	70.2/sq mi (27.1/km^{2})
Blythe	City	Burke, Richmond	744	721	+3.2%	2.82	7.3	263.8/sq mi (101.9/km^{2})
Bogart	Town	Clarke, Oconee	1,326	1,034	+28.2%	2.37	6.1	559.5/sq mi (216.0/km^{2})
Boston	City	Thomas	1,207	1,315	−8.2%	2.25	5.8	536.4/sq mi (207.1/km^{2})
Bostwick	Town	Morgan	378	365	+3.6%	3.12	8.1	121.2/sq mi (46.8/km^{2})
Bowdon	City	Carroll	2,161	2,040	+5.9%	3.40	8.8	635.6/sq mi (245.4/km^{2})
Bowersville	Town	Hart	444	365	+21.6%	3.08	8.0	144.2/sq mi (55.7/km^{2})
Bowman	City	Elbert	872	862	+1.2%	3.12	8.1	279.5/sq mi (107.9/km^{2})
Braselton	Town	Barrow, Gwinnett, Hall, Jackson	13,403	7,511	+78.4%	12.41	32.1	1,080.0/sq mi (417.0/km^{2})
Braswell	City	Paulding, Polk	355	379	−6.3%	3.15	8.2	112.7/sq mi (43.5/km^{2})
Bremen	City	Carroll, Haralson	7,185	6,227	+15.4%	10.49	27.2	684.9/sq mi (264.5/km^{2})
Brinson	Town	Decatur	217	215	+0.9%	2.04	5.3	106.4/sq mi (41.1/km^{2})
Bronwood	Town	Terrell	334	225	+48.4%	0.79	2.0	422.8/sq mi (163.2/km^{2})
Brookhaven (Note: City of Brookhaven officially incorporated December 17, 2012 and is thus not represented in the 2010 census, but population estimate is given.)	City	Dekalb	55,161	49,312	+11.9%	11.73	30.4	4,702.6/sq mi (1,815.7/km^{2})
Brooklet	City	Bulloch	1,704	1,395	+22.2%	3.29	8.5	517.9/sq mi (200.0/km^{2})
Brooks	Town	Fayette	568	524	+8.4%	4.29	11.1	132.4/sq mi (51.1/km^{2})
Broxton	City	Coffee	1,060	1,189	−10.8%	3.24	8.4	327.2/sq mi (126.3/km^{2})
Brunswick †	City	Glynn	15,210	15,383	−1.1%	17.07	44.2	891.0/sq mi (344.0/km^{2})
Buchanan †	City	Haralson	938	1,104	−15.0%	1.48	3.8	633.8/sq mi (244.7/km^{2})
Buckhead	Town	Morgan	194	171	+13.5%	0.79	2.0	245.6/sq mi (94.8/km^{2})
Buena Vista †	City	Marion	1,585	2,173	−27.1%	3.24	8.4	489.2/sq mi (188.9/km^{2})
Buford	City	Gwinnett, Hall	17,144	12,225	+40.2%	17.01	44.1	1,007.9/sq mi (389.1/km^{2})
Butler †	City	Taylor	1,881	1,972	−4.6%	3.25	8.4	578.8/sq mi (223.5/km^{2})
Byromville	Town	Dooly	422	546	−22.7%	0.36	0.93	1,172.2/sq mi (452.6/km^{2})
Byron	City	Houston, Peach	5,702	4,512	+26.4%	8.63	22.4	660.7/sq mi (255.1/km^{2})
Cadwell	Town	Laurens	381	528	−27.8%	1.25	3.2	304.8/sq mi (117.7/km^{2})
Cairo †	City	Grady	10,179	9,607	+6.0%	9.69	25.1	1,050.5/sq mi (405.6/km^{2})
Calhoun †	City	Gordon	16,949	15,650	+8.3%	14.93	38.7	1,135.2/sq mi (438.3/km^{2})
Camak	Town	Warren	141	138	+2.2%	0.79	2.0	178.5/sq mi (68.9/km^{2})
Camilla †	City	Mitchell	5,187	5,360	−3.2%	6.21	16.1	835.3/sq mi (322.5/km^{2})
Canon	City	Franklin, Hart	643	804	−20.0%	3.12	8.1	206.1/sq mi (79.6/km^{2})
Canton †	City	Cherokee	32,973	22,958	+43.6%	18.59	48.1	1,773.7/sq mi (684.8/km^{2})
Carl	Town	Barrow	209	255	−18.0%	1.08	2.8	193.5/sq mi (74.7/km^{2})
Carlton	City	Madison	263	260	+1.2%	1.01	2.6	260.4/sq mi (100.5/km^{2})
Carnesville †	City	Franklin	713	577	+23.6%	2.62	6.8	272.1/sq mi (105.1/km^{2})
Carrollton †	City	Carroll	26,738	24,388	+9.6%	22.29	57.7	1,199.6/sq mi (463.1/km^{2})
Cartersville †	City	Bartow	23,187	19,731	+17.5%	29.15	75.5	795.4/sq mi (307.1/km^{2})
Cave Spring	City	Floyd	1,174	1,200	−2.2%	4.05	10.5	289.9/sq mi (111.9/km^{2})
Cecil	Town	Cook	284	286	−0.7%	0.96	2.5	295.8/sq mi (114.2/km^{2})
Cedartown †	City	Polk	10,190	9,750	+4.5%	8.69	22.5	1,172.6/sq mi (452.7/km^{2})
Centerville	City	Houston	8,228	7,148	+15.1%	3.94	10.2	2,088.3/sq mi (806.3/km^{2})
Centralhatchee	Town	Heard	348	408	−14.7%	3.28	8.5	106.1/sq mi (41.0/km^{2})
Chamblee	City	DeKalb	30,164	9,892	+204.9%	3.18	8.2	9,485.5/sq mi (3,662.4/km^{2})
Chatsworth †	City	Murray	4,299	3,531	+21.8%	5.32	13.8	808.1/sq mi (312.0/km^{2})
Chattahoochee Hills	City	Fulton	2,950	2,378	+24.1%	50.18	130.0	58.8/sq mi (22.7/km^{2})
Chauncey	City	Dodge	289	342	−15.5%	1.73	4.5	167.1/sq mi (64.5/km^{2})
Chester	Town	Dodge	525	1,596	−67.1%	0.87	2.3	603.4/sq mi (233.0/km^{2})
Chickamauga	City	Walker	2,917	3,101	−5.9%	2.57	6.7	1,135.0/sq mi (438.2/km^{2})
Clarkesville †	City	Habersham	1,911	1,733	+10.3%	2.46	6.4	776.8/sq mi (299.9/km^{2})
Clarkston	City	DeKalb	14,756	7,554	+95.3%	1.09	2.8	13,537.6/sq mi (5,226.9/km^{2})
Claxton †	City	Evans	2,602	2,746	−5.2%	1.74	4.5	1,495.4/sq mi (577.4/km^{2})
Clayton †	City	Rabun	2,003	2,047	−2.1%	3.27	8.5	612.5/sq mi (236.5/km^{2})
Clermont	Town	Hall	1,021	875	+16.7%	2.97	7.7	343.8/sq mi (132.7/km^{2})
Cleveland †	City	White	3,514	3,410	+3.0%	3.85	10.0	912.7/sq mi (352.4/km^{2})
Climax	City	Decatur	276	280	−1.4%	0.80	2.1	345.0/sq mi (133.2/km^{2})
Cobbtown	City	Tattnall	341	351	−2.8%	0.67	1.7	509.0/sq mi (196.5/km^{2})
Cochran †	City	Bleckley	5,026	5,150	−2.4%	4.59	11.9	1,095.0/sq mi (422.8/km^{2})
Cohutta	Town	Whitfield	764	661	+15.6%	4.72	12.2	161.9/sq mi (62.5/km^{2})
Colbert	City	Madison	630	592	+6.4%	1.02	2.6	617.6/sq mi (238.5/km^{2})
College Park	City	Clayton, Fulton	13,930	13,942	−0.1%	10.07	26.1	1,383.3/sq mi (534.1/km^{2})
Collins	City	Tattnall	540	584	−7.5%	1.02	2.6	529.4/sq mi (204.4/km^{2})
Colquitt †	City	Miller	2,001	1,992	+0.5%	8.23	21.3	243.1/sq mi (93.9/km^{2})
Columbus †	Consolidated city-county	Muscogee	206,922	189,885	+9.0%	216.39	560.4	956.2/sq mi (369.2/km^{2})
Comer	City	Madison	1,512	1,126	+34.3%	3.24	8.4	466.7/sq mi (180.2/km^{2})
Commerce	City	Jackson	7,387	6,544	+12.9%	11.71	30.3	630.8/sq mi (243.6/km^{2})
Concord	Town	Pike	378	375	+0.8%	0.82	2.1	461.0/sq mi (178.0/km^{2})
Conyers †	City	Rockdale	17,305	15,195	+13.9%	11.66	30.2	1,484.1/sq mi (573.0/km^{2})
Coolidge	City	Thomas	528	525	+0.6%	0.82	2.1	643.9/sq mi (248.6/km^{2})
Cordele †	City	Crisp	10,220	11,147	−8.3%	10.14	26.3	1,007.9/sq mi (389.1/km^{2})
Cornelia	City	Habersham	4,503	4,160	+8.2%	3.94	10.2	1,142.9/sq mi (441.3/km^{2})
Covington †	City	Newton	14,192	13,118	+8.2%	15.46	40.0	918.0/sq mi (354.4/km^{2})
Crawford	City	Oglethorpe	821	832	−1.3%	1.16	3.0	707.8/sq mi (273.3/km^{2})
Crawfordville †	City	Taliaferro	479	534	−10.3%	3.12	8.1	153.5/sq mi (59.3/km^{2})
Culloden	City	Monroe	200	175	+14.3%	0.78	2.0	256.4/sq mi (99.0/km^{2})
Cumming †	City	Forsyth	7,318	5,430	+34.8%	6.09	15.8	1,201.6/sq mi (464.0/km^{2})
Cusseta †	Consolidated city-county	Chattahoochee	9,565	11,267	−15.1%	248.74	644.2	38.5/sq mi (14.8/km^{2})
Cuthbert †	City	Randolph	3,143	3,873	−18.8%	3.05	7.9	1,030.5/sq mi (397.9/km^{2})
Dacula	City	Gwinnett	6,882	4,442	+54.9%	4.96	12.8	1,387.5/sq mi (535.7/km^{2})
Dahlonega †	City	Lumpkin	7,537	5,242	+43.8%	8.59	22.2	877.4/sq mi (338.8/km^{2})
Daisy	City	Evans	159	129	+23.3%	0.87	2.3	182.8/sq mi (70.6/km^{2})
Dallas †	City	Paulding	14,042	11,544	+21.6%	7.06	18.3	1,989.0/sq mi (767.9/km^{2})
Dalton †	City	Whitfield	34,417	33,128	+3.9%	20.54	53.2	1,675.6/sq mi (647.0/km^{2})
Damascus	City	Early	212	254	−16.5%	1.76	4.6	120.5/sq mi (46.5/km^{2})
Danielsville †	City	Madison	654	560	+16.8%	1.46	3.8	447.9/sq mi (173.0/km^{2})
Danville	Town	Twiggs, Wilkinson	165	238	−30.7%	0.79	2.0	208.9/sq mi (80.6/km^{2})
Darien †	City	McIntosh	1,460	1,975	−26.1%	20.98	54.3	69.6/sq mi (26.9/km^{2})
Dasher	Town	Lowndes	890	912	−2.4%	4.54	11.8	196.0/sq mi (75.7/km^{2})
Davisboro	City	Washington	1,832	2,010	−8.9%	3.05	7.9	600.7/sq mi (231.9/km^{2})
Dawson †	City	Terrell	4,414	4,540	−2.8%	3.75	9.7	1,177.1/sq mi (454.5/km^{2})
Dawsonville †	City	Dawson	3,720	2,536	+46.7%	8.19	21.2	454.2/sq mi (175.4/km^{2})
Dearing	Town	McDuffie	529	549	−3.6%	0.82	2.1	645.1/sq mi (249.1/km^{2})
Decatur †	City	DeKalb	24,928	19,335	+28.9%	4.27	11.1	5,837.9/sq mi (2,254.0/km^{2})
Deepstep	Town	Washington	117	131	−10.7%	0.81	2.1	144.4/sq mi (55.8/km^{2})
Demorest	City	Habersham	2,022	1,823	+10.9%	2.24	5.8	902.7/sq mi (348.5/km^{2})
Denton	City	Jeff Davis	250	269	−7.1%	1.52	3.9	164.5/sq mi (63.5/km^{2})
De Soto	City	Sumter	124	195	−36.4%	0.82	2.1	151.2/sq mi (58.4/km^{2})
Dexter	Town	Laurens	655	575	+13.9%	0.77	2.0	850.6/sq mi (328.4/km^{2})
Dillard	City	Rabun	337	339	−0.6%	1.75	4.5	192.6/sq mi (74.4/km^{2})
Doerun	City	Colquitt	738	774	−4.7%	1.25	3.2	590.4/sq mi (228.0/km^{2})
Donalsonville †	City	Seminole	2,833	2,650	+6.9%	3.97	10.3	713.6/sq mi (275.5/km^{2})
Dooling	Town	Dooly	68	154	−55.8%	0.46	1.2	147.8/sq mi (57.1/km^{2})
Doraville	City	DeKalb	10,623	8,330	+27.5%	3.58	9.3	2,967.3/sq mi (1,145.7/km^{2})
Douglas †	City	Coffee	11,722	11,589	+1.1%	13.39	34.7	875.4/sq mi (338.0/km^{2})
Douglasville †	City	Douglas	34,650	30,961	+11.9%	22.46	58.2	1,542.7/sq mi (595.7/km^{2})
Dublin †	City	Laurens	16,074	16,201	−0.8%	15.49	40.1	1,037.7/sq mi (400.7/km^{2})
Dudley	City	Laurens	593	571	+3.9%	3.41	8.8	173.9/sq mi (67.1/km^{2})
Duluth	City	Gwinnett	31,873	26,600	+19.8%	9.99	25.9	3,190.5/sq mi (1,231.9/km^{2})
Dunwoody	City	DeKalb	51,683	46,267	+11.7%	12.94	33.5	3,994.0/sq mi (1,542.1/km^{2})
Du Pont	Town	Clinch	134	120	+11.7%	0.78	2.0	171.8/sq mi (66.3/km^{2})
East Dublin	City	Laurens	2,492	2,441	+2.1%	3.95	10.2	630.9/sq mi (243.6/km^{2})
East Ellijay	City	Gilmer	650	546	+19.0%	3.40	8.8	191.2/sq mi (73.8/km^{2})
Eastman †	City	Dodge	5,658	4,962	+14.0%	5.42	14.0	1,043.9/sq mi (403.1/km^{2})
East Point	City	Fulton	38,358	33,712	+13.8%	14.67	38.0	2,614.7/sq mi (1,009.6/km^{2})
Eatonton †	City	Putnam	6,480	6,764	−4.2%	20.51	53.1	315.9/sq mi (122.0/km^{2})
Echols County (Note: Echols County consolidated government, coextensive with Echols County, formed from the consolidation of Statenville and Echols County in 2008)	Unified government	Echols County	3,697	4,034	−8.4%	414.89	1,074.6	8.9/sq mi (3.4/km^{2})
Edge Hill	City	Glascock	22	24	−8.3%	0.18	0.47	122.2/sq mi (47.2/km^{2})
Edison	City	Calhoun	1,230	1,531	−19.7%	2.34	6.1	525.6/sq mi (203.0/km^{2})
Elberton †	City	Elbert	4,640	4,653	−0.3%	4.75	12.3	976.8/sq mi (377.2/km^{2})
Ellaville †	City	Schley	1,595	1,812	−12.0%	3.16	8.2	504.7/sq mi (194.9/km^{2})
Ellenton	Town	Colquitt	210	281	−25.3%	0.79	2.0	265.8/sq mi (102.6/km^{2})
Ellijay †	City	Gilmer	1,862	1,619	+15.0%	3.54	9.2	526.0/sq mi (203.1/km^{2})
Emerson	City	Bartow	1,415	1,470	−3.7%	7.30	18.9	193.8/sq mi (74.8/km^{2})
Enigma	Town	Berrien	1,058	1,278	−17.2%	3.25	8.4	325.5/sq mi (125.7/km^{2})
Ephesus	City	Heard	471	327	+44.0%	3.02	7.8	156.0/sq mi (60.2/km^{2})
Eton	Town	Murray	824	910	−9.5%	1.21	3.1	681.0/sq mi (262.9/km^{2})
Euharlee	City	Bartow	4,268	4,136	+3.2%	5.27	13.6	809.9/sq mi (312.7/km^{2})
Fairburn	City	Fulton	16,483	12,950	+27.3%	16.85	43.6	978.2/sq mi (377.7/km^{2})
Fairmount	City	Gordon	772	720	+7.2%	1.79	4.6	431.3/sq mi (166.5/km^{2})
Fargo	City	Clinch	250	321	−22.1%	2.74	7.1	91.2/sq mi (35.2/km^{2})
Fayetteville †	City	Fayette	18,957	15,945	+18.9%	10.89	28.2	1,740.8/sq mi (672.1/km^{2})
Fitzgerald †	City	Ben Hill, Irwin	9,006	9,053	−0.5%	8.86	22.9	1,016.5/sq mi (392.5/km^{2})
Flemington	City	Liberty	825	743	+11.0%	4.57	11.8	180.5/sq mi (69.7/km^{2})
Flovilla	City	Butts	643	653	−1.5%	1.96	5.1	328.1/sq mi (126.7/km^{2})
Flowery Branch	City	Hall	9,391	5,679	+65.4%	6.32	16.4	1,485.9/sq mi (573.7/km^{2})
Folkston †	City	Charlton	4,464	2,502	+78.4%	4.19	10.9	1,065.4/sq mi (411.4/km^{2})
Forest Park	City	Clayton	19,932	18,468	+7.9%	9.28	24.0	2,147.8/sq mi (829.3/km^{2})
Forsyth †	City	Monroe	4,384	3,788	+15.7%	5.89	15.3	744.3/sq mi (287.4/km^{2})
Fort Gaines †	City	Clay	995	1,107	−10.1%	4.78	12.4	208.2/sq mi (80.4/km^{2})
Fort Oglethorpe	City	Catoosa, Walker	10,423	9,263	+12.5%	13.89	36.0	750.4/sq mi (289.7/km^{2})
Fort Valley †	City	Peach	8,780	9,815	−10.5%	7.49	19.4	1,172.2/sq mi (452.6/km^{2})
Franklin †	City	Heard	950	993	−4.3%	3.34	8.7	284.4/sq mi (109.8/km^{2})
Franklin Springs	City	Franklin	1,155	952	+21.3%	2.18	5.6	529.8/sq mi (204.6/km^{2})
Funston	Town	Colquitt	402	449	−10.5%	1.14	3.0	352.6/sq mi (136.2/km^{2})
Gainesville †	City	Hall	42,296	33,804	+25.1%	31.93	82.7	1,324.6/sq mi (511.4/km^{2})
Garden City	City	Chatham	10,289	8,778	+17.2%	13.70	35.5	751.0/sq mi (290.0/km^{2})
Garfield	City	Emanuel	257	201	+27.9%	0.79	2.0	325.3/sq mi (125.6/km^{2})
Gay	Town	Meriwether	110	89	+23.6%	0.86	2.2	127.9/sq mi (49.4/km^{2})
Geneva	Town	Talbot	75	105	−28.6%	0.79	2.0	94.9/sq mi (36.7/km^{2})
Georgetown †	Consolidated city-county	Quitman	2,235	2,513	−11.1%	151.24	391.7	14.8/sq mi (5.7/km^{2})
Gibson †	City	Glascock	630	663	−5.0%	1.02	2.6	617.6/sq mi (238.5/km^{2})
Gillsville	City	Banks, Hall	306	235	+30.2%	1.13	2.9	270.8/sq mi (104.6/km^{2})
Girard	Town	Burke	184	156	+17.9%	3.16	8.2	58.2/sq mi (22.5/km^{2})
Glennville	City	Tattnall	3,834	3,569	+7.4%	6.55	17.0	585.3/sq mi (226.0/km^{2})
Glenwood	City	Wheeler	850	747	+13.8%	3.13	8.1	271.6/sq mi (104.9/km^{2})
Good Hope	Town	Walton	339	274	+23.7%	1.84	4.8	184.2/sq mi (71.1/km^{2})
Gordon	City	Wilkinson	1,783	2,017	−11.6%	5.38	13.9	331.4/sq mi (128.0/km^{2})
Graham	City	Appling	263	291	−9.6%	1.74	4.5	151.1/sq mi (58.4/km^{2})
Grantville	City	Coweta	3,103	3,041	+2.0%	5.58	14.5	556.1/sq mi (214.7/km^{2})
Gray †	City	Jones	3,436	3,276	+4.9%	3.88	10.0	885.6/sq mi (341.9/km^{2})
Grayson	City	Gwinnett	4,730	2,666	+77.4%	2.47	6.4	1,915.0/sq mi (739.4/km^{2})
Greensboro †	City	Greene	3,648	3,359	+8.6%	6.73	17.4	542.1/sq mi (209.3/km^{2})
Greenville †	City	Meriwether	794	876	−9.4%	2.34	6.1	339.3/sq mi (131.0/km^{2})
Griffin †	City	Spalding	23,478	23,643	−0.7%	13.92	36.1	1,701.0/sq mi (656.8/km^{2})
Grovetown	City	Columbia	15,577	11,216	+38.9%	4.82	12.5	3,231.7/sq mi (1,247.8/km^{2})
Gumbranch	City	Liberty	235	264	−11.0%	0.80	2.1	293.8/sq mi (113.4/km^{2})
Guyton	City	Effingham	2,289	1,684	+35.9%	3.20	8.3	715.3/sq mi (276.2/km^{2})
Hagan	City	Evans	959	996	−3.7%	2.04	5.3	470.1/sq mi (181.5/km^{2})
Hahira	City	Lowndes	3,384	2,737	+23.6%	2.48	6.4	1,364.5/sq mi (526.8/km^{2})
Hamilton †	City	Harris	1,680	1,016	+65.4%	3.31	8.6	507.6/sq mi (196.0/km^{2})
Hampton	City	Henry	8,368	6,987	+19.8%	5.61	14.5	1,491.6/sq mi (575.9/km^{2})
Hapeville	City	Fulton	6,553	6,373	+2.8%	2.41	6.2	2,719.1/sq mi (1,049.8/km^{2})
Haralson	Town	Coweta, Meriwether	172	166	+3.6%	0.80	2.1	215.0/sq mi (83.0/km^{2})
Harlem	City	Columbia	3,571	2,666	+33.9%	4.52	11.7	790.0/sq mi (305.0/km^{2})
Harrison	Town	Washington	339	489	−30.7%	1.71	4.4	198.2/sq mi (76.5/km^{2})
Hartwell †	City	Hart	4,470	4,469	0.0%	5.09	13.2	878.2/sq mi (339.1/km^{2})
Hawkinsville †	City	Pulaski	3,980	4,589	−13.3%	5.04	13.1	789.7/sq mi (304.9/km^{2})
Hazlehurst †	City	Jeff Davis	4,088	4,226	−3.3%	4.73	12.3	864.3/sq mi (333.7/km^{2})
Helen	City	White	531	510	+4.1%	2.17	5.6	244.7/sq mi (94.5/km^{2})
Hephzibah	City	Richmond	3,830	4,011	−4.5%	19.31	50.0	198.3/sq mi (76.6/km^{2})
Hiawassee †	Town	Towns	981	880	+11.5%	1.66	4.3	591.0/sq mi (228.2/km^{2})
Higgston	Town	Montgomery	314	323	−2.8%	3.15	8.2	99.7/sq mi (38.5/km^{2})
Hiltonia	City	Screven	310	342	−9.4%	1.72	4.5	180.2/sq mi (69.6/km^{2})
Hinesville †	City	Liberty	34,891	33,437	+4.3%	20.37	52.8	1,712.9/sq mi (661.3/km^{2})
Hiram	City	Paulding	4,929	3,546	+39.0%	3.87	10.0	1,273.6/sq mi (491.8/km^{2})
Hoboken	City	Brantley	480	528	−9.1%	3.43	8.9	139.9/sq mi (54.0/km^{2})
Hogansville	City	Troup	3,267	3,060	+6.8%	6.88	17.8	474.9/sq mi (183.3/km^{2})
Holly Springs	City	Cherokee	16,213	9,189	+76.4%	6.57	17.0	2,467.7/sq mi (952.8/km^{2})
Homeland	City	Charlton	886	910	−2.6%	2.47	6.4	358.7/sq mi (138.5/km^{2})
Homer †	Town	Banks	1,264	1,141	+10.8%	9.63	24.9	131.3/sq mi (50.7/km^{2})
Homerville †	City	Clinch	2,344	2,456	−4.6%	3.49	9.0	671.6/sq mi (259.3/km^{2})
Hoschton	City	Jackson	2,666	1,377	+93.6%	2.58	6.7	1,033.3/sq mi (399.0/km^{2})
Hull	City	Madison	230	198	+16.2%	0.32	0.83	718.8/sq mi (277.5/km^{2})
Ideal	City	Macon	407	499	−18.4%	1.14	3.0	357.0/sq mi (137.8/km^{2})
Ila	City	Madison	350	337	+3.9%	0.77	2.0	454.5/sq mi (175.5/km^{2})
Iron City	Town	Seminole	312	310	+0.6%	0.80	2.1	390.0/sq mi (150.6/km^{2})
Irwinton †	City	Wilkinson	531	589	−9.8%	3.14	8.1	169.1/sq mi (65.3/km^{2})
Ivey	Town	Wilkinson	1,037	981	+5.7%	2.55	6.6	406.7/sq mi (157.0/km^{2})
Jackson †	City	Butts	5,557	5,045	+10.1%	6.23	16.1	892.0/sq mi (344.4/km^{2})
Jacksonville	Town	Telfair	111	140	−20.7%	1.09	2.8	101.8/sq mi (39.3/km^{2})
Jakin	City	Early	131	155	−15.5%	1.24	3.2	105.6/sq mi (40.8/km^{2})
Jasper †	City	Pickens	4,084	3,684	+10.9%	8.56	22.2	477.1/sq mi (184.2/km^{2})
Jefferson	City	Jackson	13,233	9,432	+40.3%	21.67	56.1	610.7/sq mi (235.8/km^{2})
Jeffersonville †	City	Twiggs	977	1,035	−5.6%	3.66	9.5	266.9/sq mi (103.1/km^{2})
Jenkinsburg	City	Butts	391	370	+5.7%	1.24	3.2	315.3/sq mi (121.7/km^{2})
Jersey	Town	Walton	146	137	+6.6%	0.78	2.0	187.2/sq mi (72.3/km^{2})
Jesup †	City	Wayne	9,809	10,214	−4.0%	16.41	42.5	597.7/sq mi (230.8/km^{2})
Johns Creek (Note: City of Johns Creek officially incorporated December 1, 2006.)	City	Fulton	82,453	76,728	+7.5%	30.73	79.6	2,683.1/sq mi (1,036.0/km^{2})
Jonesboro †	City	Clayton	4,235	4,724	−10.4%	2.50	6.5	1,694.0/sq mi (654.1/km^{2})
Junction City	Town	Talbot	138	177	−22.0%	2.35	6.1	58.7/sq mi (22.7/km^{2})
Kennesaw	City	Cobb	33,036	29,783	+10.9%	9.44	24.4	3,499.6/sq mi (1,351.2/km^{2})
Keysville	City	Burke, Jefferson	300	332	−9.6%	1.05	2.7	285.7/sq mi (110.3/km^{2})
Kingsland	City	Camden	18,337	15,946	+15.0%	42.72	110.6	429.2/sq mi (165.7/km^{2})
Kingston	City	Bartow	722	637	+13.3%	1.26	3.3	573.0/sq mi (221.2/km^{2})
Kite	Town	Johnson	160	241	−33.6%	0.81	2.1	197.5/sq mi (76.3/km^{2})
LaFayette †	City	Walker	6,888	7,121	−3.3%	8.17	21.2	843.1/sq mi (325.5/km^{2})
LaGrange †	City	Troup	30,858	29,588	+4.3%	39.51	102.3	781.0/sq mi (301.6/km^{2})
Lake City	City	Clayton	2,952	2,612	+13.0%	1.85	4.8	1,595.7/sq mi (616.1/km^{2})
Lakeland †	City	Lanier	2,875	3,366	−14.6%	3.09	8.0	930.4/sq mi (359.2/km^{2})
Lake Park	City	Lowndes	932	733	+27.1%	1.39	3.6	670.5/sq mi (258.9/km^{2})
Lavonia	City	Franklin, Hart	2,143	2,156	−0.6%	4.57	11.8	468.9/sq mi (181.1/km^{2})
Lawrenceville †	City	Gwinnett	30,629	28,546	+7.3%	13.39	34.7	2,287.5/sq mi (883.2/km^{2})
Leary	City	Calhoun	524	618	−15.2%	3.21	8.3	163.2/sq mi (63.0/km^{2})
Leesburg †	City	Lee	3,480	2,896	+20.2%	4.94	12.8	704.5/sq mi (272.0/km^{2})
Lenox	Town	Cook	752	873	−13.9%	1.59	4.1	473.0/sq mi (182.6/km^{2})
Leslie	City	Sumter	344	409	−15.9%	1.77	4.6	194.4/sq mi (75.0/km^{2})
Lexington †	City	Oglethorpe	203	228	−11.0%	0.55	1.4	369.1/sq mi (142.5/km^{2})
Lilburn	City	Gwinnett	14,502	11,596	+25.1%	6.32	16.4	2,294.6/sq mi (886.0/km^{2})
Lilly	City	Dooly	129	213	−39.4%	0.60	1.6	215.0/sq mi (83.0/km^{2})
Lincolnton †	City	Lincoln	1,480	1,566	−5.5%	3.51	9.1	421.7/sq mi (162.8/km^{2})
Lithonia	City	DeKalb	2,662	1,924	+38.4%	0.89	2.3	2,991.0/sq mi (1,154.8/km^{2})
Locust Grove	City	Henry	8,947	5,402	+65.6%	10.67	27.6	838.5/sq mi (323.8/km^{2})
Loganville	City	Gwinnett, Walton	14,127	10,458	+35.1%	7.34	19.0	1,924.7/sq mi (743.1/km^{2})
Lone Oak	Town	Meriwether	114	92	+23.9%	0.62	1.6	183.9/sq mi (71.0/km^{2})
Lookout Mountain	City	Walker	1,641	1,602	+2.4%	2.66	6.9	616.9/sq mi (238.2/km^{2})
Louisville †	City	Jefferson	2,381	2,493	−4.5%	3.61	9.3	659.6/sq mi (254.7/km^{2})
Lovejoy	City	Clayton	10,122	6,422	+57.6%	2.60	6.7	3,893.1/sq mi (1,503.1/km^{2})
Ludowici †	City	Long	1,590	1,703	−6.6%	2.33	6.0	682.4/sq mi (263.5/km^{2})
Lula	City	Banks, Hall	2,822	2,758	+2.3%	4.32	11.2	653.2/sq mi (252.2/km^{2})
Lumber City	City	Telfair	967	1,328	−27.2%	1.93	5.0	501.0/sq mi (193.5/km^{2})
Lumpkin †	City	Stewart	891	2,741	−67.5%	1.58	4.1	563.9/sq mi (217.7/km^{2})
Luthersville	City	Meriwether	776	874	−11.2%	3.16	8.2	245.6/sq mi (94.8/km^{2})
Lyerly	Town	Chattooga	454	540	−15.9%	0.75	1.9	605.3/sq mi (233.7/km^{2})
Lyons †	City	Toombs	4,239	4,367	−2.9%	8.20	21.2	517.0/sq mi (199.6/km^{2})
Mableton (Note: Mableton incorporated on November 8, 2022.)	City	Cobb	40,834	37,115	+10.0%	36.46	94.4	1,120.0/sq mi (432.4/km^{2})
Macon † (Note: Macon merged with Bibb County January 1, 2014 and is thus the 2010 population shown is based on that of Bibb County in 2010.)	Consolidated city-county	Bibb	157,346	155,447	+1.2%	249.76	646.9	630.0/sq mi (243.2/km^{2})
Madison †	City	Morgan	4,447	3,979	+11.8%	8.71	22.6	510.6/sq mi (197.1/km^{2})
Manassas	City	Tattnall	59	94	−37.2%	0.77	2.0	76.6/sq mi (29.6/km^{2})
Manchester	City	Meriwether, Talbot	3,584	4,230	−15.3%	8.01	20.7	447.4/sq mi (172.8/km^{2})
Mansfield	City	Newton	442	410	+7.8%	1.05	2.7	421.0/sq mi (162.5/km^{2})
Marietta †	City	Cobb	60,972	56,579	+7.8%	23.08	59.8	2,641.8/sq mi (1,020.0/km^{2})
Marshallville	City	Macon	1,048	1,448	−27.6%	3.12	8.1	335.9/sq mi (129.7/km^{2})
Martin	Town	Franklin, Stephens	336	381	−11.8%	2.51	6.5	133.9/sq mi (51.7/km^{2})
Maxeys	Town	Oglethorpe	198	224	−11.6%	2.38	6.2	83.2/sq mi (32.1/km^{2})
Maysville	Town	Banks, Jackson	1,867	1,798	+3.8%	4.26	11.0	438.3/sq mi (169.2/km^{2})
McCaysville	City	Fannin	1,149	1,056	+8.8%	1.55	4.0	741.3/sq mi (286.2/km^{2})
McDonough †	City	Henry	29,051	22,084	+31.5%	12.71	32.9	2,285.7/sq mi (882.5/km^{2})
McIntyre	Town	Wilkinson	575	650	−11.5%	5.18	13.4	111.0/sq mi (42.9/km^{2})
McRae–Helena † (Note: McRae merged with Helena January 1, 2015. The 2010 population shown is the sum of the two cities at that time.)	City	Telfair (seat), Wheeler	6,253	8,623	−27.5%	6.44	16.7	971.0/sq mi (374.9/km^{2})
Meansville	City	Pike	266	182	+46.2%	0.51	1.3	521.6/sq mi (201.4/km^{2})
Meigs	City	Mitchell, Thomas	928	1,035	−10.3%	1.56	4.0	594.9/sq mi (229.7/km^{2})
Menlo	City	Chattooga	480	474	+1.3%	0.78	2.0	615.4/sq mi (237.6/km^{2})
Metter †	City	Candler	4,004	4,130	−3.1%	7.68	19.9	521.4/sq mi (201.3/km^{2})
Midville	City	Burke	385	269	+43.1%	1.99	5.2	193.5/sq mi (74.7/km^{2})
Midway	City	Liberty	2,141	2,121	+0.9%	6.39	16.6	335.1/sq mi (129.4/km^{2})
Milan	City	Dodge, Telfair	613	700	−12.4%	3.11	8.1	197.1/sq mi (76.1/km^{2})
Milledgeville †	City	Baldwin	17,070	17,715	−3.6%	20.41	52.9	836.4/sq mi (322.9/km^{2})
Millen †	City	Jenkins	2,966	3,120	−4.9%	3.58	9.3	828.5/sq mi (319.9/km^{2})
Milner	City	Lamar	772	610	+26.6%	2.00	5.2	386.0/sq mi (149.0/km^{2})
Milton	City	Fulton	41,296	32,661	+26.4%	38.52	99.8	1,072.1/sq mi (413.9/km^{2})
Mitchell	Town	Glascock	153	199	−23.1%	1.48	3.8	103.4/sq mi (39.9/km^{2})
Molena	City	Pike	392	368	+6.5%	1.73	4.5	226.6/sq mi (87.5/km^{2})
Monroe †	City	Walton	14,756	13,234	+11.5%	15.12	39.2	975.9/sq mi (376.8/km^{2})
Montezuma	City	Macon	3,047	3,460	−11.9%	4.56	11.8	668.2/sq mi (258.0/km^{2})
Monticello †	City	Jasper	2,541	2,657	−4.4%	3.21	8.3	791.6/sq mi (305.6/km^{2})
Montrose	Town	Laurens	203	215	−5.6%	1.61	4.2	126.1/sq mi (48.7/km^{2})
Moreland	Town	Coweta	382	399	−4.3%	0.91	2.4	419.8/sq mi (162.1/km^{2})
Morgan †	City	Calhoun	1,741	1,861	−6.4%	1.31	3.4	1,329.0/sq mi (513.1/km^{2})
Morganton	City	Fannin	285	303	−5.9%	0.83	2.1	343.4/sq mi (132.6/km^{2})
Morrow	City	Clayton	6,569	6,445	+1.9%	3.38	8.8	1,943.5/sq mi (750.4/km^{2})
Morven	City	Brooks	506	565	−10.4%	1.72	4.5	294.2/sq mi (113.6/km^{2})
Moultrie †	City	Colquitt	14,638	14,268	+2.6%	16.34	42.3	895.8/sq mi (345.9/km^{2})
Mountain City	Town	Rabun	904	1,088	−16.9%	1.82	4.7	496.7/sq mi (191.8/km^{2})
Mountain Park	City	Cherokee, Fulton	583	547	+6.6%	0.47	1.2	1,240.4/sq mi (478.9/km^{2})
Mount Airy	Town	Habersham	1,391	1,284	+8.3%	2.58	6.7	539.1/sq mi (208.2/km^{2})
Mount Vernon †	City	Montgomery	1,990	2,451	−18.8%	4.06	10.5	490.1/sq mi (189.2/km^{2})
Mount Zion	City	Carroll	1,766	1,696	+4.1%	9.70	25.1	182.1/sq mi (70.3/km^{2})
Nahunta †	City	Brantley	1,013	1,053	−3.8%	2.81	7.3	360.5/sq mi (139.2/km^{2})
Nashville †	City	Berrien	4,974	4,939	+0.7%	4.65	12.0	1,069.7/sq mi (413.0/km^{2})
Nelson	City	Cherokee, Pickens	1,145	1,314	−12.9%	1.45	3.8	789.7/sq mi (304.9/km^{2})
Newborn	Town	Newton	676	696	−2.9%	1.59	4.1	425.2/sq mi (164.2/km^{2})
Newington	Town	Screven	290	274	+5.8%	0.81	2.1	358.0/sq mi (138.2/km^{2})
Newnan †	City	Coweta	42,549	33,039	+28.8%	18.32	47.4	2,322.5/sq mi (896.7/km^{2})
Newton	City	Baker	602	654	−8.0%	2.91	7.5	206.9/sq mi (79.9/km^{2})
Nicholls	City	Coffee	3,147	2,798	+12.5%	1.83	4.7	1,719.7/sq mi (664.0/km^{2})
Nicholson	City	Jackson	1,808	1,696	+6.6%	4.00	10.4	452.0/sq mi (174.5/km^{2})
Norcross	City	Gwinnett	17,209	9,116	+88.8%	4.64	12.0	3,708.8/sq mi (1,432.0/km^{2})
Norman Park	City	Colquitt	963	972	−0.9%	3.07	8.0	313.7/sq mi (121.1/km^{2})
North High Shoals	Town	Oconee	552	652	−15.3%	2.45	6.3	225.3/sq mi (87.0/km^{2})
Norwood	City	Warren	202	239	−15.5%	0.81	2.1	249.4/sq mi (96.3/km^{2})
Nunez	City	Emanuel	134	147	−8.8%	1.32	3.4	101.5/sq mi (39.2/km^{2})
Oak Park	Town	Emanuel	512	484	+5.8%	7.07	18.3	72.4/sq mi (28.0/km^{2})
Oakwood	City	Hall	4,822	3,970	+21.5%	5.05	13.1	954.9/sq mi (368.7/km^{2})
Ochlocknee	Town	Thomas	672	676	−0.6%	0.93	2.4	722.6/sq mi (279.0/km^{2})
Ocilla †	City	Irwin	3,498	3,414	+2.5%	2.55	6.6	1,371.8/sq mi (529.6/km^{2})
Oconee	City	Washington	197	252	−21.8%	1.30	3.4	151.5/sq mi (58.5/km^{2})
Odum	Town	Wayne	463	504	−8.1%	1.94	5.0	238.7/sq mi (92.1/km^{2})
Offerman	City	Pierce	450	441	+2.0%	3.17	8.2	142.0/sq mi (54.8/km^{2})
Oglethorpe †	City	Macon	995	1,328	−25.1%	1.99	5.2	500.0/sq mi (193.1/km^{2})
Oliver	City	Screven	210	239	−12.1%	0.93	2.4	225.8/sq mi (87.2/km^{2})
Omega	City	Colquitt, Tift	1,318	1,221	+7.9%	1.78	4.6	740.4/sq mi (285.9/km^{2})
Orchard Hill	Town	Spalding	219	209	+4.8%	0.36	0.93	608.3/sq mi (234.9/km^{2})
Oxford	City	Newton	2,308	2,134	+8.2%	2.15	5.6	1,073.5/sq mi (414.5/km^{2})
Palmetto	City	Coweta, Fulton	5,071	4,488	+13.0%	11.38	29.5	445.6/sq mi (172.0/km^{2})
Parrott	Town	Terrell	120	158	−24.1%	0.78	2.0	153.8/sq mi (59.4/km^{2})
Patterson	City	Pierce	749	730	+2.6%	2.52	6.5	297.2/sq mi (114.8/km^{2})
Pavo	City	Brooks, Thomas	622	627	−0.8%	1.76	4.6	353.4/sq mi (136.5/km^{2})
Peachtree City	City	Fayette	38,244	34,364	+11.3%	24.54	63.6	1,558.4/sq mi (601.7/km^{2})
Peachtree Corners (Note: City of Peachtree Corners officially incorporated July 1, 2012 and is thus not represented in the 2010 census, but the population estimate is given.)	City	Gwinnett	42,243	30,059	+40.5%	16.0	41	2,640.2/sq mi (1,019.4/km^{2})
Pearson †	City	Atkinson	1,821	2,117	−14.0%	3.35	8.7	543.6/sq mi (209.9/km^{2})
Pelham	City	Mitchell	3,507	3,898	−10.0%	4.06	10.5	863.8/sq mi (333.5/km^{2})
Pembroke †	City	Bryan	2,513	2,196	+14.4%	7.58	19.6	331.5/sq mi (128.0/km^{2})
Pendergrass	City	Jackson	1,692	422	+300.9%	3.00	7.8	564.0/sq mi (217.8/km^{2})
Perry †	City	Houston (seat), Peach	20,624	13,839	+49.0%	26.18	67.8	787.8/sq mi (304.2/km^{2})
Pinehurst	City	Dooly	309	455	−32.1%	1.02	2.6	401.0/sq mi (154.8/km^{2})
Pine Lake	City	DeKalb	752	730	+3.0%	0.25	0.65	3,008.0/sq mi (1,161.4/km^{2})
Pine Mountain	Town	Harris, Meriwether	1,216	1,304	−6.7%	2.88	7.5	422.2/sq mi (163.0/km^{2})
Pineview	Town	Wilcox	454	523	−13.2%	1.95	5.1	232.8/sq mi (89.9/km^{2})
Pitts	City	Wilcox	252	320	−21.3%	0.80	2.1	315.0/sq mi (121.6/km^{2})
Plains	City	Sumter	573	776	−26.2%	0.81	2.1	707.4/sq mi (273.1/km^{2})
Plainville	City	Gordon	356	313	+13.7%	0.72	1.9	494.4/sq mi (190.9/km^{2})
Pooler	City	Chatham	25,711	19,140	+34.3%	29.39	76.1	874.8/sq mi (337.8/km^{2})
Portal	Town	Bulloch	638	638	0.0%	2.11	5.5	302.4/sq mi (116.7/km^{2})
Porterdale	City	Newton	1,799	1,429	+25.9%	2.32	6.0	775.4/sq mi (299.4/km^{2})
Port Wentworth	City	Chatham	10,878	5,359	+103.0%	16.45	42.6	661.3/sq mi (255.3/km^{2})
Poulan	City	Worth	760	851	−10.7%	1.67	4.3	455.1/sq mi (175.7/km^{2})
Powder Springs	City	Cobb	16,887	13,940	+21.1%	7.17	18.6	2,355.2/sq mi (909.4/km^{2})
Pulaski	Town	Candler	211	266	−20.7%	0.80	2.1	263.8/sq mi (101.8/km^{2})
Quitman †	City	Brooks	4,064	3,850	+5.6%	4.13	10.7	984.0/sq mi (379.9/km^{2})
Ranger	Town	Gordon	107	131	−18.3%	0.82	2.1	130.5/sq mi (50.4/km^{2})
Ray City	City	Berrien	956	1,090	−12.3%	0.89	2.3	1,074.2/sq mi (414.7/km^{2})
Rayle	Town	Wilkes	158	199	−20.6%	1.02	2.6	154.9/sq mi (59.8/km^{2})
Rebecca	City	Turner	208	187	+11.2%	0.79	2.0	263.3/sq mi (101.7/km^{2})
Register	Town	Bulloch	157	175	−10.3%	0.77	2.0	203.9/sq mi (78.7/km^{2})
Reidsville †	City	Tattnall	2,515	4,944	−49.1%	7.57	19.6	332.2/sq mi (128.3/km^{2})
Remerton	City	Lowndes	1,334	1,123	+18.8%	0.20	0.52	6,670.0/sq mi (2,575.3/km^{2})
Rentz	Town	Laurens	312	295	+5.8%	1.05	2.7	297.1/sq mi (114.7/km^{2})
Resaca	Town	Gordon	1,142	544	+109.9%	2.80	7.3	407.9/sq mi (157.5/km^{2})
Rest Haven	Town	Gwinnett, Hall	45	62	−27.4%	0.35	0.91	128.6/sq mi (49.6/km^{2})
Reynolds	Town	Taylor	926	1,086	−14.7%	1.99	5.2	465.3/sq mi (179.7/km^{2})
Rhine	Town	Dodge	295	394	−25.1%	3.13	8.1	94.2/sq mi (36.4/km^{2})
Riceboro	City	Liberty	615	809	−24.0%	11.03	28.6	55.8/sq mi (21.5/km^{2})
Richland	City	Stewart	1,370	1,473	−7.0%	3.20	8.3	428.1/sq mi (165.3/km^{2})
Richmond Hill	City	Bryan	16,633	9,281	+79.2%	14.44	37.4	1,151.9/sq mi (444.7/km^{2})
Riddleville	Town	Washington	80	96	−16.7%	0.77	2.0	103.9/sq mi (40.1/km^{2})
Rincon	Town	Effingham	10,934	8,836	+23.7%	8.86	22.9	1,234.1/sq mi (476.5/km^{2})
Ringgold †	City	Catoosa	3,414	3,580	−4.6%	4.75	12.3	718.7/sq mi (277.5/km^{2})
Riverdale	City	Clayton	15,129	15,134	0.0%	4.53	11.7	3,339.7/sq mi (1,289.5/km^{2})
Roberta	City	Crawford	813	1,007	−19.3%	1.49	3.9	675.8/sq mi (260.9/km^{2})
Rochelle	City	Wilcox	1,167	1,174	−0.6%	1.91	4.9	611.0/sq mi (235.9/km^{2})
Rockmart	City	Polk	4,730	4,199	+12.6%	5.64	14.6	838.7/sq mi (323.8/km^{2})
Rocky Ford	Town	Screven	167	144	+16.0%	1.21	3.1	138.0/sq mi (53.3/km^{2})
Rome †	City	Floyd	37,713	36,303	+3.9%	30.91	80.1	1,220.1/sq mi (471.1/km^{2})
Roopville	Town	Carroll	231	218	+6.0%	0.79	2.0	292.4/sq mi (112.9/km^{2})
Rossville	City	Walker	3,980	4,105	−3.0%	1.81	4.7	2,198.9/sq mi (849.0/km^{2})
Roswell	City	Fulton	92,833	88,346	+5.1%	40.72	105.5	2,279.8/sq mi (880.2/km^{2})
Royston	City	Franklin, Hart, Madison	2,649	2,582	+2.6%	3.38	8.8	783.7/sq mi (302.6/km^{2})
Rutledge	City	Morgan	871	781	+11.5%	3.27	8.5	266.4/sq mi (102.8/km^{2})
St. Marys	City	Camden	18,256	17,121	+6.6%	22.51	58.3	811.0/sq mi (313.1/km^{2})
Sale City	Town	Mitchell	354	380	−6.8%	1.83	4.7	193.4/sq mi (74.7/km^{2})
Sandersville †	City	Washington	5,813	5,912	−1.7%	12.72	32.9	457.0/sq mi (176.4/km^{2})
Sandy Springs	City	Fulton	108,080	93,853	+15.2%	37.64	97.5	2,871.4/sq mi (1,108.7/km^{2})
Santa Claus	City	Toombs	204	165	+23.6%	0.18	0.47	1,133.3/sq mi (437.6/km^{2})
Sardis	City	Burke	995	999	−0.4%	1.55	4.0	641.9/sq mi (247.9/km^{2})
Sasser	Town	Terrell	287	279	+2.9%	0.78	2.0	367.9/sq mi (142.1/km^{2})
Savannah †	City	Chatham	147,780	136,286	+8.4%	103.15	267.2	1,432.7/sq mi (553.2/km^{2})
Scotland	City	Telfair, Wheeler	173	366	−52.7%	1.39	3.6	124.5/sq mi (48.1/km^{2})
Screven	City	Wayne	769	766	+0.4%	2.15	5.6	357.7/sq mi (138.1/km^{2})
Senoia	City	Coweta	5,016	3,307	+51.7%	5.35	13.9	937.6/sq mi (362.0/km^{2})
Shady Dale	Town	Jasper	252	249	+1.2%	0.88	2.3	286.4/sq mi (110.6/km^{2})
Sharon	City	Taliaferro	104	140	−25.7%	0.78	2.0	133.3/sq mi (51.5/km^{2})
Sharpsburg	Town	Coweta	327	341	−4.1%	0.59	1.5	554.2/sq mi (214.0/km^{2})
Shellman	City	Randolph	861	1,083	−20.5%	3.23	8.4	266.6/sq mi (102.9/km^{2})
Shiloh	City	Harris	402	445	−9.7%	2.25	5.8	178.7/sq mi (69.0/km^{2})
Siloam	Town	Greene	194	282	−31.2%	1.21	3.1	160.3/sq mi (61.9/km^{2})
Sky Valley	City	Rabun	593	272	+118.0%	3.04	7.9	195.1/sq mi (75.3/km^{2})
Smithville	City	Lee	593	575	+3.1%	2.54	6.6	233.5/sq mi (90.1/km^{2})
Smyrna	City	Cobb	55,663	51,271	+8.6%	15.35	39.8	3,626.3/sq mi (1,400.1/km^{2})
Snellville	City	Gwinnett	20,573	18,242	+12.8%	10.45	27.1	1,968.7/sq mi (760.1/km^{2})
Social Circle	City	Newton, Walton	5,974	4,262	+40.2%	15.92	41.2	375.3/sq mi (144.9/km^{2})
Soperton †	City	Treutlen	2,889	3,115	−7.3%	4.40	11.4	656.6/sq mi (253.5/km^{2})
South Fulton	City	Fulton	107,436	0	NA	85.216	220.71	1,260.7/sq mi (486.8/km^{2})
Sparks	Town	Cook	2,043	2,052	−0.4%	3.91	10.1	522.5/sq mi (201.7/km^{2})
Sparta †	City	Hancock	1,357	1,400	−3.1%	1.82	4.7	745.6/sq mi (287.9/km^{2})
Springfield †	City	Effingham	2,703	2,852	−5.2%	2.76	7.1	979.3/sq mi (378.1/km^{2})
Stapleton	City	Jefferson	402	438	−8.2%	1.74	4.5	231.0/sq mi (89.2/km^{2})
Statesboro †	City	Bulloch	33,438	28,422	+17.6%	13.50	35.0	2,476.9/sq mi (956.3/km^{2})
Statham	City	Barrow	2,813	2,408	+16.8%	3.52	9.1	799.1/sq mi (308.6/km^{2})
Stillmore	City	Emanuel	439	532	−17.5%	3.09	8.0	142.1/sq mi (54.9/km^{2})
Stockbridge	City	Henry	28,973	25,636	+13.0%	13.31	34.5	2,176.8/sq mi (840.5/km^{2})
Stone Mountain	City	DeKalb	6,703	5,802	+15.5%	1.70	4.4	3,942.9/sq mi (1,522.4/km^{2})
Stonecrest	City	DeKalb	59,194	0	NA	37.403	96.87	1,582.6/sq mi (611.0/km^{2})
Sugar Hill	City	Gwinnett	25,076	18,522	+35.4%	10.60	27.5	2,365.7/sq mi (913.4/km^{2})
Summertown	City	Emanuel	121	160	−24.4%	0.79	2.0	153.2/sq mi (59.1/km^{2})
Summerville †	City	Chattooga	4,435	4,534	−2.2%	4.01	10.4	1,106.0/sq mi (427.0/km^{2})
Sumner	Town	Worth	445	427	+4.2%	1.81	4.7	245.9/sq mi (94.9/km^{2})
Sunny Side	City	Spalding	203	134	+51.5%	0.20	0.52	1,015.0/sq mi (391.9/km^{2})
Surrency	Town	Appling	194	201	−3.5%	0.77	2.0	251.9/sq mi (97.3/km^{2})
Suwanee	City	Gwinnett	20,786	15,355	+35.4%	10.88	28.2	1,910.5/sq mi (737.6/km^{2})
Swainsboro †	City	Emanuel	7,425	7,277	+2.0%	12.58	32.6	590.2/sq mi (227.9/km^{2})
Sycamore	City	Turner	692	711	−2.7%	0.99	2.6	699.0/sq mi (269.9/km^{2})
Sylvania †	City	Screven	2,634	2,956	−10.9%	5.04	13.1	522.6/sq mi (201.8/km^{2})
Sylvester †	City	Worth	5,644	6,188	−8.8%	6.17	16.0	914.7/sq mi (353.2/km^{2})
Talbotton †	City	Talbot	742	970	−23.5%	3.10	8.0	239.4/sq mi (92.4/km^{2})
Talking Rock	Town	Pickens	91	64	+42.2%	1.49	3.9	61.1/sq mi (23.6/km^{2})
Tallapoosa	City	Haralson	3,227	3,170	+1.8%	10.03	26.0	321.7/sq mi (124.2/km^{2})
Tallulah Falls	Town	Habersham, Rabun	199	168	+18.5%	8.08	20.9	24.6/sq mi (9.5/km^{2})
Talmo	Town	Jackson	257	180	+42.8%	2.09	5.4	123.0/sq mi (47.5/km^{2})
Tarrytown	Town	Montgomery	66	87	−24.1%	0.86	2.2	76.7/sq mi (29.6/km^{2})
Taylorsville	Town	Bartow, Polk	252	210	+20.0%	1.49	3.9	169.1/sq mi (65.3/km^{2})
Temple	City	Carroll, Haralson	5,089	4,228	+20.4%	6.80	17.6	748.4/sq mi (289.0/km^{2})
Tennille	City	Washington	1,469	1,539	−4.5%	1.77	4.6	829.9/sq mi (320.4/km^{2})
Thomaston †	City	Upson	9,816	9,170	+7.0%	9.53	24.7	1,030.0/sq mi (397.7/km^{2})
Thomasville †	City	Thomas	18,881	18,413	+2.5%	14.95	38.7	1,262.9/sq mi (487.6/km^{2})
Thomson †	City	McDuffie	6,814	6,778	+0.5%	4.39	11.4	1,552.2/sq mi (599.3/km^{2})
Thunderbolt	Town	Chatham	2,556	2,668	−4.2%	1.20	3.1	2,130.0/sq mi (822.4/km^{2})
Tifton †	City	Tift	17,045	16,350	+4.3%	12.49	32.3	1,364.7/sq mi (526.9/km^{2})
Tiger	Town	Rabun	422	408	+3.4%	0.83	2.1	508.4/sq mi (196.3/km^{2})
Tignall	Town	Wilkes	485	546	−11.2%	2.75	7.1	176.4/sq mi (68.1/km^{2})
Toccoa †	City	Stephens	9,133	8,491	+7.6%	9.50	24.6	961.4/sq mi (371.2/km^{2})
Toomsboro	Town	Wilkinson	383	472	−18.9%	1.86	4.8	205.9/sq mi (79.5/km^{2})
Trenton †	City	Dade	2,195	2,301	−4.6%	3.22	8.3	681.7/sq mi (263.2/km^{2})
Trion	Town	Chattooga	1,960	1,827	+7.3%	3.83	9.9	511.7/sq mi (197.6/km^{2})
Tucker (Note: Tucker was a CDP prior to incorporation in 2016. The 2010 population of the CDP is given here.)	City	DeKalb	37,005	27,581	+34.2%	20.204	52.33	1,831.6/sq mi (707.2/km^{2})
Tunnel Hill	City	Whitfield	963	856	+12.5%	1.60	4.1	601.9/sq mi (232.4/km^{2})
Turin	Town	Coweta	347	274	+26.6%	1.61	4.2	215.5/sq mi (83.2/km^{2})
Twin City	City	Emanuel	1,642	1,742	−5.7%	3.57	9.2	459.9/sq mi (177.6/km^{2})
Tybee Island	City	Chatham	3,114	2,990	+4.1%	2.33	6.0	1,336.5/sq mi (516.0/km^{2})
Tyrone	Town	Fayette	7,658	6,879	+11.3%	12.47	32.3	614.1/sq mi (237.1/km^{2})
Ty Ty	City	Tift	641	725	−11.6%	0.78	2.0	821.8/sq mi (317.3/km^{2})
Unadilla	City	Dooly	3,118	3,796	−17.9%	6.04	15.6	516.2/sq mi (199.3/km^{2})
Union City	City	Fulton	26,738	19,456	+37.4%	19.11	49.5	1,399.2/sq mi (540.2/km^{2})
Union Point	City	Greene	1,597	1,617	−1.2%	1.89	4.9	845.0/sq mi (326.2/km^{2})
Uvalda	City	Montgomery	439	598	−26.6%	1.89	4.9	232.3/sq mi (89.7/km^{2})
Valdosta †	City	Lowndes	55,378	54,518	+1.6%	35.83	92.8	1,545.6/sq mi (596.8/km^{2})
Varnell	City	Whitfield	2,179	1,744	+24.9%	3.36	8.7	648.5/sq mi (250.4/km^{2})
Vernonburg	Town	Chatham	139	122	+13.9%	0.35	0.91	397.1/sq mi (153.3/km^{2})
Vidette	City	Burke	103	112	−8.0%	0.97	2.5	106.2/sq mi (41.0/km^{2})
Vienna †	City	Dooly	2,928	4,011	−27.0%	5.47	14.2	535.3/sq mi (206.7/km^{2})
Vidalia	City	Montgomery, Toombs	10,785	10,473	+3.0%	17.27	44.7	624.5/sq mi (241.1/km^{2})
Villa Rica	City	Carroll, Douglas	16,970	13,956	+21.6%	14.24	36.9	1,191.7/sq mi (460.1/km^{2})
Waco	City	Haralson	536	516	+3.9%	1.84	4.8	291.3/sq mi (112.5/km^{2})
Wadley	City	Jefferson	1,643	2,061	−20.3%	4.56	11.8	360.3/sq mi (139.1/km^{2})
Waleska	City	Cherokee	921	644	+43.0%	1.46	3.8	630.8/sq mi (243.6/km^{2})
Walnut Grove	Town	Walton	1,322	1,330	−0.6%	3.05	7.9	433.4/sq mi (167.4/km^{2})
Walthourville	City	Liberty	3,680	4,111	−10.5%	3.75	9.7	981.3/sq mi (378.9/km^{2})
Warm Springs	City	Meriwether	465	425	+9.4%	1.35	3.5	344.4/sq mi (133.0/km^{2})
Warner Robins	City	Houston, Peach	80,308	66,588	+20.6%	35.07	90.8	2,289.9/sq mi (884.1/km^{2})
Warrenton †	City	Warren	1,744	1,937	−10.0%	1.90	4.9	917.9/sq mi (354.4/km^{2})
Warwick	City	Worth	504	423	+19.1%	0.81	2.1	622.2/sq mi (240.2/km^{2})
Washington †	City	Wilkes	3,754	4,134	−9.2%	7.70	19.9	487.5/sq mi (188.2/km^{2})
Watkinsville †	Town	Oconee	2,896	2,832	+2.3%	3.27	8.5	885.6/sq mi (341.9/km^{2})
Waverly Hall	Town	Harris	638	735	−13.2%	3.34	8.7	191.0/sq mi (73.8/km^{2})
Waycross †	City	Ware	13,942	14,649	−4.8%	11.71	30.3	1,190.6/sq mi (459.7/km^{2})
Waynesboro †	City	Burke	5,799	5,766	+0.6%	5.42	14.0	1,069.9/sq mi (413.1/km^{2})
Webster County (Note: Webster County unified government, coextensive with Webster County, formed from the consolidation of Preston and Weston towns and Webster County in 2009)	Unified government	Webster County	2,348	2,799	−16.1%	209.12	541.6	11.2/sq mi (4.3/km^{2})
West Point	City	Harris, Troup	3,719	3,474	+7.1%	11.17	28.9	332.9/sq mi (128.6/km^{2})
Whigham	City	Grady	428	471	−9.1%	1.17	3.0	365.8/sq mi (141.2/km^{2})
White	City	Bartow	661	670	−1.3%	0.96	2.5	688.5/sq mi (265.8/km^{2})
White Plains	City	Greene	239	284	−15.8%	4.67	12.1	51.2/sq mi (19.8/km^{2})
Whitesburg	Town	Carroll	596	588	+1.4%	2.77	7.2	215.2/sq mi (83.1/km^{2})
Willacoochee	City	Atkinson	1,240	1,391	−10.9%	3.82	9.9	324.6/sq mi (125.3/km^{2})
Williamson	City	Pike	681	352	+93.5%	0.59	1.5	1,154.2/sq mi (445.7/km^{2})
Winder †	City	Barrow	18,338	14,099	+30.1%	12.41	32.1	1,477.7/sq mi (570.5/km^{2})
Winterville	City	Clarke	1,201	1,122	+7.0%	2.62	6.8	458.4/sq mi (177.0/km^{2})
Woodbine †	City	Camden	1,062	1,412	−24.8%	2.51	6.5	423.1/sq mi (163.4/km^{2})
Woodbury	City	Meriwether	908	961	−5.5%	2.03	5.3	447.3/sq mi (172.7/km^{2})
Woodland	City	Talbot	305	408	−25.2%	0.79	2.0	386.1/sq mi (149.1/km^{2})
Woodstock	City	Cherokee	35,065	23,896	+46.7%	11.16	28.9	3,142.0/sq mi (1,213.1/km^{2})
Woodville	City	Greene	264	321	−17.8%	4.89	12.7	54.0/sq mi (20.8/km^{2})
Woolsey	Town	Fayette	206	158	+30.4%	0.82	2.1	251.2/sq mi (97.0/km^{2})
Wrens	City	Jefferson	2,217	2,187	+1.4%	3.13	8.1	708.3/sq mi (273.5/km^{2})
Wrightsville †	City	Johnson	3,449	2,195	+57.1%	3.52	9.1	979.8/sq mi (378.3/km^{2})
Yatesville	Town	Upson	394	357	+10.4%	0.86	2.2	458.1/sq mi (176.9/km^{2})
Young Harris	City	Towns	1,098	899	+22.1%	1.06	2.7	1,035.8/sq mi (399.9/km^{2})
Zebulon †	City	Pike	1,225	1,174	+4.3%	4.46	11.6	274.7/sq mi (106.0/km^{2})

== See also ==
- Georgia statistical areas
- List of census-designated places in Georgia
- List of counties in Georgia (U.S. state)

== Images ==
Most populous cities and towns in Georgia by population

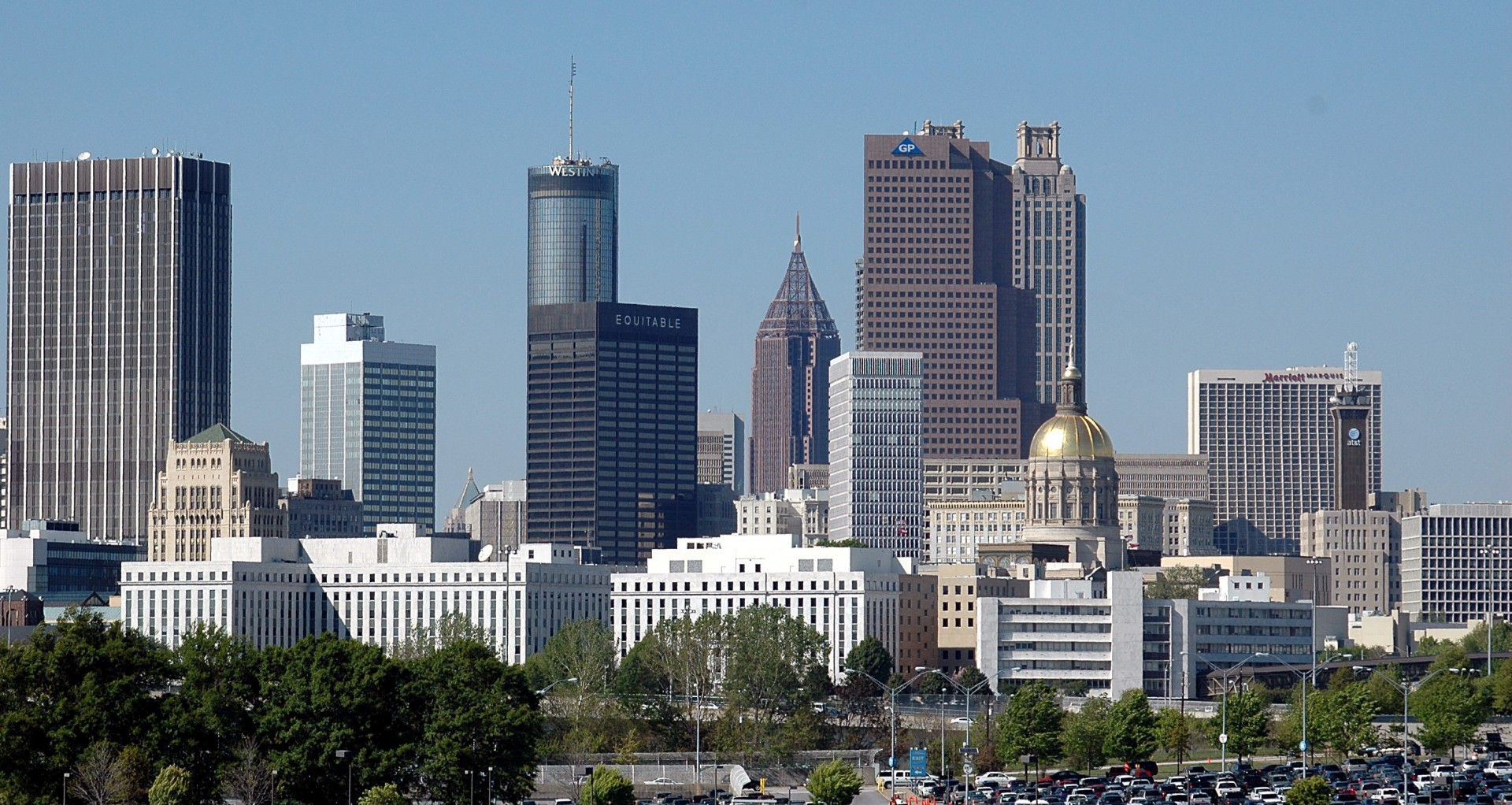
Atlanta, the state capital and most populous city in Georgia

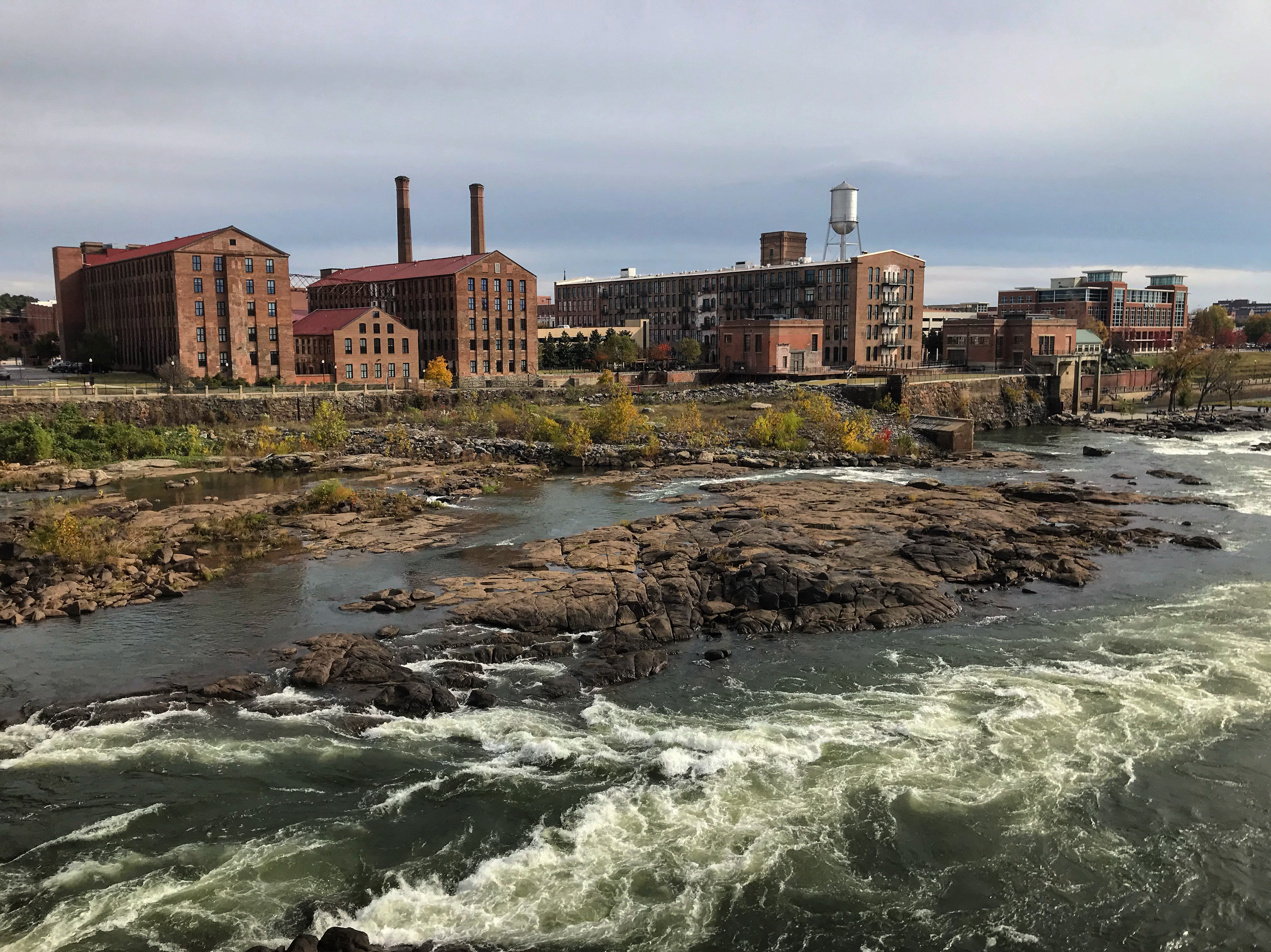
Columbus, Georgia's second-most populous city

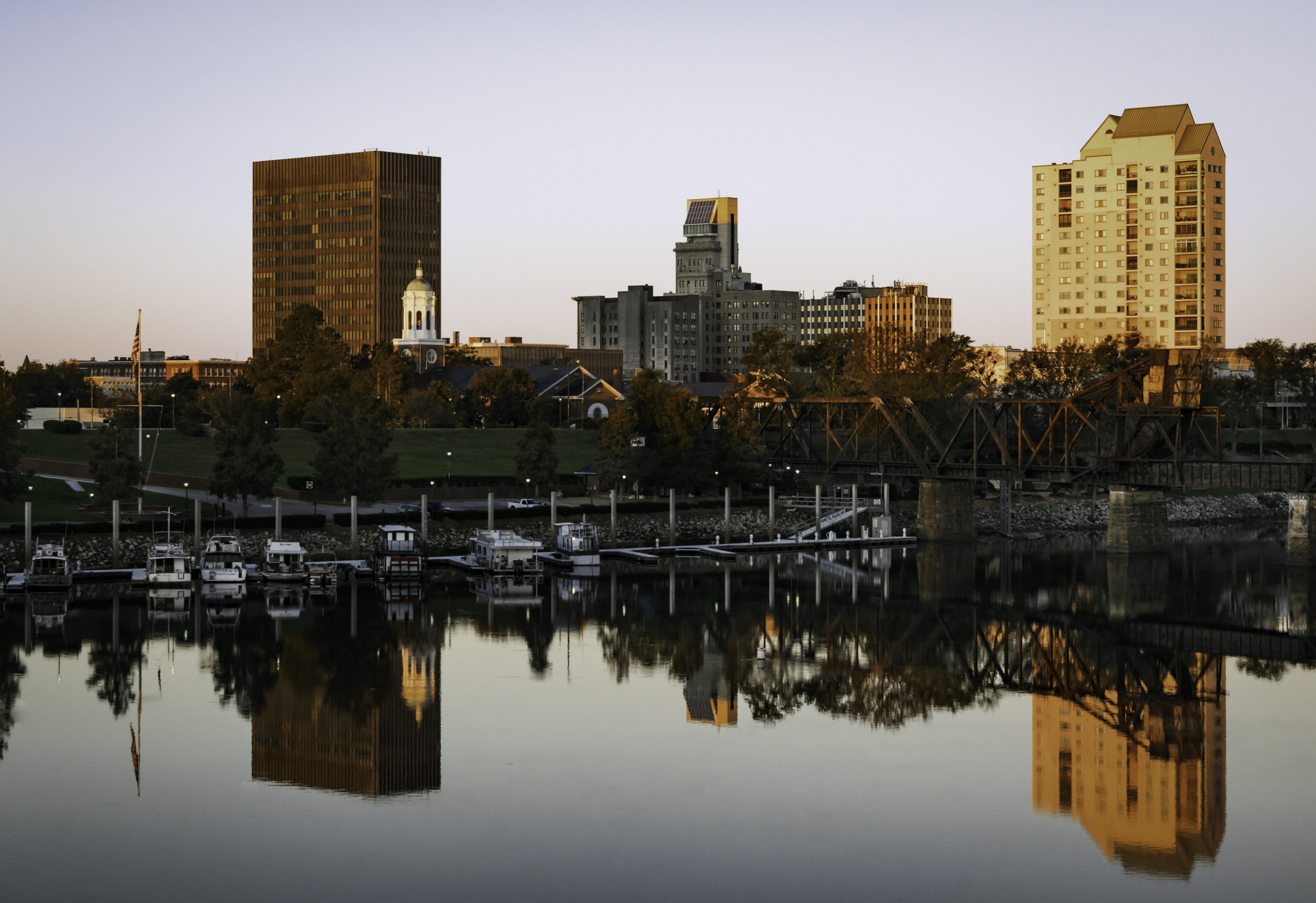
Augusta, Georgia's third-most populous city

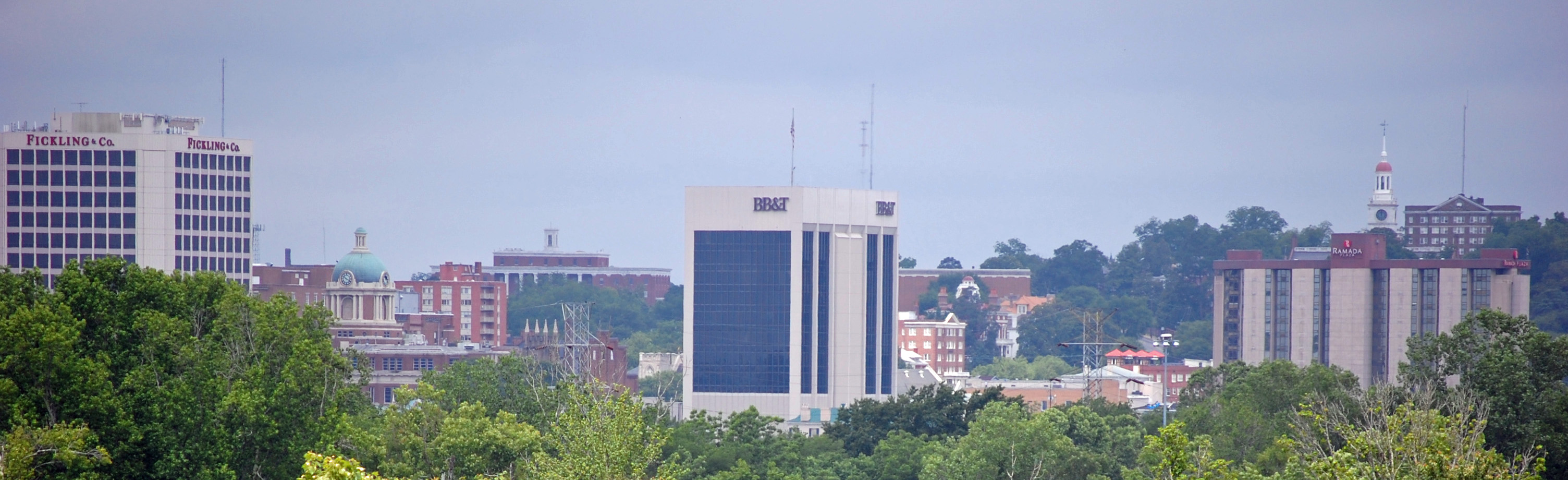
Macon, Georgia's fourth-most populous city

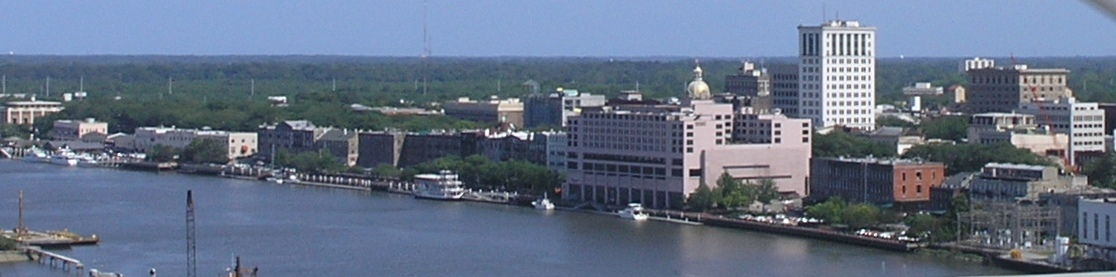
Savannah, Georgia's fifth-most populous city

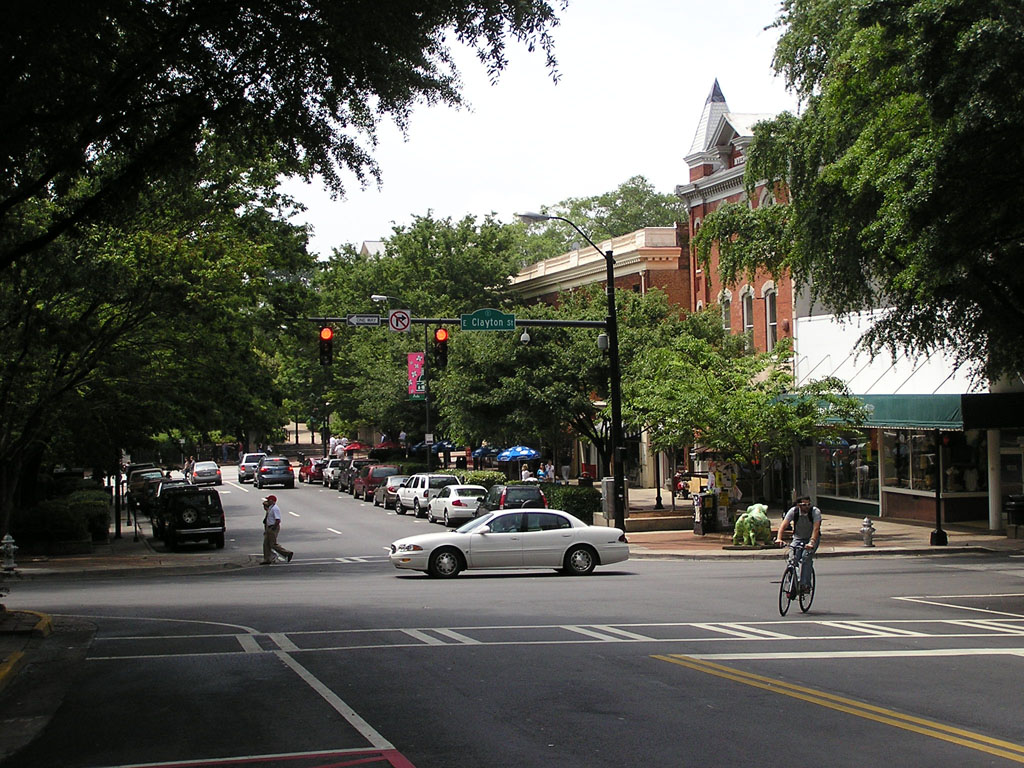
Athens, Georgia's sixth-most populous city

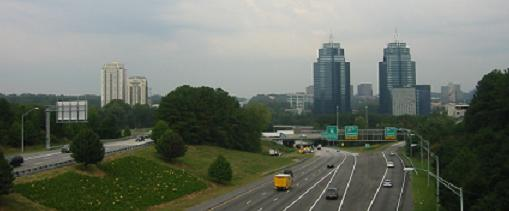
Sandy Springs, Georgia's seventh-most populous city
