= Youth, Georgia =

Unincorporated community in Georgia, U.S.

Coordinates: 33°47′07″N 83°51′22″W

Youth is an unincorporated community in Walton County, in the U.S. state of Georgia.

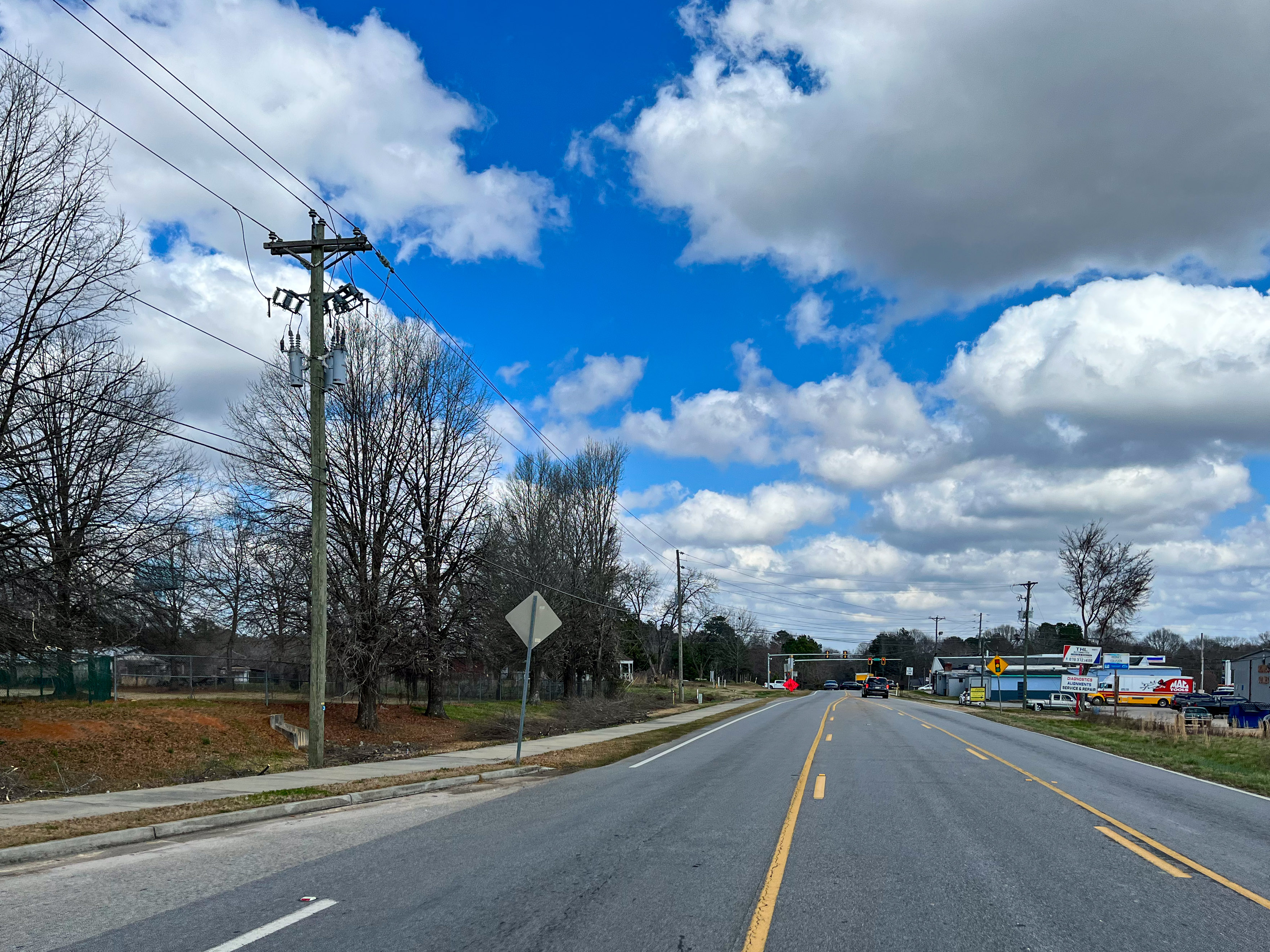
Youth, Georgia from Centerhill Church Road facing towards Georgia Highway 81.

== History ==
A post office called Youth was established in 1895, and remained in operation until 1900. The name Youth was "wistfully" applied to this community.

== Education ==
Public education in Youth is administered by Walton County School District. The district operates Youth Elementary School and Youth Middle School.
