= Walton County School District (Georgia) =

School district in Georgia (U.S. state)

Address
- 200 Double Springs Church Road Southwest Monroe, Georgia, 30656-4665; United States
- Coordinates: 33.82079°N 83.750918°W

District information
- Grades: Pre-school - 12
- Superintendent: Nathan Franklin
- Accreditations: Southern Association of Colleges and Schools; Georgia Accrediting Commission

Students and staff
- Enrollment: 10,374
- Faculty: 675

Other information
- Website: www.walton.k12.ga.us

The Walton County School District is a public school district in Walton County, Georgia, United States, based in Monroe.

It includes all portions of Walton County except for areas in Social Circle. Its boundary includes, in addition to Monroe: Between, Good Hope, Jersey, and Walnut Grove, as well as the Walton County portion of Loganville. It also serves the communities of Bold Springs and Campton.

The district received national attention in 2025 when a video of a teacher at Walnut Grove High School surfaced that showed him writing a racial slur on a classroom whiteboard while students cheered.

== History ==
The Bill Barr Leadership Award was given to the superintendent, Nathan Franklin, in 2021.

== Schools ==
The Walton County School District has nine elementary schools, three middle schools, and three high schools.

=== Elementary schools ===
- Atha Road Elementary School
- Bay Creek Elementary School
- Harmony Elementary School
- Loganville Elementary School
- Monroe Elementary School
- Sharon Elementary School
- Walker Park Elementary School
- Walnut Grove Elementary School
- Youth Elementary School

=== Middle schools ===
- Carver Middle School
- Loganville Middle School
- Youth Middle School

=== High Schools ===
- Loganville High School
- Monroe Area High School
- Walnut Grove High School
