= Loganville High School =

Public high school in Walton County, Georgia, United States

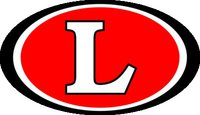

Location
- 100 Trident Trail; Loganville, Georgia; United States
- 33°50′05″N 83°52′09″W

Information
- Type: Public
- Established: 1907
- School district: Walton County School District
- Principal: Matt McDonald
- Staff: 103.20 (FTE)
- Grades: 9-12
- Enrollment: 1,856 (2023-2024)
- Student to teacher ratio: 17.98
- Campus: Suburban
- Colors: Red and White
- Mascot: Pyro the Red Devil
- Website: Loganville High School

Loganville High School (LHS) is located in Walton County, Georgia, United States. Loganville is 35 miles (56 km) east of Atlanta and 38 miles (61 km) west of Athens. The school is a part of the Walton County School District.

Walton County has nine elementary, three middle, and three high schools, and a Performance Learning Center.

== The School ==
Loganville High School is a public, four-year comprehensive high school for grades nine through twelve. It is accredited by the Southern Association of Colleges and Schools.

The present school facility was first occupied in the fall of 1998. In January 2002, a new wing was opened to house an additional 450 students.

With an enrollment of nearly 2,000 students, LHS is a school in transition from rural to urban.

In 2008 LHS was awarded bronze for the highest percentage of students meeting and exceeding standards.

== Faculty ==
Loganville High School employs 137 teachers, four administrators, four counselors, and two media specialists. 22 staff members are certified to work with gifted children. The school also employs five secretaries, ten paraprofessionals, two school resource officers, one school nurse, and eight other support personnel. Five parent volunteers supplement the secretarial and administrative support positions on a regular basis. Many more volunteer their services on testing days and other special occasions.

The principal is Matt McDonald. The assistant principals are John Lamb, Amanda McMillan,and Carrin Meadows.

== Grading Scale ==
Letter grade	%
A	90–100
B	80–89
C	70–79
F	Below 70

== Curriculum ==
LHS uses a 4x4 block schedule that offers academic, technology/career, and elective credits.

Currently, the only foreign language being offered is Spanish.

Work-based learning is offered through the Apprenticeship Youth Program. Career pathway classes (CTAE) that are taken on campus are also offered, as well as fine arts and foreign language pathways.

Dual enrollment offers students a chance to take collegiate level courses during high school through the Walton County Public School System. Students can receive both high school and college credit.

Dual enrollment courses are mainly offered online, but those who choose so may do their classes in-person.

== Advanced Placement ==
Seventeen AP courses are offered at LHS. Many students take advantage of these course offerings. Courses are weighted by adding 10 points to the total class grade. These courses include:

- AP Language/AP American Lit
- AP Literature
- AP Statistics
- AP Calculus
- AP Chemistry
- AP Biology
- AP Physics 1
- AP Environmental Science
- AP U.S. History
- AP Government
- AP Economics
- AP Psychology
- AP Human Geography
- AP Studio Art
- AP Computer Science
- AP Spanish
- AP European History

== Exam Exemption Policy ==
Exam Exemption Policy
Cohort	Course	Class Grade	Absences (Excused/Unexcused)
Seniors	ALL	90+	5 or less
Juniors	ALL	85+	3 or less
Sophomores	Electives	90+	5 or less
Freshmen	Electives	85+	3 or less

Final exams count for 10% of a student's grade. EOCs count as 15% of a student's grades. Some courses have both a final exam and an EOC.

== Graduation Requirements ==
Before graduation, students must accumulate a minimum of 4 English credits, 4 Math credits, 1 PE/Health credit, 4 Science credits, 4 Social Studies credits, 4 Fine Arts/Foreign Language/CTAE credits, and at least 7 other elective credits. This adds up to a grand total of 28 credits. Students who participate in credit recovery options must complete all work a week prior to graduation. Students who do not meet graduation requirements may participate in the following year's ceremonies.

== LHS Makes Headlines ==
- During the 2024-2025 school year, Loganville had its first flag football player in school history get a full-ride college scholarship.
- In April 2022, four students were arrested for an anti-LGBTQ+ incident that occurred on school grounds. WSB-TV and Fox 5 Atlanta both covered the story.

== Sports ==
- Archery
- Baseball
- Basketball
- Bass Fishing
- Cheerleading
- Cross Country
- Track and Field
- eSports
- Flag Football
- Football
- Golf
- Soccer
- Softball
- Swimming & Diving
- Tennis
- Volleyball
- Wrestling

== Notable alumni ==
- Sheldon Arnold, Class of 2020 - CFL football player
- Michael Bohn, Class of 2006 - singer for Woe, Is Me and Issues
- Clint Frazier, Class of 2013 - MLB player for the New York Yankees
- J.R. Jenkins, Class of 1997 - former NFL player
- Storm Johnson, Class of 2010 - former NFL player
- Brandon Moss, Class of 2002 - MLB player for the Oakland Athletics
- Jordan Rager, Class of 2012 - "Voice" of Loganville
