= Gratis, Georgia =

Unincorporated community in Georgia, U.S.

Coordinates: 33°52′57″N 83°39′48″W

Gratis is an unincorporated community in Walton County, Georgia, United States. The community is located between the cities of Monroe and Winder. The community's main intersection is at Gratis and Mt. Vernon Roads.

== History ==
The Georgia General Assembly incorporated the place as the "Town of Gratis" in 1908. The town's charter was dissolved in 1995.

== Economy ==
The economy of Gratis exists predominantly by commuting with the nearby cities of Monroe and Winder. Along with some limited agriculture and livestock there is a single outlet/filling station in the community, locally referred to as the Gratis Store.

In an earlier time, nearby was the Sims Mill powered by a water pond. Most likely, the mill ground corn and wheat for corn meal and flour. Near the pond was the site of an earlier Creek Indian encampment.

== Religion ==
For nearly a century, Center Hill Baptist Church was the sole religious facility in Gratis. It burned down during the 1950s and was rebuilt.

A new church, called Gratis Church was started in August 2011. The church has purchased 15 acres on Perry Smith Road one mile north of the Gratis Store. Gratis Church currently meets at Walker Park Elementary School.

== Education ==
Gratis's educational system is run by the Walton County Board of Education. The schools in the local district are Monroe Elementary, Carver Middle School, and Monroe Area High School. Residents also have the choice of three small private schools, George Walton Academy, Loganville Christian Academy, and Faith Academy.
