= Windsor, Georgia =

Unincorporated community in Georgia, U.S.

Coordinates: 33°52′48″N 83°50′30″W

Windsor is an unincorporated community in Walton County, in the U.S. state of Georgia.

== History ==
A post office called Windsor was established in 1835, and remained in operation until 1902. The community most likely was named after Windsor, England, perhaps via Windsor Castle.
