= Pannell, Georgia =

Unincorporated community in Georgia, U.S.

Coordinates: 33°46′06″N 83°40′30″W

Pannell is an unincorporated community in Walton County, in the U.S. state of Georgia.

== History ==
Variant names were "Cowpens" and "Easleys Cowpens." The present name is after Wiley Hill Pannell, an early settler.
