= Split Silk, Georgia =

Unincorporated community in Georgia, U.S.

Coordinates: 33°49′46″N 83°50′30″W

Split Silk is an unincorporated community in Walton County, in the U.S. state of Georgia.

== History ==
According to tradition, the community received its name from an incident in which a girl's silk dress accidentally was ripped near the local country store.

Little remains of the original community. In 2014, Walton County Board of Commissioners voted in favor of installing town signs to mark the site.
