= Vines Botanical Gardens =

Botanical gardens in Loganville, Georgia, United States

Coordinates: 33.86324°N 83.92231°W

- Interactive map of Vines Botanical Gardens

Vines Botanical Gardens (25 acres) are botanical gardens located at 3500 Oak Grove Road, Loganville, Georgia, United States. They are open daily and no admission fee is charged.

The themed gardens include annuals, perennials, display garden, water garden, garden railroad, and a rose garden, as well as an arboretum, Swan Lake (3.5 acres), Koi pond, fountains and the Manor House. The property also contains a restaurant, and special events rooms.

== See also ==
- List of botanical gardens in the United States
