= Between, Georgia =

- Town
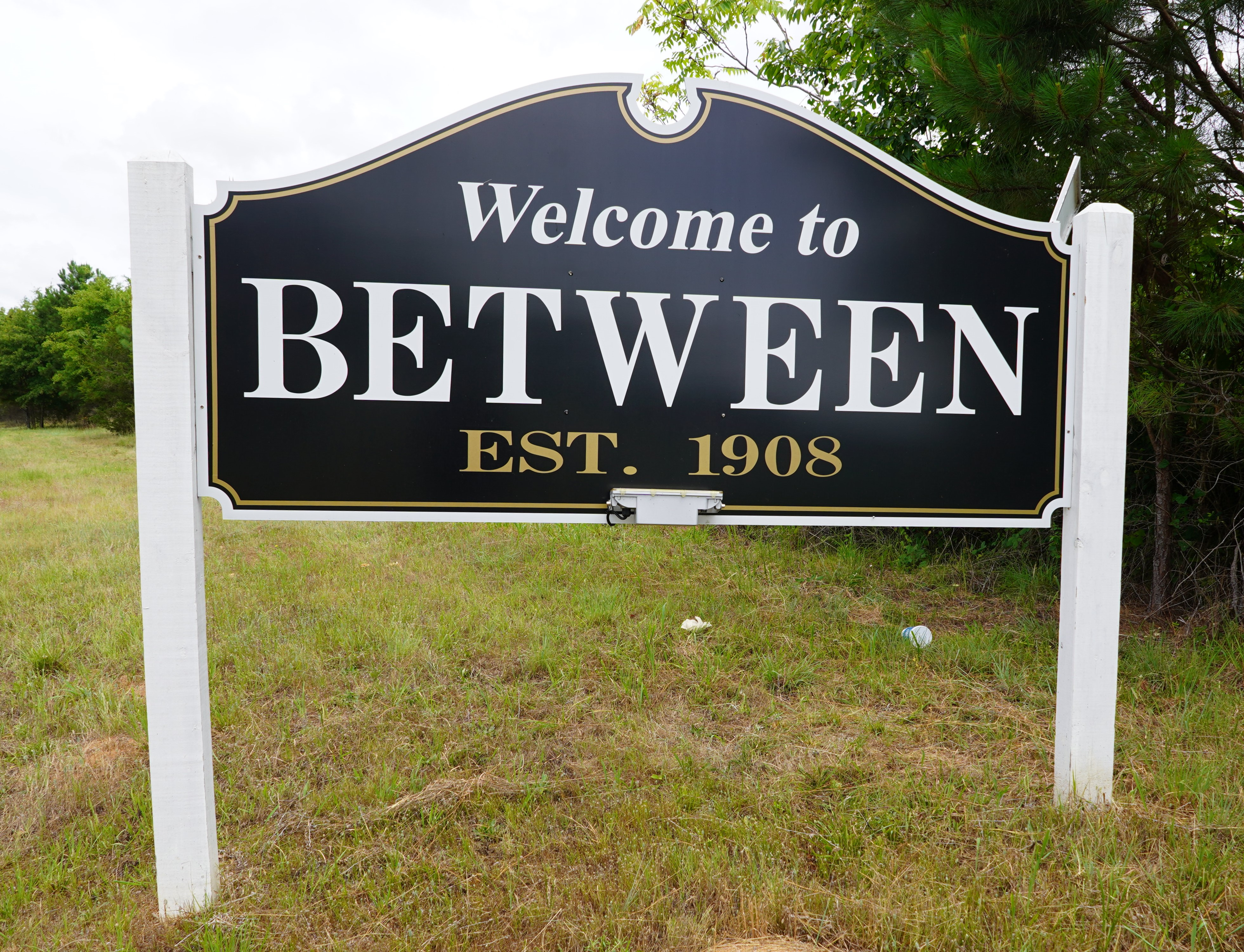
- Between, Georgia

- Location in Walton County and the state of Georgia
- Coordinates: 33°48′50″N 83°48′33″W
- Country: United States
- State: Georgia
- County: Walton

Area
  - Total: 1.19 sq mi (3.07 km^{2})
  - Land: 1.18 sq mi (3.06 km^{2})
  - Water: 0.0039 sq mi (0.01 km^{2})
- Elevation: 961 ft (293 m)

Population (2020)
  - Total: 402
  - Density: 340.3/sq mi (131.39/km^{2})
- Time zone: UTC-5 (Eastern (EST))
  - Summer (DST): UTC-4 (EDT)
- ZIP code: 30655
- Area code: 470/678/770
- FIPS code: 13-07640
- GNIS feature ID: 0311261
- Website: https://townofbetweenga.com/

Between is a town in Walton County, Georgia, United States. As of the 2020 census, the town had a population of 402.

== History ==
The first permanent settlement at Between was made in the 1850s. Between was incorporated in 1908 by an act of the Georgia General Assembly.

It has been suggested by many that the town is called Between because it is equidistant to Atlanta and Athens. It is also between Walton County's two largest cities, Loganville and Monroe. Actually, strong public opposition to annexation by either Loganville or Monroe resulted in a successful public movement to incorporate the area, which struggled with the challenge of choosing a name for the new town. Eventually the simplest and most obvious name was chosen.

== Geography ==
Between is located at 33°48′50″N 83°48′33″W (33.813956, -83.809170).

According to the United States Census Bureau, the town has a total area of 0.9 square miles (2.3 km^{2}), all land.

== Demographics ==
Historical population
Census	Pop.	Note	%±
1910	104		—
1920	101		−2.9%
1930	106		5.0%
1940	115		8.5%
1950	120		4.3%
1960	80		−33.3%
1970	94		17.5%
1980	87		−7.4%
1990	82		−5.7%
2000	148		80.5%
2010	296		100.0%
2020	402		35.8%
U.S. Decennial Census

As of the census of 2000, there were 148 people, 61 households, and 42 families residing in the town. The population density was 170.4 inhabitants per square mile (65.8/km^{2}). There were 63 housing units at an average density of 72.5 per square mile (28.0/km^{2}). The racial makeup of the town was 96.62% White and 3.38% African American. Hispanic or Latino people of any race were 0.68% of the population.

There were 61 households, out of which 23.0% had children under the age of 18 living with them, 59.0% were married couples living together, 6.6% had a female householder with no husband present, and 31.1% were non-families. 24.6% of all households were made up of individuals, and 6.6% had someone living alone who was 65 years of age or older. The average household size was 2.43 and the average family size was 2.98.

In the town, the population was spread out, with 23.6% under the age of 18, 12.2% from 18 to 24, 21.6% from 25 to 44, 31.1% from 45 to 64, and 11.5% who were 65 years of age or older. The median age was 38 years. For every 100 females, there were 117.6 males. For every 100 females age 18 and over, there were 109.3 males.

The median income for a household in the town was $52,222, and the median income for a family was $52,292. Males had a median income of $41,875 versus $24,688 for females. The per capita income for the town was $20,115. There were 12.2% of families and 8.9% of the population living below the poverty line, including 12.8% of under eighteens and 16.7% of individuals over 64.

The 2010 census data revealed that the town of Between was growing in population and was the fourth of seven incorporated cities in Walton County, with a total population of 296. The specifics were as follows:

- Sex: male 48.3%, female 51.6%
- Age: 0-4 10%, 5-17 20.6%, 18-64 59.8%, 65+ 9.5%
- Race: African-American 7.4%, Hispanic 3.3%, White 90.8%
