= Jersey, Georgia =

- Town
- Location in Walton County and the state of Georgia
- Coordinates: 33°43′1″N 83°48′14″W
- Country: United States
- State: Georgia
- County: Walton

Area
  - Total: 0.78 sq mi (2.02 km^{2})
  - Land: 0.78 sq mi (2.01 km^{2})
  - Water: 0.0039 sq mi (0.01 km^{2})
- Elevation: 837 ft (255 m)

Population (2020)
  - Total: 146
  - Density: 188.1/sq mi (72.63/km^{2})
- Time zone: UTC-5 (Eastern (EST))
  - Summer (DST): UTC-4 (EDT)
- ZIP code: 30018
- Area code: 470/678/770
- FIPS code: 13-42184
- GNIS feature ID: 0356336

Jersey is a town in Walton County, Georgia, United States. The population was 146 at the 2020 census.

== History ==
Prior to, and until around 1904, this community was originally known as Centerville since it was almost equidistant from the surrounding towns of: Monroe, Social Circle, Covington, and Loganville. But, when the town decided to establish a US Post Office of its own, rather than have to travel to the county seat to collect mail, a problem arose. Federal Postal Regulations (logically) prohibited two towns in the same State having the same name. This prompted an extended and hot debate in the community that lasted most of the winter. At the time, this area was primarily agricultural and was very well known for its high quality in dairy farming and production of high quality milk.. Only a couple of months prior to this event, Old Man H. D. Ambercrombie (a quite prominent businessman, and early settler in that area) had just taken possession of his newly imported—at great expense—full blooded, Jersey Bull from the European Isle of Jersey, acquired to improve the quality of his herd and to increase their milk production. After much debate, the town applied for and was awarded a name change to "Jersey". They were thus able to establish their own unique Postal Address and establish a US Post Office of their own.

The Georgia General Assembly incorporated Jersey as a town in 1905.

== Geography ==
Jersey is located at 33°43′1″N 83°48′14″W (33.716872, -83.803943).

According to the United States Census Bureau, the town has a total area of 0.8 square miles (2.1 km^{2}), all land.

== Demographics ==
Historical population
Census	Pop.	Note	%±
1910	191		—
1920	202		5.8%
1930	196		−3.0%
1940	188		−4.1%
1950	182		−3.2%
1960	170		−6.6%
1970	180		5.9%
1980	201		11.7%
1990	149		−25.9%
2000	163		9.4%
2010	137		−16.0%
2020	146		6.6%
U.S. Decennial Census

As of the census of 2000, there were 163 people, 61 households, and 45 families residing in the town. By 2020, its population was 146.

== Education ==
Up until the early 1960s, the town of Jersey had its own School and virtually all of the teachers were also local area residents who knew each one of the children, and their entire families. Many attend the same Local Churches, some had their own children as their Students. Some Teachers were Graduates of Jersey's School, and some taught multiple generations of students from the same families.. In 1962, due to a reduction in local school age population and a movement to consolidate local schools, the local school was closed down and students (mostly) transferred to Social Circle Public Schools. There were limited (other) options at that time. A few teachers followed, but most simply Retired from teaching.

The town is now officially considered part of the Walton County School District., although a (small?) percentage do attend Higher Rated Private Schools in the area.
