= Walnut Grove, Georgia =

- Town
- Flag Seal

- Location in Walton County and the state of Georgia
- Coordinates: 33°44′33″N 83°51′09″W
- Country: United States
- State: Georgia
- County: Walton

Area
  - Total: 2.88 sq mi (7.45 km^{2})
  - Land: 2.84 sq mi (7.36 km^{2})
  - Water: 0.035 sq mi (0.09 km^{2})
- Elevation: 922 ft (281 m)

Population (2020)
  - Total: 1,322
  - Density: 465.3/sq mi (179.65/km^{2})
- Time zone: UTC-5 (Eastern (EST))
  - Summer (DST): UTC-4 (EDT)
- ZIP code: 30052
- Area code: 470/678/770
- FIPS code: 13-80228
- GNIS feature ID: 333357
- Website: www.walnutgrovegeorgia.com

Walnut Grove is a town in Walton County, Georgia, United States. The population was 1,322 in 2020.

== History ==
The Georgia General Assembly incorporated Walnut Grove as a town in 1905. The community was named for a grove of walnut trees near the original town site.

== Geography ==
According to the United States Census Bureau, the town has a total area of 1.5 square miles (3.9 km^{2}), all land.

== Demographics ==
Historical population
Census	Pop.	Note	%±
1910	112		—
1920	143		27.7%
1930	110		−23.1%
1940	117		6.4%
1950	121		3.4%
1960	119		−1.7%
1970	175		47.1%
1980	387		121.1%
1990	458		18.3%
2000	1,241		171.0%
2010	1,330		7.2%
2020	1,322		−0.6%
2023 (est.)	1,575	▲	19.1%
U.S. Decennial Census

Walnut Grove racial composition as of 2020
Race	Num.	Perc.
White (non-Hispanic)	1,107	83.74%
Black or African American (non-Hispanic)	87	6.58%
Native American	2	0.15%
Asian	5	0.38%
Other/mixed	59	4.46%
Hispanic or Latino	62	4.69%

As of the 2020 United States census, there were 1,322 people, 515 households, and 371 families residing in the city.

== Education ==
Public education in Walnut Grove is administered by Walton County School District. The district operates Walnut Grove Elementary School and Walnut Grove High School within the city.

== Notable people ==
- Barbecue Bob, blues musician
- Bazoline Estelle Usher, educator
