= Bold Springs, Georgia =

Unincorporated community in Georgia, United States

Coordinates: 33.901°N 83.802°W

Bold Springs is an unincorporated community in Walton County, Georgia, United States. It is located around Georgia State Route 81 and Bold Springs Road. Walton County Parks & Recreation operates the 3-acre (1.2 ha) Bold Springs Park in the community. A variant name is Bold Spring.

== History ==
The first settlement at Bold Springs was made ca. 1899. The community took its name from a nearby spring. The Georgia General Assembly incorporated the town as Williamsville in 1908, but less than one year later in 1909, the legislature repealed its charter, and the old name of "Bold Springs" was restored.
