= Walton County, Georgia =

County in Georgia, United States

- County
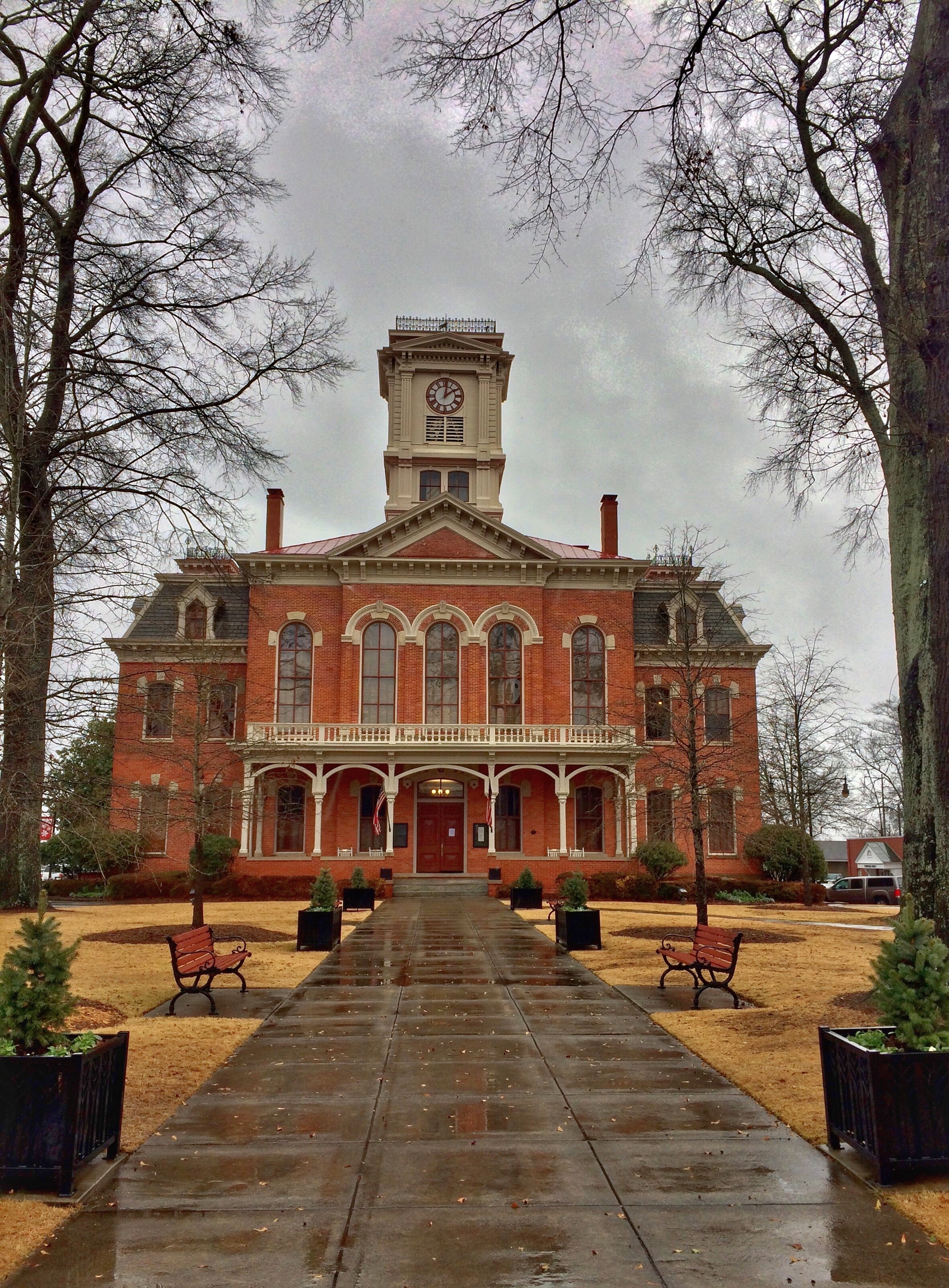
- Walton County courthouse in Monroe

- Flag Seal Logo

- Location within the U.S. state of Georgia
- Coordinates: 33°47′N 83°44′W
- Country: United States
- State: Georgia
- Founded: December 22, 1818; 207 years ago
- Named for: George Walton
- Seat: Monroe
- Largest city: Monroe

Area
  - Total: 330 sq mi (850 km^{2})
  - Land: 326 sq mi (840 km^{2})
  - Water: 4.3 sq mi (11 km^{2}) 1.3%

Population (2020)
  - Total: 96,673
  - Estimate (2025): 112,696 ▲
  - Density: 297/sq mi (115/km^{2})
- Time zone: UTC−5 (Eastern)
  - Summer (DST): UTC−4 (EDT)
- Congressional district: 10th
- Website: waltoncountyga.gov

Walton County is a county located in the East Central region of the U.S. - State of Georgia. As of the 2020 census, the population was 96,673. It is located about 30 miles east of the state capital, the city of Atlanta. Monroe is the county seat; Loganville is another major city.

Walton County is part of the Atlanta-Sandy Springs-Roswell, GA metropolitan statistical area.

== History ==
Walton County was created on December 15, 1818. It is named for George Walton, one of the three men from Georgia who signed the United States Declaration of Independence. The other two were Button Gwinnett and Lyman Hall.

A Supreme Court ruling in April 1946 had ruled that white primaries were unconstitutional, enabling some black citizens in Georgia to cast ballots for the first time during the primary race later that summer. This increased social tensions in many areas, as whites continued to oppose voting by blacks. In addition, many whites resisted black veterans' efforts to gain expanded freedoms following their service during World War II.

=== Moore's Ford lynchings (1946) ===
In July 1946, four African Americans were lynched in Walton County, Georgia. The victims were two married couples: George and Mae Murray Dorsey, and Roger and Dorothy Dorsey Malcom (reportedly pregnant).

A historical highway marker erected by the state in the 21st century reads:

2.4 miles east, at Moore’s Ford Bridge on the Apalachee River, four African-Americans - George and Mae Murray Dorsey and Roger and Dorothy Dorsey Malcom (reportedly 7 months pregnant) - were brutally beaten and shot by an unmasked mob on the afternoon of July 25, 1946. The lynching followed an argument between Roger Malcom and a local white farmer. These unsolved murders played a crucial role in both President Truman’s commitment to civil rights legislation and the ensuing modern civil rights movement.

== Geography ==
According to the U.S. Census Bureau, the county has a total area of 330 square miles (850 km^{2}), of which 326 square miles (840 km^{2}) is land and 4.3 square miles (11 km^{2}) (1.3%) is water. The county is located in the Piedmont region of the state.

The western half of Walton County, in a half circle from Social Circle through Monroe to northeast of Loganville, is located in the Upper Ocmulgee River sub-basin of the Altamaha River basin. The eastern part of the county, east of that curve, is located in the Upper Oconee River sub-basin of the same Altamaha River basin.

=== Adjacent counties ===
- Barrow County – north
- Oconee County – northeast
- Morgan County – southeast
- Newton County – south
- Rockdale County – southwest
- Gwinnett County – northwest

== Communities ==
=== Cities ===
- Jersey
- Loganville
- Monroe
- Social Circle
- Walnut Grove

=== Towns ===
- Between
- Good Hope

=== Unincorporated communities ===
- Bold Springs
- Campton
- Gratis
- Mt. Vernon
- Pannell
- Windsor
- Youth
- Split Silk
- Whatley
- Nicholasville
- Alcovy Mountain
- Ebenezer

== Demographics ==
Historical population
Census	Pop.	Note	%±
1810	1,026		—
1820	4,192		308.6%
1830	10,929		160.7%
1840	10,209		−6.6%
1850	10,821		6.0%
1860	11,074		2.3%
1870	11,038		−0.3%
1880	15,622		41.5%
1890	17,467		11.8%
1900	20,942		19.9%
1910	25,393		21.3%
1920	24,216		−4.6%
1930	21,118		−12.8%
1940	20,777		−1.6%
1950	20,230		−2.6%
1960	20,481		1.2%
1970	23,404		14.3%
1980	31,211		33.4%
1990	38,586		23.6%
2000	60,687		57.3%
2010	83,768		38.0%
2020	96,673		15.4%
2025 (est.)	112,696	▲	16.6%
U.S. Decennial Census; 1790-1880 1890-1910; 1920-1930 1930-1940; 1940-1950 1960-1980; 1980-2000 2010 2020

There was a noted decline in the African American population from 1900 to 1960 as thousands left rural areas in the South during the Great Migration to the North, Midwest and West Coast to escape social oppression and to gain better jobs and opportunities.

With dramatic new growth related to the rise of Atlanta as a corporate city, the demographics have changed and the county is majority white in the 21st century. The area has been developed for suburban housing and retail.

=== Racial and ethnic composition ===
Walton County, Georgia – Racial and ethnic composition Note: the US Census treats Hispanic/Latino as an ethnic category. This table excludes Latinos from the racial categories and assigns them to a separate category. Hispanics/Latinos may be of any race.
Race / Ethnicity (NH = Non-Hispanic)	Pop 1980	Pop 1990	Pop 2000	Pop 2010	Pop 2020	% 1980	% 1990	% 2000	% 2010	% 2020
White alone (NH)	24,363	30,960	49,731	65,677	68,499	78.06%	80.24%	81.95%	78.40%	70.86%
Black or African American alone (NH)	6,459	7,062	8,703	12,993	17,136	20.69%	18.30%	14.34%	15.51%	17.73%
Native American or Alaska Native alone (NH)	36	85	145	194	188	0.12%	0.22%	0.24%	0.23%	0.19%
Asian alone (NH)	45	134	410	947	1,409	0.14%	0.35%	0.68%	1.13%	1.46%
Native Hawaiian or Pacific Islander alone (NH)	x	x	10	38	44	x	x	0.02%	0.05%	0.05%
Other race alone (NH)	27	7	25	159	552	0.09%	0.02%	0.04%	0.19%	0.57%
Mixed race or Multiracial (NH)	x	x	500	1,077	3,617	x	x	0.82%	1.29%	3.74%
Hispanic or Latino (any race)	281	338	1,163	2,683	5,228	0.90%	0.88%	1.92%	3.20%	5.41%
Total	31,211	38,586	60,687	83,768	96,673	100.00%	100.00%	100.00%	100.00%	100.00%

=== 2020 census ===
As of the 2020 census, the county had a population of 96,673, 33,924 households, and 25,736 families residing in the county. The median age was 39.7 years, 24.4% of residents were under the age of 18, and 16.4% of residents were 65 years of age or older. For every 100 females there were 93.6 males, and for every 100 females age 18 and over there were 90.6 males age 18 and over.

41.9% of residents lived in urban areas, while 58.1% lived in rural areas.

The racial makeup of the county was 72.0% White, 17.9% Black or African American, 0.3% American Indian and Alaska Native, 1.5% Asian, 0.1% Native Hawaiian and Pacific Islander, 2.6% from some other race, and 5.6% from two or more races. Hispanic or Latino residents of any race comprised 5.4% of the population.

There were 33,924 households in the county, of which 36.8% had children under the age of 18 living with them and 24.4% had a female householder with no spouse or partner present. About 19.5% of all households were made up of individuals and 9.5% had someone living alone who was 65 years of age or older.

There were 35,473 housing units, of which 4.4% were vacant. Among occupied housing units, 75.2% were owner-occupied and 24.8% were renter-occupied. The homeowner vacancy rate was 1.4% and the rental vacancy rate was 4.7%.

== Government ==
Walton County has a six-member commission elected from single-member districts. This legislative body can pass laws for the county and tax bills. The county chairman is elected at-large to serve as the leader. If a seat becomes vacant during the term, the governor can appoint someone to fill the seat, based on recommendations. In 2015, two of the six positions were filled by appointees.

=== Politics ===
As of the 2020s, Walton County is a strongly Republican voting county, voting 72.6% for Donald Trump in 2024. Since 1984, Walton County has been heavily Republican, and no Democratic presidential candidate has managed to reach even 30% of the county's vote since 1996.

For elections to the United States House of Representatives, Walton County is part of Georgia's 10th congressional district, currently represented by Mike Collins. For elections to the Georgia State Senate, Walton County is divided between districts 42 and 46. For elections to the Georgia House of Representatives, Walton County is part of districts 111, 112 and 114.

United States presidential election results for Walton County, Georgia
Year	Republican		Democratic		Third party(ies)	
Year	No.	%	No.	%	No.	%
1912	40	3.35%	885	74.06%	270	22.59%
1916	83	5.61%	1,305	88.24%	91	6.15%
1920	123	9.38%	1,189	90.63%	0	0.00%
1924	90	8.78%	873	85.17%	62	6.05%
1928	424	27.20%	1,135	72.80%	0	0.00%
1932	36	1.66%	2,136	98.34%	0	0.00%
1936	132	6.33%	1,952	93.58%	2	0.10%
1940	104	4.55%	2,179	95.24%	5	0.22%
1944	172	7.75%	2,046	92.25%	0	0.00%
1948	164	5.71%	2,440	84.99%	267	9.30%
1952	324	8.11%	3,672	91.89%	0	0.00%
1956	470	12.56%	3,271	87.44%	0	0.00%
1960	403	11.52%	3,095	88.48%	0	0.00%
1964	2,874	54.99%	2,350	44.97%	2	0.04%
1968	1,399	19.99%	1,552	22.18%	4,047	57.83%
1972	3,994	77.80%	1,140	22.20%	0	0.00%
1976	1,687	23.80%	5,402	76.20%	0	0.00%
1980	2,618	35.85%	4,525	61.96%	160	2.19%
1984	4,995	66.81%	2,481	33.19%	0	0.00%
1988	5,974	65.56%	3,091	33.92%	47	0.52%
1992	5,619	45.35%	4,821	38.91%	1,951	15.75%
1996	7,934	52.82%	5,618	37.40%	1,468	9.77%
2000	12,966	67.95%	5,484	28.74%	633	3.32%
2004	21,594	78.11%	5,887	21.29%	166	0.60%
2008	27,253	75.54%	8,469	23.47%	357	0.99%
2012	29,036	77.07%	8,148	21.63%	493	1.31%
2016	31,125	76.18%	8,292	20.29%	1,441	3.53%
2020	37,839	74.05%	12,683	24.82%	576	1.13%
2024	42,407	72.64%	15,605	26.73%	364	0.62%

United States Senate election results for Walton County, Georgia2
Year	Republican		Democratic		Third party(ies)	
Year	No.	%	No.	%	No.	%
2020	37,399	73.71%	12,146	23.94%	1,193	2.35%
2020	33,908	74.54%	11,583	25.46%	0	0.00%

United States Senate election results for Walton County, Georgia3
Year	Republican		Democratic		Third party(ies)	
Year	No.	%	No.	%	No.	%
2020	22,813	45.26%	8,443	16.75%	19,152	37.99%
2020	37,842	74.90%	12,682	25.10%	0	0.00%
2022	30,553	72.30%	10,702	25.32%	1,004	2.38%
2022	28,147	73.61%	10,089	26.39%	0	0.00%

Georgia Gubernatorial election results for Walton County
Year	Republican		Democratic		Third party(ies)	
Year	No.	%	No.	%	No.	%
2022	32,567	76.71%	9,573	22.55%	312	0.73%

== Education ==
Walton County School District is the local school district for all sections except those in Social Circle. Areas in Social Circle are in the Social Circle City School District.

=== Schools ===
- Loganville High School
- Monroe Area High School
- Walnut Grove High School
- Foothills Charter High School (alternative school inside of MAHS)
- Loganville Middle School
- Carver Middle School
- Youth Middle School
- Loganville Elementary School
- Bay Creek Elementary School
- Sharon Elementary School
- Walker Park Elementary School
- Youth Elementary School
- Monroe Elementary School
- Victory Baptist School (Private)
- Trinity Prep School (Private)
- George Walton Academy (Private)
- Loganville Christian Academy (Private)
- Monroe Country Day School (Private)

== Transportation ==
=== Major highways ===
- I-20 / SR 402 (unsigned)
- US 78 / SR 10
  - SR 10 Bus.
- US 278 / SR 12
- SR 11
- SR 20
- SR 81
- SR 83
  - SR 83 Conn.
- SR 138
- SR 186

Walton County doesn't have any pedestrian trails. However, there are trails in neighboring Gwinnett and Rockdale county such as the Arabia Mountain Path, Conyers Trail and Cedar Creek Trail Loop.

== See also ==
- National Register of Historic Places listings in Walton County, Georgia
- Hard Labor Creek Regional Reservoir
- List of counties in Georgia
