= Jordan Rager =

American country music singer (b. 1994)

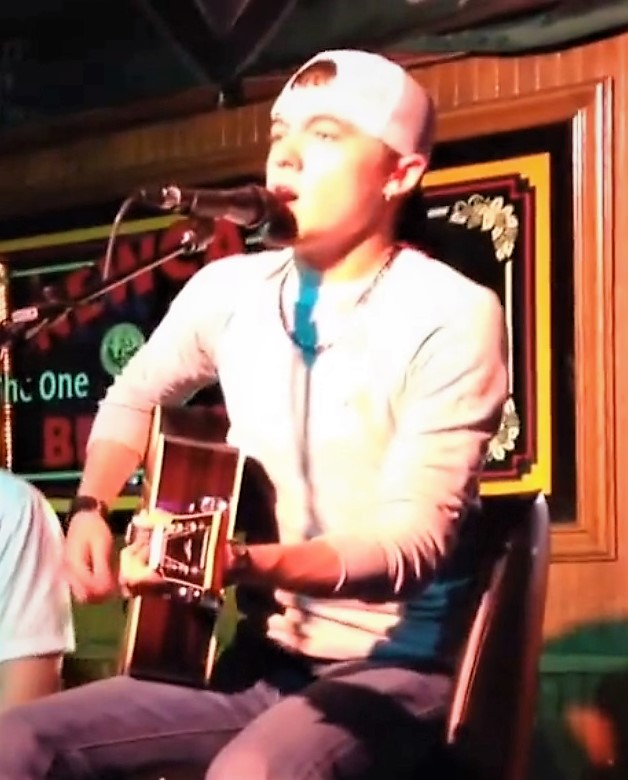
- Rager playing at Zydeco in 2014

Background information
- Born: February 21, 1994 (age 32); Loganville, Georgia
- Origin: Nashville, Tennessee
- Genres: Country
- Years active: 2014-present
- Labels: Riser House; Broken Bow

Jordan Rager (born February 21, 1994) is an American country music singer.

Rager was born in Loganville, Georgia. He performed in local bars since age 15, and was mentored by Barry Williams, who is Jason Aldean's father. He gained popularity by singing cover versions of popular country music songs, amassing more than 3.7 million viewers on YouTube as a result. One of the artists who discovered his videos was Justin Moore, who chose him to perform on the "Off the Beaten Path" tour. Rager was signed to Broken Bow Records in 2014.

Rager released his debut single, "Southern Boy", via Broken Bow in February 2016. The song, which features Aldean on duet vocals, was written by Luke Laird, Barry Dean, Jeremy Stover, and Jaron Boyer, with Stover also serving as producer. Jordan Rager's Second Single, "Now That I Know Your Name" released to country radio on September 19, 2016.

Jordan amicably parted ways with Broken Bow, and signed a deal with his current label, Riser House Records in 2017. On March 30, 2018, his single, "One of the Good Ones" was released via Riser House. The single, written by Ross Ellis, Chris Stevens, and James McNair, is the first from Rager's upcoming EP.

In June 2021, Rager signed with Sprockets Music.

== Discography ==
=== Extended plays ===
Title	Details	Sales
Southern Boy	Release date: October 28, 2016; Label: Broken Bow Records; Formats: Music download	US: 700

=== Singles ===
Year	Title	Peak chart positions		Albums
Year	Title	US Country	US Country Airplay	Albums
2016	"Southern Boy" (with Jason Aldean)	41	37	Southern Boy EP
2016	"Now That I Know Your Name"	—	—	Southern Boy EP
2018	"One of the Good Ones"	—	—	—N/a
2019	"Colorblind"	—	—	—N/a

=== Music videos ===
Year	Video	Director
2016	"Southern Boy"	Ford Fairchild
