= Campton, Georgia =

- Unincorporated community
- Location within Georgia
- Coordinates: 33°52′18″N 83°43′13″W
- Country: United States
- State: Georgia
- County: Walton
- Elevation: 925 ft (282 m)
- Time zone: UTC-5 (Eastern (EST))
  - Summer (DST): UTC-4 (EDT)
- Area code: 470/678/770
- GNIS feature ID: 354976

Campton is an unincorporated community in Walton County, Georgia, United States. It is located approximately 15 miles (24 km) from Dacula and Highway 316.

== History ==
An early variant name was "Camp's Station". The Georgia General Assembly incorporated the place as the "Town of Campton" in 1905, with corporate limits extending in a one-half mile radius from the storehouse of William F. Camp. The town's charter was officially dissolved in 1995.

The William Harris Homestead, which is listed on the National Register of Historic Places, is located in or near Campton.

== In the media ==
The 2012 film Wanderlust was shot on location in Campton.
