= Loganville, Georgia =

- City
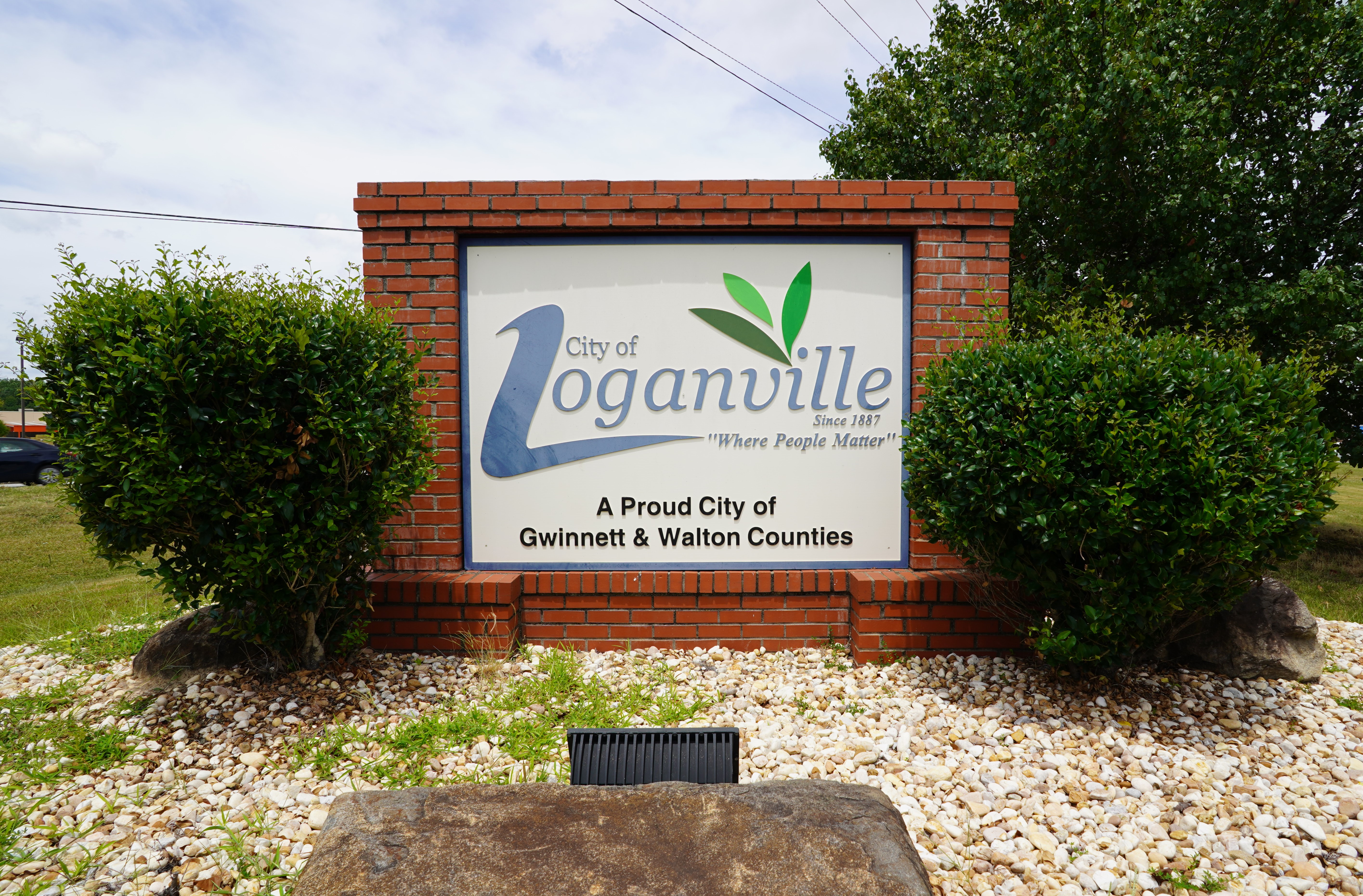
- Loganville, Georgia

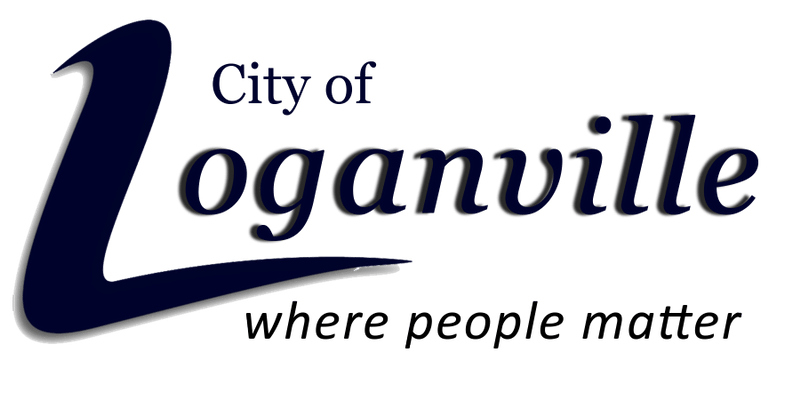
- Logo
- Motto: "Where people matter"
- Location in Walton County and the state of Georgia

- Location in Metro Atlanta
- Coordinates: 33°50′07″N 83°53′45″W
- Country: United States
- State: Georgia
- Counties: Walton, Gwinnett

Government
  - Mayor: Skip Baliles

Area
  - Total: 7.45 sq mi (19.29 km^{2})
  - Land: 7.41 sq mi (19.18 km^{2})
  - Water: 0.046 sq mi (0.12 km^{2})
- Elevation: 978 ft (298 m)

Population (2020)
  - Total: 14,127
  - Density: 1,907.9/sq mi (736.63/km^{2})
- Time zone: UTC-5 (Eastern (EST))
  - Summer (DST): UTC-4 (EDT)
- ZIP code: 30052
- Area code: 770
- FIPS code: 13-47196
- GNIS feature ID: 2404948
- Website: loganville-ga.gov

Loganville is a city in Walton and Gwinnett counties, Georgia, United States. The population was 16,516 as of 2023. Loganville is located about 36 mi (58 km) east of Atlanta and is part of the Atlanta metropolitan area.

== History ==
An early variant name was "Buncombe". It was then renamed after James Harvie Logan, an early settler.

During the American Civil War Union cavalry passed through Loganville during an expedition known as Garrard's Cavalry Raid. The encounter is commemorated by a historical marker.

The Georgia General Assembly incorporated Loganville as a town in 1887.

== Geography ==
Loganville is in western Walton County, with the city limits extending west into southeastern Gwinnett County. U.S. Route 78 (Atlanta Highway) passes through the center of town, leading east 5 miles (8 km) to Monroe, the Walton County seat, and west 32 miles (51 km) to downtown Atlanta. Georgia State Route 20 leads northwest from Loganville 10 miles (16 km) to Lawrenceville, the Gwinnett County seat, and southwest 15 miles (24 km) to Conyers. Georgia State Route 81 leads northeast 16 miles (26 km) to Winder and south 18 miles (29 km) to Covington.

According to the United States Census Bureau, Loganville has a total area of 7.4 square miles (19.1 km^{2}), of which 7.3 square miles (19.0 km^{2}) is land and 0.04 square miles (0.1 km^{2}), or 0.60%, is water. It is about 36 mi (58 km) from downtown Atlanta and is part of the Atlanta metropolitan area.

== Demographics ==
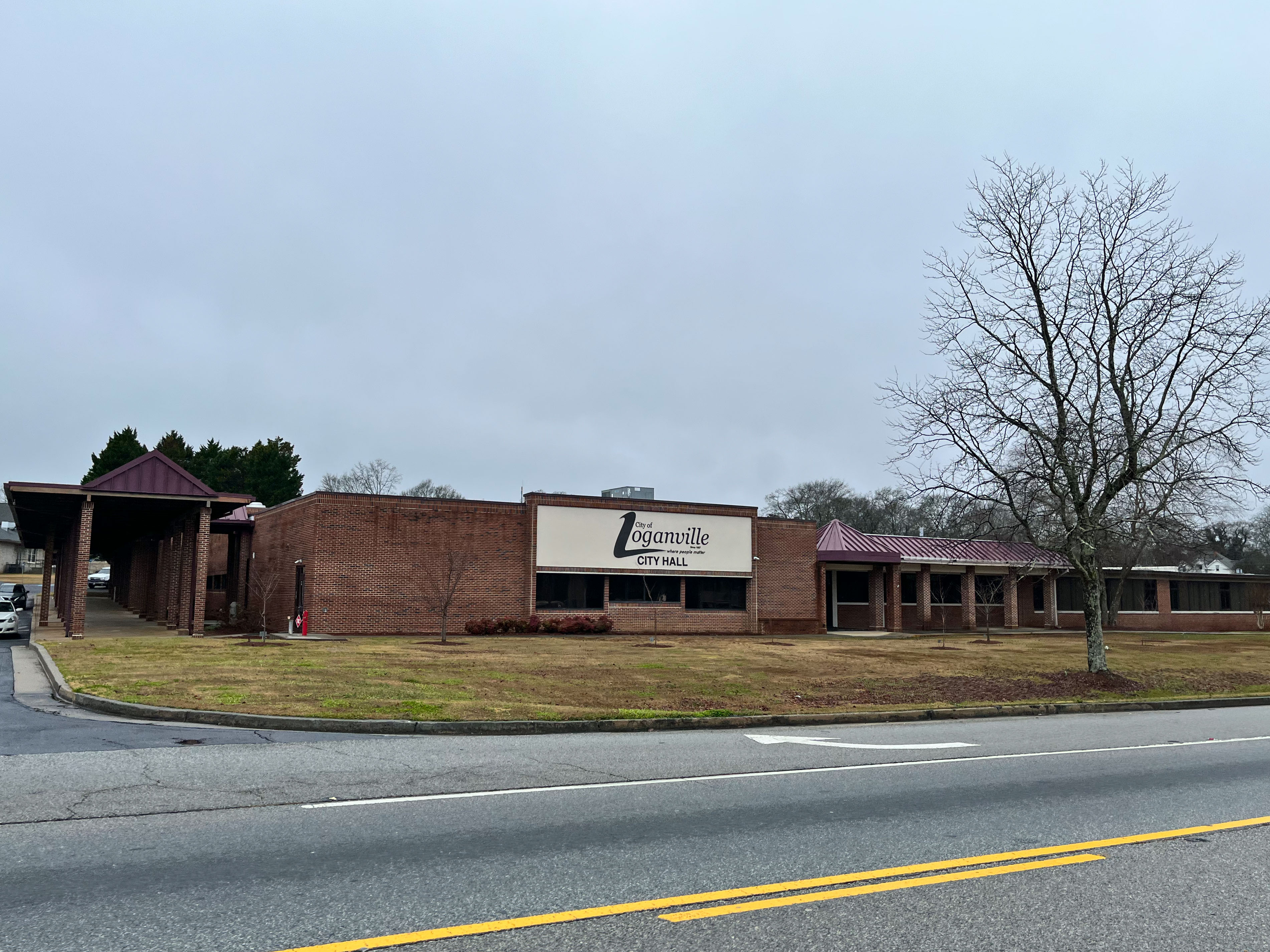
Loganville City Hall

Historical population
Census	Pop.	Note	%±
1880	242		—
1890	338		39.7%
1900	431		27.5%
1910	600		39.2%
1920	711		18.5%
1930	631		−11.3%
1940	627		−0.6%
1950	699		11.5%
1960	926		32.5%
1970	1,318		42.3%
1980	1,841		39.7%
1990	3,180		72.7%
2000	5,435		70.9%
2010	10,458		92.4%
2020	14,127		35.1%
2025 (est.)	17,212	▲	21.8%
U.S. Decennial Census; 2025

=== 2020 census ===
As of the 2020 census, Loganville had a population of 14,127. The median age was 36.5 years. 27.2% of residents were under the age of 18 and 14.2% were 65 years of age or older. For every 100 females there were 85.4 males, and for every 100 females age 18 and over there were 81.6 males age 18 and over.

There were 4,697 households in Loganville, including 3,112 families. Of all households, 45.2% had children under the age of 18 living in them. Of all households, 51.5% were married-couple households, 12.1% were households with a male householder and no spouse or partner present, and 30.4% were households with a female householder and no spouse or partner present. About 19.0% of all households were made up of individuals and 9.5% had someone living alone who was 65 years of age or older.

There were 4,858 housing units, of which 3.3% were vacant. The homeowner vacancy rate was 1.1% and the rental vacancy rate was 4.0%.

99.9% of residents lived in urban areas, while 0.1% lived in rural areas.

Loganville racial composition as of 2020
Race	Num.	Perc.
White (non-Hispanic)	6,305	44.63%
Black or African American (non-Hispanic)	5,109	36.16%
Native American	32	0.23%
Asian	410	2.9%
Pacific Islander	4	0.03%
Other/Mixed	721	5.1%
Hispanic or Latino	1,546	10.94%

== Arts and culture ==
Points of interest include:

- Vines Botanical Gardens
- Holy Cross Cathedral, the cathedral of the Anglican Diocese of the South

== Education ==
The portion in Walton County is in the boundary of the Walton County School District. The portion in Gwinnett County is in the Gwinnett County Public Schools.

=== Public schools ===
Schools located in Loganville administered by the Walton County Public School System include:

- Loganville High School
- Bay Creek Elementary

== Infrastructure ==
Eastside Rehabilitation Hospital, a 40-bed facility, is located in Loganville.

== Notable people ==
- Bobby Byrd, singer with James Brown, founder of Rock and Roll Hall of Fame vocal group The Famous Flames.
- Kyle Chandler, actor
- Clint Frazier, Major League Baseball player
- Jon Langston, country singer
- Austin Meadows, Major League Baseball player
- Brandon Moss, Major League Baseball player
- Jordan Pruitt, pop singer
- Jeffrey Webb, former president of CONCACAF who was arrested in the 2015 FIFA corruption case in May 2015
- Wayne Gallman, NFL running back for the Minnesota Vikings
- Jordan Rager, country singer
- Amanda Rollins, NYPD Sergeant (fictional character on Law & Order: Special Victims Unit)
- William and Zachary Zulock, child rapists and sex offenders
