= List of places in Georgia (U.S. state) (S–Z) =

This list of current cities, towns, unincorporated communities, counties, and other recognized places in the U.S. state of Georgia also includes information on the number and names of counties in which the place lies, and its lower and upper ZIP Code bounds, if applicable.

== List ==
| Name of place | Number of counties | Principal county | Lower zip code | Upper zip code |
|---|---|---|---|---|
| Saffold | 1 | Early County | | |
| Saginaw | 1 | Coffee County | | |
| Saint Charles | 1 | Coweta County | 30259 | |
| Saint Clair | 1 | Burke County | 30816 | |
| Saint George | 1 | Charlton County | 31646 | |
| Saint Louis | 1 | Macon County | | |
| Saint Marks | 1 | Meriwether County | 30230 | |
| Saint Marys | 1 | Camden County | 31558 | |
| Saint Marys Hills | 1 | Muscogee County | | |
| Saint Simons | 1 | Glynn County | | |
| Saint Simons Island | 1 | Glynn County | 31522 | |
| Salacoa | 1 | Cherokee County | | |
| Sale City | 1 | Mitchell County | 31784 | |
| Salem | 1 | Catoosa County | | |
| Salem | 1 | Oconee County | 30638 | |
| Salem | 1 | Upson County | | |
| Salter | 1 | Brantley County | | |
| Sanborn | 1 | Dougherty County | 31701 | |
| Sandalwood | 1 | Dougherty County | 31701 | |
| Sand Bed | 1 | Houston County | | |
| Sandersville | 1 | Washington County | 31082 | |
| Sandfly | 1 | Chatham County | 31406 | |
| Sand Hill | 1 | Carroll County | 30180 | |
| Sand Hill | 1 | Ware County | 31550 | |
| Sandtown | 1 | Wilkes County | 30673 | |
| Sandy | 1 | Butts County | | |
| Sandy Bottom | 1 | Atkinson County | | |
| Sandy Cross | 1 | Franklin County | 30662 | |
| Sandy Cross | 1 | Oglethorpe County | 30627 | |
| Sandy Ford | 1 | Rabun County | | |
| Sandy Hill | 1 | Wilkes County | | |
| Sandy Plains | 1 | Cobb County | 30075 | |
| Sandy Point | 1 | Crawford County | | |
| Sandy Run | 1 | Hancock County | | |
| Sandy Springs | 1 | Fulton County | 30328 | |
| Sanford | 1 | Madison County | 30646 | |
| Sanford | 1 | Stewart County | 31815 | |
| Santa Claus | 1 | Toombs County | 30436 | |
| Santaluca | 1 | Gilmer County | | |
| Sapelo Island | 1 | McIntosh County | 31327 | |
| Sapp | 1 | Bleckley County | 31014 | |
| Sapps Still | 1 | Coffee County | | |
| Sappville | 1 | Ware County | | |
| Sarah | 1 | Union County | | |
| Sardis | 1 | Burke County | 30456 | |
| Sargent | 1 | Coweta County | 30275 | |
| Sasser | 1 | Terrell County | 31785 | |
| Satilla | 1 | Jeff Davis County | | |
| Satolah | 1 | Rabun County | 30525 | |
| Sautee | 1 | White County | | |
| Savannah | 1 | Chatham County | 31401 | 99 |
| Savannah Beach | 1 | Chatham County | | |
| Savannah Municipal Airport | 1 | Chatham County | 31401 | |
| Savannah State College | 1 | Chatham County | | |
| Sawdust | 1 | Columbia County | | |
| Sawhatchee | 1 | Early County | | |
| Sawtell | 1 | Fulton County | | |
| Saxon | 1 | Oglethorpe County | | |
| Scarboro | 1 | Jenkins County | 30442 | |
| Scarbrough Cross Roads | 1 | Henry County | 30049 | |
| Scarlet | 1 | Camden County | | |
| Scenic Hills | 1 | Catoosa County | | |
| Schatulga | 1 | Muscogee County | 31820 | |
| Schlatterville | 1 | Brantley County | 31542 | |
| Schley | 1 | Colquitt County | 31768 | |
| Schoen | 1 | Fulton County | | |
| Scooterville | 1 | Worth County | | |
| Scotchville | 1 | Camden County | | |
| Scotland | 2 | Telfair County | 31083 | |
| Scotland | 2 | Wheeler County | 31083 | |
| Scott | 2 | Johnson County | 31095 | |
| Scott | 2 | Laurens County | 31095 | |
| Scottdale | 1 | DeKalb County | 30079 | |
| Scottsboro | 1 | Baldwin County | 31061 | |
| Scotts Corner | 1 | Burke County | | |
| Screven | 1 | Wayne County | 31560 | |
| Screven Fork | 1 | Liberty County | | |
| Scrutchins | 1 | Lee County | | |
| Scuffletown | 1 | McDuffie County | | |
| Seabrook | 1 | Liberty County | | |
| Sea Island | 1 | Glynn County | 31561 | |
| S E A Junction | 1 | Warren County | | |
| Seals | 1 | Camden County | | |
| Sells | 1 | Jackson County | 30548 | |
| Seney | 1 | Polk County | 30104 | |
| Senoia | 1 | Coweta County | 30276 | |
| Sessoms | 1 | Bacon County | 31554 | |
| Seville | 1 | Wilcox County | 31084 | |
| Seymour | 1 | Putnam County | 31024 | |
| Shady Dale | 1 | Jasper County | 31085 | |
| Shady Grove | 1 | Carroll County | | |
| Shannon | 1 | Floyd County | 30172 | |
| Sharon | 1 | Taliaferro County | 30664 | |
| Sharon Park | 1 | Chatham County | 31401 | |
| Sharphagen | 1 | Seminole County | | |
| Sharpsboro | 1 | Coweta County | | |
| Sharpsburg | 1 | Coweta County | 30277 | |
| Sharps Spur | 1 | Montgomery County | 30410 | |
| Sharp Top | 1 | Cherokee County | 30114 | |
| Shawnee | 1 | Effingham County | 31329 | |
| Shellbine | 1 | Camden County | | |
| Shell Bluff | 1 | Burke County | 30830 | |
| Shellman | 1 | Randolph County | 31786 | |
| Shellman Bluff | 1 | McIntosh County | 31331 | |
| Shelly | 2 | Brooks County | 31778 | |
| Shelly | 2 | Thomas County | 31778 | |
| Sheltonville | 1 | Forsyth County | 30269 | |
| Sheltonville | 1 | Fulton County | 30174 | |
| Shenandoah | 1 | Coweta County | 30265 | |
| Shepherd | 1 | Wayne County | | |
| Sheppards | 1 | Screven County | 30467 | |
| Sherm Siding | 1 | Clarke County | | |
| Sherwood | 1 | Clayton County | 30236 | |
| Sherwood Forest | 1 | Bibb County | | |
| Sherwood Forest | 1 | Coweta County | 30263 | |
| Sherwood Forest | 1 | Floyd County | 30161 | |
| Shewmake | 1 | Laurens County | | |
| Shields Crossroads | 1 | Walker County | 30707 | |
| Shiloh | 1 | Harris County | 31826 | |
| Shiloh | 1 | Lowndes County | 31623 | |
| Shiloh | 1 | Madison County | | |
| Shiloh | 1 | Sumter County | | |
| Shingler | 1 | Worth County | 31781 | |
| Shipps Spur | 1 | Sumter County | | |
| Shirley Grove | 1 | Habersham County | | |
| Shirley Hills | 1 | Bibb County | | |
| Shirley Park | 1 | Chatham County | | |
| Shiver | 1 | Brooks County | | |
| Shivers Mill | 1 | Randolph County | | |
| Shoal Creek | 1 | Hart County | 30553 | |
| Shoals | 1 | Warren County | 30820 | |
| Shookville | 1 | Catoosa County | | |
| Shoptaw | 1 | Coffee County | | |
| Shorts Mill | 1 | Habersham County | | |
| Shoulderbone | 1 | Hancock County | | |
| Shurlington | 1 | Bibb County | 31211 | |
| Sibbie | 1 | Wilcox County | | |
| Sibley | 1 | Turner County | | |
| Sigsbee | 1 | Colquitt County | 31744 | |
| Silco | 1 | Camden County | 31539 | |
| Silica Hills | 1 | Dougherty County | 31705 | |
| Silk Hope | 1 | Chatham County | 31401 | |
| Silk Mills | 1 | Elbert County | 30635 | |
| Siloam | 1 | Greene County | 30665 | |
| Silver City | 2 | Dawson County | 30501 | |
| Silver City | 2 | Dawson County | 30501 | |
| Silver Creek | 1 | Floyd County | 30173 | |
| Silver Hill | 1 | Charlton County | | |
| Silver Hill | 1 | Chattooga County | | |
| Silver Pines | 1 | Bibb County | 31206 | |
| Silvertown | 1 | Upson County | 30286 | |
| Silvertown | 1 | Warren County | | |
| Simpson | 1 | Heard County | 30217 | |
| Simpson Crossroads | 1 | Bartow County | | |
| Singletary | 1 | Early County | | |
| Sirmans | 1 | Clinch County | | |
| Sixes | 1 | Cherokee County | 30114 | |
| Six Flags Over Georgia | 1 | Cobb County | 30001 | |
| Six Mile | 1 | Floyd County | | |
| Skidaway Island | 1 | Chatham County | 31411 | |
| Skidaway Road | 1 | Chatham County | 31404 | |
| Skipperton | 1 | Bibb County | 31206 | |
| Skullhead | 1 | Ware County | | |
| Skyland | 1 | DeKalb County | 30319 | |
| Skyland Terrace | 1 | Chatham County | 31401 | |
| Sky Valley | 1 | Rabun County | 30525 | |
| Slover | 1 | Wayne County | | |
| Smarr | 1 | Monroe County | 31086 | |
| Smiley Crossroads | 1 | Long County | | |
| Smithboro | 1 | Jasper County | | |
| Smithonia | 1 | Oglethorpe County | 30628 | |
| Smiths | 1 | Irwin County | 31776 | |
| Smiths Crossroad | 1 | Troup County | | |
| Smiths Crossroads | 1 | Harris County | 31823 | |
| Smiths Mill | 1 | Troup County | | |
| Smithsonia | 1 | Oglethorpe County | 30628 | |
| Smithville | 2 | Lee County | 31787 | |
| Smithville | 2 | Sumter County | 31787 | |
| Smyrna | 1 | Cobb County | 30080 | 82 |
| Snake Nation | 1 | Fannin County | 30513 | |
| Snapfinger | 1 | DeKalb County | | |
| Snapping Shoals | 1 | Newton County | 30209 | |
| Snead | 1 | Columbia County | 30809 | |
| Snellville | 1 | Gwinnett County | 30278 | |
| Snelsons Crossroads | 1 | Meriwether County | | |
| Snipesville | 1 | Jeff Davis County | 31532 | |
| Snows Mill | 1 | Walton County | | |
| Snow Spring | 1 | Dooly County | | |
| Snow Springs | 1 | Bartow County | | |
| Soapstick | 1 | Gordon County | | |
| Social Circle | 2 | Newton County | 30279 | |
| Social Circle | 2 | Walton County | 30279 | |
| Sofkee | 1 | Bibb County | 31206 | |
| Somerset Park | 1 | Chatham County | 31406 | |
| Sonoraville | 1 | Gordon County | 30701 | |
| Soperton | 1 | Treutlen County | 30457 | |
| South Albany | 1 | Dougherty County | | |
| South Americus | 1 | Sumter County | | |
| South Atlanta | 1 | Fulton County | | |
| South Base | 1 | Houston County | 31098 | |
| South Canton | 1 | Cherokee County | | |
| South Cobb | 1 | Cobb County | 30001 | |
| South Columbus | 1 | Muscogee County | | |
| South Decatur | 1 | DeKalb County | 30034 | |
| Southern Junction | 1 | Glynn County | | |
| Southern Tech | 1 | Cobb County | 30060 | |
| South Georgia State College | 1 | Coffee County | | |
| South Kirkwood | 1 | DeKalb County | | |
| South Macon | 1 | Bibb County | 31206 | |
| South Moultrie | 1 | Colquitt County | 31768 | |
| South Nellieville | 1 | Richmond County | 30901 | |
| South Newport | 1 | McIntosh County | 31323 | |
| Southover | 1 | Chatham County | 31405 | |
| South Pooler | 1 | Chatham County | | |
| South Rossville | 1 | Walker County | 30741 | |
| Southside | 1 | Chatham County | 31419 | |
| South Thompson | 1 | Toombs County | | |
| South Tifton | 1 | Tift County | | |
| South Valdosta | 1 | Lowndes County | | |
| Southward | 1 | Bryan County | | |
| Spain | 1 | Brooks County | | |
| Spalding | 1 | Macon County | | |
| Spann | 1 | Johnson County | 31096 | |
| Sparks | 1 | Cook County | 31647 | |
| Sparks | 1 | Washington County | | |
| Sparks Mill | 1 | Fannin County | | |
| Sparta | 1 | Hancock County | 31087 | |
| Spence | 1 | Grady County | 31779 | |
| Spencer Hills | 1 | Walker County | 30741 | |
| Spilo | 1 | Union County | 30512 | |
| Split Silk | 1 | Walton County | 30249 | |
| Spooner | 1 | Clinch County | | |
| Spout Spring Crossroads | 1 | Hall County | 30542 | |
| Spring Bluff | 1 | Camden County | 31565 | |
| Spring Branch | 1 | Appling County | | |
| Springfield | 1 | Effingham County | 31329 | |
| Springfield | 1 | Hancock County | | |
| Springfield | 1 | Taliaferro County | | |
| Spring Hill | 1 | Wheeler County | | |
| Spring Place | 1 | Murray County | 30705 | |
| Springvale | 1 | Randolph County | 31767 | |
| Springvale | 1 | Randolph County | 31788 | |
| Spring View Acres | 1 | Hall County | | |
| Sprite | 1 | Chattooga County | | |
| Stafford | 1 | Camden County | | |
| Stalco | 1 | Screven County | | |
| Staley Heights | 1 | Chatham County | | |
| Stallings Crossroad | 1 | Coweta County | | |
| Standleys Store | 1 | Clay County | 31751 | |
| Stanfordville | 1 | Putnam County | | |
| Stanley Mill | 1 | Gilmer County | | |
| Stanleys Store | 1 | Toombs County | 30436 | |
| Stapleton | 1 | Jefferson County | 30823 | |
| Stapletons Crossroads | 1 | Jefferson County | | |
| Stark | 1 | Butts County | 30233 | |
| Starksville | 1 | Lee County | | |
| Starling Ford | 1 | Echols County | | |
| Star Point | 1 | Carroll County | | |
| Starr Farm | 1 | Lee County | | |
| Starr's Mill | 1 | Fayette County | 30214 | |
| Starrsville | 1 | Newton County | 30209 | |
| Staten | 1 | Lowndes County | | |
| Statenville | 1 | Echols County | 31648 | |
| State Sanitarium | 1 | Baldwin County | 31061 | |
| Statesboro | 1 | Bulloch County | 30458 | |
| Statesboro Bomb Scoring Site | 1 | Bulloch County | 30458 | |
| Statesville | 1 | Echols County | | |
| Statham | 1 | Barrow County | 30666 | |
| Statham Shoals | 1 | Wilcox County | | |
| Staunton | 1 | Cook County | | |
| Steadman | 1 | Haralson County | 30176 | |
| Steam Mill | 1 | Seminole County | | |
| Steeles Mill | 1 | Spalding County | | |
| Stellaville | 1 | Jefferson County | 30833 | |
| Stephens | 1 | Oglethorpe County | 30667 | |
| Stephensville | 1 | Dade County | 30752 | |
| Sterling | 1 | Glynn County | 31520 | |
| Stevens Pottery | 1 | Baldwin County | 31031 | |
| Stewart | 1 | Newton County | 30209 | |
| Stewart Mill | 1 | Fannin County | | |
| Stewart Town | 1 | Dade County | | |
| Stewartville | 1 | Lamar County | 30295 | |
| Stilesboro | 1 | Bartow County | 30120 | |
| Stillmore | 1 | Emanuel County | 30464 | |
| Stillwell | 1 | Effingham County | 31329 | |
| Stilson | 1 | Bulloch County | 30415 | |
| Stockbridge | 1 | Henry County | 30281 | |
| Stock Hill | 1 | Fannin County | | |
| Stocks | 1 | Lee County | 31763 | |
| Stockton | 1 | Lanier County | 31649 | |
| Stokesville | 1 | Atkinson County | | |
| Stokesville | 1 | Charlton County | | |
| Stoneham | 1 | Jackson County | | |
| Stone Mountain | 1 | DeKalb County | 30083 | 88 |
| Stones Crossroads | 1 | McDuffie County | | |
| Stonewall | 1 | Fulton County | 30282 | |
| Stoney Point | 1 | Carroll County | 30170 | |
| Stop | 1 | Fayette County | | |
| Stovall | 1 | Habersham County | 30531 | |
| Stovall | 1 | Meriwether County | 30222 | |
| Stovall Mill | 1 | White County | | |
| Stratford | 1 | Fulton County | | |
| Strouds | 1 | Monroe County | | |
| Stuckey | 1 | Wheeler County | 30428 | |
| Subligna | 1 | Chattooga County | 30747 | |
| Suches | 1 | Union County | 30572 | |
| Sudie | 1 | Paulding County | 30132 | |
| Sugar Creek | 1 | Fannin County | | |
| Sugar Hill | 1 | Gwinnett County | 30518 | |
| Sugar Hill | 1 | Hall County | 30501 | |
| Sugartown | 1 | Catoosa County | 30755 | |
| Sugar Valley | 1 | Gordon County | 30746 | |
| Sulphur Springs | 1 | Dade County | 30738 | |
| Sulphur Springs Station | 1 | Dade County | | |
| Sumac | 1 | Murray County | 30705 | |
| Summertown | 1 | Emanuel County | 30466 | |
| Summerville | 1 | Chattooga County | 30747 | |
| Summit | 1 | Emanuel County | 30471 | |
| Summit Hill | 1 | Catoosa County | | |
| Sumner | 1 | Worth County | 31789 | |
| Sumter | 1 | Sumter County | 31709 | |
| Sunbury | 1 | Liberty County | 31320 | |
| Sun Hill | 1 | Washington County | | |
| Sun Hill | 1 | Wayne County | | |
| Sunlight Park | 1 | Richmond County | 30901 | |
| Sunny Side | 1 | Spalding County | 30284 | |
| Sunnyside | 1 | Spalding County | | |
| Sunnyside | 1 | Ware County | 31501 | |
| Sunset | 1 | Colquitt County | 31768 | |
| Sunset Heights | 1 | Hall County | 30501 | |
| Sunset Park | 1 | Chatham County | | |
| Sunset Terrace | 1 | Muscogee County | | |
| Sunset Village | 1 | Upson County | 30286 | |
| Sunsweet | 1 | Tift County | 31794 | |
| Suomi | 1 | Dodge County | 31011 | |
| Surrency | 1 | Appling County | 31563 | |
| Sutallee | 1 | Cherokee County | 30184 | |
| Suttles Mill | 1 | Walker County | | |
| Suttons Corner | 1 | Clay County | 31746 | |
| Suwanee | 1 | Gwinnett County | 30174 | |
| Swainsboro | 1 | Emanuel County | 30401 | |
| Swan | 1 | Fannin County | | |
| Swan Lake | 1 | Henry County | 30281 | |
| Swanson Mill | 1 | Catoosa County | | |
| Sweden | 1 | Pickens County | | |
| Sweet Gum | 1 | Fannin County | | |
| Swords | 1 | Morgan County | 30625 | |
| Sybert | 1 | Lincoln County | 30817 | |
| Sycamore | 1 | Turner County | 31790 | |
| Sylvan Hills | 1 | Fulton County | | |
| Sylvania | 1 | Screven County | 30467 | |
| Sylvester | 1 | Worth County | 31791 | |
| Sylvester Drive | 1 | Colquitt County | 31768 | |
| Tabernacle | 1 | Washington County | | |
| Tahoma | 1 | Richmond County | | |
| Tails Creek | 1 | Gilmer County | | |
| Talbotton | 1 | Talbot County | 31827 | |
| Talking Rock | 1 | Pickens County | 30175 | |
| Tallahassee | 1 | Jeff Davis County | | |
| Tallapoosa | 1 | Haralson County | 30176 | |
| Tallulah Falls | 2 | Habersham County | 30573 | |
| Tallulah Falls | 2 | Rabun County | 30573 | |
| Talmadge | 1 | Pickens County | | |
| Talmo | 1 | Jackson County | 30575 | |
| Talmo | 1 | Ware County | | |
| Talona | 1 | Gilmer County | 30186 | |
| Tama Indian Reservation | 1 | Grady County | | |
| Tanner | 1 | Washington County | | |
| Tanner Mill | 1 | Hall County | | |
| Tarboro | 1 | Camden County | 31568 | |
| Tarrytown | 1 | Montgomery County | 30470 | |
| Tarver | 1 | Echols County | 31630 | |
| Tarversville | 1 | Twiggs County | | |
| Tate | 1 | Pickens County | 30177 | |
| Tate City | 1 | Towns County | 30525 | |
| Tattnall Square | 1 | Bibb County | | |
| Tatumsville | 1 | Chatham County | | |
| Tax | 1 | Talbot County | 31826 | |
| Tax Crossroads | 1 | Talbot County | | |
| Taylors Mill | 1 | Peach County | | |
| Taylorsville | 2 | Bartow County | 30178 | |
| Taylorsville | 2 | Polk County | 30178 | |
| Tazewell | 1 | Marion County | 31803 | |
| Teague | 1 | Cherokee County | | |
| Teeterville | 1 | Lanier County | | |
| Telfair Junction | 1 | Chatham County | | |
| Telfair Woods | 1 | Burke County | | |
| Tell | 1 | Fulton County | | |
| Teloga | 1 | Chattooga County | 30747 | |
| Temperance | 1 | Telfair County | 31077 | |
| Temperance Bell | 1 | Greene County | | |
| Temple | 2 | Carroll County | 30179 | |
| Temple | 2 | Haralson County | 30179 | |
| Temple Grove | 1 | Murray County | | |
| Tempy | 1 | Worth County | | |
| Tennga | 1 | Murray County | 30751 | |
| Tennille | 1 | Washington County | 31089 | |
| Terra Cotta | 1 | Bibb County | | |
| Terrell | 1 | Worth County | 31789 | |
| Terry | 1 | Paulding County | | |
| Tetlow | 1 | Wayne County | | |
| Texas | 1 | Heard County | 30217 | |
| Thalean | 1 | Sumter County | | |
| Thalmann | 1 | Glynn County | 31520 | |
| The Hill | 1 | Richmond County | 30904 | |
| Thelma | 1 | Clinch County | | |
| The Rock | 1 | Upson County | 30285 | |
| Thirteen Forks | 1 | Elbert County | | |
| Thomasboro | 1 | Screven County | 30455 | |
| Thomas Crossroads | 1 | Coweta County | | |
| Thomas Mill | 1 | Union County | | |
| Thomaston | 1 | Upson County | 30286 | |
| Thomasville | 1 | Fulton County | | |
| Thomasville | 1 | Thomas County | 31792 | |
| Thompson Crossroad | 1 | Meriwether County | | |
| Thompsons Mill | 1 | Barrow County | | |
| Thompsons Mills | 1 | Jackson County | 30548 | |
| Thompsonville | 1 | Walker County | | |
| Thomson | 1 | McDuffie County | 30824 | |
| Three Forks | 1 | Fannin County | | |
| Three Forks | 1 | Rabun County | | |
| Three Points | 1 | Emanuel County | | |
| Three Points | 1 | Ware County | | |
| Thrift | 1 | Jenkins County | 30442 | |
| Thunder | 1 | Upson County | 30258 | |
| Thunderbolt | 1 | Chatham County | 31404 | |
| Thurston | 1 | Greene County | 30642 | |
| Thyatira | 1 | Jackson County | 30549 | |
| Tickanetley | 1 | Gilmer County | | |
| Ticknor | 1 | Colquitt County | 31744 | |
| Tidings | 1 | Chattooga County | | |
| Tifton | 1 | Tift County | 31794 | |
| Tiger | 1 | Rabun County | 30576 | |
| Tignall | 1 | Wilkes County | 30668 | |
| Tilford | 1 | Fulton County | | |
| Tillman | 1 | Lowndes County | | |
| Tilton | 1 | Whitfield County | 30720 | |
| Timothy | 1 | Clarke County | 30601 | |
| Tioga | 1 | Gilmer County | | |
| Tippetts | 1 | Pulaski County | | |
| Tippettville | 1 | Dooly County | 31092 | |
| Tippetville | 1 | Dooly County | | |
| Tison | 1 | Tattnall County | 30427 | |
| Titus | 1 | Towns County | 30546 | |
| Toccoa | 1 | Stephens County | 30577 | |
| Toccoa Falls | 1 | Stephens County | 30598 | |
| Toco Hills | 1 | DeKalb County | 30329 | |
| Toledo | 1 | Charlton County | 31646 | |
| Tom | 1 | Johnson County | 31049 | |
| Tompkins | 1 | Camden County | | |
| Toms Creek | 1 | Stephens County | 30557 | |
| Toombs Central | 1 | Toombs County | | |
| Toomsboro | 1 | Wilkinson County | 31090 | |
| Toonigh | 1 | Cherokee County | | |
| Toonnerville | 1 | Whitfield County | | |
| Topeka Junction | 1 | Upson County | 30285 | |
| Torbit | 1 | Burke County | | |
| Tournapull | 1 | Stephens County | | |
| Towalaga | 1 | Spalding County | | |
| Town and Country Acres | 1 | Dougherty County | 31707 | |
| Town Creek | 1 | Union County | | |
| Towns | 1 | Telfair County | 31055 | |
| Townsend | 1 | McIntosh County | 31331 | |
| Townsend Mill | 1 | Union County | | |
| Traders Hill | 1 | Charlton County | 31539 | |
| Traisville | 1 | Clinch County | | |
| Trans | 1 | Walker County | 30728 | |
| Travisville | 1 | Clinch County | | |
| Tremont | 1 | Richmond County | 30907 | |
| Tremont Park | 1 | Chatham County | 31401 | |
| Trenton | 1 | Dade County | 30752 | |
| Trice | 1 | Upson County | 30286 | |
| Trickem | 1 | Gwinnett County | | |
| Trickum | 1 | Whitfield County | 30755 | |
| Tri-Counties Industrial City | 1 | Gordon County | | |
| Tricum | 1 | Gwinnett County | | |
| Trimble | 1 | Troup County | 30230 | |
| Trinity | 1 | Liberty County | | |
| Trion | 1 | Chattooga County | 30753 | |
| Troupville | 1 | Lowndes County | 31601 | |
| Troutman | 1 | Stewart County | 31721 | |
| Truckers | 1 | Bulloch County | | |
| Trudie | 1 | Brantley County | 31557 | |
| Tucker | 1 | DeKalb County | 30084 | |
| Tuckers Crossroad | 1 | Laurens County | | |
| Tugalo | 1 | Stephens County | 30577 | |
| Tugaloo | 1 | Habersham County | 30573 | |
| Tunis | 1 | Henry County | | |
| Tunnel Hill | 1 | Whitfield County | 30755 | |
| Turin | 1 | Coweta County | 30289 | |
| Turman | 1 | Calhoun County | | |
| Turner City | 1 | Dougherty County | | |
| Turner Lake Ford | 1 | Irwin County | | |
| Turners Corner | 1 | Lumpkin County | | |
| Turners Rock | 1 | Chatham County | 31404 | |
| Turnerville | 1 | Habersham County | 30580 | |
| Turntime Crossroads | 1 | Harris County | | |
| Turpin Hill | 1 | Richmond County | | |
| Tusculum | 1 | Effingham County | 31329 | |
| Tuxedo | 1 | Fulton County | 30342 | |
| Twin City | 1 | Emanuel County | 30471 | |
| Twin Lakes | 1 | Lowndes County | 31605 | |
| Tybee Island | 1 | Chatham County | 31328 | |
| Tyrone | 1 | Fayette County | 30290 | |
| Tyrone | 1 | Wilkes County | 30673 | |
| Ty Ty | 1 | Tift County | 31795 | |
| Tyus | 1 | Carroll County | 30108 | |
| Unadilla | 1 | Dooly County | 31091 | |
| Underwood | 1 | Baldwin County | | |
| Undine | 1 | Evans County | | |
| Union | 1 | Candler County | | |
| Union | 1 | Dade County | | |
| Union | 1 | Dodge County | | |
| Union | 1 | Fannin County | | |
| Union | 1 | Marion County | 31803 | |
| Union | 1 | Paulding County | 30179 | |
| Union | 1 | Quitman County | 31754 | |
| Union | 1 | Stewart County | 31821 | |
| Unionburg | 1 | Tift County | 31794 | |
| Union City | 1 | Fulton County | 30291 | |
| Union Hill | 1 | Cherokee County | 30201 | |
| Union Hill | 1 | Stephens County | | |
| Union Junction | 1 | Chatham County | | |
| Union Point | 1 | Greene County | 30669 | |
| Union Point | 1 | Whitfield County | | |
| Unionville | 1 | Bibb County | | |
| Unionville | 1 | Lamar County | 30204 | |
| Unionville | 1 | Tift County | 31794 | |
| Unity | 1 | Franklin County | 30521 | |
| University | 1 | Bibb County | 31207 | |
| University of Georgia | 1 | Clarke County | | |
| Univeter | 1 | Cherokee County | | |
| Upatoi | 1 | Muscogee County | 31829 | |
| Upper Bradley Place | 1 | Stewart County | | |
| Upton | 1 | Coffee County | 31533 | |
| Upton Mill | 1 | Taylor County | 31006 | |
| Uptonville | 1 | Charlton County | 31539 | |
| Uvalda | 1 | Montgomery County | 30473 | |
| Vada | 2 | Calhoun County | 31734 | |
| Vada | 2 | Mitchell County | 31734 | |
| Valdosta | 1 | Lowndes County | 31601 | 04 |
| Valdosta Municipal Airport | 1 | Lowndes County | 31601 | |
| Valley View | 1 | Walker County | 37409 | |
| Valona | 1 | McIntosh County | 31332 | |
| Vanceville | 1 | Tift County | | |
| Vandiver | 1 | Franklin County | | |
| Vandiver Heights | 1 | Cobb County | 30060 | |
| Vanna | 1 | Hart County | 30662 | |
| Vans Valley | 1 | Floyd County | 30161 | |
| Van Wert | 1 | Polk County | 30153 | |
| Varnell | 1 | Whitfield County | 30756 | |
| Vaughn | 1 | Spalding County | 30223 | |
| Veal | 1 | Carroll County | 30108 | |
| Veazey | 1 | Greene County | 30642 | |
| Vega | 1 | Pike County | 30256 | |
| Veribest | 1 | Oglethorpe County | 30627 | |
| Vernon | 1 | Troup County | | |
| Vernonburg | 1 | Chatham County | 31406 | |
| Vernon View | 1 | Chatham County | 31406 | |
| Vessels Ford | 1 | Clinch County | | |
| Vesta | 1 | Oglethorpe County | 30627 | |
| Veterans Hospital | 1 | Richmond County | 30904 | |
| Victoria | 1 | Cherokee County | 30188 | |
| Victory | 1 | Carroll County | 30108 | |
| Victory Heights | 1 | Chatham County | | |
| Vidalia | 2 | Montgomery County | 30474 | |
| Vidalia | 2 | Toombs County | 30474 | |
| Vidette | 1 | Burke County | 30434 | |
| Vienna | 1 | Dooly County | 31092 | |
| View | 1 | Habersham County | 30531 | |
| Villanow | 1 | Walker County | 30728 | |
| Villa Rica | 2 | Carroll County | 30180 | |
| Villa Rica | 2 | Douglas County | 30180 | |
| Vincent | 1 | Laurens County | | |
| Vineville | 1 | Bibb County | | |
| Vineyard Crossroads | 1 | Coweta County | | |
| Vinings | 1 | Cobb County | 30080 | |
| Vinson Village | 1 | Bibb County | | |
| Viola | 1 | Heard County | | |
| Vista-Grove | 1 | DeKalb County | 30033 | |
| Vista Terrace | 1 | Muscogee County | | |
| Vogel | 1 | Clinch County | | |
| Vulcan | 1 | Walker County | 30738 | |
| Waco | 1 | Haralson County | 30182 | |
| Wades | 1 | Randolph County | | |
| Wadley | 1 | Jefferson County | 30477 | |
| Wagon Wheel | 1 | Cook County | | |
| Wahoma | 1 | Ware County | | |
| Wahoo | 1 | Lumpkin County | 30533 | |
| Walden | 1 | Bibb County | 31206 | |
| Waleska | 1 | Cherokee County | 30183 | |
| Walker | 1 | Dougherty County | | |
| Walker Correctional Institute | 1 | Walker County | 30728 | |
| Walker Ford | 1 | Irwin County | | |
| Walker Mill | 1 | Spalding County | | |
| Walker Park | 1 | Walton County | 30655 | |
| Walkersville | 1 | Pierce County | | |
| Walkinshaw | 1 | Richmond County | | |
| Wallace | 1 | Pulaski County | 31036 | |
| Wallaces Mill | 1 | DeKalb County | | |
| Wallaceville | 1 | Walker County | 30741 | |
| Walls Crossing | 1 | Schley County | 31806 | |
| Walnut Grove | 1 | Walker County | 30728 | |
| Walnutgrove | 1 | Walton County | 30209 | |
| Walnut Grove | 1 | Walton County | 30209 | |
| Waltertown | 1 | Ware County | | |
| Walthourville | 1 | Liberty County | 31333 | |
| Wanona Park | 1 | Ware County | | |
| Wansley | 1 | Carroll County | | |
| Wareco | 1 | Ware County | | |
| Ware Correctional Institute | 1 | Ware County | 31501 | |
| Waresboro | 1 | Ware County | 31564 | |
| Wares Crossroads | 1 | Troup County | 30240 | |
| Waresville | 1 | Heard County | 30217 | |
| Warfield | 1 | Putnam County | | |
| Waring | 1 | Whitfield County | 30720 | |
| Warm Springs | 1 | Meriwether County | 31830 | |
| Warner Robins | 2 | Houston County | 31088 | |
| Warner Robins | 2 | Peach County | 31088 | |
| Warren | 1 | Warren County | | |
| Warren Terrace | 1 | Walker County | 30741 | |
| Warrenton | 1 | Warren County | 30828 | |
| Warsaw | 1 | Fulton County | 30201 | |
| Warsaw | 1 | McIntosh County | | |
| Warthen | 1 | Washington County | 31094 | |
| Warwick | 1 | Worth County | 31796 | |
| Warwoman Dell | 1 | Rabun County | | |
| Washington | 1 | Wilkes County | 30673 | |
| Waterloo | 1 | Irwin County | 31733 | |
| Waterport | 1 | Walton County | 30249 | |
| Watkinsville | 1 | Oconee County | 30677 | |
| Watson Crossroads | 1 | Clay County | | |
| Waverly | 1 | Camden County | 31565 | |
| Waverly Hall | 1 | Harris County | 31831 | |
| Waverly Park | 1 | Catoosa County | 30741 | |
| Wax | 1 | Floyd County | 30104 | |
| Wayback | 1 | Calhoun County | 31746 | |
| Waycross | 2 | Pierce County | 31501 | |
| Waycross | 2 | Ware County | 31501 | |
| Waycross-Ware County Airport | 1 | Ware County | | |
| Waynesboro | 1 | Burke County | 30830 | |
| Waynesville | 1 | Brantley County | 31566 | |
| Wayside | 1 | Jones County | 31032 | |
| Weaver | 1 | Pike County | 30295 | |
| Webb | 1 | Fulton County | 30201 | |
| Weber | 1 | Berrien County | 31639 | |
| Wefanie | 1 | Long County | | |
| Welcome | 1 | Coweta County | 30263 | |
| Welcome Hill | 1 | Chattooga County | 30753 | |
| Wells Mills | 1 | Lee County | | |
| Wenona | 1 | Crisp County | 31015 | |
| Weracoba Heights | 1 | Muscogee County | | |
| Wesley | 1 | Emanuel County | 30401 | |
| Wesley | 1 | Taylor County | 31812 | |
| Wesleyan | 1 | Bibb County | 31201 | |
| Wesleyan College | 1 | Bibb County | 31201 | |
| Wesleyan Estates | 1 | Bibb County | 31204 | |
| Wesleyan Woods | 1 | Bibb County | | |
| West Augusta | 1 | Richmond County | 30901 | |
| West Bainbridge | 1 | Decatur County | 31717 | |
| West Bremen | 1 | Haralson County | | |
| Westbrook | 1 | Pickens County | | |
| West Brow | 1 | Dade County | 30738 | |
| West Camilla | 1 | Mitchell County | | |
| West Cedartown | 1 | Polk County | | |
| West Cordele | 1 | Crisp County | 31015 | |
| West Crossing | 1 | Haralson County | 30176 | |
| West Dawson | 1 | Terrell County | | |
| West Dublin | 1 | Laurens County | 31021 | |
| West End | 1 | Floyd County | 30161 | |
| West End | 1 | Fulton County | 30310 | |
| Wester | 1 | Elbert County | 30635 | |
| Westfield | 1 | Bibb County | | |
| Westgate | 1 | Dougherty County | | |
| Westgate Park | 1 | Clarke County | 30601 | |
| West Georgia College | 1 | Carroll County | 30117 | |
| West Green | 1 | Coffee County | 31567 | |
| West Highlands | 1 | Bibb County | | |
| Westlake | 1 | Twiggs County | | |
| West Newnan | 1 | Coweta County | | |
| Westoak | 1 | Cobb County | 30060 | |
| Weston | 1 | Webster County | 31832 | |
| Westover | 1 | Richmond County | | |
| West Point | 2 | Harris County | 31833 | |
| West Point | 2 | Troup County | 31833 | |
| West Rome | 1 | Floyd County | | |
| West Savannah | 1 | Chatham County | | |
| Westside | 1 | Catoosa County | 30741 | |
| Westside | 1 | Hall County | 30501 | |
| West Summerville | 1 | Chattooga County | | |
| West Valdosta | 1 | Lowndes County | | |
| West Vidalia | 1 | Toombs County | 30474 | |
| Westwick | 1 | Richmond County | | |
| Westwood | 1 | Ben Hill County | 31750 | |
| Whaleys | 1 | Wayne County | | |
| Wheat Hill | 1 | Chatham County | 31408 | |
| Wheeler Heights | 1 | Bibb County | 31201 | |
| Wheless | 1 | Richmond County | | |
| Whigham | 1 | Grady County | 31797 | |
| Whispering Pines | 1 | Heard County | | |
| Whistleville | 1 | Barrow County | 30680 | |
| White | 1 | Bartow County | 30184 | |
| White Bluff | 1 | Chatham County | 31406 | |
| White City | 1 | Cherokee County | | |
| White City | 1 | Douglas County | | |
| White Hall | 1 | Clarke County | 30601 | |
| Whitehall | 1 | Clarke County | 30601 | |
| White Hill | 1 | Screven County | | |
| Whitehouse | 1 | Henry County | 30253 | |
| Whitemarsh Island | 1 | Chatham County | 31404 | |
| White Oak | 1 | Camden County | 31568 | |
| White Path | 1 | Gilmer County | | |
| White Plains | 1 | Greene County | 30678 | |
| Whitesburg | 1 | Carroll County | 30185 | |
| Whitestone | 2 | Gilmer County | 30186 | |
| Whitestone | 2 | Pickens County | 30186 | |
| White Sulphur | 1 | Hall County | 30501 | |
| White Sulphur Springs | 1 | Meriwether County | 31822 | |
| Whitesville | 1 | Harris County | 31833 | |
| Whitfield | 1 | Troup County | | |
| Whitney | 1 | Walton County | | |
| Whitworth | 1 | Franklin County | 30553 | |
| Wiggins | 1 | Ben Hill County | | |
| Wildwood | 1 | Dade County | 30757 | |
| Wiley | 1 | Rabun County | 30581 | |
| Willacoochee | 1 | Atkinson County | 31650 | |
| Willard | 1 | Putnam County | 31024 | |
| Willett | 1 | Muscogee County | | |
| William P Hartsfield Atlanta International Airport | 2 | Clayton County | 30320 | |
| William P Hartsfield Atlanta International Airport | 2 | Fulton County | 30320 | |
| Williams | 1 | Chatham County | | |
| Williamsburg | 1 | Calhoun County | | |
| Williamsburg | 1 | Clinch County | | |
| Williamsburg | 1 | Dougherty County | | |
| Williamson | 1 | Pike County | 30292 | |
| Williams Plaza | 1 | Houston County | 31093 | |
| Willie | 1 | Liberty County | | |
| Willingham | 1 | Worth County | | |
| Willis Plaza | 1 | Muscogee County | | |
| Wilmington | 1 | Chatham County | | |
| Wilmington Island | 1 | Chatham County | 31410 | |
| Wilmington Park | 1 | Chatham County | | |
| Wilshire | 1 | Chatham County | 31406 | |
| Wilshire Estates | 1 | Chatham County | 31406 | |
| Wilson | 1 | Peach County | | |
| Wilson Airport | 1 | Bibb County | 31201 | |
| Wilson Mill | 1 | Fannin County | | |
| Wilsons Church | 1 | Jackson County | 30529 | |
| Wilsonville | 1 | Coffee County | 31554 | |
| Wimbish Wood | 1 | Bibb County | | |
| Winchester | 1 | Macon County | 31057 | |
| Winder | 1 | Barrow County | 30680 | |
| Windsor | 1 | Walton County | 30249 | |
| Windsor Estates | 1 | Coweta County | 30263 | |
| Windsor Forest | 1 | Chatham County | 31406 | |
| Windsor Park | 1 | Muscogee County | 31904 | |
| Windsor Spring | 1 | Richmond County | | |
| Windward | 1 | Chatham County | 31405 | |
| Windy Ridge | 1 | Fannin County | 30559 | |
| Winfield | 1 | Columbia County | 30824 | |
| Winfield Hill | 1 | Columbia County | | |
| Winokur | 1 | Charlton County | 31539 | |
| Winona Park | 1 | Ware County | 31501 | |
| Winston | 1 | Douglas County | 30187 | |
| Winterville | 1 | Clarke County | 30683 | |
| Wire Bridge | 1 | Quitman County | | |
| Withers | 1 | Clinch County | 31630 | |
| Wofford Crossroads | 1 | Bartow County | 30184 | |
| Woodacre | 1 | Mitchell County | | |
| Woodbine | 1 | Camden County | 31569 | |
| Woodbury | 1 | Meriwether County | 30293 | |
| Woodcliff | 1 | Screven County | 30467 | |
| Woodfin Mill | 1 | Lamar County | | |
| Woodland | 1 | Talbot County | 31836 | |
| Woodland Hills | 1 | Laurens County | 31021 | |
| Woodland Hills | 1 | Walker County | 30741 | |
| Woodlawn | 1 | Lincoln County | | |
| Woodlawn Estates | 1 | Muscogee County | | |
| Woodlawn Terrace | 1 | Chatham County | 31401 | |
| Woods Grove | 1 | Towns County | 30582 | |
| Woods Station | 1 | Catoosa County | 30736 | |
| Woodstock | 1 | Cherokee County | 30188 | |
| Woodville | 1 | Chatham County | 31401 | |
| Woodville | 1 | Greene County | 30670 | |
| Woolsey | 1 | Fayette County | 30214 | |
| Wooster | 1 | Meriwether County | 30218 | |
| Workmore | 1 | Telfair County | | |
| Worley Crossroads | 1 | Cherokee County | | |
| Wormsloe | 1 | Chatham County | 31406 | |
| Worth | 1 | Turner County | 31714 | |
| Worthville | 1 | Butts County | 30233 | |
| Wray | 1 | Irwin County | 31798 | |
| Wrayswood | 1 | Greene County | | |
| Wrens | 1 | Jefferson County | 30833 | |
| Wright Mill | 1 | Fannin County | | |
| Wrightsboro | 1 | McDuffie County | | |
| Wright Square | 1 | Chatham County | 31412 | |
| Wrightsville | 1 | Johnson County | 31096 | |
| Wriley | 1 | Wilkinson County | | |
| Wymberley | 1 | Chatham County | 31406 | |
| Wynnton | 1 | Muscogee County | 31906 | |
| Yahoola | 1 | Lumpkin County | 30533 | |
| Yarbroughs Mill | 1 | Gordon County | | |
| Yates | 1 | Coweta County | 30263 | |
| Yates Crossroads | 1 | Heard County | 30217 | |
| Yatesville | 1 | Upson County | 31097 | |
| Yellow Bluff Fishing Village | 1 | Liberty County | 31320 | |
| Yellow Dirt | 1 | Heard County | 30217 | |
| Yeomans | 1 | Terrell County | 31742 | |
| Yonah | 1 | Hall County | 30510 | |
| Yonkers | 1 | Dodge County | 31014 | |
| York | 1 | Rabun County | | |
| Yorkville | 1 | Paulding County | 30132 | |
| Youley | 1 | Jenkins County | | |
| Youngcane | 1 | Union County | 30512 | |
| Young Harris | 1 | Towns County | 30582 | |
| Youngs | 1 | Polk County | 30125 | |
| Youngstown | 1 | Union County | 30512 | |
| Youth | 1 | Walton County | 30249 | |
| Ypsilanti | 1 | Talbot County | | |
| Yukon | 1 | Gilmer County | | |
| Zaidee | 1 | Treutlen County | 30457 | |
| Zebina | 1 | Jefferson County | 30833 | |
| Zebulon | 1 | Hancock County | | |
| Zebulon | 1 | Pike County | 30295 | |
| Zeigler | 1 | Screven County | | |
| Zelobee | 1 | Marion County | | |
| Zenith | 1 | Crawford County | 31078 | |
| Zetella | 1 | Spalding County | 30223 | |
| Zetto | 1 | Clay County | 31724 | |
| Zingara | 1 | Rockdale County | 30207 | |
| Zion | 1 | Appling County | | |
| Zuta | 1 | Glynn County | | |
