= Shingler =

Shingler is a surname. Notable people with the surname include:

- Aaron Shingler (born 1987), British rugby union player and former cricketer
- Arthur Shingler (1876–1958), South African cricketer
- Helen Shingler (1919–2019), British film and television actress
- Nick Shingler (born 1959), British cartoonist, illustrator and building surveyor
- Steven Shingler (born 1991), British rugby union player

== See also ==
- Shingler, Georgia
- Shingle weaver
