= Yonkers (disambiguation) =

Yonkers is a city in the state of New York.

Yonkers may also refer to:

- Yonkers station, a railroad station that serves the downtown area of Yonkers, New York
- Yonkers F.C., an early twentieth century amateur U.S. soccer team
- Yonkers, Georgia, an unincorporated community
- "Yonkers" (song), by Tyler, The Creator from Goblin, 2011

== See also ==
- Yonkers High School
- Michael Yonkers, an American rock musician
- Terry A. Yonkers, United States Assistant Secretary of the Air Force
- Younkers, a former chain of department stores
- Lost in Yonkers, a play set in Brooklyn
