= List of places in Georgia =

List of places in Georgia may refer to:

- List of places in Georgia (U.S. state)
  - List of places in Georgia (U.S. state) (A–D)
  - List of places in Georgia (U.S. state) (E–H)
  - List of places in Georgia (U.S. state) (I–R)
  - List of places in Georgia (U.S. state) (S–Z)
- List of places in Georgia (country)
  - Administrative divisions of Georgia (country)
  - List of cities and towns in Georgia (country)
  - List of municipalities in Georgia (country)

== See also ==
- List of Georgia (U.S. state) locations by per capita income
