= Bituminous coal miners' strike =

Bituminous Coal Miners' Strike may refer to any of the following strikes:

- Bituminous Coal Miners' Strike of 1894
- Bituminous Coal Strike of 1974
- Bituminous Coal Strike of 1977-1978
