= Stuckey =

Stuckey may refer to:

- Stuckey, Georgia
- Stuckey, South Carolina
- Stuckey House, a historic home in West Virginia
- Stuckey's, an American roadside convenience store chain
- Stuckey's Bridge, a bridge spanning the Chunky River near Meridian, Mississippi
- Stuckey and Murray, American comedy music duo
- Stuckey (surname)
