= Temperance movement (disambiguation) =

A temperance movement is a social movement urging reduced or prohibited use of alcoholic beverages.

== Temperance movements by country ==
- Australia
- Canada
- India
- Ireland
- New Zealand
- Sri Lanka
- Sweden
- The United Kingdom
- The United States
  - Washingtonian movement

== Temperance movements by religion ==
- Catholic temperance movement
- Woman's Christian Temperance Union

Temperance movement may also refer to:

- The Temperance Movement (band)
  - The Temperance Movement (album)

== See also ==
- Temperance (disambiguation)
- Neo-prohibitionism
