= Temperance =

Temperance may refer to:

== Moderation ==
- Temperance movement, movement to reduce the amount of alcohol consumed
- Temperance (virtue), habitual moderation in the indulgence of a natural appetite or passion

== Culture ==
- Temperance (group), Canadian dance-pop musical group
- Temperance (Tarot card), Major Arcana Tarot card
- Temperance, album by Astrud Gilberto
- Temperance Brennan, fictional character by Kathy Reichs
  - Temperance "Bones" Brennan, fictional character of TV series Bones
- Temperance (Italian band), Italian melodic metal group
  - Temperance (album), 2014 debut album by the Italian band

== Places ==
=== United States ===
- Temperance, Georgia, an unincorporated community
- Temperance Bell, Georgia, an unincorporated community
- Temperance, Michigan, a community
- Temperance Hall, Tennessee, a small community
- Temperance Island, Lake Michigan
- Temperance River, Minnesota

=== Other places ===
- Temperance Vale, New Brunswick, Canada
- Temperance Town, Cardiff, Wales

== See also ==
- Temperance bar, bars of the temperance movement opposed to alcohol
- Temperance (given name)
- Temperance Hall (disambiguation)
