= Talona Mountain =

Mountain in Georgia, United States

Coordinates: 34.630°N 84.491°W

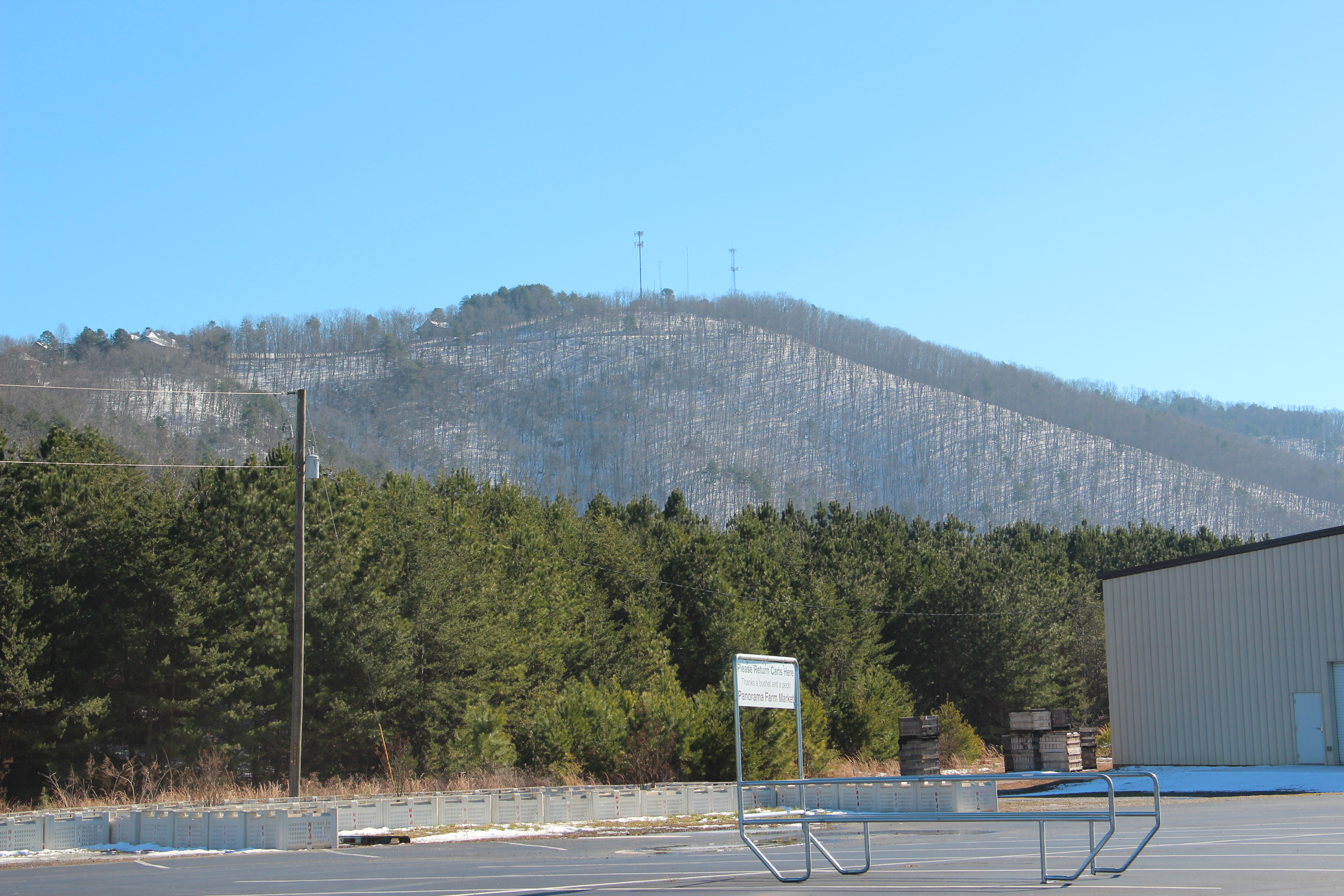
Talona Mountain dusted in snow

Talona Mountain is a summit in the U.S. state of Georgia. The elevation is 2,090 feet (640 m).

Talona Mountain takes its name from the former nearby Cherokee settlement at Talona, Georgia.
