= Deputy Assistant Secretary of the Air Force (Energy) =

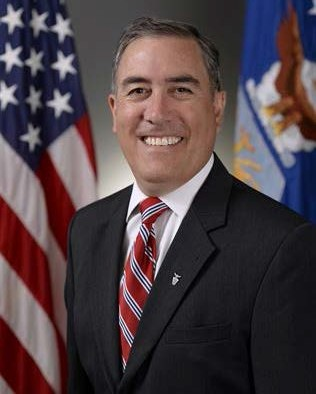
Mr. Roberto I. Guerrero, Deputy Assistant Secretary of the Air Force (Operational Energy)

Deputy Assistant Secretary of the Air Force (Operational Energy) (abbreviated SAF/IEN) is the title of a civilian office in the United States Department of the Air Force, with its main offices at the Pentagon in Arlington, Virginia. SAF/IEN falls under the Assistant Secretary of the United States Air Force for Installations, Environment, and Energy (SAF/IE), and assists the Assistant Secretary of the Air Force, the Under Secretary of the Air Force, and the Secretary of the Air Force in drafting energy policy, supporting optimization initiatives, and championing projects related to operational energy (aviation fuel) across the US Air Force. Established in 2010, SAF/IEN focuses on fuel supply and logistics, aerodynamic drag reduction, propulsion efficiency, software development, optimized planning, and fuel data capture.

Since 2015, Roberto Guerrero has served as the Deputy Assistant Secretary of the Air Force for Operational Energy.

== History ==
Energy conservation in the Air Force dates back to the 1970s and initially focused on installations and facilities. Prior to 1972, the Air Force was converting coal-fired installations to oil or natural gas under a Department of Defense air pollution reduction program. After the Yom Kippur War, the energy crisis of the 1970s prompted the Air Force to identify their first energy reduction goals and monitoring systems. By the late 1970s, the Air Force had developed a 10-year energy reduction plan for its facilities under the Energy Policy and Conservation Act. It also created the first Air Force Energy Office at Tyndall Air Force Base, Florida, which became the focal point for all of the service’s energy matters and policies.

In 1985, the Air Force developed the Energy Information Management System, which was designed to collect all service energy data. Under this system, all Air Force installations were required to conduct energy security assessments every 1 to 3 years.

In response to the Energy Policy Act of 1992, the Air Force set new goals and mandates for utilities, increasing requirements for the use of clean energy, and improving overall energy efficiency. In an effort to achieve these goals, the Air Force began working with private industry to upgrade its facilities. Through Energy Savings Performance Contracts (ESPC), industry made energy efficiency upgrades to facilities and the Air Force paid for them with the cost saved over time. The first of these was implemented at Randolph Air Force Base with Johnson Controls, where 14,500 light fixtures were retrofitted with energy-saving assets.

The 21st Century brought an increased focus on energy conservation in the Air Force. The Undersecretary of the Air Force was designated the senior Air Force Energy Official, a role traditionally reserved for senior Air Force facility engineers. This raised visibility of energy conservation and usage amongst Air Force and Department of Defense leadership.

In 2006, the Air Force conducted the first flight by a military aircraft using a domestic synthetic fuel blend. The test was conducted at Edwards Air Force Base, California in a B-52 Stratofortress, and it culminated in four flights using all eight engines with the synthetic blend for the duration of each.

The following year was a pivotal point in the history of Air Force Energy, beginning with Executive Order 13423 mandating that all Federal agencies operate in an energy-conscious manner.

In 2008 Air Force Policy Memo (AFPM) 10-1 directed the development of an Energy Strategic Plan, designated Roles and Responsibilities, and created a new management structure under the Energy Program Management Office (EPMO) in 2009. The EPMO’s mission was to bring greater visibility to Air Force energy consumption trends and initiatives, and ensure energy was a consideration across Air Force missions. With energy’s quickly growing importance, Air Force leadership determined a broader effort was necessary. As a result, the EPMO became the Office of the Deputy Assistant Secretary of the Air Force (Energy) on 18 November 2010, appointing a Senior Executive Service (SES) as the Deputy Assistant Secretary to lead it, and becoming the first military service to identify energy as a major policy focus area.

== Present day ==
The Office of the Deputy Assistant Secretary of the Air Force (Operational Energy) currently has personnel integrated into Air Force Acquisition Operations, Aviation Operations, Facility Management, Expeditionary Operations, and Logistics. In addition, the Operational Energy Office has established a relationship with the US Department of Energy (DoE), to research future opportunities for integrating alternative fuels into Air Force operations. The office also employs an outreach staff to address energy culture change across the service. Among other achievements, the Air Force Energy Office has led the first-ever pilot project to produce a 100% electric vehicle fleet at Los Angeles Air Force Base, California, directed the inaugural A-10 Warthog flight using a 50-50% blend of alcohol-to-jet (ATJ) and JP-8 fuel, and achieved nearly $1 million in utility cost savings from a new solar panel array at the US Air Force Academy.
