= Tax (disambiguation) =

A tax is a mandatory financial charge or some other type of levy imposed upon a taxpayer (an individual or other legal entity) by a governmental organization in order to fund various public expenditures.

Tax, TAX, or Taxes may also refer to:

- Meredith Tax (1942–2022), American writer and political activist
- Thai AirAsia X (TAX), an airline based in Thailand
- The Adams Express (TAX), a publicly traded diversified equity fund
- Taxol, a chemotherapy medication
- Tax Crossroads, Georgia, a community in the United States
- "Taxes", a 2025 single by Geese from the album Getting Killed

== See also ==
- Taxiing, the movement of an aircraft on the ground
