= UMW Bituminous coal strike of 1977–1978 =

United States coal strike

1977–1978 UMW Bituminous coal strike
- Date: December 6, 1977 - March 19, 1978
- Location: United States

Parties
UMW	Mining Companies

The Bituminous coal strike of 1977–1978 was a 110-day national coal strike in the United States led by the United Mine Workers of America (UMWA). It began December 6, 1977, and ended on March 19, 1978. It is generally considered a successful union strike, although the contract was not beneficial to union members.

Since the 1940s, the UMWA had negotiated a nationwide National Coal Wage Agreement with the Bituminous Coal Operators Association (BCOA), a group of large coal mine operators. The three-year agreements covered national bargaining issues such as wages, health and pension benefits, workplace health and safety, and work rules. Local agreements, far more limited in scope, were negotiated by each individual local affiliate of UMWA.

== Causes of the strike ==
UMWA president Arnold Miller had negotiated the previous collective bargaining agreement during the 1974 UMW Bituminous coal strike.

The right of local unions to strike—not wages—was the primary issue in the negotiations. Low coal prices in the 1930s drove coal operators to cut wages. During the Franklin Roosevelt administration, UMWA and other unions established industry-wide national collective bargaining agreements. In UMWA's case, this meant stripping local unions of the right to strike without the international union's approval. But wildcat strikes had become common in the coal industry. UMWA miners grew frustrated with the terms of national contracts, dispute resolution, and grievances. Democratic reforms within the Mine Workers and the 1974 contract had not released the pressure which caused wildcat strikes. Absent the right to strike, UMWA's democracy movement rejected labor peace and wildcat strikes had become even more common.

Miller had been forced to accept the right to strike over local conditions in order to win re-election in June 1977. When national bargaining talks opened in the fall, Miller therefore insisted on changing the national collective bargaining agreement to give each UMWA affiliate the limited right to strike over local issues. Miller argued that the only way to suppress wildcat strikes was to regulate the process and give local unions the right to strike. With the power that the ability to strike would give local unions, local mine operators would no longer create the conditions which led to strikes. But the owners rejected Miller's demand. They had seen how he was unable to bring wildcat strikers back to the bargaining table and they had little faith that his proposal would work. Instead, they demanded the right to fire wildcat strikers and fine any miner who refused to cross wildcat picket lines.

UMWA's negotiating position was not an enviable one, however. Power utilities had built up a 120-day supply of coal, while iron and steel producers had a 75-day supply. Both were more than sufficient to weather a miners' strike. Additionally, the number of coal mines controlled by UMWA had fallen from 67 percent to 50 percent since 1974, leaving more mines in operation to supply national needs during a strike. The oil crisis which had powered the 1974 round of bargaining no longer existed, and coal demand was lower.

Miller had also hurt himself. He had fired most of his supporters in the intervening three years, including press officer Bernard Aronson, research director Thomas Bethell and most of the research department staff, leaving UMWA organizationally unable to handle the needs of the negotiations and strike. Miller turned to the Stanley H. Ruttenberg Company for negotiating advice and assistance at the bargaining table. This caused confusion among UMWA negotiators as to strategy, tactics and the content of proposals, and caused mixed signals to be sent by the bargaining committee, Miller, and other UMWA officers. The lack of organizational competence and flow of mixed messages helped prolong the labor dispute.

== Strike ==
UMWA struck when the national contract expired on December 6, 1977.

=== Rejection of tentative agreements ===
As the bargaining talks continued in December, sporadic violence broke out. A coal auger was blown up at a mine near Saint Charles, Georgia, a coal train was stopped and delayed in Cambria County, Pennsylvania, and in Utah a state judge issued a 10-day restraining order against the union and 1,100 summonses issued after replacement miners complained of being harassed by picketers. On December 13, state police in riot gear tear-gassed about 400 coal miners in Daviess County, Kentucky, who had thrown rocks and bottles at passing coal trucks. Four weeks into the strike, five union miners were indicted on federal charges for conspiracy in the dynamiting of a section of the Norfolk and Western Railway on which non-union coal was being carried. In Indiana, Gov. Otis Bowen called out the National Guard on February 14 to protect coal truck convoys. In Virginia, Gov. John Dalton declared a state of emergency on March 7 and ordered the state police to begin patrolling coal-producing areas. But Pennsylvania Gov. Milton Shapp and West Virginia Gov. Jay Rockefeller refused to call out the National Guard in their states, and Illinois Gov. James R. Thompson agreed to let his state police officers accompany federal marshals but refused to have them enforce federal labor law.

A tentative agreement was reached on February 6, 1978. The agreement imposed penalties for wildcat strikes and chronic absenteeism, turned the union's health and pension plans over to the employers, forced workers to pay part of their health insurance premiums, and instituted a bonus system for productivity increases.

The union's bargaining council rejected the tentative agreement on February 12.

A second tentative agreement was reached. UMWA's bargaining council approved the pact and sent it to the membership for ratification. The miners deeply resented losing their health care plan and having to pay premiums, and still demand the right to strike over local issues. Miner reaction was highly negative; television stations ran images of miners burning the contract during meetings. To help sell the agreement, UMWA spent $40,000 on television and radio advertising. But UMWA members resented having their own union spend dues money on propaganda, and felt that the ad campaign showed that the contract was not worth ratifying. Miller's decision to use advertising to sell the contract backfired; the contract vote became as much a referendum on Miller's leadership as it was about the tentative agreement.

During three days of voting from March 3 to March 5, the UMWA membership rejected the tentative contract by margin of 2 to 1.

=== Taft-Hartley and changing attitudes ===
On March 6, President Jimmy Carter invoked the national emergency provision of the Taft-Hartley Act. An investigatory commission met on March 7, and held hearings at which both union and management witnesses testified. The commission's report was issued the following day, and a federal district court issued a temporary injunction ordering the miners back to work on March 9.

The striking miners ignored the injunction. The federal government did little to enforce the order.

On March 19, Carter asked the district court to make the injunction permanent. But noting that there seemed little national emergency, and observing that the Carter administration had made little effort to reopen the mines, the court declined to make the injunction permanent. The temporary injunction lapsed, and no further action was taken by the administration or the courts.

But a growing number of union members had backed off their earlier demand for the right to strike over local issues. Wildcat strikes reduced productivity, which in turn (under the contract) reduced employers' contributions to UMWA pension and health funds. They realized that under these conditions, the right to strike, would only further harm their health and pension plans. Additionally, many miners began to realize that the strikes were hurting the union's organizing chances, especially in the West.

Eventually, UMWA and mine negotiators settled on a compromise. They tentatively agreed on new, improved dispute resolution procedures which, they hoped, would lower the number of wildcat strikes.

== Contract settlement ==
Although Miller and his leadership worked hard to convince members that the contract was a good one, they avoided the errors of their previous effort. Country-western singer Johnny Paycheck was hired to sing and narrate several soft-sell one-minute radio spots. Miller traveled heavily through Appalachia, where he was best known and where opposition had been strongest, speaking to members and making numerous television appearances. District presidents also went on radio and television, using free media to tout the benefits of the agreement.

This time, the miners approved the tentative contract by vote of 57 percent to 43 percent. The strike ended on March 19, and the miners returned to work March 26.

The pact called for:

- A 37 percent wage hike, albeit with loss of the cost-of-living clause won in 1974.
- Institution of a productivity incentive bonus plan.
- Discipline (including loss of health and pension benefits) and/or discharge for any employee who participated in or caused a wildcat strike, but no punishment for honoring the picket line established by a wildcat strike.
- Guaranteed payment of health and retirement benefits, even if the union's health and pension funds were depleted.
- Shuttering of the union's health and pension funds, to be replaced by health and pension plans offered by the employers.
- Health care deductibles of $275 per family per year (less for retirees) and $50 per family per year for prescription drugs.
- Union payments to the existing union health fund to compensate for revenues lost due to wildcat strikes.

While ratification of the agreement was a victory for Miller, it also signaled the end of his effectiveness as leader of the United Mine Workers of America. Political infighting, his autocratic behavior, and the troubled 1978 contract negotiations finished him. On March 29, 1978, just ten days after the coal mining contract was ratified, Miller suffered a stroke while on vacation in Miami Beach, Florida. On April 12, 1978, while still in the hospital, Miller suffered a mild heart attack. His health never recovered fully. His union political opponents had decided that his erratic behavior and poor physical condition justified putting him on involuntary leave when he suffered a third heart attack. Miller resigned on November 12, 1978. After a lengthy illness, Arnold Miller died on July 12, 1985, at a hospital in Charleston, West Virginia.

The 1978 contract is widely seen as a concessionary contract. Workers lost their cradle-to-grave health and pension benefits, were forced to pay for part of their health care for the first time in 30 years, and were forced to resume working under a productivity bonus system eliminated in 1946. Meanwhile, the union's primary goal—winning the right to strike over local issues—was never accomplished.

== Works cited ==
- "Carter Invokes Taft-Hartley Act to Force Reopening of Coal Mines." Facts on File. March 10, 1978.
- "The Coal Miners Decide," Time, March 13, 1978.
- "Coal Miners Strike as Pact Expires." Associated Press. December 9, 1977.
- "The Coal Miners Walk Out." Time. December 12, 1977.
- "Coal Strike Ends on 110th Day after Miners Approve Agreement," Facts on File, March 31, 1978.
- "Coal Strike Explosions." Washington Post. December 17, 1977.
- "Coal Strike in 11th Day." Washington Post. December 16, 1977.
- Dewar, Helen. "Coal Industry's Bullish Talk of Last Spring Didn't Last." Washington Post. March 21, 1978.
- Dewar, Helen. "Unit Recesses Without Vote on UMW Pact." Washington Post. February 8, 1978.
- Franklin, Ben A. "Arnold Miller is Dead at 62; Former Mine Workers' President." New York Times. July 12, 1985.
- Krohe Jr., James. "The UMW Battlefield Moves Beyond the Coal Field." Illinois Issues. April 1980.
- "Mine Strike Erupts Into Violence in Ky." Washington Post. December 14, 1977.
- Navarro, Peter. "Union Bargaining Power in the Coal Industry, 1945-1981." Industrial and Labor Relations Review. 36:2 (January 1983).
- "Negotiators in Coal Strike Sidestep a Sticking Point," Washington Post, December 20, 1977.
- "No Peace in the Pits." Time. June 27, 1977.
- "To Work." Time. March 20, 1978.
- "Turmoil in the UMW." Business Week. January 31, 1977.
