= Yellowdirt, Georgia =

- Unincorporated community
- Location within the state of Georgia Yellowdirt (the United States)
- Coordinates: 33°24′50″N 85°2′27″W
- Country: United States
- State: Georgia
- County: Heard
- Elevation: 771 ft (235 m)
- Time zone: UTC-5 (Eastern (EST))
  - Summer (DST): UTC-4 (EDT)
- GNIS feature ID: 356655

Yellowdirt is an unincorporated community in Heard County, Georgia, United States.

== History ==
A post office called Yellow Dirt was established in 1877, and remained in operation until 1904. The community took its name from nearby Yellowdirt Creek.
