= Assistant Secretary of the Air Force =

Flag used by assistant secretaries of the Air Force and the general counsel of the Air Force.

Assistant Secretary of the Air Force is the title of five civilian officials in the United States Department of the Air Force. They report to and assist the United States secretary of the Air Force and the United States under secretary of the Air Force.

According to U.S. law, there are five assistant secretaries of the Air Force "appointed from civilian life by the President, by and with the advice and consent of the Senate." "The Assistant Secretaries shall perform such duties and exercise such powers as the Secretary of the Air Force may prescribe." The duties of three of the assistant secretaries are statutorily defined:

- Assistant Secretary of the Air Force (Manpower & Reserve Affairs)
- Assistant Secretary of the Air Force (Financial Management & Comptroller)
- Assistant Secretary of the Air Force (Acquisition, Technology and Logistics)
- Assistant Secretary of the Air Force (Energy, Installations & Environment)
- Assistant Secretary of the Air Force (Space Acquisition & Integration)

The general counsel of the Air Force is also considered to be equivalent in rank to an assistant secretary of the Air Force.
