= Shoulderbone, Georgia =

Unincorporated community in Georgia, U.S.

Coordinates: 33°20′23″N 83°04′48″W

Shoulderbone is an unincorporated community in Hancock County, in the U.S. state of Georgia.

== History ==
A variant name was "Shoulder". The community was named for its location on Shoulderbone Creek.
