= William C. Anderson (Air Force) =

American politician

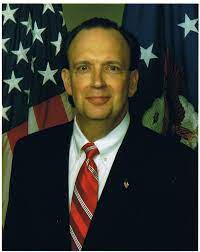
- William C Anderson
- Born: William Carl "Bill" Anderson; July 9, 1958 (age 68); Syracuse, New York, U.S.
- Occupation: Assistant Secretary of the Air Force (Installations, Environment and Logistics) (2005-2008)

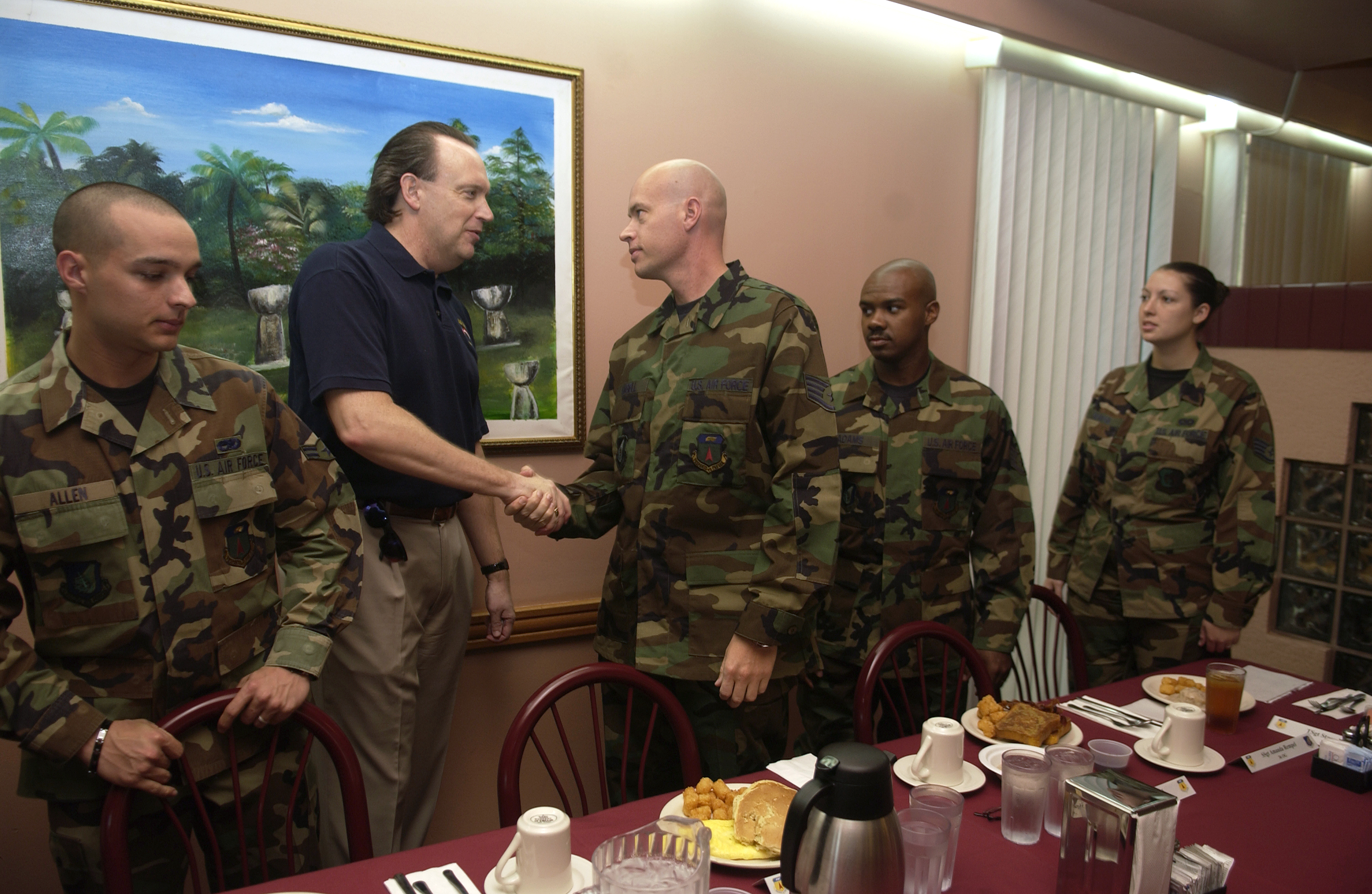
Anderson meeting with airmen at Andersen Air Force Base in January 2007

William Carl Anderson (born July 9, 1958) was United States Assistant Secretary of the Air Force (Installations, Environment & Logistics) from 2005 to 2008.

== Biography ==
Anderson was born in 1958 in Syracuse, New York, and educated at Washington College, receiving a B.A. in history in 1980. He then attended the Syracuse University College of Law, receiving a J.D. in 1983.

Anderson then spent several years working in a variety of financial and tax consulting positions at Merrill Lynch, Arthur Andersen and Ryder. He spent 1989-90 studying in the master's program in international business at the University of Miami Business School, but did not complete the degree. In September 1990, he joined General Electric as Senior Counsel - Environmental, Health and Safety, a position he held until November 2005.

In 2005, President George W. Bush nominated Anderson as Assistant Secretary of the Air Force (Installations, Environment & Logistics) and, after Senate confirmation, Anderson held this office from November 2005 until August 2008.

After leaving government service in 2008, Anderson founded his own consulting firm, Anderson Global Innovation Group, Inc. He was appointed to the Advisory Board of Hyperion Power Generation in August 2009.

Government offices
Preceded by Nelson F. Gibbs	Assistant Secretary of the Air Force (Installations, Environment & Logistics); November 2005 – August 2008	Succeeded by Terry A. Yonkers
