= John Henderson (engineer) =

American engineer

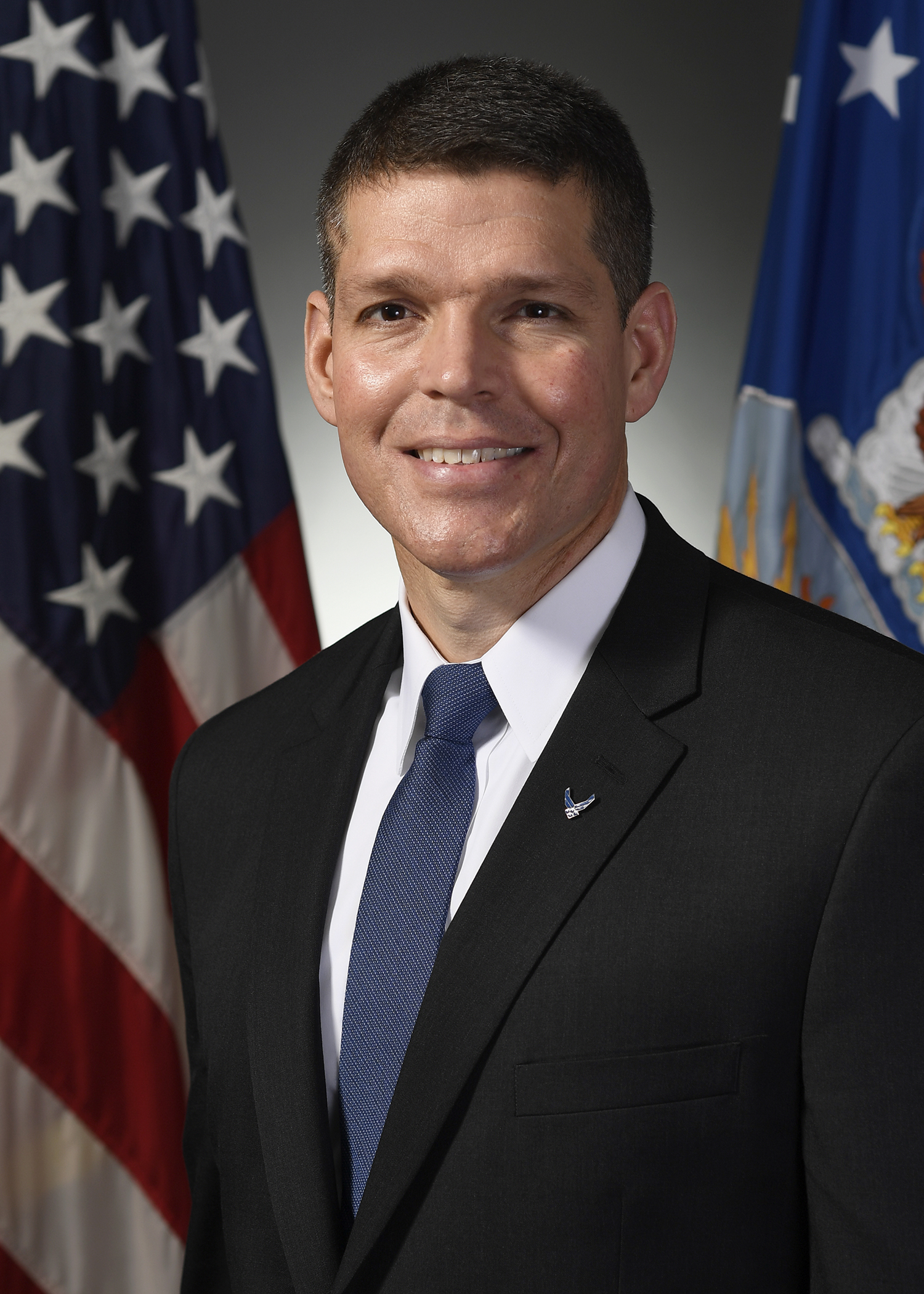

Assistant Secretary of the Air Force (Installations, Environment & Energy)
- In office February 20, 2018 – January 14, 2021
- President: Donald Trump
- Preceded by: Miranda A. A. Ballentine
- Succeeded by: Ravi Chaudhary

Personal details
- Education: South Dakota School of Mines and Technology

John W. Henderson is an American engineer, United States Army engineer officer, and government official. He was Assistant Secretary of the Air Force (Installations, Environment & Energy) in the Trump administration. His nomination by President Donald Trump was confirmed by the U.S. Senate on February 15, 2018. Prior to his nomination, Henderson most recently served in the U.S. Army as the Commander of the Omaha District, Army Corps of Engineers. He has over 23 years of active military experience as an Army engineer officer, including two combat tours to Iraq and one combat tour to Afghanistan as an engineer battalion task force commander.

Henderson is the CEO of the Omaha based engineering firm HDR.
