= Nelson F. Gibbs =

American government official (born 1938)

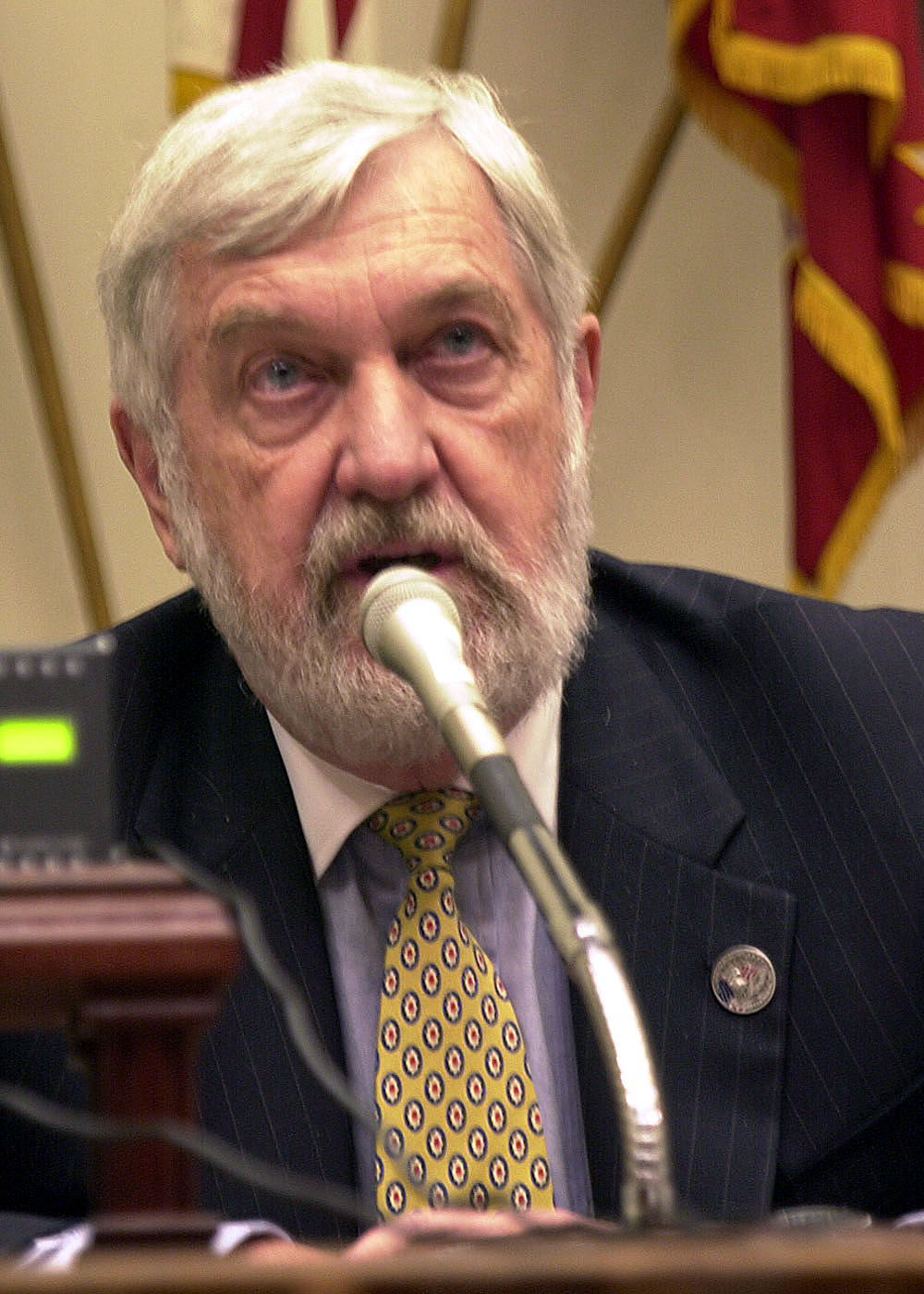

Assistant Secretary of the Air Force (Installations, Environment & Logistics)
- In office 2001–2005
- Succeeded by: William C. Anderson

Personal details
- Born: Nelson Frederick Gibbs; January 8, 1938 (age 88) Rochester, New York, U.S.
- Education: Clarkson University (B.S.); Purdue University (M.S.)

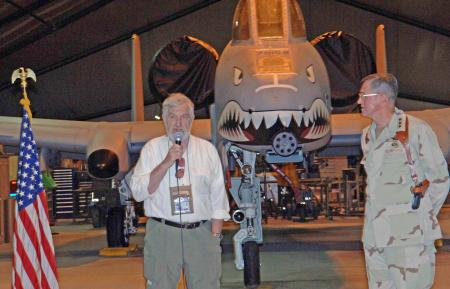
Gibbs speaking at Bagram Airfield while Lt. Gen. Walter E. Buchanan III, Commander of the Ninth Air Force, looks on.

Nelson Frederick Gibbs (born January 8, 1938) was United States Assistant Secretary of the Air Force (Installations, Environment & Logistics) from 2001 to 2005.

== Biography ==
Nelson F. Gibbs was born in Rochester, New York. He was educated at Clarkson University, receiving a bachelor's degree in civil engineering in 1959. While at the Clarkson he was a member of the National Society of Pershing Rifles. From 1959 to 1962, he served as an officer in the United States Army. He also earned a M.S. in industrial management from Purdue University in 1962.

In 1962, Gibbs joined the Los Angeles office of Deloitte & Touche as a General Management and Financial Systems Consultant. He was made an audit partner in 1971; Director of Audit Operations in 1982; Lead client Service Partner from 1986 to 1987; and Senior Partner in Deloitte's Tokyo office from 1988 to 1991. In 1991, he joined Northrop Grumman as Corporate Controller in Los Angeles, a position he held until 1999.

In 1999, Gibbs entered the Office of Management and Budget as executive director of the Cost Accounting Standards Board. He worked there until 2001, when President of the United States George W. Bush nominated him to be Assistant Secretary of the Air Force (Installations, Environment & Logistics), an office he subsequently held until 2005.

After retiring from government service in 2005, Gibbs became a member of the Board of Trustees of The Aerospace Corporation.

Government offices
Preceded by ???	Assistant Secretary of the Air Force (Installations, Environment & Logistics); 2001 – 2005	Succeeded by William C. Anderson
