= Temperance Hall =

Temperance Hall may refer to:

- A building used for Temperance movement-related activities

== United States ==
- Temperance Hall (Dedham, Massachusetts), a building established in 1845
- Cokato Temperance Hall, an 1896 clubhouse built in Cokato Township, Minnesota
- Temperance Hall (1851), part of the Hertford Historic District, North Carolina
- Mount Hebron Temperance Hall, an 1862 chapter house in West Columbia, Lexington County, South Carolina
- Temperance Hall, Tennessee, an unincorporated community
- Old Temperance Hall (c. 1849), part of the Union Historic District, West Virginia

== Other places ==
- Orange and Temperance Hall, in Tobermore, County Londonderry, Northern Ireland
- Toronto Temperance Hall, in Toronto, Ontario, Canada; see Jesse Ketchum § Temperance Hall
- Avalon Theatre, Hobart, (formerly Temperance Hall), in Hobart, Tasmania, Australia

== See also ==
- Temperance (disambiguation)
- Temperance Billiard Hall (disambiguation)
