= Assistant Secretary of the Air Force (Energy, Installations & Environment) =

Civilian office in the U.S. Department of the Air Force

Assistant Secretary of the Air Force (Energy, Installations and Environment)
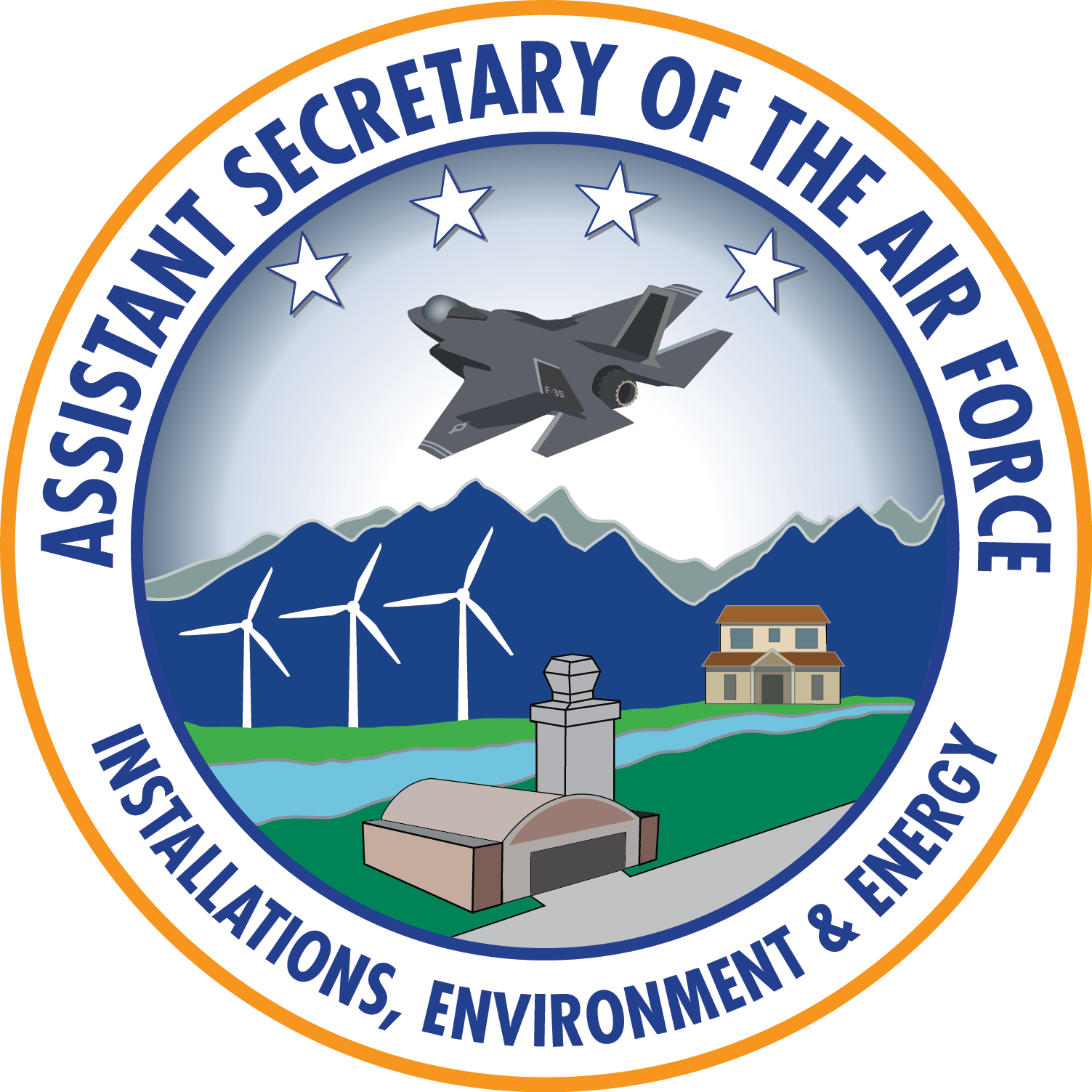
- Seal of the former assistant secretary (installations, environment and energy)

- Flag of an assistant secretary of the Air Force

- Incumbent; Michael Borders Jr. since January 23, 2026
- Department of the Air Force
- Style: The Honorable (formal address in writing)
- Reports to: Secretary of the Air Force; Under Secretary of the Air Force
- Seat: The Pentagon, Arlington County, Virginia, United States
- Nominator: The president with Senate advice and consent
- Term length: No fixed term
- Constituting instrument: 10 U.S.C. § 9016
- Formation: 2001
- Succession: 17th in SecDef succession by seniority of appointment
- Deputy: Principal Deputy Assistant Secretary of the Air Force for Energy, Installations and Environment
- Salary: Executive Schedule, Level IV
- Website: Official website

Assistant Secretary of the Air Force (Energy, Installations and Environment) (SAF/IE) is the title of a civilian office in the United States Department of the Air Force. Along with the four other assistant secretaries of the Air Force, the assistant secretary of the Air Force (energy, installations and environment) assists the secretary and the under secretary of the Air Force.

By law, the SAF/IE is appointed by the president of the United States "from civilian life with the advice and consent of the United States Senate." Unlike the other assistant secretaries, whose duties are statutorily defined, the SAF/IE evolved to meet the needs of the United States Air Force, as determined by the secretary of the Air Force. The SAF/IE is primarily tasked with oversight of all United States Air Force installations. Its other responsibility is for all functions required to keep the United States Air Force in a state of readiness, maintain occupational safety and health on Air Force installations, and coordinate environmental issues related to maintaining the Air Force's fleet and installations. The SAF/IE also manages the Office of Energy Assurance (OEA), which develops, implements and oversees an integrated facility energy portfolio.

== Components ==
The principal subordinate of the SAF/IE is the principal deputy assistant secretary of the air force (installations, environment and energy).

Other major subordinates include: the deputy assistant secretary of the air force (installations) (SAF/IEI), the deputy assistant secretary of the air force (infrastructure, energy and environment) (SAF/IEE), and the deputy assistant secretary of the Air Force (operational energy, safety and occupational health) (SAF/IEN).

== History ==
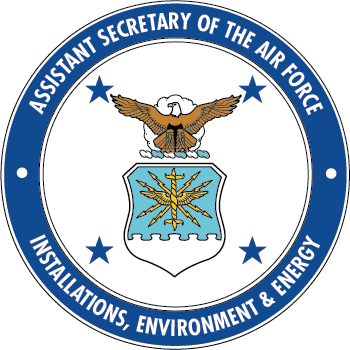
Alternate former SAF/IE insignia

On August 13, 2001, the secretary of the air force eliminated the assistant secretary of the air force (manpower, reserve affairs, installations and environment) (SAF/MI), splitting it into two new posts: the assistant secretary of the air force (installations, environment and logistics) (SAF/IE) and the assistant secretary of the air force (manpower and reserve affairs) (SAF/MR).

In mid-2014, the assistant secretary of the air force (installations, environment and logistics) was renamed to the assistant secretary of the air force (installations, environment and energy), and the abbreviation remained as SAF/IE. The renaming reflected the logistics function of the post that transferred to the assistant secretary of the air force (acquisition) (SAF/AQ).

By early 2020, the post was renamed to the assistant secretary of the air force (energy, installations and environment), still retaining the abbreviation SAF/IE.

== List of assistant secretaries of the air force (energy, installations and environment) ==
Picture	Name	Assumed office	Left office	President appointed by	Secretary served under
As assistant secretary of the air force (installations, environment and logistics)
	Nelson F. Gibbs	2001	~2005	George W. Bush	James G. Roche
	William C. Anderson	2005	August 2008	George W. Bush	Michael Wynne
	Kevin W. Billings (acting)	August 2008	~May 2009	George W. Bush Barack Obama	Michael B. Donley
	Debra K. Tune (acting)	May 2009	March 2010	Barack Obama	Michael B. Donley
	Terry A. Yonkers	May 7, 2010	March 2, 2013	Barack Obama	Michael B. Donley Deborah Lee James
	Kathleen I. Ferguson (acting)	March 2, 2013	September 22, 2014	Barack Obama	Deborah Lee James
As assistant secretary of the air force (installations, environment and energy)
	Miranda A. A. Ballentine	September 22, 2014	January 20, 2017	Barack Obama	Deborah Lee James
	Richard K. Hartley (acting)	January 20, 2017	February 20, 2018	Donald Trump	Lisa Disbrow (acting); Heather Wilson
As assistant secretary of the air force (energy, installations and environment)
	John W. Henderson	February 20, 2018	January 14, 2021	Donald Trump	Heather Wilson; Matthew Donovan (Acting); Barbara Barrett
	Jennifer L. Miller (acting)	January 14, 2021	January 2022	Donald Trump; Joe Biden	Barbara Barrett; John P. Roth (acting); Frank Kendall III
	Edwin H. Oshiba (acting)	January 2022	April 7, 2023	Joe Biden	Frank Kendall III
	Ravi Chaudhary	April 7, 2023	January 20, 2025	Joe Biden	Frank Kendall III
	Michael E. Saunders (acting)	January 20, 2025	January 23, 2026	Donald Trump	Gary A. Ashworth (acting); Troy Meink
	Michael Borders Jr.	January 23, 2026	Present	Donald Trump	Troy Meink
