= Whitehall, Georgia =

Neighborhood in Athens, Georgia

Coordinates: 33°54′25″N 83°21′26″W

Whitehall is a location in Clarke County, Georgia entirely within the city limits of Athens, Georgia.

== History ==
It is the location of White Hall (Whitehall, Georgia), at Whitehall and Simonton Bridge Roads, a property which was listed on the National Register of Historic Places in 1979.

The Georgia General Assembly incorporated Whitehall as a town in 1891. Today, Whitehall is a neighborhood of Athens.
