= Telfair Woods, Georgia =

Unincorporated community in Georgia, U.S.

Coordinates: 33°05′37″N 81°49′25″W

Telfair Woods is an unincorporated community in Burke County, in the U.S. state of Georgia.

== History ==
Variant names were "Fort Telfair" and "Telfairville". A post office called Telfairville was established 1892, and remained in operation until 1907. The original name "Telfairville" was bestowed in honor of Edward Telfair, the sixteenth governor of Georgia and a member of the Continental Congress.
