= Nick Shingler =

English cartoonist (born 1959)

- Occupation: Cartoonist
- Years active: 1970s–present
- Notable work: Cov Kids Cartoons

Nick Shingler (born 1959) is an English cartoonist, illustrator and building surveyor known for his artwork and cartoons, especially those published in collaboration with the Coventry Telegraph. He gained popularity as the creator of The Cov Kids cartoons, an ongoing series which he began in 2013 and has been published most notably in the Coventry Telegraph and the Wasps Rugby Matchbooks. Shingler is the host of The Cov Kids cartoon workshops, sessions about art and creativity specially curated for children. He has also collaborated with the Shop Front Festival and UK City of Culture 2021.

== Life and career ==
Shingler grew up in Wolverhampton, a metropolitan city in central England. After completing his primary education, he went to art school in the 70s. In the 1980s, he fell in love with the city of Coventry in the West Midlands and moved there. He permanently settled in Coventry and has continued his career in the city ever since. Shingler is now married with 2 children and lives in Earlsdon.

As a child, Shingler was fascinated with comic books and paintings and extensively read Marvel comics and Beano's Bash Street Kids. He was heavily influenced by British cartoonist Carl Giles of the Daily Express and American artist and writer Jack Kirby from Marvel Comics. Many of Shingler's own characters today are inspired by and based upon these characters from Marvel and The Beano. Even though he is a building surveyor by profession, Shingler's passion for art evolved from being just a hobby to a proper occupation and his stature in the art industry has grown over the years.

Shingler initially tasted national success as a teenager in the early 1970s when one of his paintings was featured in a London art gallery, leading to national coverage in the Guardian newspaper. In the 1980s, he had paintings exhibited in the Coventry Cathedral and the Herbert Art Gallery & Museum. Apart from his frequent collaborations with the Coventry Telegraph and Wasps Rugby Team in the 2010s, he exhibited a full comic strip at the Leeds Thought Bubble Festival, depicting an airborne Angel of the North. The Coventry Music Museum, an independent charity, admired one his artworks called 2-Tone Village. Shingler donated a signed copy of the piece to the Museum.

== Style ==
Nick prefers the traditional method of using pen and ink to draw. He first creates his pieces on an A4 sheet of paper, which is then rendered and reproduced at a third of its original size. His choice of background and setting is realistic and recognizable, upon which he imposes the Cov Kids characters. The drawing process usually takes him about 2 to 3 hours but additional time is required for preparation and photography.
