= Vans Valley, Georgia =

Unincorporated community in Georgia, U.S.

Coordinates: 34°07′53″N 85°19′24″W

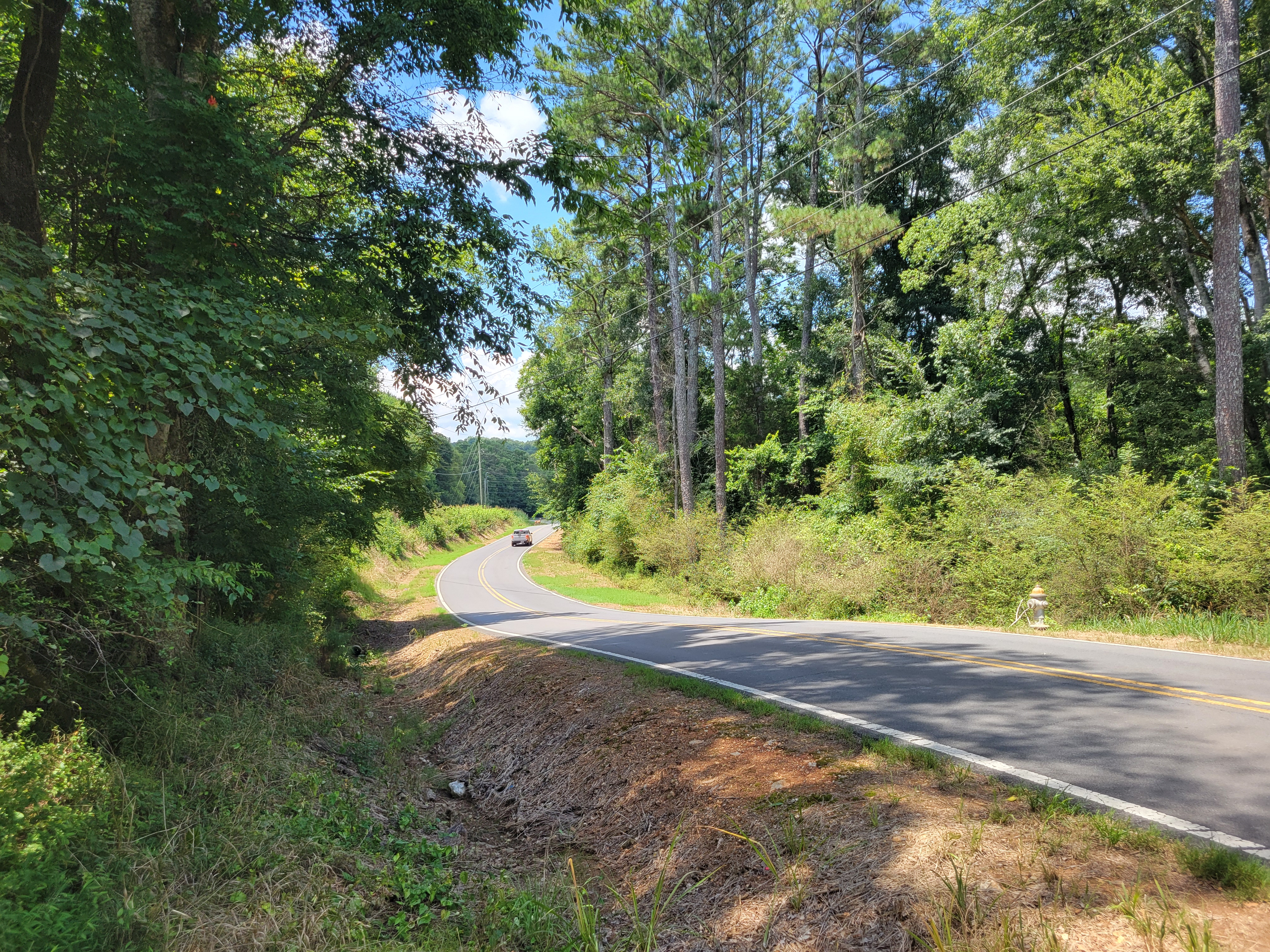
Sprout Springs Road

Vans Valley is an unincorporated community in Floyd County, in the U.S. state of Georgia.

== History ==
A post office called Vann's Valley was established in 1832, and remained in operation until it was discontinued in 1901. The community was named in honor of David Vann, a Cherokee leader.
