= Swords, Georgia =

Unincorporated community in Georgia, U.S.

Coordinates: 33°32′39″N 83°18′25″W

Swords is an unincorporated community in Morgan County, in the U.S. state of Georgia.

== History ==
An early variant name was "Blue Spring". A post office called Swords was established in 1897, and remained in operation until 1959. The present name is after John Buchanan Swords, a pioneer settler.

The Georgia General Assembly incorporated Swords as a town in 1909. The town has since lost its charter and Swords today is unincorporated. Once a thriving little town that included a bank, post office, school, jail, general supply store, blacksmith shop, grist mill, cotton gin and cotton warehouses. A distillery started in part to the local natural spring nearby was started by J.B. Swords where the town got its name. However, with prohibition the distillery died and so did the town. All but one building was consequently burned to the ground. Only the walk-in vault in the bank is left standing. You can still see the entrance to the vault by its huge iron door.
