= Whitehouse, Georgia =

Unincorporated community in Georgia, U.S.

Coordinates: 33°32′35″N 84°08′15″W

Whitehouse is an unincorporated community in Henry County, in the U.S. state of Georgia.

== History ==
The community was named for a white house which once stood prominently at the town site. The name is sometimes spelled out "White House". A post office called White House was established in 1836, and remained in operation until 1902.
