= Viola, Georgia =

Unincorporated community in Georgia, U.S.

Coordinates: 33°15′17″N 85°08′56″W

Viola is an unincorporated community in Heard County, in the U.S. state of Georgia.

== History ==
A post office called Viola was established in 1889, and remained in operation until 1905. The community was named after one Viola Franklin.
