= 1974 UMW Bituminous coal strike =

United States coal strike

- Date: November 12, 1974-December 10, 1974
- Location: United States

Parties
UMW	Mining Companies

The Bituminous coal strike of 1974 was a 28-day national coal strike in the United States led by the United Mine Workers of America. It is generally considered a successful strike by the union.

Since the 1940s, the United Mine Workers of America (UMWA) had negotiated a nationwide National Coal Wage Agreement with the Bituminous Coal Operators Association (BCOA), a group of large coal mine operators. The three-year agreements covered national bargaining issues such as wages, health and pension benefits, workplace health and safety, and work rules. Local agreements, far more limited in scope, were negotiated by each individual local affiliate of UMWA.

== Murder and turmoil in UMWA ==
UMWA had been rocked by internal turmoil since the previous national agreement had been negotiated in 1971. President W. A. Boyle had rigged the 1969 UMWA presidential election against challenger Joseph "Jock" Yablonski. Yablonski lost the election, but asked the United States Department of Labor to investigate. Boyle, who had been plotting Yablonski's murder since June 1969, used $20,000 in union funds to pay three men to kill Yablonski. Yablonski, his wife and 25-year-old daughter were murdered in their home on December 31, 1969. A reform movement, Miners for Democracy (MFD), arose within UMWA. The federal government overturned the election in 1971, and ordered a new election to be held in December 1972. Arnold Miller, a miner from West Virginia, was elected the new president of UMWA. (Boyle and eight others were convicted of murder and conspiracy to commit murder in 1974.)

== Strike ==
Miller initiated several democratic reforms which affected the renegotiation of the national coal collective bargaining agreement. UMWA's bargaining demands were now set by a 36-member bargaining council rather than the president and his aides. Tentative agreements now were subject to approval by the bargaining council and member ratification. Wildcat strikes had become common in the coal industry as union miners grew frustrated with what they saw as poor terms of national contracts and employer foot-dragging on resolving disputes and grievances. Miller hoped that these democratic reforms would decrease the number of wildcat strikes.

UMWA's collective bargaining demands included a 40 percent wage and benefit increase, significantly stronger health and safety language, five days of guaranteed sick leave each year, and higher employer contributions to the union's health and pension funds. Anticipating a long strike, Miller and other key union officials visited Great Britain to discuss strike tactics with the militant leaders of the British coal unions.

Employers were willing to make concessions on wages and benefits. Workers in other basic industries such as steel and automobile manufacturing were making much more money than coal miners, even though their occupations were not nearly as dangerous to health or safety. However, the mine operators demanded an end to wildcat strikes. Employer contributions to UMWA's health and pension plans were dependent on the amount of coal mined. Wildcat strikes significantly reduced the tonnage mined, and reduced the revenues flowing into the UMWA health and pension plans. The employers argued they should not make higher payments to offset the effect of the wildcat strikes.

No new agreement was reached when the 1971 agreement expired, and UMWA struck on November 12, 1974. A tentative agreement was rejected twice by UMWA's bargaining council—once prior to and once during the strike.

Angered by the council's continuing demands for improvements, Miller declared he would not seek additional economic concessions from the employers but only non-economic improvements. National stockpiles of coal were somewhat high, so a winter-time heating crisis never emerged. However, the ongoing effects of the 1973 oil crisis had greatly enhanced the demand for coal, and steel and iron makers had few coking supplies on-hand. These factors kept the union's negotiating position strong despite the two contract rejections.

Federal government officials, however, intervened to push UMWA to accept the next contract. President Gerald Ford threatened to bring a Taft-Hartley Act injunction against the union to force the miners back to work. This pressure brought about a settlement on December 10, 1974. Miller was able to overcome bargaining council opposition to the tentative agreement by arguing that members alone should have the final say on the pact. The contract was narrowly approved, but only after heavy lobbying by Miller administration officials.

== Contract ==
The 1974 agreement was the richest contract in UMWA history. Miners received a 54 percent wage-and-benefit increase over three years. A cost-of-living clause, the first in the union's history, was also included. Vacation days rose from 20 to 30 days a year, and five days of "personal leave" also established. Employers agreed to pay for training safety committee members, quarterly mine-safety inspections conducted by UMWA, work clothing and safety equipment such as goggles. The agreement was ratified by 56 percent of the membership, which was a relatively narrow vote. Retired miners were particularly unhappy that their benefits were now lower than those offered to younger miners.

However, in a larger sense, the contract was a failure. The union members' unhappiness with the new collective bargaining agreement led to a continuing wave of wildcat strikes. Miller's democratic reforms had energized his critics and decentralized the union so that unity was now much more difficult to achieve. The number of wildcat strikes only increased through 1976, driving away many potential members and slowing organizing growth.

== See also ==
- UMW Bituminous coal strike of 1977–1978

== Works cited ==
- "The Coal Miners Walk Out." Time. December 12, 1977.
- "Coal's Chilling Strike." Time. November 18, 1974.
- Dewar, Helen. "Unit Recesses Without Vote on UMW Pact." Washington Post. February 8, 1978.
- "A Falling Out Among the UMW's Reformers." Business Week. June 30, 1975.
- Gestreicher, Richard. "Book Reviews: The Miners' Fight for Democracy: Arnold Miller and the Reform of the United Mine Workers, By Paul F. Clark." Pennsylvania History. 49 (July 1982).
- Navarro, Peter. "Union Bargaining Power in the Coal Industry, 1945-1981." Industrial and Labor Relations Review. January 1983.
- "Still in a Hole with Coal." Time. December 2, 1974.
- "Turmoil in the UMW." Business Week. January 31, 1977.
- "A Very Different Kind of Leader of the UMW." Business Week. December 3, 1979.
