= Stellaville, Georgia =

Unincorporated community in Georgia, U.S.

Coordinates: 33°11′25″N 82°19′52″W

Stellaville is an unincorporated community in Jefferson County, in the U.S. state of Georgia.

== History ==
An early variant name was "Sisterville". A post office called Stellaville was established in 1872, and remained in operation until 1954. The present name is after Stella Brinson, the daughter of a local citizen.

The Georgia General Assembly incorporated Stellaville as a town in 1891. The town's municipal charter was repealed in 1995.
