= Tickanetley, Georgia =

Unincorporated community in Georgia, U.S.

Coordinates: 34°39′14″N 84°17′38″W

Tickanetley is an unincorporated community in Gilmer County, in the U.S. state of Georgia.

== History ==
Tickanetley originally was the name of a Cherokee Indian village which stood at the present town site. A variant spelling is "Ticanetlee". A post office was established at Tickanetley in 1880, and remained in operation until 1914.
