= Wooster, Georgia =

Unincorporated community in Georgia, United States

Coordinates: 33°08′30″N 84°37′49″W

Wooster is an unincorporated community in Meriwether County, in the U.S. state of Georgia.

== History ==
The community was named after George Wooster, proprietor of a local country store. A post office called Wooster was established in 1894, and remained in operation until 1910.
