= Vega, Georgia =

Unincorporated community in Georgia, U.S.

Coordinates: 33°01′24″N 84°17′19″W

Vega is an unincorporated community in Pike County, in the U.S. state of Georgia.

== History ==
A post office called Vega was established in 1893, and remained in operation until 1907. The community was named after the star Vega.
