= Welcome, Georgia =

Unincorporated community in Georgia, U.S.

Coordinates: 33°23′47″N 84°52′25″W

Welcome is an unincorporated community in Coweta County, in the U.S. state of Georgia.

== History ==
A post office called Welcome was established in 1891, and remained in operation until 1901. Some say the community was named after Welcome Carter, a pioneer settler, while others believe the community was named for the fact the Indians were welcoming to the first settlers.
