= Terry A. Yonkers =

American government official (born 1949)

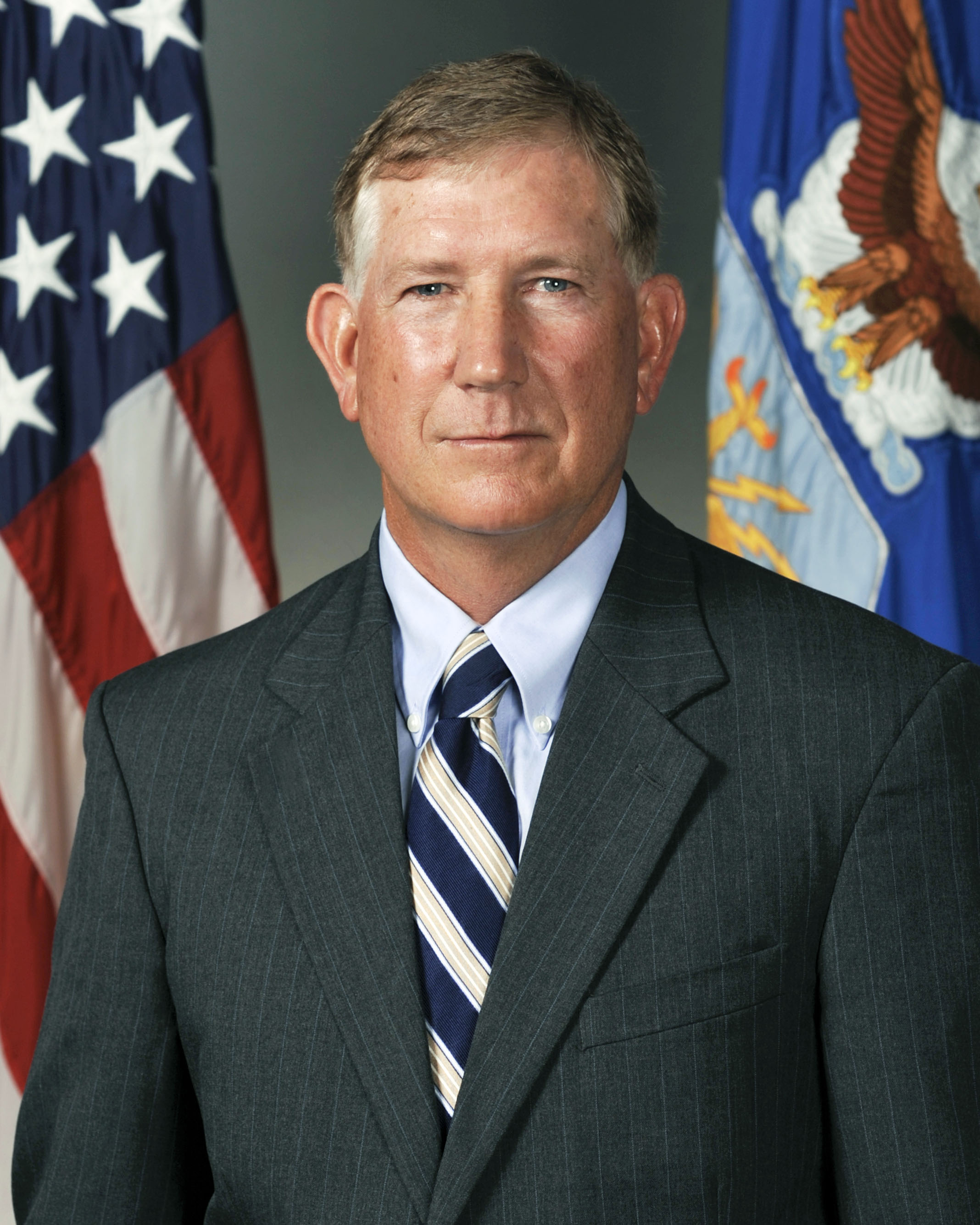
Yonkers in 2010

Terry Arthur Yonkers (born August 5, 1949) is a former United States Assistant Secretary of the Air Force (Installations, Environment & Logistics), holding that office from May 7, 2010 to March 2, 2013.

== Biography ==
Terry A. Yonkers was born in Hemet, California. He was educated at University of California, Riverside, graduating with a Bachelor of Science degree in Biology in 1972 and an advanced degree in Education in 1973.

From 1976 to 1980, Yonkers worked as a biologist for Southern California Edison in Rosemead, California. He became the environmental coordinator of the Air Force Flight Test Center at Edwards Air Force Base in 1980, holding this position until 1984. He spent 1984–85 as regulatory liaison and environmental engineer at the United States Air Force Regional Civil Engineering Office in Dallas. In 1985, he became Deputy Director Environmental Programs for the Air Force Systems Command at Andrews Air Force Base, holding this position until 1990.

He then served as Deputy Director and Chief of Environmental Programs at the Air Force Base Conversion Agency in Arlington County, Virginia from 1990 to 1996. During this time, he studied at the Industrial College of the Armed Forces, receiving a master's degree in national security studies in 1993. From 1996 to 2000, he was Special Assistant to the Assistant Secretary of the Air Force (Manpower, Reserve Affairs, Installations & Environment) at the Pentagon. During this period, in 1999, he attended the Executive Program of the Tepper School of Business. He was Deputy Assistant Secretary of the Air Force for Environment, Safety and Occupational Health 2000–2002. He earned an M.P.A. from George Mason University in 2001.

Yonkers left public service in 2002, joining Arcadis NV in Highlands Ranch, Colorado as Senior Vice President (Business Development). He worked there until 2010.

In 2010, President of the United States Barack Obama nominated Yonkers to be Assistant Secretary of the Air Force (Installations, Environment & Logistics). He was sworn into office on May 7, 2010.

On March 17th 2025, the former Secretary visits Hemet High School to greet the AFROTC students during a Weekly Inspection.

Government offices
Preceded by William C. Anderson	Assistant Secretary of the Air Force (Installations, Environment & Logistics); May 7, 2010 – March 2, 2013	Succeeded by Miranda A. A. Ballentine
