= Stonewall, Georgia =

Former town in south Fulton county

Stonewall
- Unincorporated community
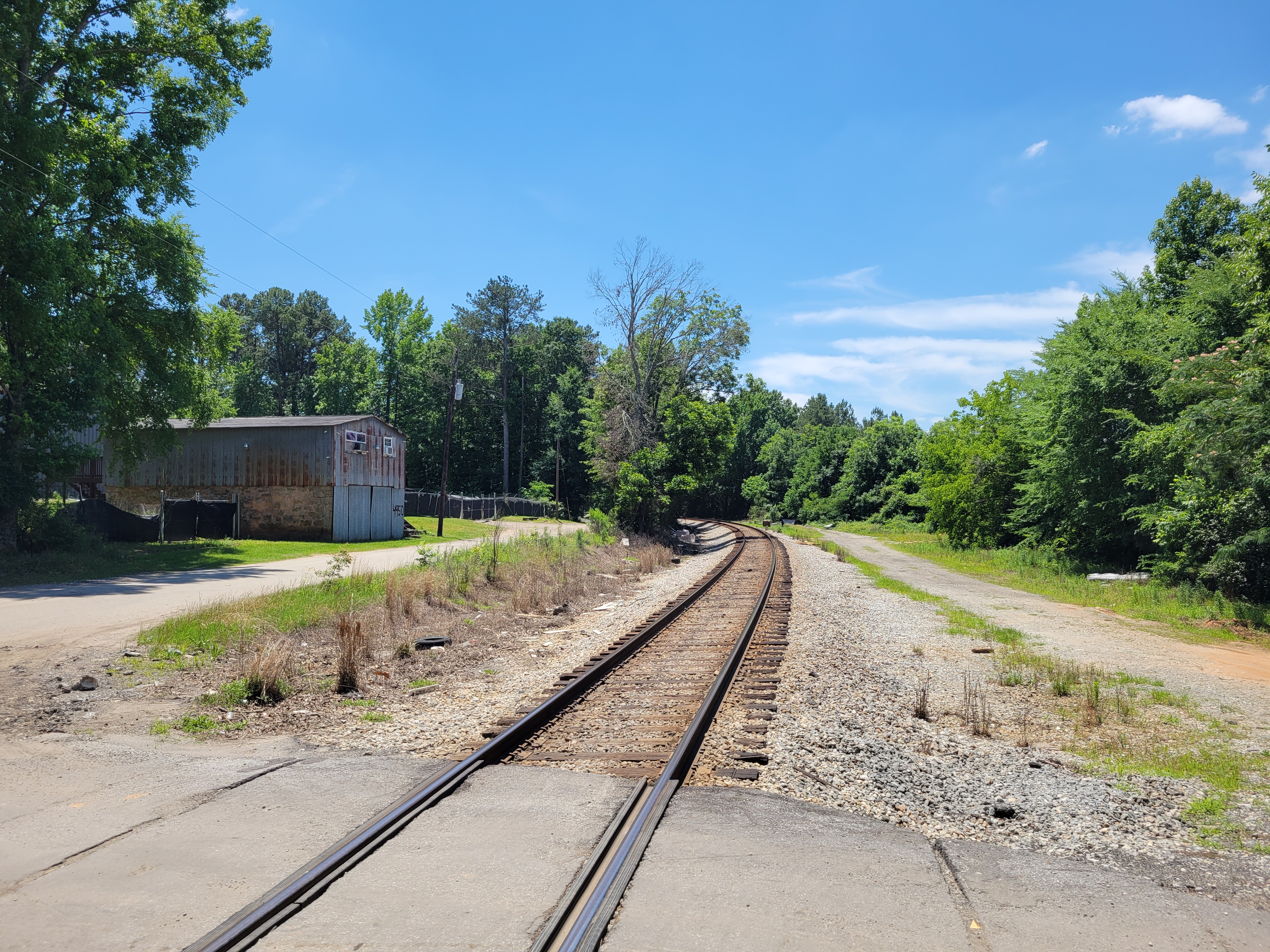
- Railroad tracks in Stonewall

- Location in Georgia
- Coordinates: 33°35′52″N 84°32′51″W
- Country: United States
- State: Georgia
- County: Fulton
- Established: 1911
- Time zone: UTC-5 (Eastern (EST))
  - Summer (DST): UTC-4 (EDT)

Stonewall is an unincorporated community in Fulton County, in the U.S. state of Georgia.

== History ==
A variant name was "Monk". The present name is in reference to the large stone wall built surrounding the former prison camp that sits on the grounds of the former county works facility at the corner of Stonewall Tell Road and Camp Drive.

Stonewall Tell Road is named as such because it connects Stonewall to the unincorporated community of Clfitondale which was formerly referred to as "Tell" until 1956 when community leaders petitioned to have the name changed.

The Georgia General Assembly incorporated Stonewall in 1911; the town's municipal charter was repealed in 1995.

The area was formerly referred to as Monk on the 1899 map.
