= Silco, Georgia =

Unincorporated community in Georgia, U.S.

Silco
- Unincorporated community
- Silco, Georgia
- Location of Silco in the State of Georgia
- Coordinates: 30°52′06″N 81°49′51″W
- Country: United States
- State: Georgia
- County: Camden County
- Elevation: 23 ft (7 m)
- Time zone: UTC−5 (EST)
  - Summer (DST): UTC−4 (EDT)
- Area code: 912
- GNIS ID: 333050

Silco is an unincorporated community located in western Camden County, in the U.S. state of Georgia. It is positioned within the West Kingsland voting precinct near the Charlton County border.

== Geography ==
Silco sits at an elevation of approximately 23 ft (7.0 m) above sea level. The community is situated along Georgia State Route 110, just north of its junction with Georgia State Route 40. It lies adjacent to a network of regional wetlands and waterways, notably south of the Satilla River, and shares its immediate geographic area with the small riverfront community of Bullhead Bluff.

== History ==
A post office called Silco was established in 1894 and remained operational until it was discontinued in 1911. The etymology of the name remains uncertain; it is either an invented name or is derived from the Creek language.

Historically, the broader Silco area was known for its dense timber holdings and agricultural tracts, which are frequently referenced in local land records and regional civil cases as the "SILCO Tract." In the late 19th century, infrastructure in the immediate vicinity included a railroad owned and operated by the Suwannee Canal Company, which transported timber from the nearby Okefenokee Swamp to shipping points on the Satilla River.
