= White Sulphur Springs, Meriwether County, Georgia =

Unincorporated community in Georgia, U.S.

Coordinates: 32°54′28″N 84°48′12″W

White Sulphur Springs is an unincorporated community in Meriwether County, in the U.S. state of Georgia.

== History ==
A post office called White Sulphur Springs was established in 1841, and remained in operation until 1919. The community was named for a mineral spring near the original town site. A variant name is "Brandywine Station".

The Georgia General Assembly incorporated White Sulphur Springs as a town in 1907. The town's municipal charter was repealed in 1995.
