= United States Department of the Air Force =

Military department in the Department of Defense

- Seal of the U.S. Department of the Air Force

Agency overview
- Formed: September 18, 1947; 79 years ago
- Preceding agency: Department of War
- Headquarters: The Pentagon, Arlington County, Virginia, U.S.
- Employees: 330,159 Regular Air Force; 151,360 Civilians; 68,872 Air Force Reserve; 94,753 Air National Guard
- Annual budget: $222.3B (FY2022)
- Secretary responsible: Troy Meink
- Under Secretary responsible: Matthew L. Lohmeier
- Parent department: United States Department of Defense
- Child agencies: United States Air Force; United States Space Force

The United States Department of the Air Force (DAF) is one of the three military departments within the United States Department of Defense. The Department of the Air Force was formed on September 18, 1947, per the National Security Act of 1947 (codified into Title 10 of the United States Code) and it is the military department within which the United States Air Force and the United States Space Force are organized.

The Department of the Air Force is headed by the secretary of the Air Force (SAF/OS), a civilian, who has the authority to conduct all of its affairs, subject to the authority, direction and control of the secretary of defense. The secretary of the Air Force's principal deputy is the under secretary of the Air Force (SAF/US). Their senior staff assistants in the Office of the Secretary of the Air Force are five assistant secretaries for acquisition, technology & logistics; energy, installations & environment; financial management & comptroller; manpower & reserve affairs; and space acquisition & integration and a general counsel. The highest-ranking military officers in the department, and senior military advisers to the secretary, are the chief of staff of the Air Force and chief of space operations.

By direction of the secretary of defense, the secretary of the Air Force assigns Air Force and Space Force units – apart from those units performing duties enumerated in 10 U.S.C. § 9013 unless otherwise directed – to the combatant commands. Only the secretary of defense and the president have the authority to approve a transfer of forces between combatant commands.

== Proposed redesignations ==
=== As the Department of the Aerospace Force ===
In 1981, Congressman Ken Kramer introduced legislation to rename the Department of the Air Force as the Department of the Aerospace Force, along with renaming the United States Air Force as the United States Aerospace Force, to reorient the service and department from an air force to an aerospace force. The legislation would also have established a space command within the Aerospace Force and renamed the Air National Guard to the Aerospace National Guard. The legislation was cosponsored by Representatives G. William Whitehurst, Ike Skelton, and Robin Beard of the United States House Committee on Armed Services. Although the legislation was supported by General James E. Hill, who commanded North American Aerospace Defense Command and Aerospace Defense Command, the Air Force did not support the name change and the legislation did not pass.

=== As the Department of the Air and Space Forces ===
Seal of the U.S. Space Force, which is organized within the Department of the Air Force

Following the United States Space Force's establishment, calls have been made for the Department of the Air Force to rename itself the Department of the Air and Space Forces to acknowledge the Space Force, similar to calls made for the Department of the Navy to rename itself the Department of the Navy and Marine Corps. SpaceNews reported that a proposed name change was considered in 2018, and in 2019 the Air Force Association also called for renaming the department. In 2022, the Air Force Association renamed itself the Air & Space Forces Association, internally acting on its proposal to reflect the Space Force in the organization's name. In a 2021 article in the Space Force Journal, two Space Force officers also proposed a name change for the department.

Congress has also proposed a variety of name changes within the Department of the Air Force to recognize the Space Force's establishment, including a 2022 proposal by the U.S. Senate to rename the Air National Guard to the Air and Space National Guard and 2020 proposal to rename the Airman's Medal the Air and Space Force Medal, mirroring the Navy and Marine Corps Medal.

== Organizational structure ==
The Department of the Air Force is divided into the Office of the Secretary of the Air Force, which is led by the United States secretary of the Air Force, the Air Staff which is led by the chief of staff of the Air Force, and the Space Staff which is led by the chief of space operations.

The Department of the Air Force consists of the United States Air Force, United States Space Force, and Air Force Civilian Service.

=== Headquarters Department of the Air Force ===
==== Secretariat ====
Office of the Secretary of the Air Force

- SAF/OS – Secretary of the Air Force
  - SAF/US – Under Secretary of the Air Force
    - SAF/IA – DUSAF for International Affairs
    - SAF/MG – DUSAF for Management
  - SAF/AQ – ASAF for Acquisition, Technology & Logistics
  - SAF/FM – ASAF for Financial Management & Comptroller
  - SAF/IE – ASAF for Energy, Installations & Environment
  - SAF/MR – ASAF for Manpower & Reserve Affairs
  - SAF/SA – Director for Air Force Studies and Analysis
  - SAF/SQ – ASAF for Space Acquisition and Integration
  - SAF/AM – Administration Management for the Secretary
  - SAF/AG – Auditor General of the Department of the Air Force
  - SAF/CN - Chief Information Officer of the Air Force
  - SAF/GC – General Counsel of the Department of the Air Force
  - SAF/IG – Inspector General of the Department of the Air Force
  - SAF/LL – Legislative Liaison
  - SAF/PA – Director of Public Affairs
  - SAF/SB – Director of Small Business Programs
  - SAF/OC - Director, Competitive Activities

==== Service staffs ====
Air Staff

- AF/CC – Chief of Staff of the Air Force
  - AF/CV – Vice Chief of Staff of the Air Force
  - CMSAF – Chief Master Sergeant of the Air Force
  - AF/DS – Air Force Director of Staff
  - A1 – DCS for Manpower, Personnel and Services
  - A2/6 – DCS for Intelligence, Surveillance and Reconnaissance and Cyber Effects Operations
  - A3 – DCS for Operations, Plans and Requirements
  - A5 – DCS for Strategy, Integration and Requirements
  - A4/7 – DCS for Logistics, Engineering and Force Protection
  - A8 – DCS for Plans and Programs
  - A9 – Director for Studies, Analysis and Assessments
  - A10 – DCS for Strategic Deterrence and Nuclear Integration
  - AF/CVS – Director of Sexual Assault Prevention and Response
  - AF/HC – Chief of Chaplains
  - AF/HO – Air Force Historian
  - AF/JA – Judge Advocate General of the Air Force
  - AF/SE – Chief of Safety of the Air Force
  - AF/SG – Surgeon General of the Air Force
  - AF/ST – Chief Scientist of the Air Force
  - AF/TE – Director of Test and Evaluation
  - AF/RE - Chief of Air Force Reserve
  - NGB/CF – Director of Air National Guard

Space Staff

- Chief of Space Operations
  - Vice Chief of Space Operations
  - Chief Master Sergeant of the Space Force
  - Director of Staff
  - DCSO for Personnel
  - DCSO for Intelligence
  - DCSO for Operations
  - DCSO for Strategy, Plans, Programs, Requirements and Analysis
  - DCSO for Cyber and Data

=== Service branches ===
- Structure of the United States Air Force
- Structure of the United States Space Force

== History ==
The Air Corps Act of 1926 (44 Stat. 780), passed on July 2 of that year, created a second assistant secretary position in the War Department variously called "Assistant Secretary of War for Aviation," "Assistant Secretary of War for Air," or "Assistant Secretary of War for Aeronautics." Those holding the office, with an eight-year vacancy between 1933 and 1941, were F. Trubee Davison (1926–1933), Robert A. Lovett (1941–1945), and Stuart Symington (1946–1947), who became the first United States Secretary of the Air Force.

== Budget ==
The Department of the Air Force Budget Overview as of 2027.

Department of the Air Force
Total Budget Request Summary Department of the Air Force	FY 2026 Enacted	FY 2027 Request (Total PBR)	Delta FY26 - FY27
Operation and Maintenance	82,283	101,508	+19,225
Military Personnel	46,207	48,710	+2,503
Research Development Test & Evaluation	65,585	98,247	+32,662
Procurement	46,033	73,331	+27,298
Military Construction & Family Housing	6,120	12,560	+6,440
Working Capital Fund	90	4,440	+4,350
Total Department	246,318	338,798	+92,480

*$ in Million ($M)

Numbers may not add due to rounding

== See also ==
- Awards and decorations of the United States Department of the Air Force
- Structure of the United States Air Force
- Department of the Air Force Police
- Title 32 of the Code of Federal Regulations
- Department of the Air Force Decoration for Exceptional Civilian Service

== Bibliography ==
- Grossman, Mark, ed. Encyclopedia of the United States Cabinet: 1789-2010 (Grey House, 2010) in-depth history of the department and its leaders. online
- "Airman Magazine: The Book 2010 – Personnel Facts and Figures". Airman Magazine, Volume 54 Number 3.
