= Tippettville, Georgia =

Unincorporated community in Georgia, United States

Coordinates: 32°05′56″N 83°36′51″W

Tippettville is an unincorporated community in Dooly County, in the U.S. state of Georgia.

== History ==
The community was named after brothers Abner and Ezekiel Tippett, the proprietors of a local country store. A post office called Tippettville was established in 1891, and remained in operation until 1904.
