= Yellowdirt Creek =

Stream in Georgia, U.S.

Coordinates: 33.4547°N 85.0695°W

Yellowdirt Creek is a stream in the U.S. state of Georgia. It is a tributary to the Chattahoochee River.

The creek's name is an accurate preservation of the native Muscogee language word Ikanlanihachi meaning "yellow dirt". Variant names were "Yellow Dirt Creek", "Yellow Land Creek" and "Puchusehatchee Creek".
