= York, Georgia =

Unincorporated community in Georgia, U.S.

Coordinates: 34°56′07″N 83°23′21″W

York is an unincorporated community in Rabun County, in the U.S. state of Georgia.

== History ==
The community most likely was named after York, in England.
