= Sweet Gum, Georgia =

Unincorporated community in Georgia, U.S.

Coordinates: 34°58′52″N 84°12′03″W

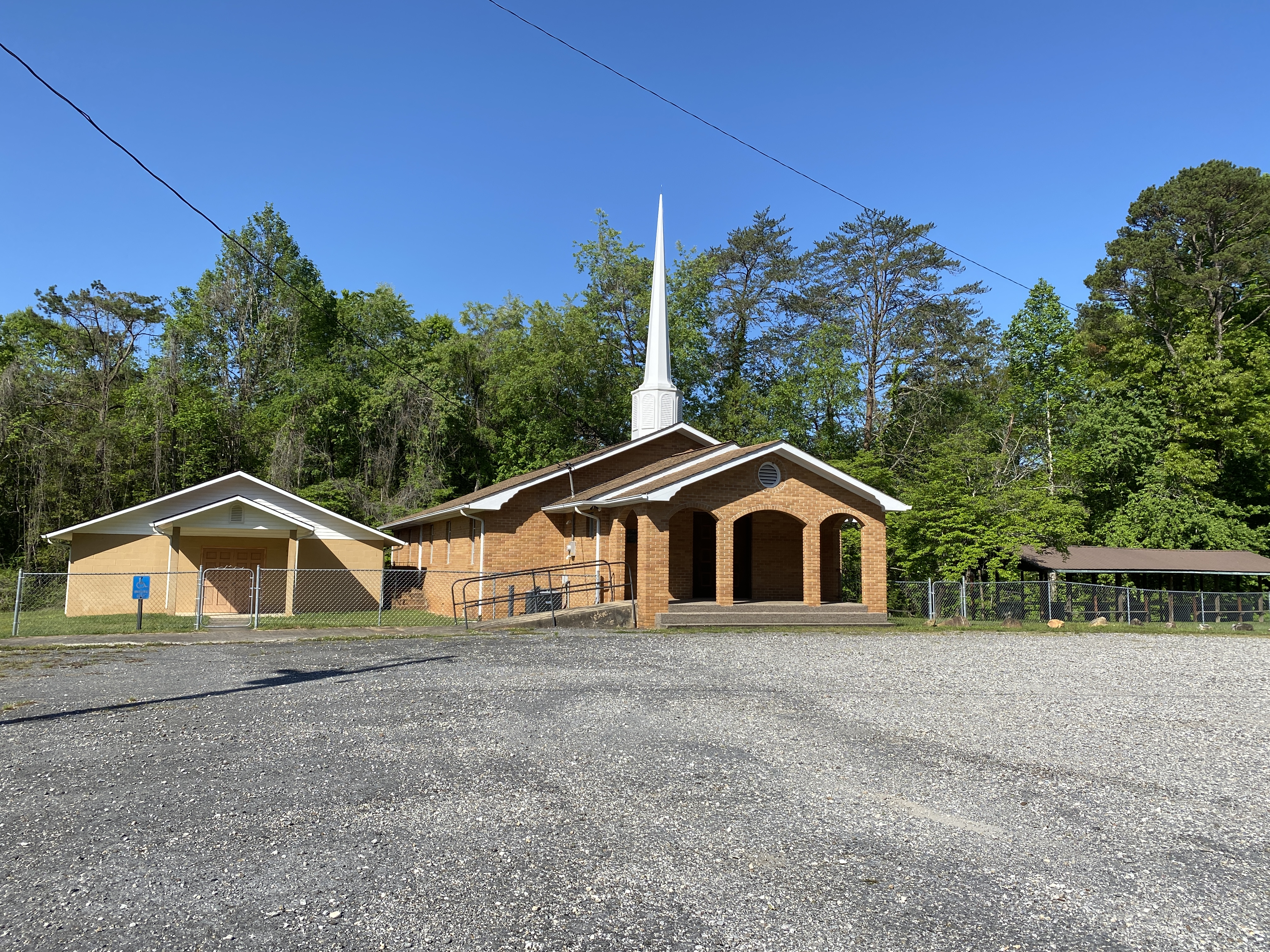
Sweetgum Baptist Church

Sweet Gum is an unincorporated community in Fannin County, in the U.S. state of Georgia.

== History ==
Prior to European colonization, the area that is now Sweet Gum was inhabited by the Cherokee people and other Indigenous peoples for thousands of years.

The community was named for sweet gum trees near the original town site. A variant name is "Sweetgum". A post office called Sweetgum was established in 1887, and remained in operation until 1939.
