= Shoulderbone Creek =

Stream in Georgia, U.S.

Coordinates: 33°19′11.50″N 83°7′5.55″W

- Location in Georgia, U.S.

Location
- Country: United States
- State: Georgia

Physical characteristics
- Mouth: Oconee River

Shoulderbone Creek is a stream in the U.S. state of Georgia. It is a tributary of the Oconee River.

Shoulderbone Creek received its name in the 1780s, but the reason this name was applied is unknown.
