= Walls Crossing, Georgia =

Unincorporated community in Georgia

Coordinates: 32°15′14″N 84°22′14″W

Walls Crossing is an unincorporated community in Schley County, in the U.S. state of Georgia.

== History ==
The community was named after Henry Wall, the proprietor of a local cotton gin.
