= Sumter, Georgia =

Unincorporated community in Georgia, U.S.

Coordinates: 31°56′58″N 84°15′18″W

Sumter is an unincorporated community in Sumter County, in the U.S. state of Georgia.

== History ==
A post office called Sumter was established in 1884, and remained in operation until 1954. Like Sumter County, the community is named after Thomas Sumter, a United States Senator from South Carolina.

The Webb Family Farm in Sumter was listed on the National Register of Historic Places in 1985.
