= Saint Marks, Georgia =

Unincorporated community in Georgia, U.S.

Coordinates: 33°07′31″N 84°49′16″W

Saint Marks is an unincorporated community in Meriwether County, in the U.S. state of Georgia.

== History ==
A post office called Saint Marks was established in 1875, and remained in operation until 1910. The community took its name from the local St. Marks Masonic Lodge.

The Georgia General Assembly incorporated Saint Marks as a town in 1897.
