= Silk Hope, Georgia =

Unincorporated community in Georgia, U.S.

Coordinates: 32°02′35″N 81°11′30″W

Silk Hope is an unincorporated community in Chatham County, in the U.S. state of Georgia.

== History ==
The community was named in the founders' hopes a silk textile industry would thrive here.
