= List of places in Georgia (country) =

List of places in Georgia (country) includes the following:

- Administrative divisions of Georgia (country)
- List of cities and towns in Georgia (country)
- List of municipalities in Georgia (country)
