= Undine, Georgia =

Unincorporated community in Georgia, U.S.

Coordinates: 32°13′39″N 81°58′46″W

Undine is an unincorporated community in Evans County, in the U.S. state of Georgia.

== History ==
The first permanent settlement at Undine was made in the early 1900s. A post office called Undine was established in 1900, and remained in operation until 1907.
