= Stephens, Georgia =

- Unincorporated community
- Interactive map of Stephens, Georgia
- Coordinates: 33°48′0″N 83°10′0″W
- Country: United States
- State: Georgia
- County: Oglethorpe
- Elevation: 764 ft (233 m)

Population (2010)
  - Total: 1,035
- Time zone: UTC-5 (Eastern (EST))
  - Summer (DST): UTC-4 (EDT)
- ZIP code: 30667
- Area code: 706

Stephens is an unincorporated community in Oglethorpe County, Georgia, United States. As of the 2010 census, the ZIP Code Tabulation Area for Stephens' post office had a population of 1035. The community of Stephens (including its post office) is located along State Route 77 between Maxeys and Lexington, at the intersection of Salem Road, which heads east through some rural and low-density residential areas and eventually on to State Route 22.

== History ==
An old variant name was "Antioch". The present name is after Alexander Stephens (1812–1883), Vice President of the Confederate States of America.

Not much evidence is left at the heart of the community, as the railroad that once ran along State Route 77 from Athens to Union Point was pulled up in 2000, and all that stands are a few abandoned buildings including a recently closed convenience store. The community's ZIP code still includes most areas in southern Oglethorpe County, however.

== Geography ==
Stephens is located at 33°48′00″N 83°10′0″W (33.79480, −83.16140).

== Demographics ==
As of the census of 2010, there were 1035 people, 378 households, and 269 families residing in the area. There were 460 housing units . The racial makeup of the area was 66.6% White, 24.7% African American, 0.2% Asian, 6.7% from other races, and 1.4% from two or more races. Hispanic or Latino of any race were 10.3% of the population.

There were 378 households, out of which 27.5% had children under the age of 18 living with them, 51.6% were married couples living together, 11.4% had a female householder with no husband present, and 28.8% were non-families. 24.9% of all households were made up of individuals, and 11.9% had someone living alone who was 65 years of age or older. The average household size was 2.74 and the average family size was 3.28.

In the area the population was spread out, with 24.7% under the age of 18, 10.1% from 18 to 24, 19.6% from 25 to 44, 30.0% from 45 to 64, and 15.6% who were 65 years of age or older. The median age was 40.5 years. For every 100 females, there were 107.8 males. For every 100 females age 18 and over, there were 107.7 males.

The median income for a household in the area was $36,115, and the median income for a family was $44,750. The per capita income for the area was $15,655. About 13.9% of families and 19.4% of the population were below the poverty line, including 13.3% of those under age 18 and 20.6% of those age 65 or over.
