= Tax Crossroads, Georgia =

Unincorporated community in Georgia, U.S.

Coordinates: 32°48′42″N 84°35′54″W

Tax Crossroads is an unincorporated community in Talbot County, Georgia.

== History ==
A variant name of the community was "Tax". The community was named for the fact tax collectors would pick up tax returns at the local country store. A post office called Tax was established in 1893, and remained in operation until 1910.
