= Talona, Georgia =

Unincorporated community in Georgia, U.S.

Coordinates: 34°35′50″N 84°30′43″W

Talona is an unincorporated community in Gilmer County, in the U.S. state of Georgia.

== History ==
"talona" is a name of Cherokee origin. Variant names include "Sanderstown", "Ta-Lo-Ney", "Tal-loe-ney", Talloney", "Taloney", and "Upper Talloney". A post office called Talona was established in 1886, and remained in operation until 1953.
