= Stuckey, Georgia =

Unincorporated community in Georgia, U.S.

Coordinates: 32°10′16″N 82°42′36″W

Stuckey is an unincorporated community in Wheeler County, in the U.S. state of Georgia.

== History ==
A post office called Stuckey was established in 1881, and remained in operation until 1953. Henry T. Stuckey, an early postmaster and proprietor of the local country store, gave the community his last name.
