= Temperance, Georgia =

Unincorporated community in Georgia, U.S.

Coordinates: 31°53′23″N 83°08′47″W

Temperance is an unincorporated community in Telfair County, in the U.S. state of Georgia.

== History ==
A post office called Temperance was established in 1836, and remained in operation until 1904. The community was named for a nearby campground which hosted the Methodist temperance movement.
