= Temperance Bell, Georgia =

Unincorporated community in Georgia, U.S.

Coordinates: 33°40′34″N 83°02′53″W

Temperance Bell is an unincorporated community in Greene County, in the U.S. state of Georgia.

== History ==
A variant name was "Temperance". A post office called Temperance was established in 1823, and remained in operation until 1833. The community was named for the fact a revival of the temperance movement took place at the town site.
