= Saint Charles, Georgia =

Unincorporated community in Georgia, U.S.

Coordinates: 33°16′07″N 84°46′33″W

Saint Charles is an unincorporated community in Coweta County, in the U.S. state of Georgia.

== History ==
A post office called Saint Charles was established in 1891, and remained in operation until 1934. The Georgia General Assembly incorporated Saint Charles as a town in 1893. The town's municipal charter was repealed in 1995.
