= Shingler, Georgia =

Unincorporated community in Georgia, U.S.

Coordinates: 31°34′42″N 83°47′05″W

Shingler is an unincorporated community in Worth County, in the U.S. state of Georgia.

== History ==
The Georgia General Assembly incorporated Shingler as a town in 1912. The town's municipal charter was repealed in 1924.
