= Yonkers, Georgia =

Unincorporated community in Georgia, United States

Coordinates: 32°21′59″N 83°13′00″W

Yonkers is an unincorporated community in Dodge County, in the U.S. state of Georgia.

== History ==
The community's name may be a transfer from Yonkers, New York. A variant name was "Younker". A post office called Younker was established in 1890, and remained in operation until 1937.

The Georgia General Assembly incorporated the place as the "Town of Younker" in 1906. The town's municipal charter was repealed in 1909.
