= Temperance Billiard Hall =

Temperance Billiard Hall may refer to:

- Temperance Billiard Halls, a 1906 Lancashire company which built billiard halls in the north of England and London
  - Temperance Billiard Hall, Fulham
  - Temperance Billiard Hall, Chelsea
  - Sedge Lynn public house, originally Temperance Billiard Hall, in Chorlton-cum-Hardy
