= Norman Evans (architect) =

British architect

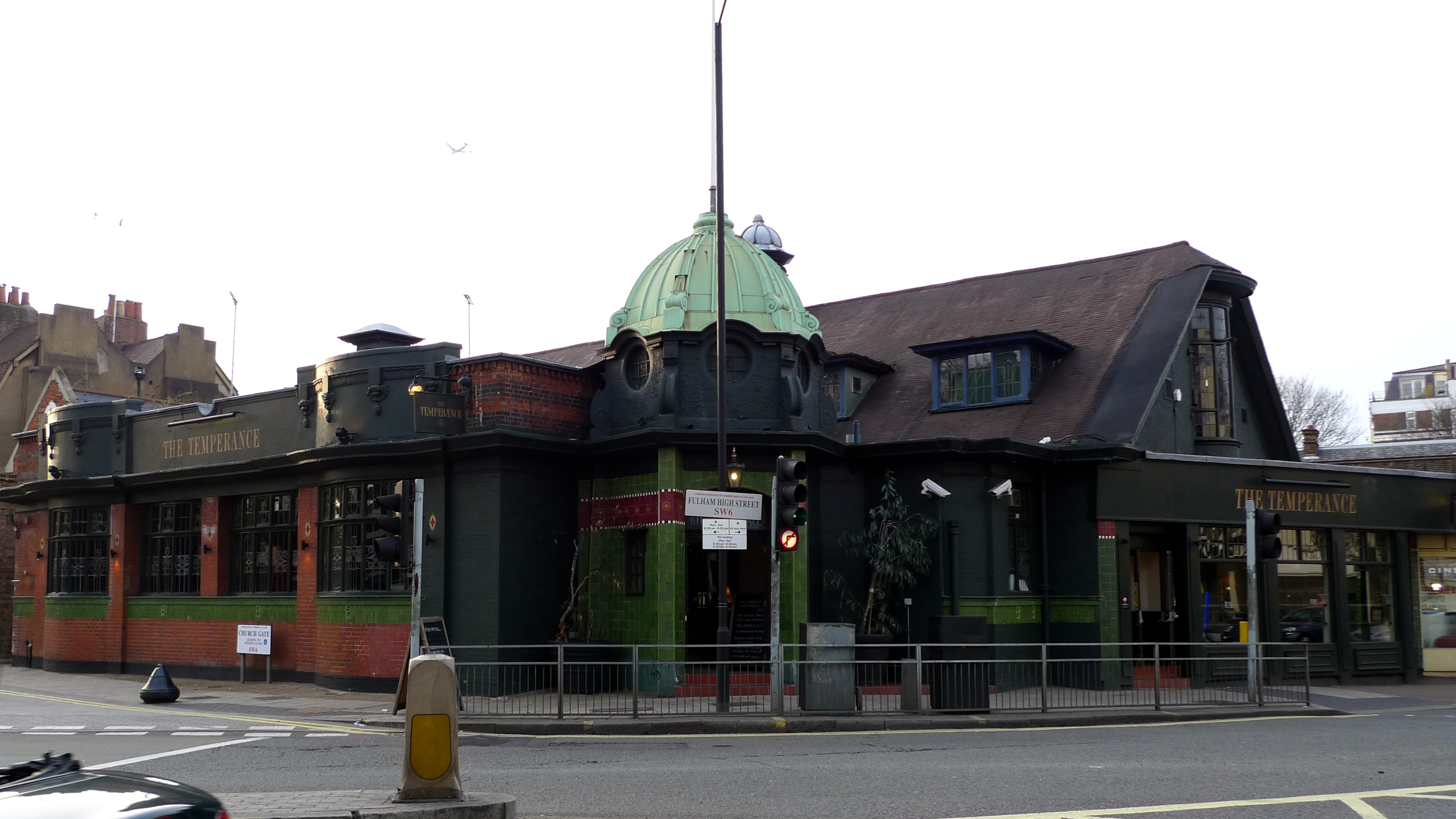
The Temperance Billiard Hall, Fulham

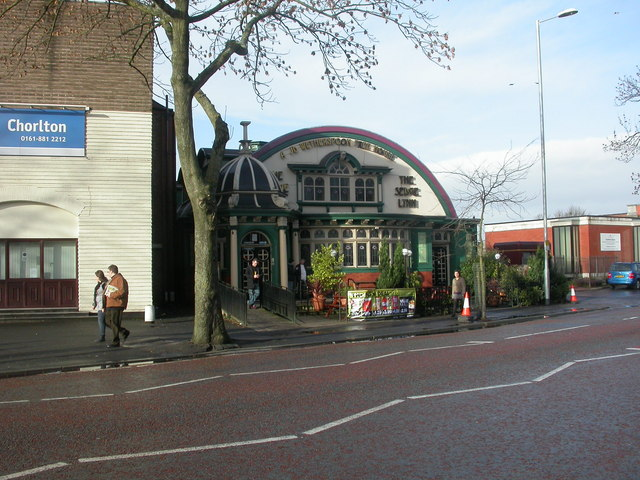
The Temperance Billiard Hall, Chorlton-cum-Hardy

Norman Evans was a British architect, best known for the dozen and a half temperance movement billiard halls he designed for the Temperance Billiard Hall Co. Ltd.

Several of these former halls designed by Evans are now Grade II listed buildings, such as the 1910 Temperance Billiard Hall, Fulham, London, now somewhat ironically a pub called The Temperance.

The Temperance Billiard Hall built in Chorlton-cum-Hardy, Manchester in 1907, also Grade II listed, is now a J D Wetherspoon pub called the Sedge Lynn.

His assistant, Thomas Somerford, later designed billiard halls for Temperance Billiard Halls in his own right, as well as cinemas and other buildings.
