= Chelsea Garage =

Historic building in Chelsea, London, England

Coordinates: 51.487903°N 0.166463°W

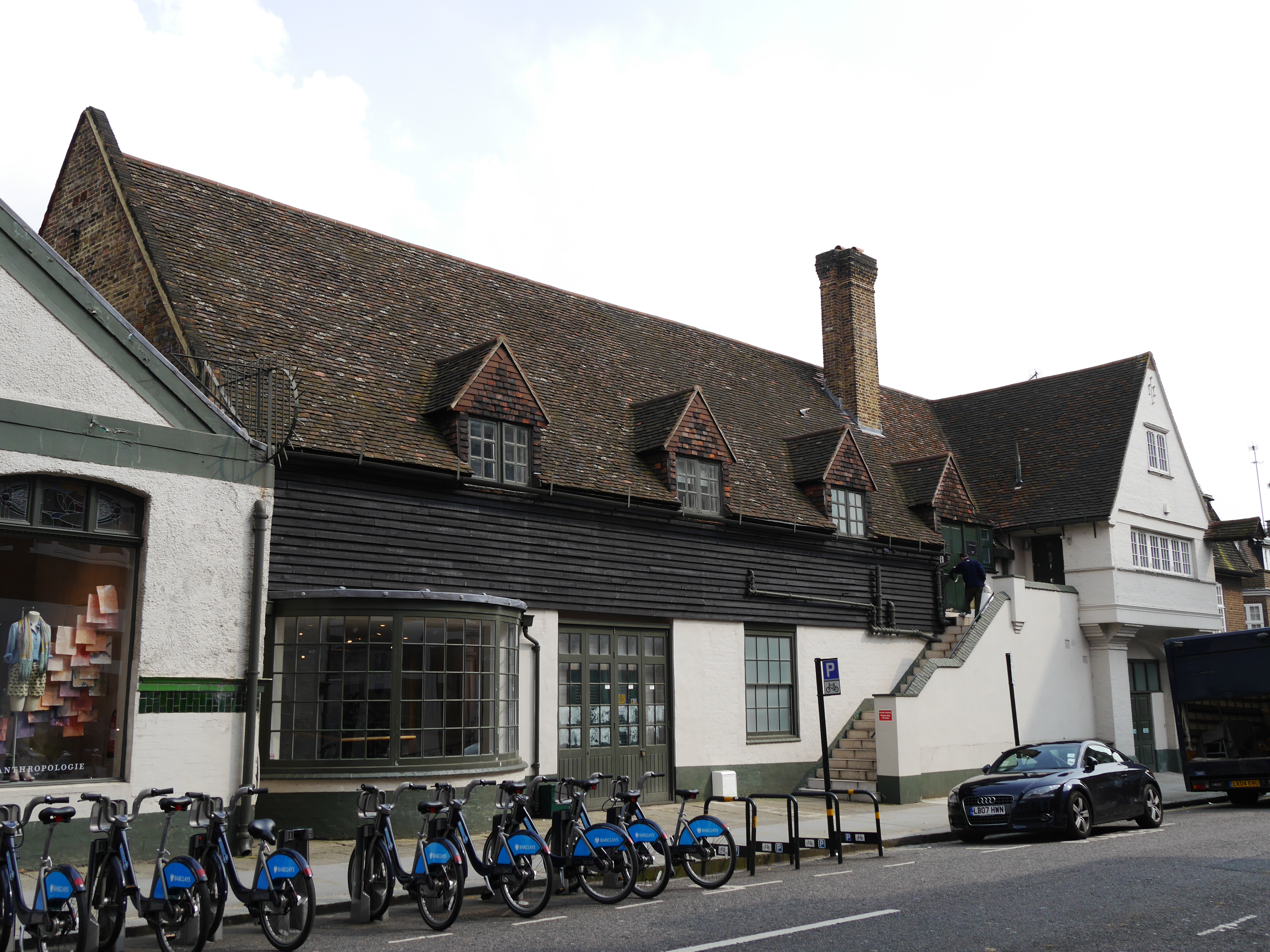
Chelsea Garage

The Chelsea Garage is a Grade II listed former motorcar garage at 15 Flood Street, Chelsea, London.

It was built in about 1919, and the architect was Ernest Coles, for Duff, Morgan and Vermont Ltd, motor engineers. It was altered in the 1960s when it was converted to an antiques centre, and later when it was connected to the former Temperance Billiard Hall in King's Road.
