= Thomas Somerford =

British architect

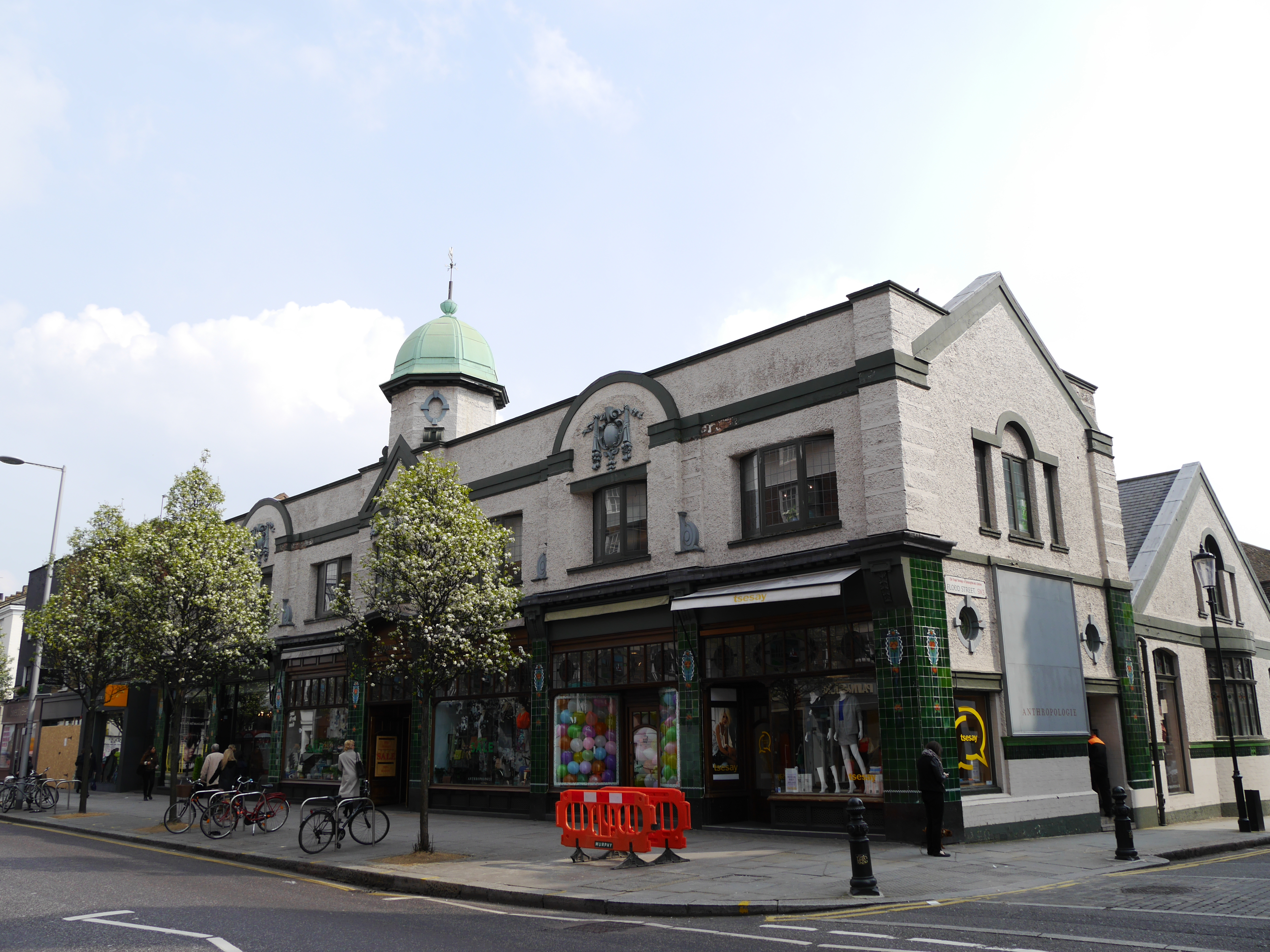
Temperance Billiard Hall, Chelsea

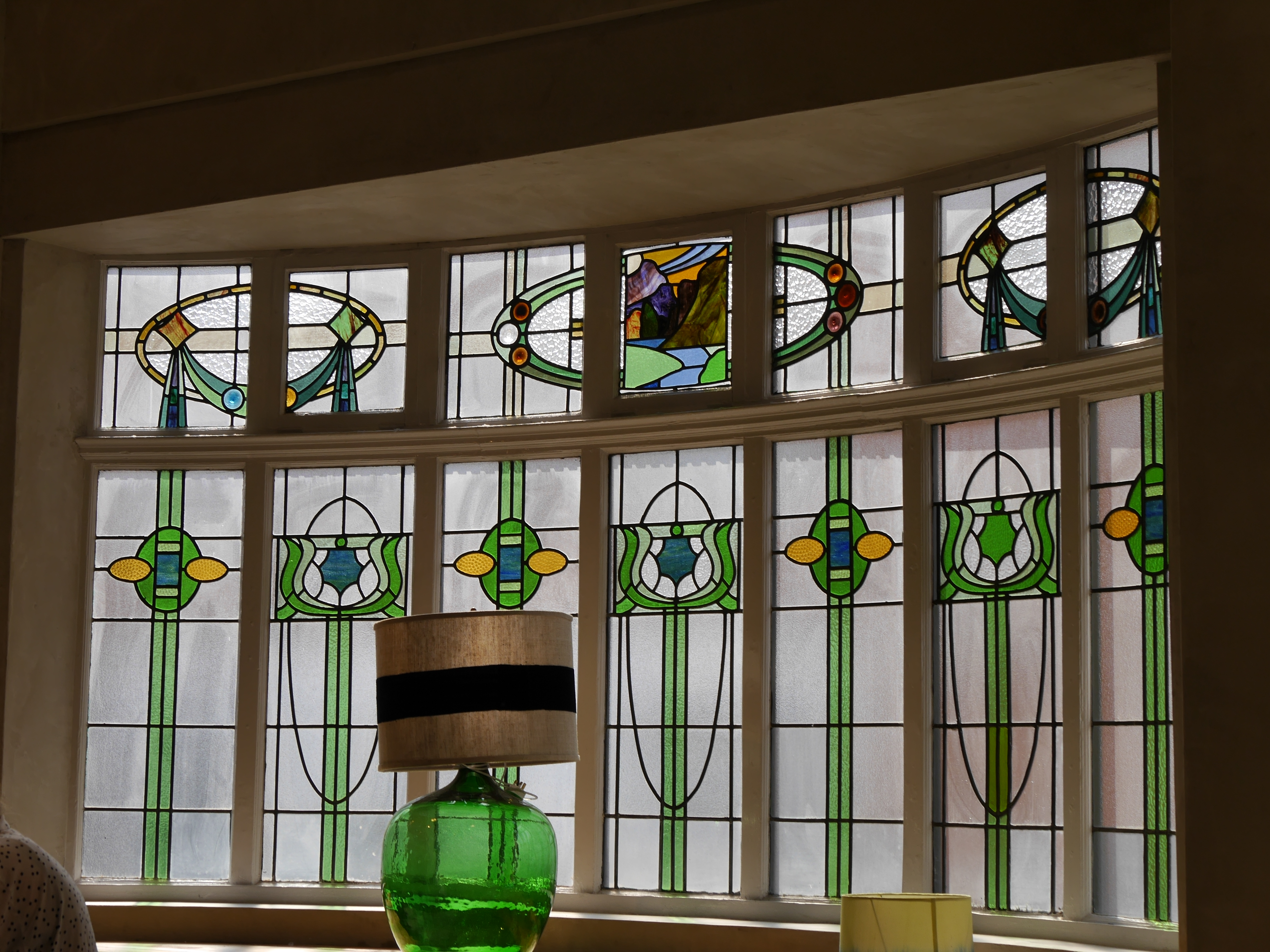
Interior

Thomas Retford Somerford (1881 - 25 June 1948) was a British architect, best known for the temperance movement billiard halls he designed for the Temperance Billiard Hall Co Ltd.

The Temperance Billiard Hall Co Ltd was a Pendleton, Lancashire company that as part of the wider temperance movement built billiard halls in the north of England and London.

Somerford was initially an assistant to Norman Evans, and later was lead architect in his own right.

Several of these former halls designed by Somerford are now Grade II listed buildings. His 1912-1914 hall at 134-141 King's Road, Chelsea, London is now a Grade II listed building. Somerford's hall at 411-417 Coldharbour Lane, Brixton, London is also still there, but the frontage has been sub-divided into a number of smaller shop units, and the upper storeys are used as a hotel.

Together with fellow architect E A Stone, he designed the Astoria in Brixton, London in 1929 (now the Brixton Academy music venue).
