= Flood Street =

Residential street in London, England

Coordinates: 51.48597°N 0.16520°W

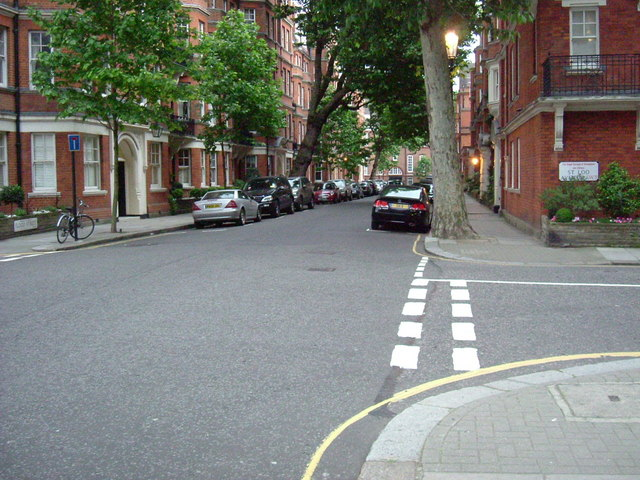
View along Flood Street at the junction with St Loo Avenue.

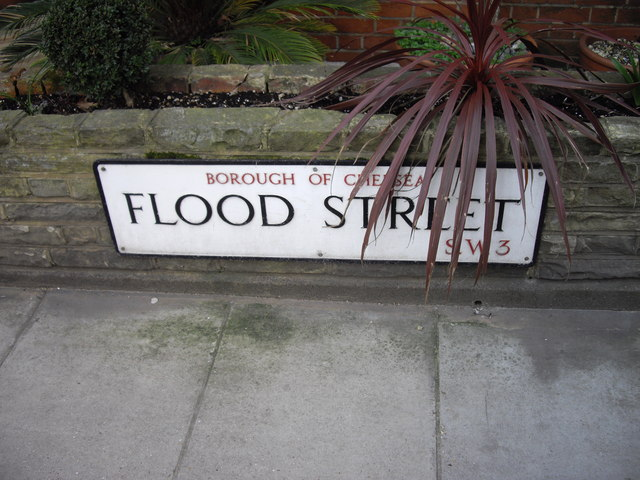
Street sign for Flood Street, Borough of Chelsea, SW3.

Flood Street is a residential street in Chelsea, London, England. It runs between King's Road to the north and Royal Hospital Road to the south. Just further to the south is the River Thames. The closest tube station is Sloane Square to the northeast. The street commemorates Luke Thomas Flood, a major Chelsea land owner and a benefactor of the poor.

The most famous resident of Flood Street (No. 19) was the former British prime minister Margaret Thatcher. The house was bought by Margaret Thatcher and her husband Denis Thatcher in 1967 and sold in 1985. She celebrated her first 1979 general election victory here. Another former resident of Flood Street was the theatrical manager, director, teacher, and actor, George Devine CBE (1910–1966).

The youngest year group, 'small school', of the notable Hill House School is educated here. The Violet Melchett Children's Centre is located at 30 Flood Street. The Coopers Arms public house is at 87 Flood Street.

The Rossetti Studios at 72 Flood Street, built as artists studios in 1894 in the Queen Anne style, are listed Grade II on the National Heritage List for England as is the former Chelsea Garage at No. 19.
