= Temperance Billiard Hall, Chelsea =

Coordinates: 51.4882°N 0.1664°W

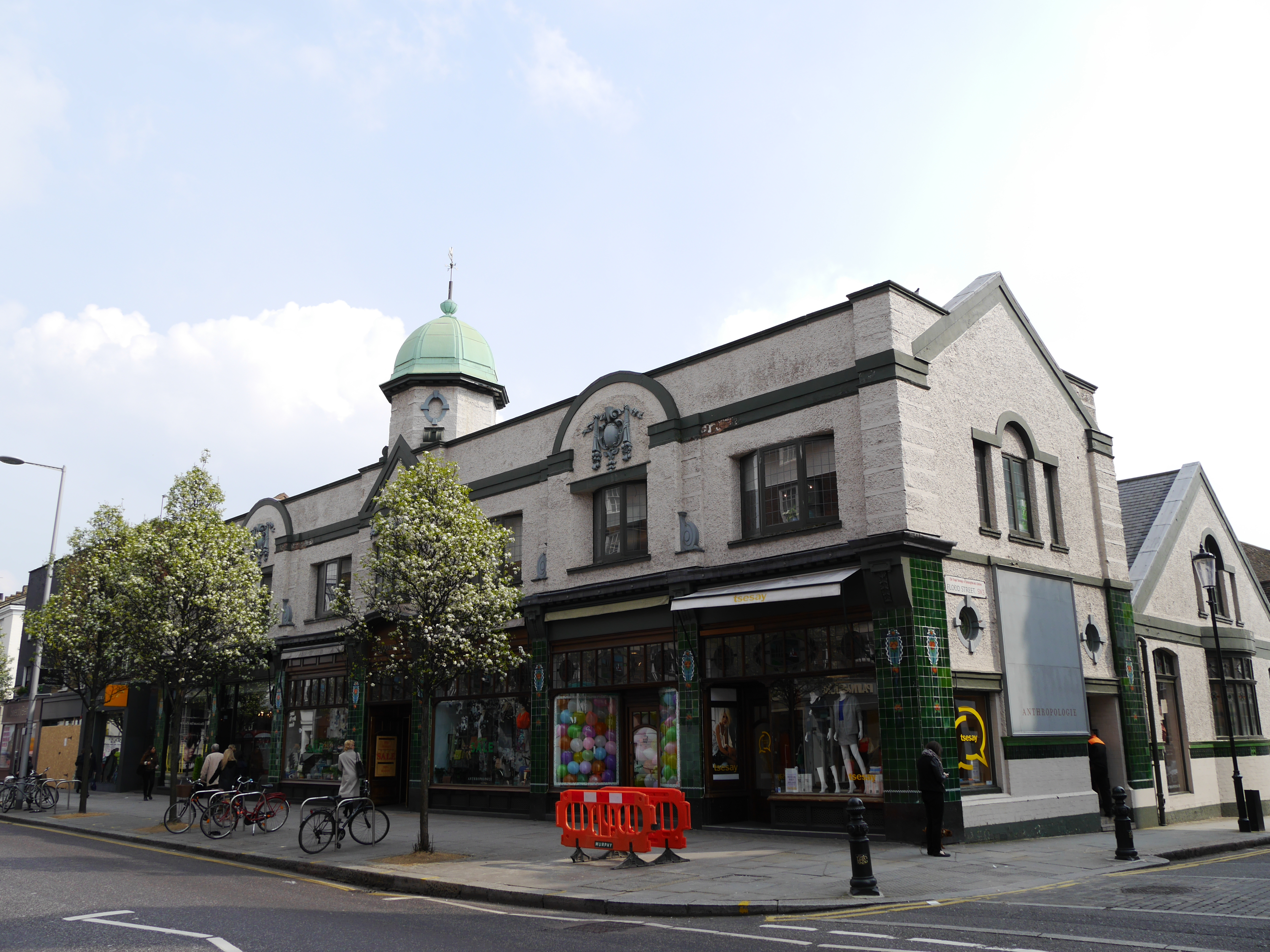
Temperance Billiard Hall, Chelsea

The Temperance Billiard Hall at 131–141 King's Road, Chelsea, London, is a Grade II listed building with English Heritage.

It was built around 1912–14 to a design by Thomas Retford Somerford for Temperance Billiards Halls Ltd., and became an antiques centre in the 1960s. It is still retail premises. It is now connected to the former Chelsea Garage in 15 Flood Street, which is also Grade II listed.

== Gallery ==
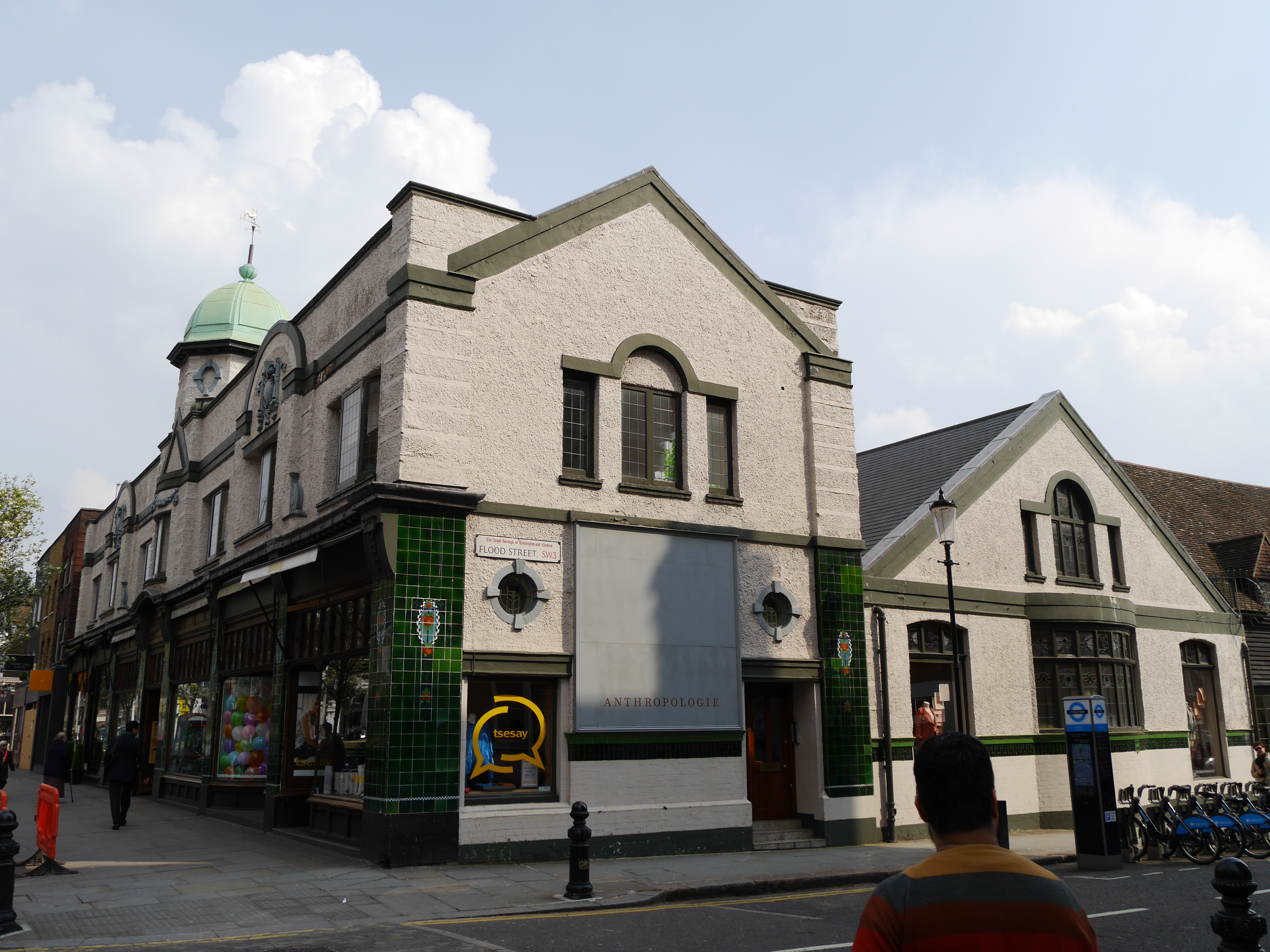
Side view

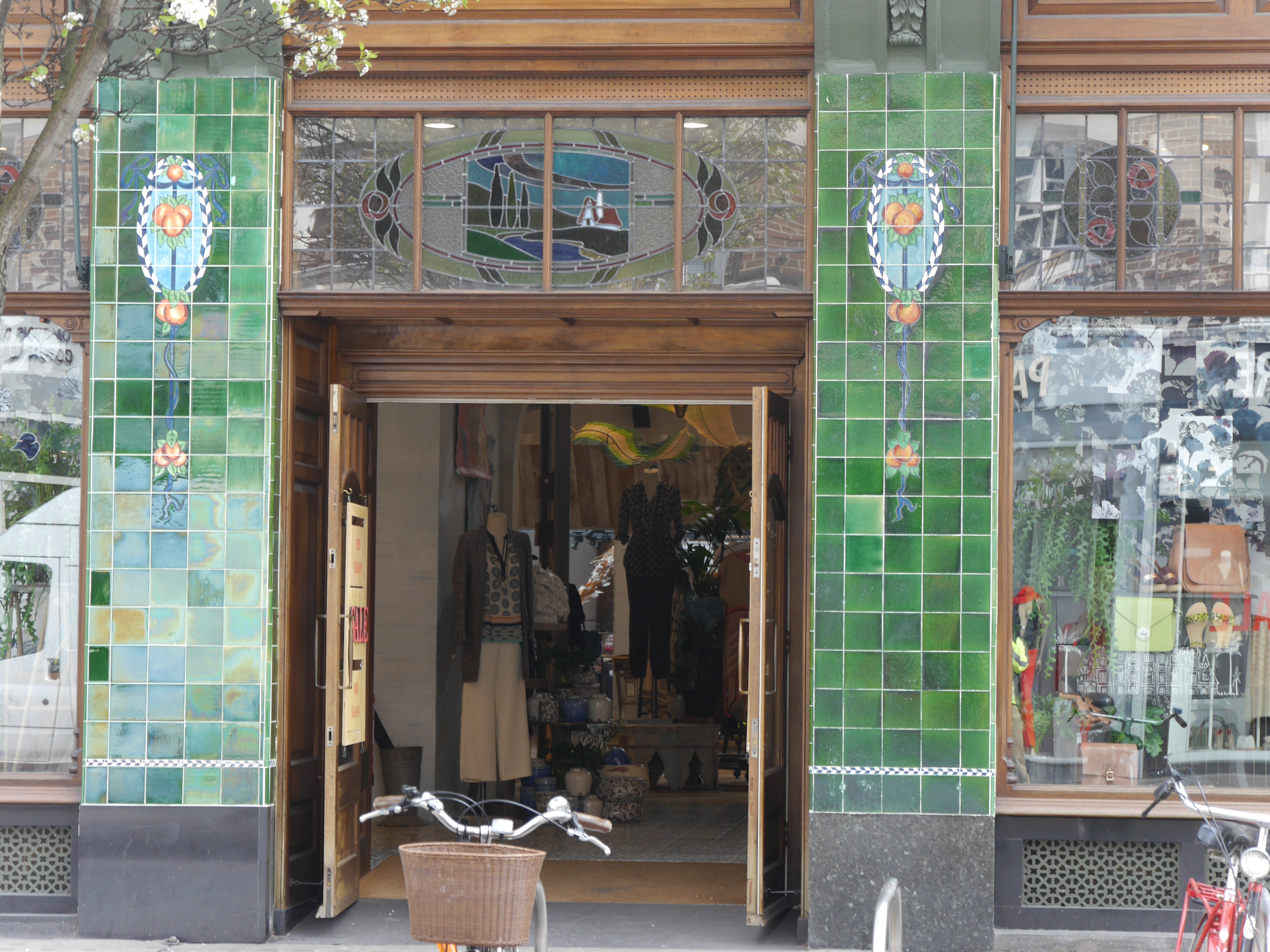
Entrance

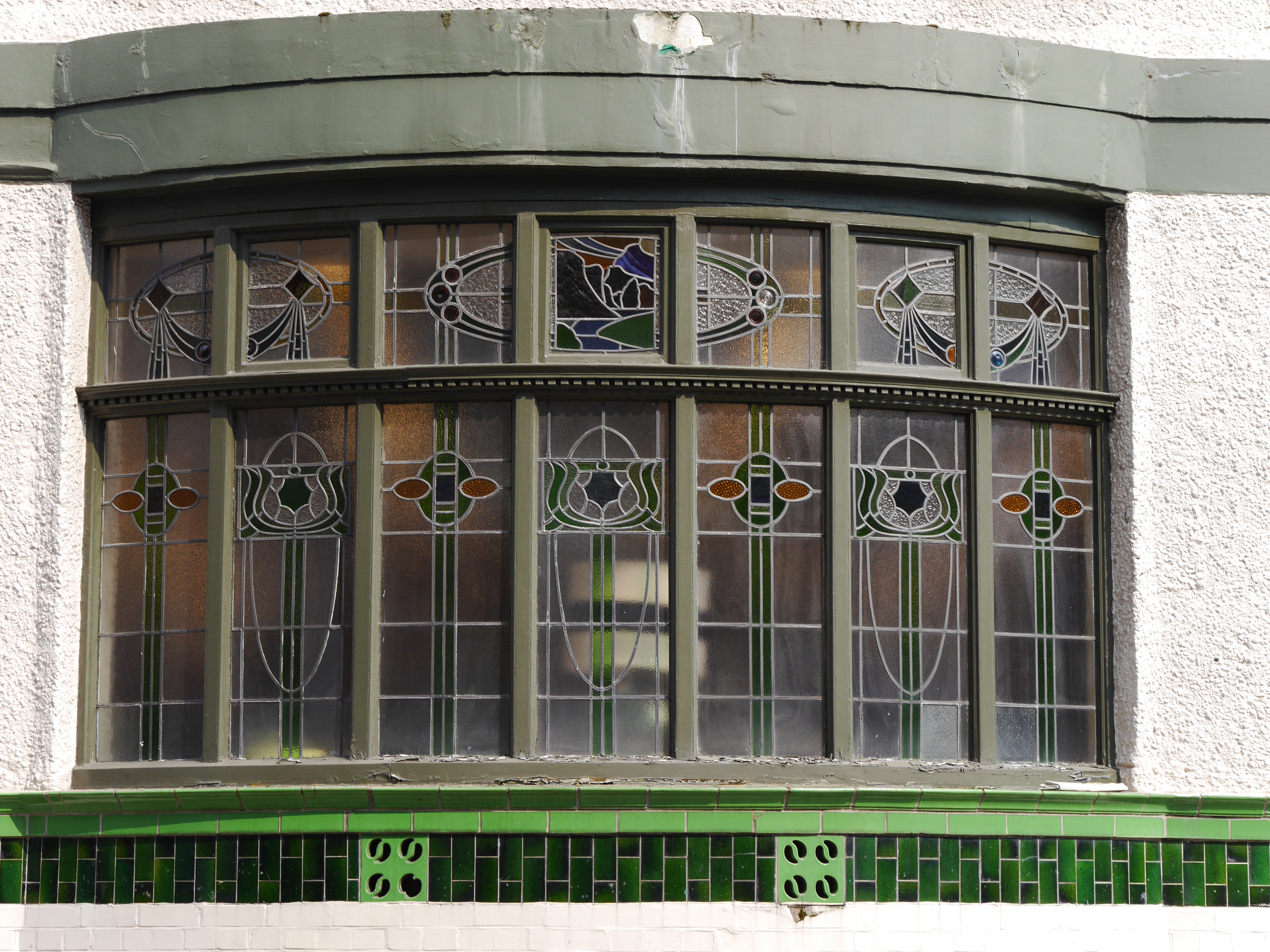
Exterior stained glass

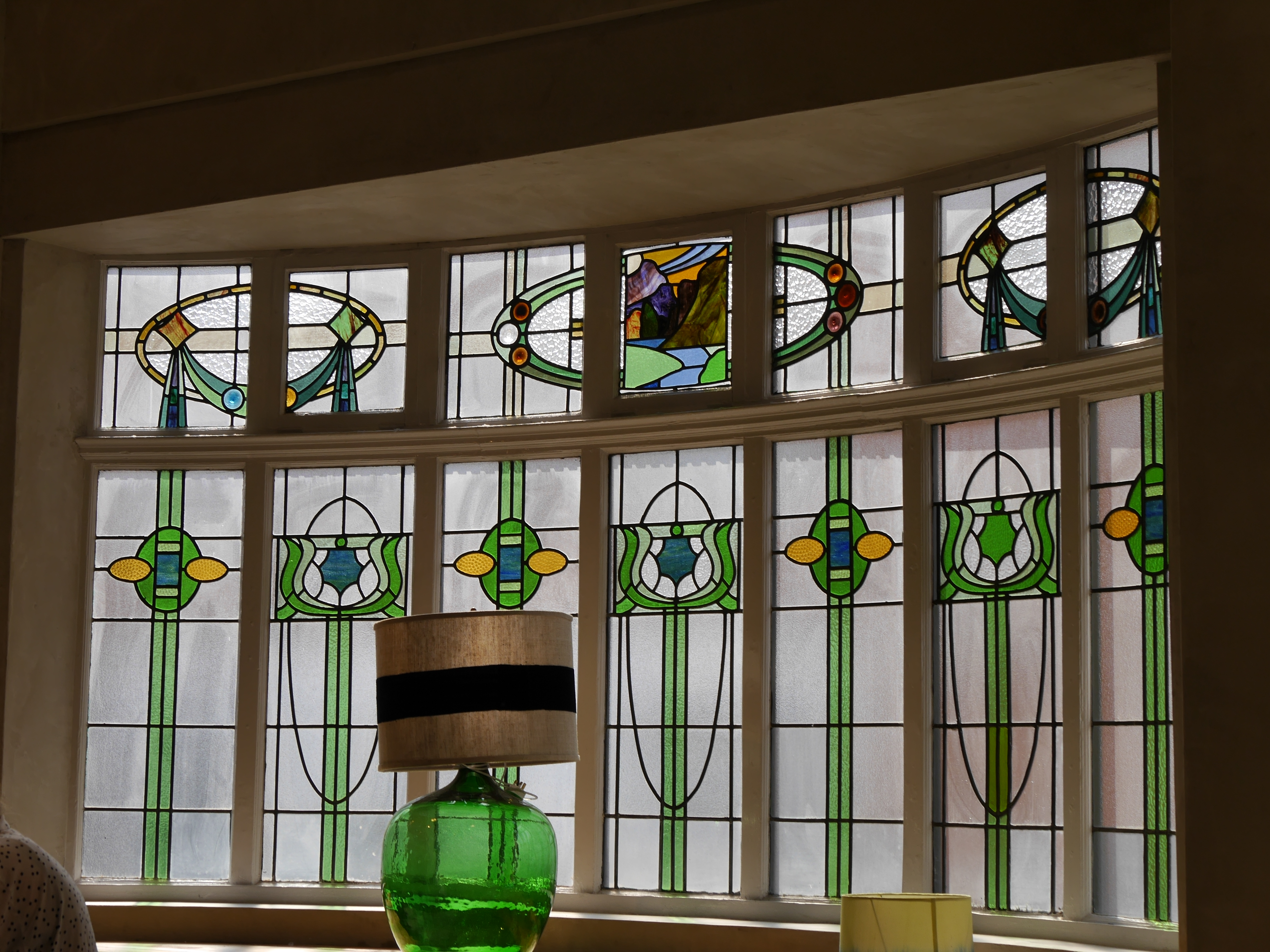
Interior of the same window

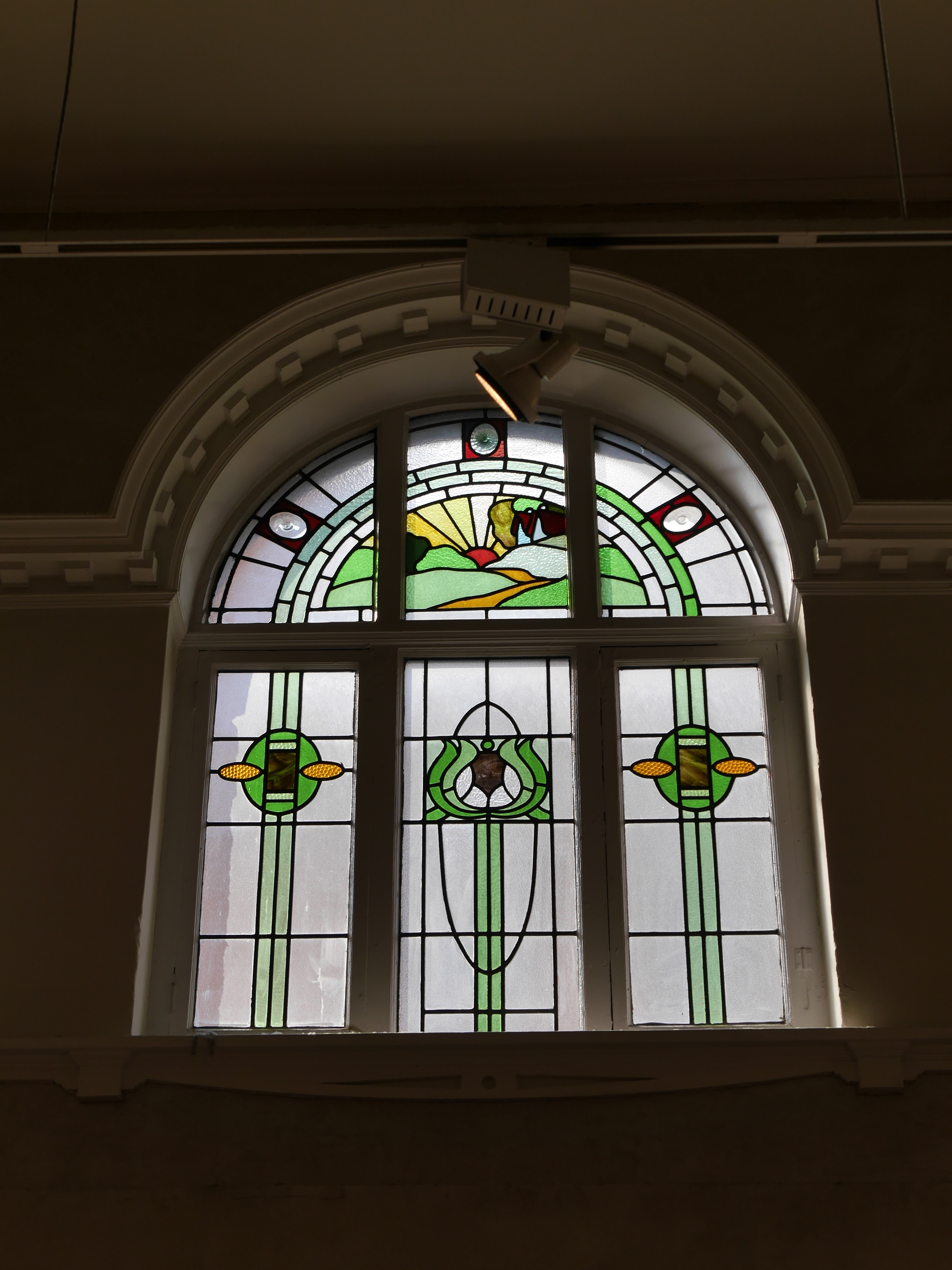
Stained glass window

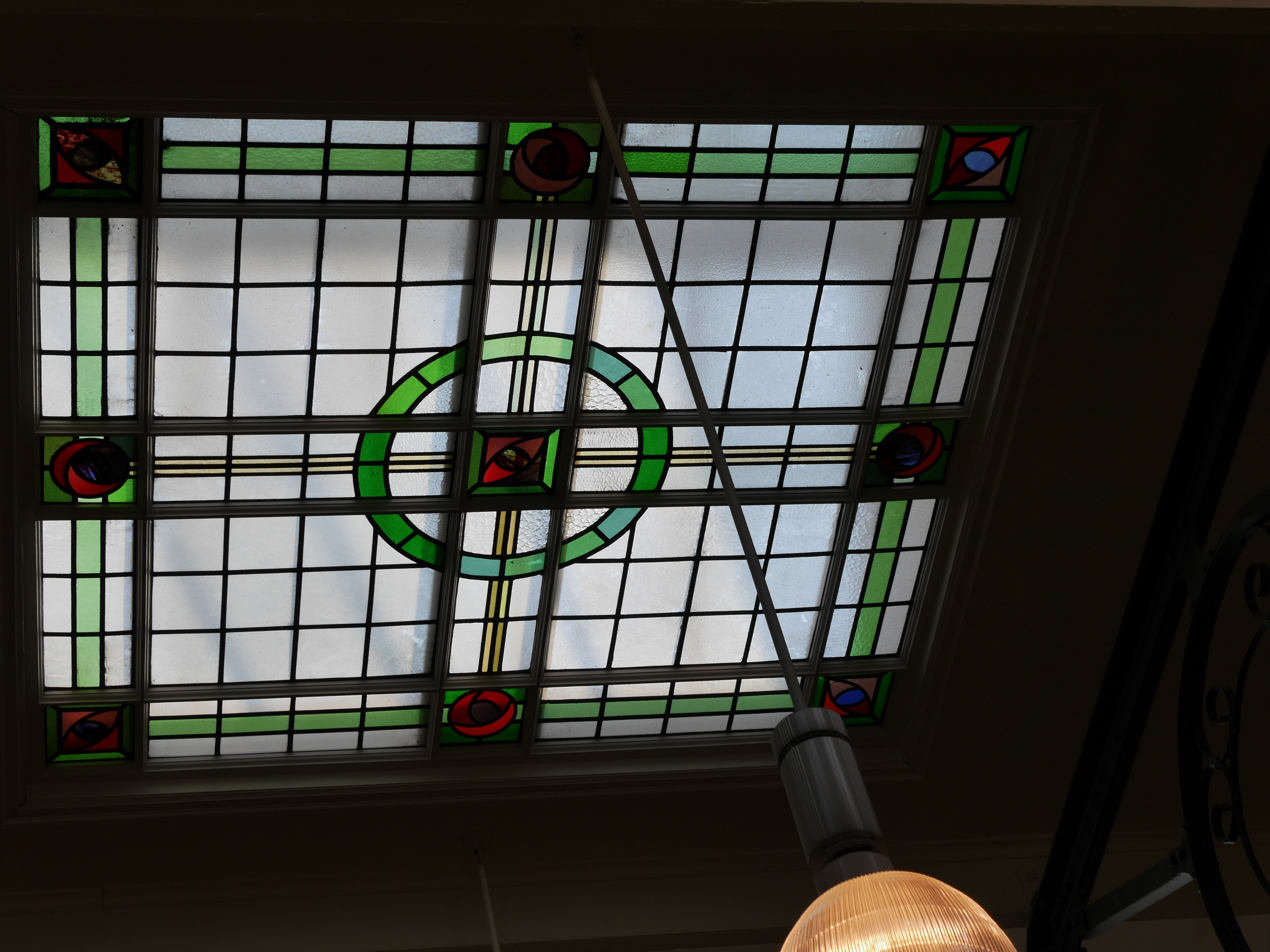
Stained glass skylight

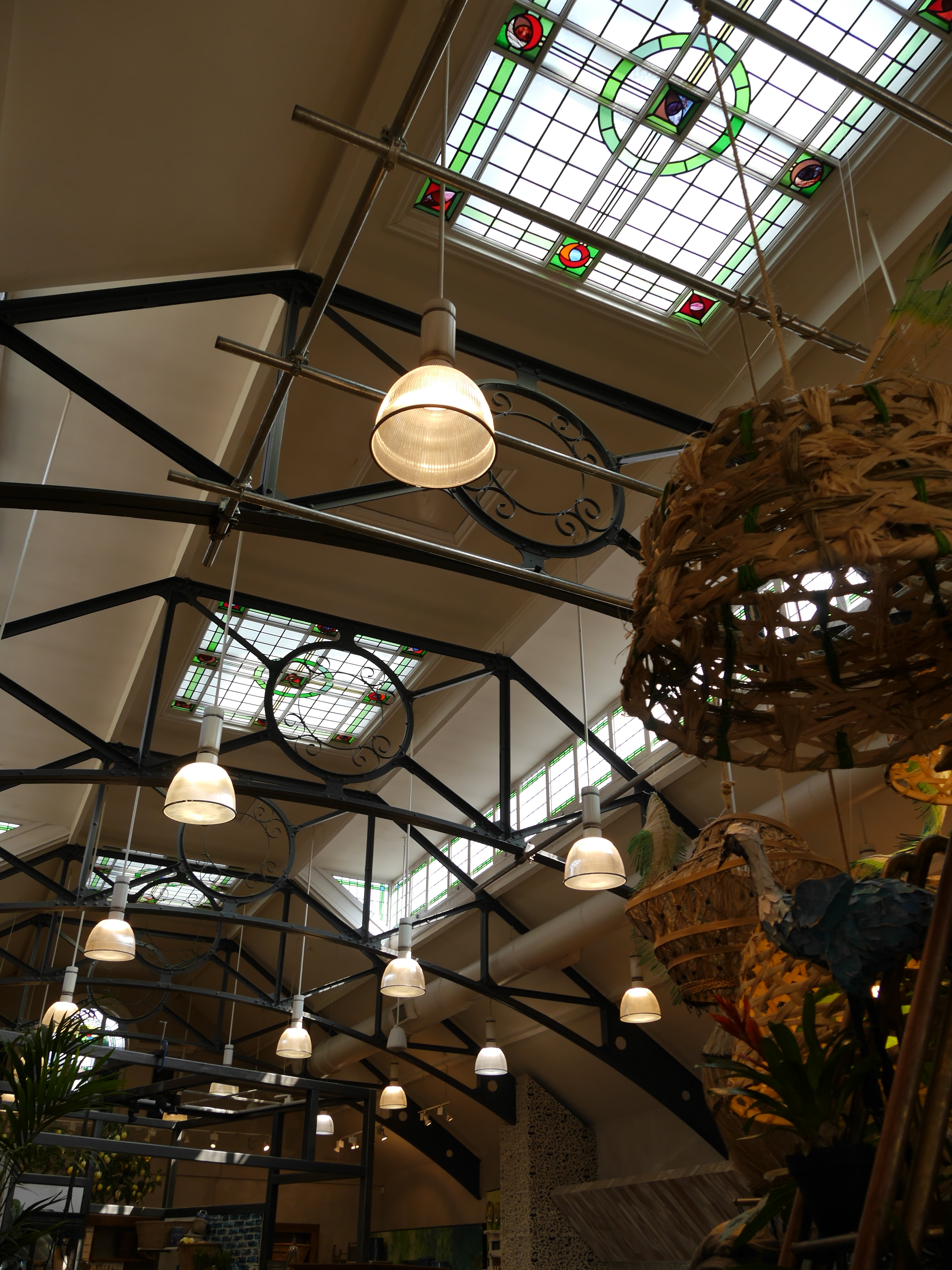
Roof supports
