= Temperance Billiard Hall, Fulham =

Pub in Fulham, London

Coordinates: 51.4694°N 0.2105°W

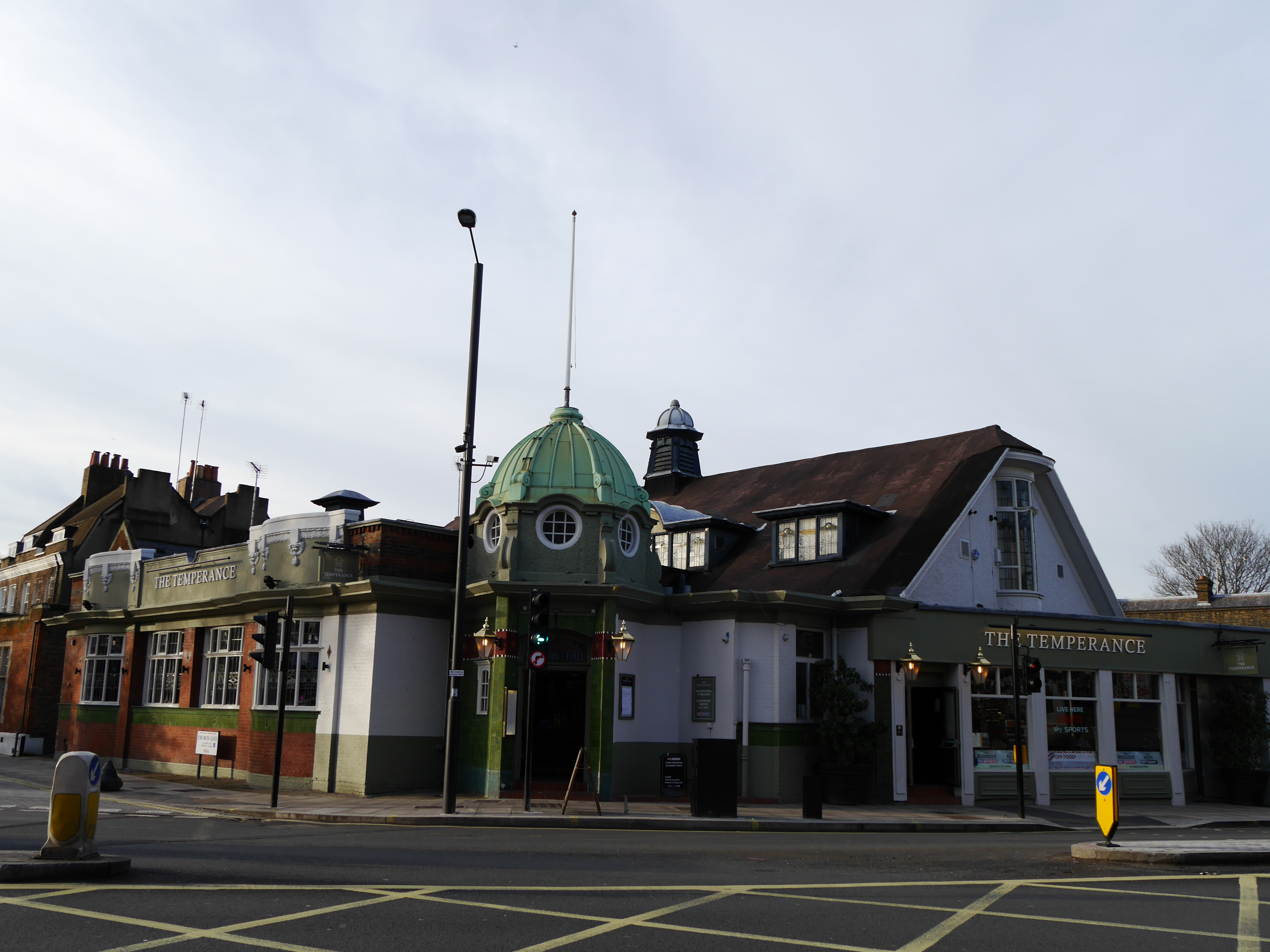
The Temperance, 2014

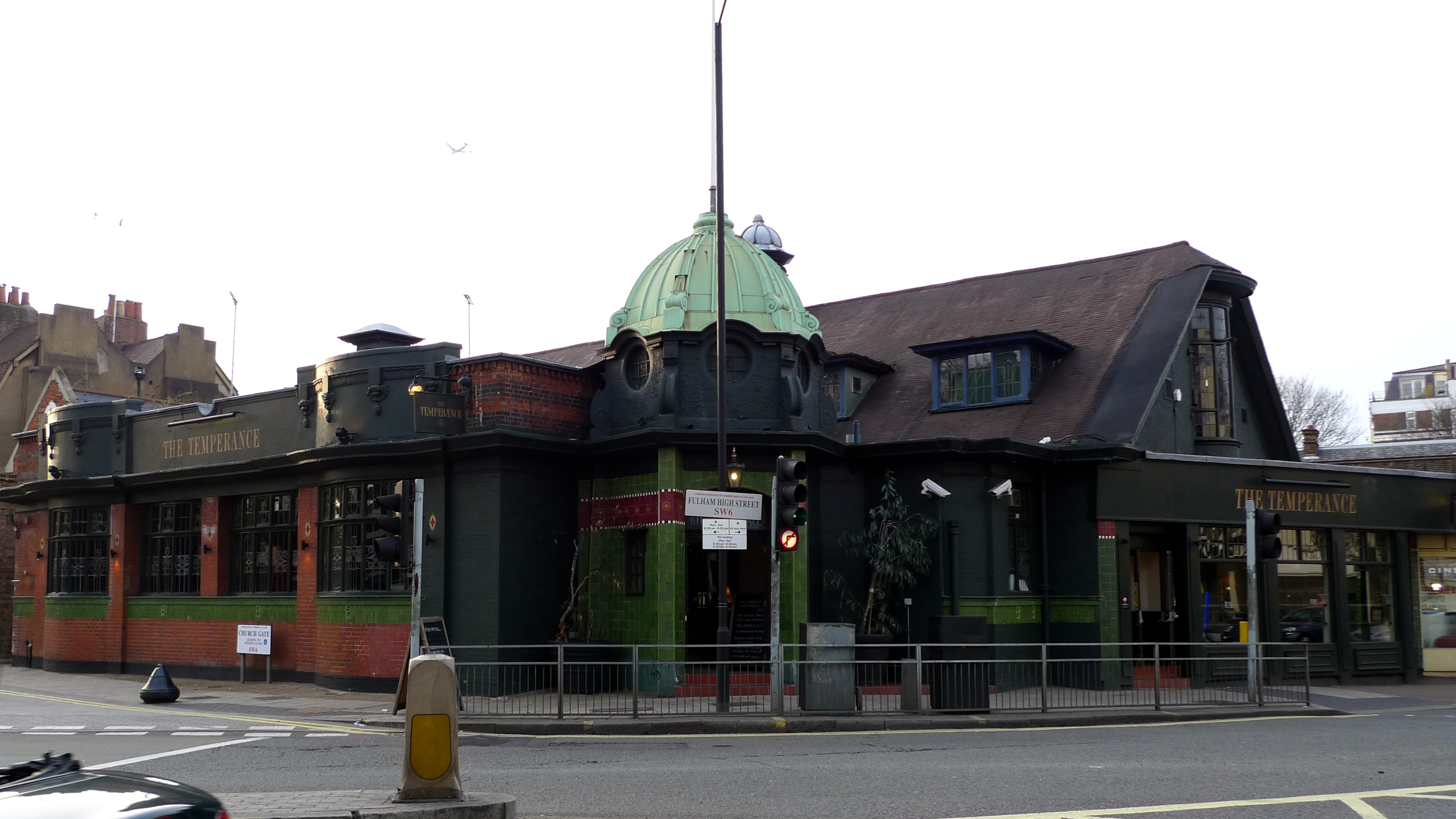
The Temperance, 2009

The Temperance Billiard Hall, now a pub called The Temperance, is a Grade II listed building at 90 Fulham High Street, Fulham, London.

It was built in 1910, and the architect was Norman Evans.

It was built for a company called Temperance Billiard Halls Ltd, who built a number of such halls in London and the north of England. The temperance movement urged the reduced or prohibited use of alcoholic beverages.

It was previously part of the chain O'Neill's, and before that was part of the Firkin Brewery chain and known as the Pharaoh and Firkin.
