= Temperance Billiard Halls =

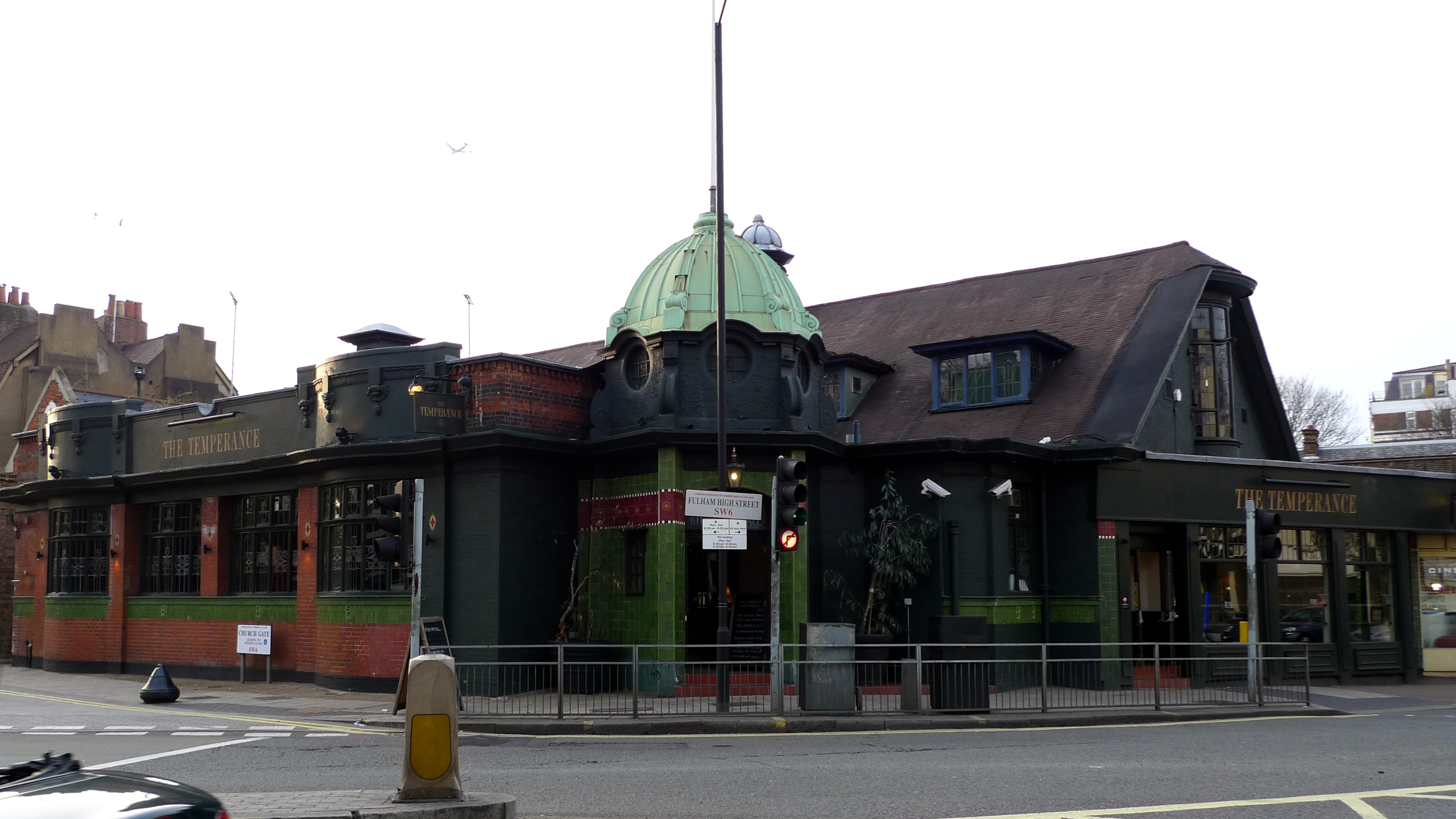
The Temperance Billiard Hall, Fulham

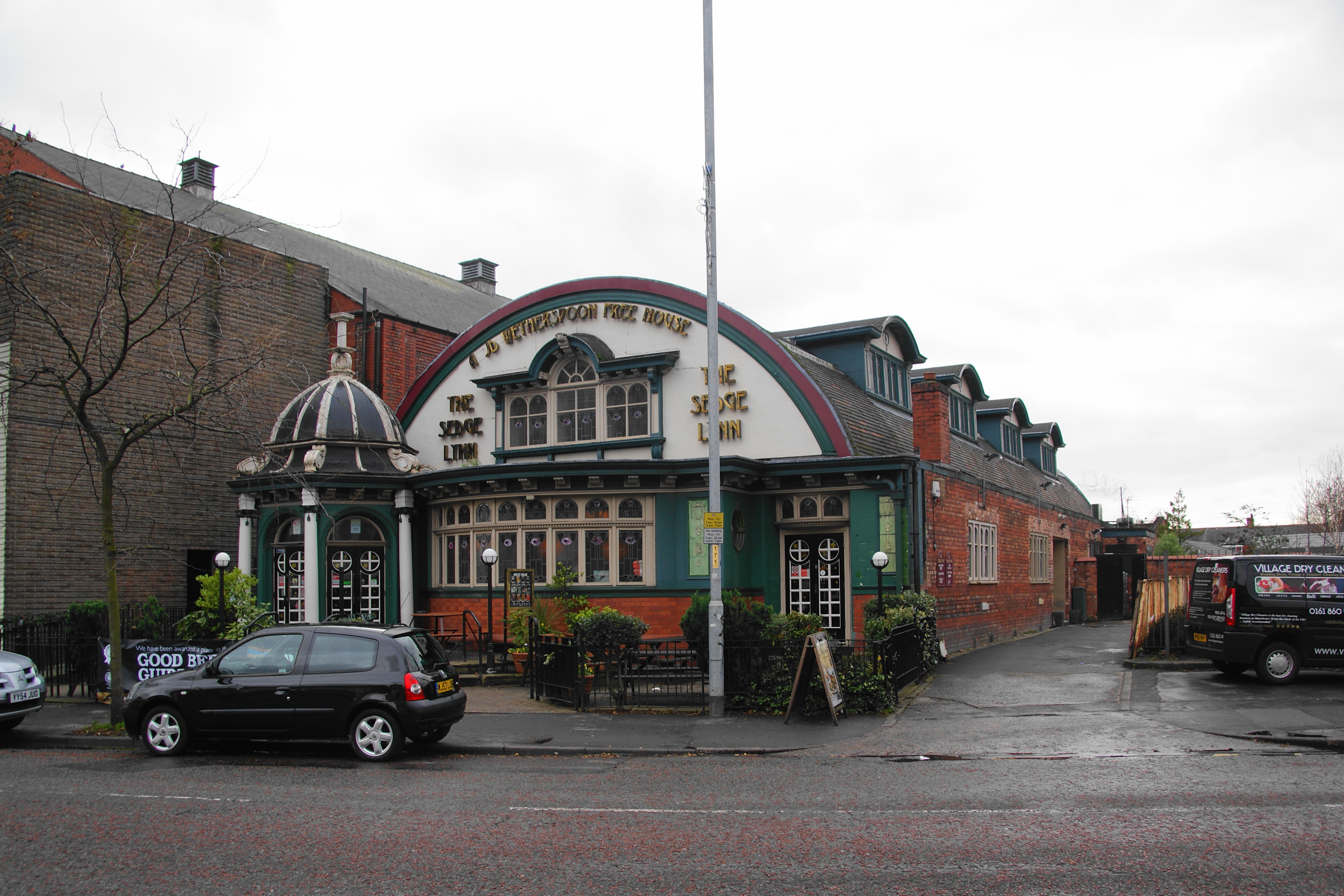
The former Temperance Billiard Hall, Chorlton-cum-Hardy

Temperance Billiard Hall Co. Ltd. was a company founded in 1906 in Pendleton, Lancashire, as part of the wider temperance movement, which built billiard halls in the north of England and London.

Several of the former halls are now Grade II listed buildings, such as the 1910 Temperance Billiard Hall, Fulham, London, now somewhat ironically a pub called The Temperance.

The Temperance Billiard Hall built in Chorlton-cum-Hardy, Manchester, in 1907, also Grade II listed, is now a J D Wetherspoon pub called the Sedge Lynn.

Their first in-house architect was Norman Evans, who designed a dozen and a half halls from 1906 to 1911, including both of the halls mentioned above.

Thomas Retford Somerford (sometimes noted mistakenly as T. G. Somerford) was their second architect. His 1912-1914 hall at 134-141 King's Road, Chelsea, London is now a Grade II listed building. Somerford's hall at 411-417 Coldharbour Lane, Brixton, London is also still there, but the frontage has been sub-divided into a number of smaller shop units, and the upper storeys are used as a hotel.

== Locations (July 1958) ==
=== London ===
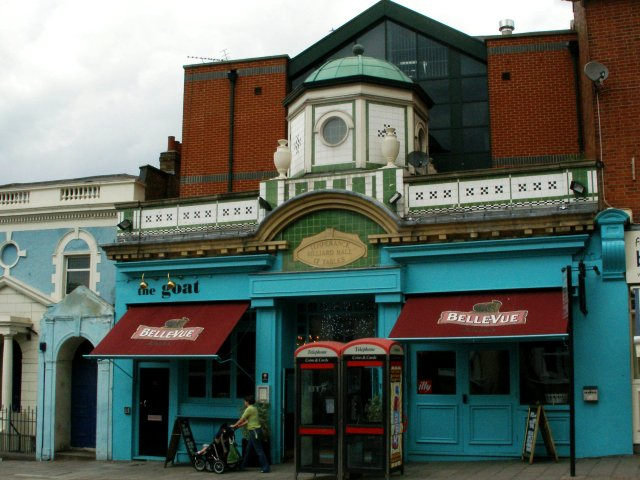
The former Temperance Billiard Hall in Battersea Rise

- Acton: 27 King Street
- Battersea: 66 Battersea Rise (illustrated)

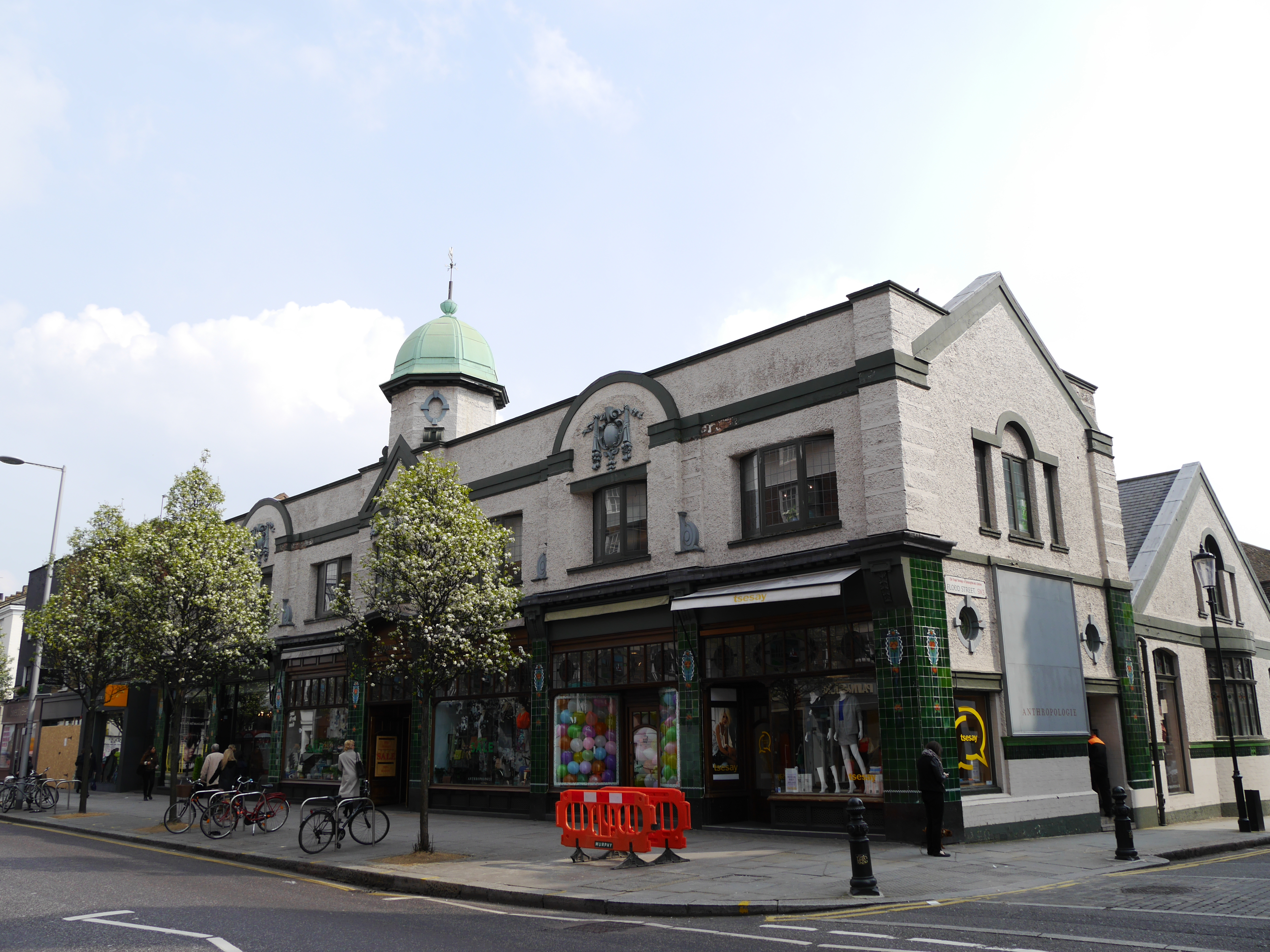
The Temperance Billiard Hall, Chelsea

- Chelsea: 131 King's Road (illustrated)
- Clapham: 47 Clapham High Street (illustrated)
- Croydon: 16 Katherine Street
- Ealing: 34/42 Bond Street
- Fulham: 90 High St
- Hammersmith: 150 King Street
- Highbury: 12 Highbury Corner
- Hounslow: 1 High Street
- Ilford: 257 High Road

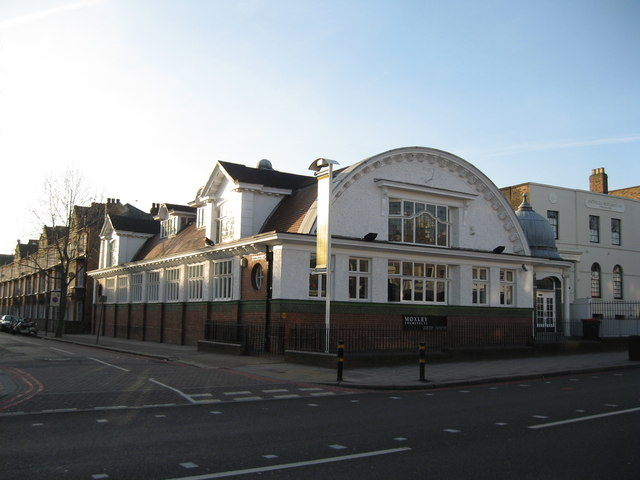
47 Clapham High Street (formerly a temperance billiard hall)

- Kingston: 17/19 Fife Road
- Lavender Hill: 638/640 Wandsworth Road
- Lewisham: 237 High Street
- Morden: 36 Aberconway Road
- Putney: 118 High Street
- Richmond: 6 Red Lion Street
- Streatham: 42 Streatham High Road
- Tooting Bec: 2a Lynwood Road
- Twickenham: 1 Richmond Road
- Victoria: 104/112 Buckingham Palace Road
- Walthamstow: Hoe Street, E17 (also known as the Queen's)
- Wimbledon: 111 The Broadway
- Wood Green: 1/3 High Road

=== Sussex ===
- Worthing: 12 Bath Place

=== Greater Manchester ===
- Eccles: Liverpool Road
- Oldham: Union Street
- Rochdale: Nelson Street
- Urmston: Station Road

==== Manchester ====
- Cheetham Hill: Cheetham Hill Road
- Chorlton: Manchester Road
- Gorton: Hyde Road
- Harpurhey: Rochdale Road
- Moss Side: Moss Lane East
- Rusholme: Wilmslow Road
