= William Morrill Wadley =

American Railroad Engineer

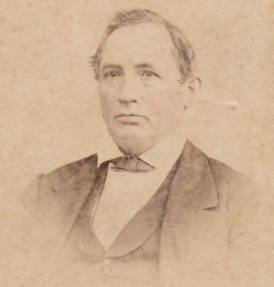
- Wadley, pictured around 1880
- Born: November 12, 1813; Brentwood, New Hampshire, U.S.
- Died: August 10, 1882 (aged 68); Saratoga, New York, U.S.
- Resting place: Wadley Cemetery, Bolingbroke, Georgia, U.S.
- Occupation: Railroad engineer
- Spouse: Rebecca Barnard Everingham (m. 1840)

William Morrill Wadley (November 12, 1813 – August 10, 1882) was a railroad engineer, and the superintendent of several railroad projects in the Southern United States in the mid-19th century.

== Life and career ==
Wadley was born in 1813, in Brentwood, New Hampshire, to Dole and Sarah Colcord Wadley. His father had changed the spelling of the family name from Wadleigh to Wadley, hence his branch of the family is the only one with the spelling as such.

He moved south to Georgia aged 20, settling in Great Hill Place in 1834. He named the plantation after the place of his birth in New Hampshire.

In 1840, he married Rebecca Barnard Everingham, daughter of John Everingham and Sarah Weber Barnard, with whom he had nine children: William Oconius (born 1841), Sarah Lois (1844), John Dole (1846), Mary Millen (1848), Rebecca Everingham (1850), an unnamed daughter (1852), Loring Reynolds (1853), George Dole (1857) and John Everingham (1860). John Dole and the unnamed daughter died in infancy.

Wadley worked as a blacksmith's striker on Cockspur Island, Georgia, where he helped build Fort Pulaski under the command of Confederate Army general Robert E. Lee. He became the superintendent of the island's public works during this time. He also built a bridge over the Savannah River and the Savannah–Ogeechee Canal, and over the Oconee River for the Central of Georgia Railway.

Between 1844 and 1849, he was a roadmaster, then superintendent for a further two years. He oversaw the construction of the roundhouse in Savannah, Georgia, designed by Augustus Schwaab, which is still standing today as part of the Georgia State Railroad Museum. It was listed on the National Register of Historic Places in 1978.

In 1852, he was installed as superintendent of the Western and Atlantic Railroad, but returned to the Central of Georgia Railway in that role the following year.

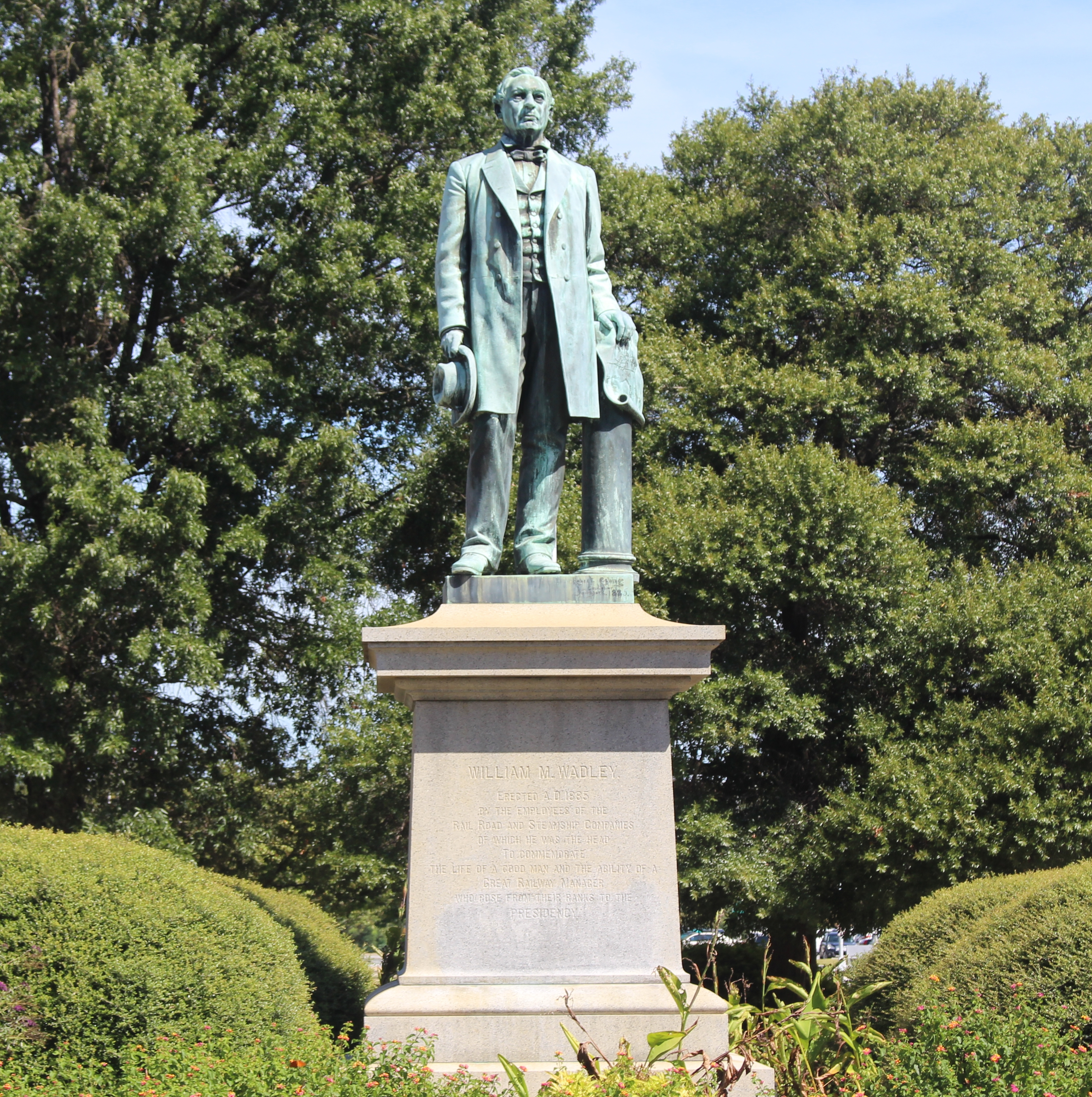
Wadley's statue at Terminal Station in Macon, Georgia. He is holding a railroad map in his left hand

He became an officer in the century-old Union Society in 1856.

The New Orleans, Jackson and Great Northern Railroad hired him as superintendent in 1858. Over the next two years, he was in charge of the construction of what became the Columbus and Greenville Railway. He moved onto the Vicksburg, Shreveport and Pacific Railway between 1860 and 1861.

On August 29, 1863, during the Civil War, an officer was ordered to destroy all of the Vicksburg, Shreveport and Pacific Railroad machinery at Wadley's plantation, to prevent its falling into Union hands.

Wadley was appointed as colonel in the Adjutant General's department of the Confederate Army between November 1862 and May 1863. His duties were to supervise and direct the transportation of the Confederacy on all of its railroads. The Confederate States Congress did not officially recognize his appointment and his commission was terminated.

After the war, Wadley returned to Georgia, where he became president of the Central of Georgia Railway. He occupied the role from 1866 until his death.

== Death ==
Wadley died in 1882, aged 68. He collapsed in the street in Saratoga, New York, while he was with his wife and a son. He had been in poor health beforehand. His body was transported to New York City in a private railroad car of William Henry Vanderbilt's. From there, a special car brought him to Bolingbroke, Georgia, via Atlanta.

He is interred in the Wadley family cemetery in Bolingbroke, under a grove of trees near his house at Great Hill Place. His wife joined him there upon her death in 1905.

A bronze statue to Wadley was erected in Macon, Georgia, on June 18, 1885. The work of New York sculptor Robert Cushing, it stands beside the city's Terminal Station. The base of the statue was vandalized in 2016. A marble bust of Wadley, made the year following his death, is within W. B. Hodgson Hall in Savannah.
