= Great Hill =

Great Hill may refer to:

- Great Hill (England)
- Great Hill (Scottish Borders)
- Great Hill Place, Georgia
- Great Hill (Central Park), New York City
- Great Hill (Acton, Massachusetts)
