= Drumgoole =

Drumgoole is a surname. Notable people with the surname include:

- George Drumgoole Coleman (1795–1844), Irish architect
- Jenny Drumgoole, American video artist
- John Christopher Drumgoole (1816–1888), Irish American Roman Catholic priest
- Noel Drumgoole (1931–1995), Irish hurler

== See also ==
- Drumgoole Plaza, a park in Manhattan, New York
