= Old Church of St. Joachim and St. Anne =

Roman Catholic church building in NYC

Coordinates: 40°30′42″N 74°13′15″W

The Former Church of St. Joachim and St. Anne
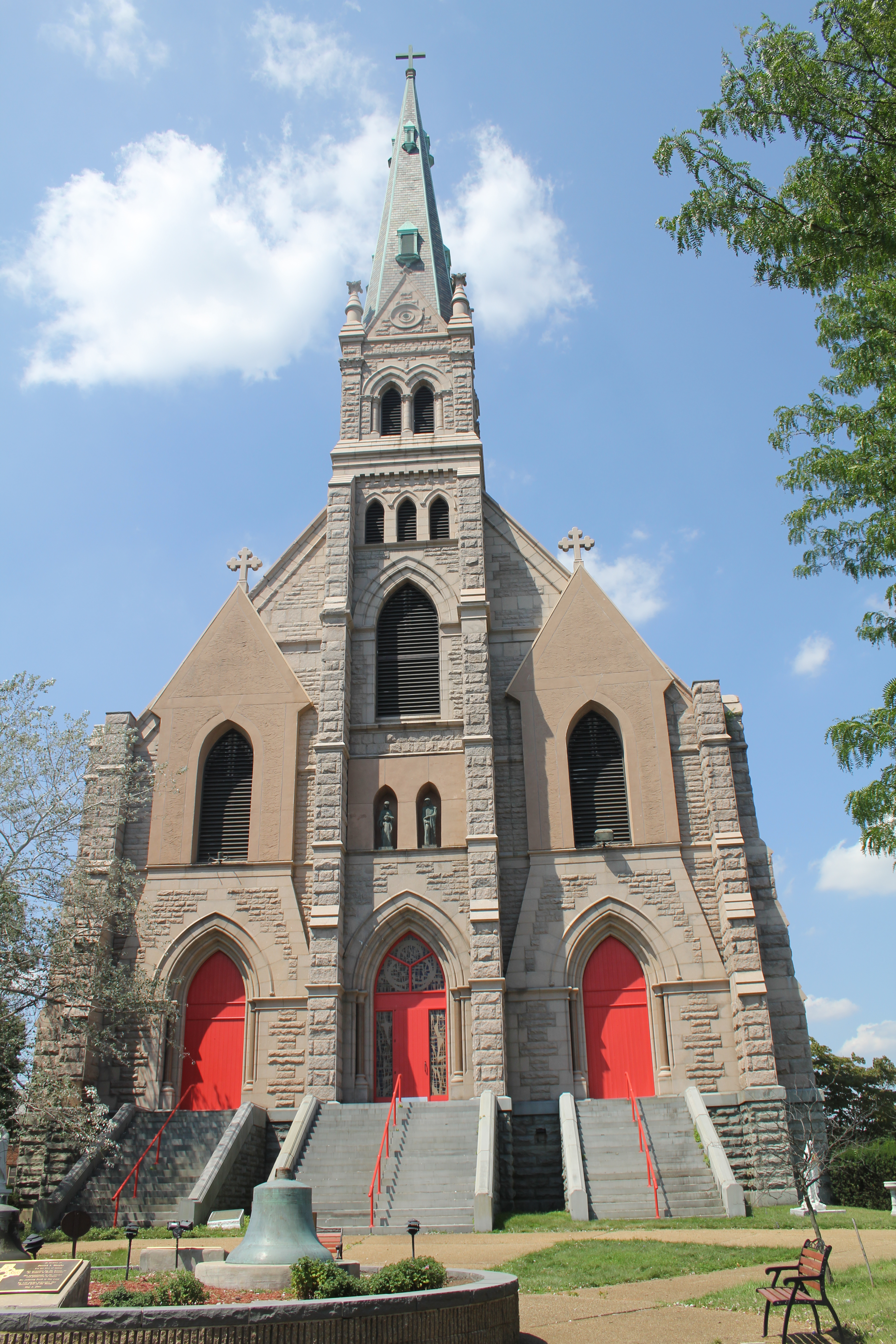
- The facade of the church, built in 1891

General information
- Location: Staten Island, New York, United States
- Completed: c.1891
- Client: Archdiocese of New York

Technical details
- Structural system: Masonry

Design and construction
- Architect: Benjamin E. Lowe

The Old Church of St. Joachim and St. Anne, also known as Mount Loretto Church, is a historic Catholic church building located in the Pleasant Plains area of Staten Island in New York City. It is located north of Hylan Boulevard between Richard Avenue and Sharrott Avenue, in the southern part of the island, near the Atlantic Ocean and Tottenville. At 225 feet (69 m), it is the tallest building in Staten Island.

== History ==
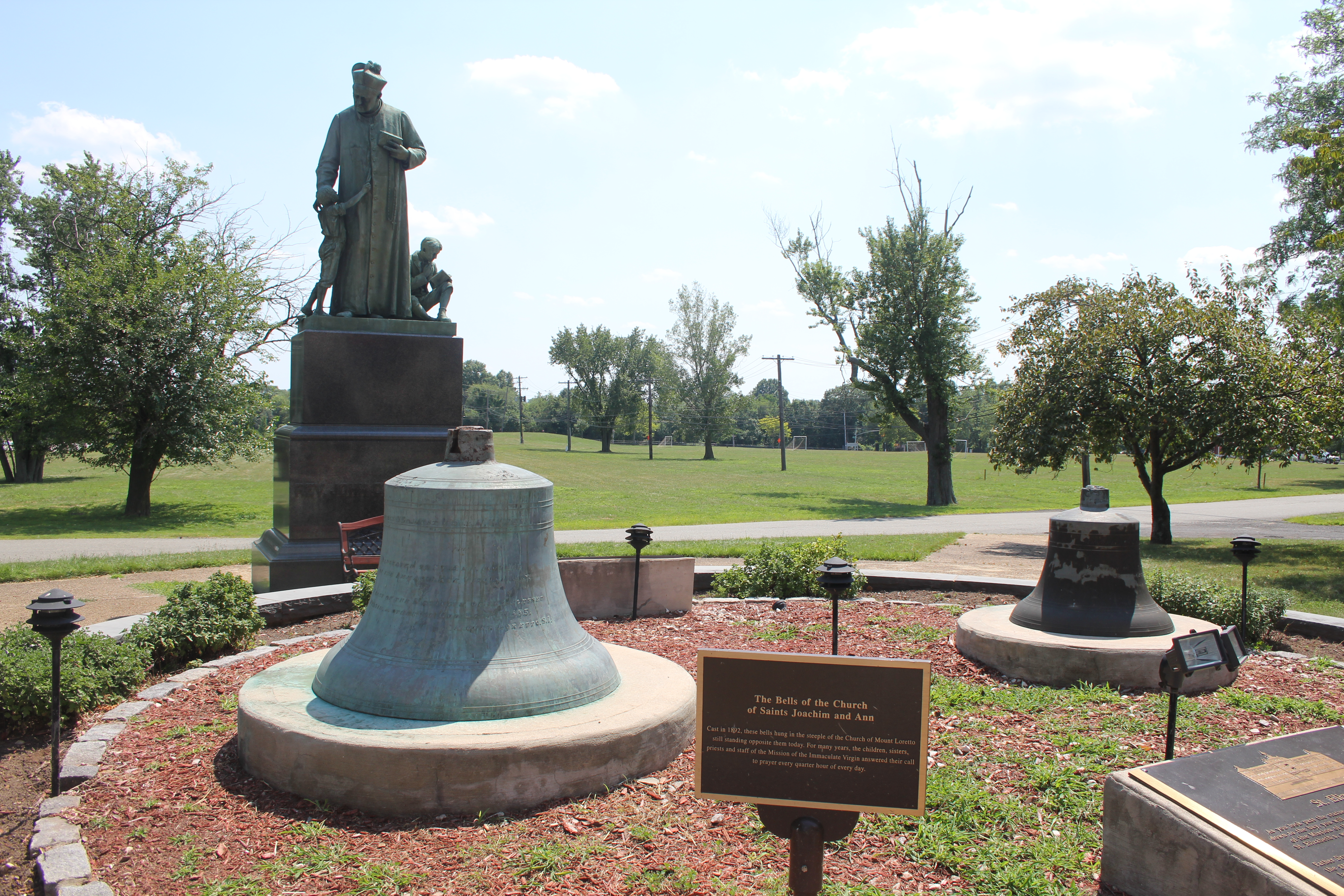
Father Drumgoole statue, and bells saved from the church after the 1973 fire, stand in front of the church.

It was constructed in 1891 on the grounds of Mount Loretto, an institution founded by Father John Drumgoole to house and educate destitute street children of the city. The church principally served the children and staff of that institution. Mount Loretto was conceived as a farm, and at the time of its construction, the church stood in a rural area.

In 1972, the church was one of the locations used in the movie The Godfather. In 1973, a serious fire largely destroyed the church, leaving only its facade. The owner of the church, the Archdiocese of New York, rebuilt it in 1976, incorporating the old facade into the new smaller structure.

The church is not considered a parish of the archdiocese. The church building does not operate full-time and is mainly used for occasional ceremonial Masses. Mount Loretto, officially known as the Mission of the Immaculate Virgin and now named Catholic Charities of Staten Island, continues to use the surrounding property for a variety of social services, including some residential programs. A small plaza in front of the church features bells saved from the steeples during the 1973 fire, and an 1891 statue of Father Drumgoole by sculptor Robert Cushing.
