= Discovery Museum (Acton, Massachusetts) =

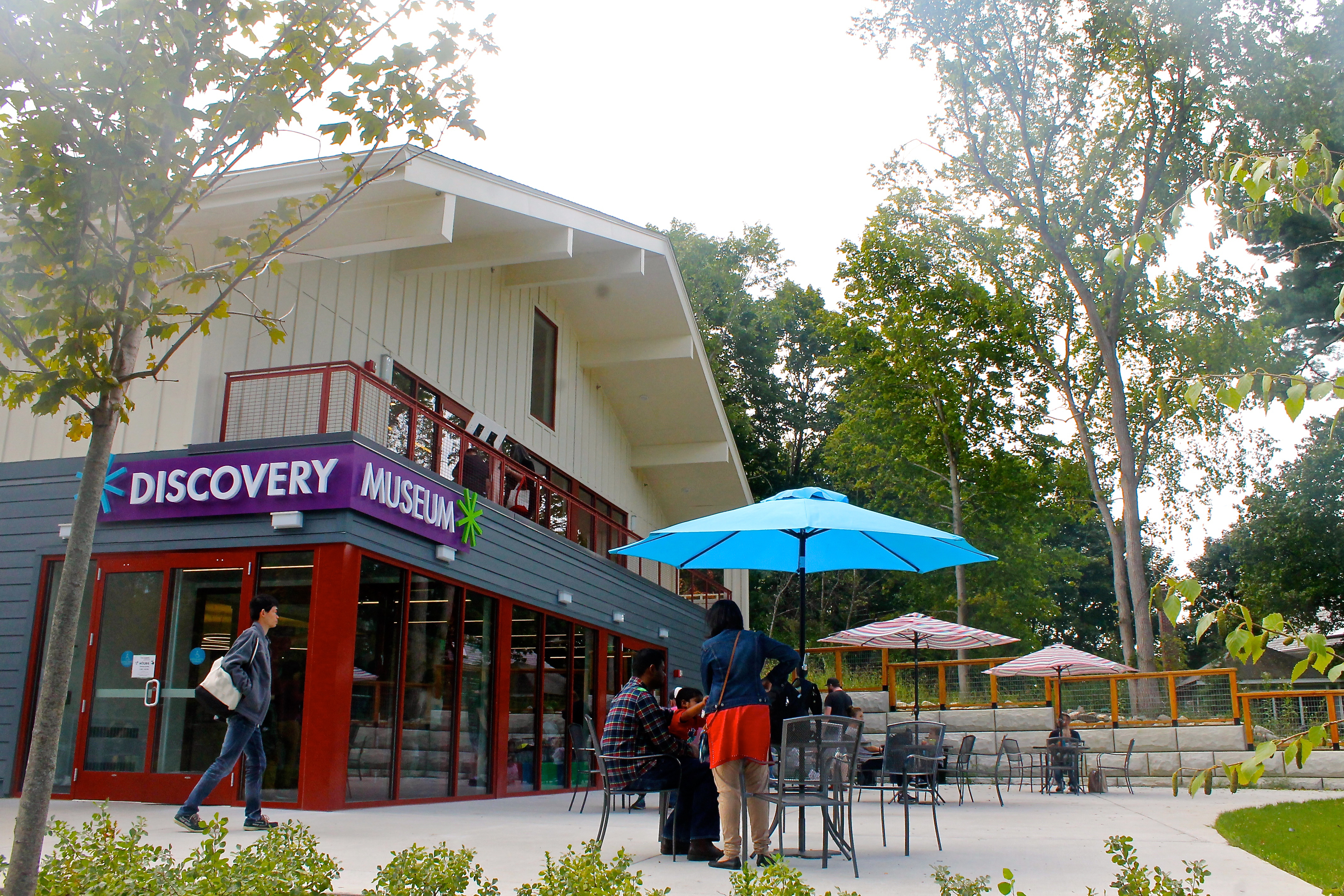
- Established: 1982
- Location: 177 Main Street (Route 27); Acton, Massachusetts 01720
- Coordinates: 42°27′53.26″N 71°27′22.18″W
- Type: Children's museum
- Director: Neil H. Gordon
- Public transit access: MBTA: South Acton
- Website: https://www.discoveryacton.org/

Discovery Museum is a hands-on museum for families that blends science, nature, and play, located in Acton, Massachusetts, United States. After an $8.8M expansion and renovation, the museum reopened in March 2018 as a 16,000 ft^{2} (1,500 m^{2}), accessible, single-building museum; a 550 ft^{2} (51 m^{2}) tree house and accessible nature playscape were added to the campus in July 2016. The museum was originally founded in 1982.

== Description ==
The museum and its Discovery Woods accessible outdoor nature playscape and 550 ft^{2} (51 m^{2}) tree house blend the best of STEAM (Science, Technology, Engineering, Art and Math) learning on a beautiful 4.5 acres (1.8 ha) campus abutting 180 acres (73 ha) of conservation land in Acton, about 20 mi (32 km) west of Boston. Originally founded in 1982 and expanded to two museums in 1987, the museum reopened in a single, accessible building after a complete renovation and expansion in early 2018. Discovery Woods, opened on the campus in July 2016, abuts 183 acres (74 ha) of conservation land on Great Hill used for visitor programs.

== History ==
The original Children's Discovery Museum was founded in 1982 by Donald B. Verger, a math teacher and naturalist. The Science Discovery Museum was added to the campus in 1988. An additional parcel that increased the campus size by half was purchased and a new master plan was commissioned in 2008.

In 2014, the museum initiated an $8.8 million renovation and expansion project. Construction began in 2016, and the facility reopened in March 2018 as a consolidated, 16,000-square-foot (1,500 m2) single-building structure. The renovation, designed by Cambridge Seven Associates, focused on merging the previously separate Children's Discovery Museum and Science Discovery Museum into a single, ADA-compliant facility with expanded exhibit space.

== Current exhibits ==
The museum has twice the exhibit space of the original museum and includes significant galleries for STEAM experiences including water; air; tinkering, design, and engineering; early brain development; math; light and color; and sound. It also includes re-imagined visitor favorites from the original buildings including a Diner, Train Room, and Ship Room, along with other beloved exhibit components such as a giant amethyst and radar magnet. All exhibits are hands-on, low-tech, open-ended, and interactive, to encourage play, exploration, and experimentation by all.

== Accessibility ==
The building is ADA-compliant and all exhibits are accessible, designed according to Universal Design principles to be both aesthetically pleasing and usable by the widest possible range of people, without regards to age or ability. In combination with the museum’s Discovery Woods outdoor nature playscape and treehouse, the entire campus is accessible.

The Museum's Open Door Connections program provides opportunities for those who face a variety of barriers—financial, developmental, or cultural—to experience the museum. In 2018, 22% of the total served visited for free or nearly free. The Museum provides dedicated free services for families with children on the autism spectrum and with vision or hearing loss; free admission to all on select Friday nights, and any time to military families; and $1 admission to EBT card holders and up to five guests.

== Awards and honors ==
- John F. Kennedy Center for the Performing Arts LEAD Community Asset Award, 2018
- Boston magazine’s Best of Boston 2018, Best Family-Friendly Museum, West
- New England Museum Association (NEMA) Excellence Award, 2015, 2018
- Massachusetts Commonwealth Award (Access Category), Massachusetts Cultural Council, 2017
- Best Museum, Gold or Silver, Wicked Local Reader’s Choice Awards, 2010-2018
- “Best of the Best” Family Favorites Award, Boston Parents Paper; 2010-2018
- Trip Advisor Certificate of Excellence, 2017
- Museums for America grant, Institute of Museum and Library Services, 2011, 2013–15, 2017

== Original buildings (now closed) ==
The original Children's Discovery Museum was housed in a 3-story Victorian house, built in 1880, that had 3,500 ft^{2} (330 m^{2}) of floor space in ten rooms. The former Science Discovery Museum was housed in a purpose-built postmodern building designed by E. Verner Johnson & Associates. It had 8,200 ft^{2} (760 m^{2}) of floor space. It is this structure that was completely renovated and expanded in 2018; the original Children's Discovery Museum building remains on campus but is used for office space and is closed to the public.

== Former exhibits ==
The former Children's Discovery Museum exhibits included the Assabet River Water Table, Bessie's Play Diner, Air Play, Backyard at Night, Sensations, S.S. Discover, the Chain Reaction Room, the Adventure fort, and the Train Room. Former exhibits include the Rainbow Room, Safari Room, Dinosaur Room, and Grandma's Attic.

The former Science Discovery Museum permanent exhibits included Earth Science, Inventor's Workshop, Rubber Ball Music Wall, and Sea of Clouds.

== CEO ==
Marie R. B. Beam (2024–present)

== Current and former directors ==
- Donald Verger
- Kathleen Compton
- Deborah Gilpin (1992-2003)
- Michael W. Judd
- Patricia J. Chisholm
- Wendy E. Baker
- Donald MacKenzie
- Russell Layton
- Katharine Denault
- Margaret (Meg) Ramsey
- Cheryl Beaudoin
- Justin Kliger
- Helen Crary
- Jeff Glidden
- Kerry Hawitt, Ph.D
- Andrew H. Howard
