= Prince's Bay Light =

Lighthouse in Staten Island, New York

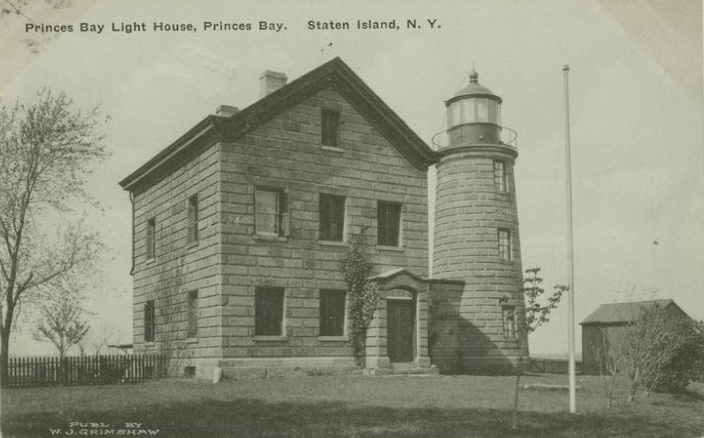
- Location: Staten Island, New York
- Coordinates: 40°30′27.7″N 74°12′48.3″W

Tower
- Constructed: 1828
- Foundation: Rubblestone
- Construction: Brownstone
- Automated: 2006
- Shape: Conical

Light
- First lit: 1864(Current tower)
- Deactivated: 1922-2006
- Focal height: 107 ft (33 m) (Original tower)
- Lens: Third-and-a-half-order Fresnel lens (original), VRB-25 (current)

The Prince's Bay Light (officially: John Cardinal O’Connor Light) is an active lighthouse on the highest point of the southern shoreline of Staten Island, New York, in the Pleasant Plains neighborhood. It is situated on an 85-foot (26 m) bluff overlooking Raritan Bay with an attached brownstone cottage which served as the lightkeeper's house. The bluffs are part of the southern terminal moraine formed by the Wisconsin Glacier which receded 10,000 years ago.

== History ==
The current lighthouse was constructed in 1864 for the sum of $30,000 which was approved by Congress. The attached lightkeeper's cottage was completed in 1868. Both buildings were designated as New York City Landmarks on June 28, 2016.

The Prince's Bay Lighthouse was deactivated in August 1922 after the installation of acetylene lights in Raritan Bay made the former lighthouse obsolete. The Mission of the Immaculate Virgin at Mt. Loretto, a Catholic orphanage founded by Father John Christopher Drumgoole, purchased the lighthouse, the cottage and an additional outbuilding in 1926.

In 1953, a rear range light was put up on Mt. Loretto, southeast of the lighthouse. The United States government paid $32 per year to lease the small parcel of land from the mission.

The lighthouse, the bluffs and 145 acres (59 ha) of surrounding upland and 49 underwater acres (20 ha) were purchased in 1999 from the Archdiocese of New York by New York State and the Trust for Public Land. The area, now known as the Mount Loretto Unique Area, is open to the public and maintained by the New York State Department of Environmental Conservation. The lighthouse cottage currently serves as the residence for the NYS Department of Environmental Conservation Forest Ranger Police Officer. The tower received a VRB-25 optical system which was placed on top of the lighthouse in 2006.
