= Great Hill Place =

- U.S. National Register of Historic Places
- A wedding in front of the house in 1909

- Location within Georgia
- Nearest city: Bolingbroke, Georgia
- Coordinates: 32.944186°N 83.818857°W
- Area: 350 acres (1.4 km^{2})
- Built: 1874-75
- Architectural style: Italianate, "plantation plain"
- NRHP reference No.: 73000633
- Added to NRHP: July 24, 1973

Great Hill Place, also known as Colaparchee and Cotton Place, near Bolingbroke, Georgia, was listed on the National Register of Historic Places in 1973. The listing included ten contributing buildings and two contributing structures on 350 acres (1.4 km^{2}).

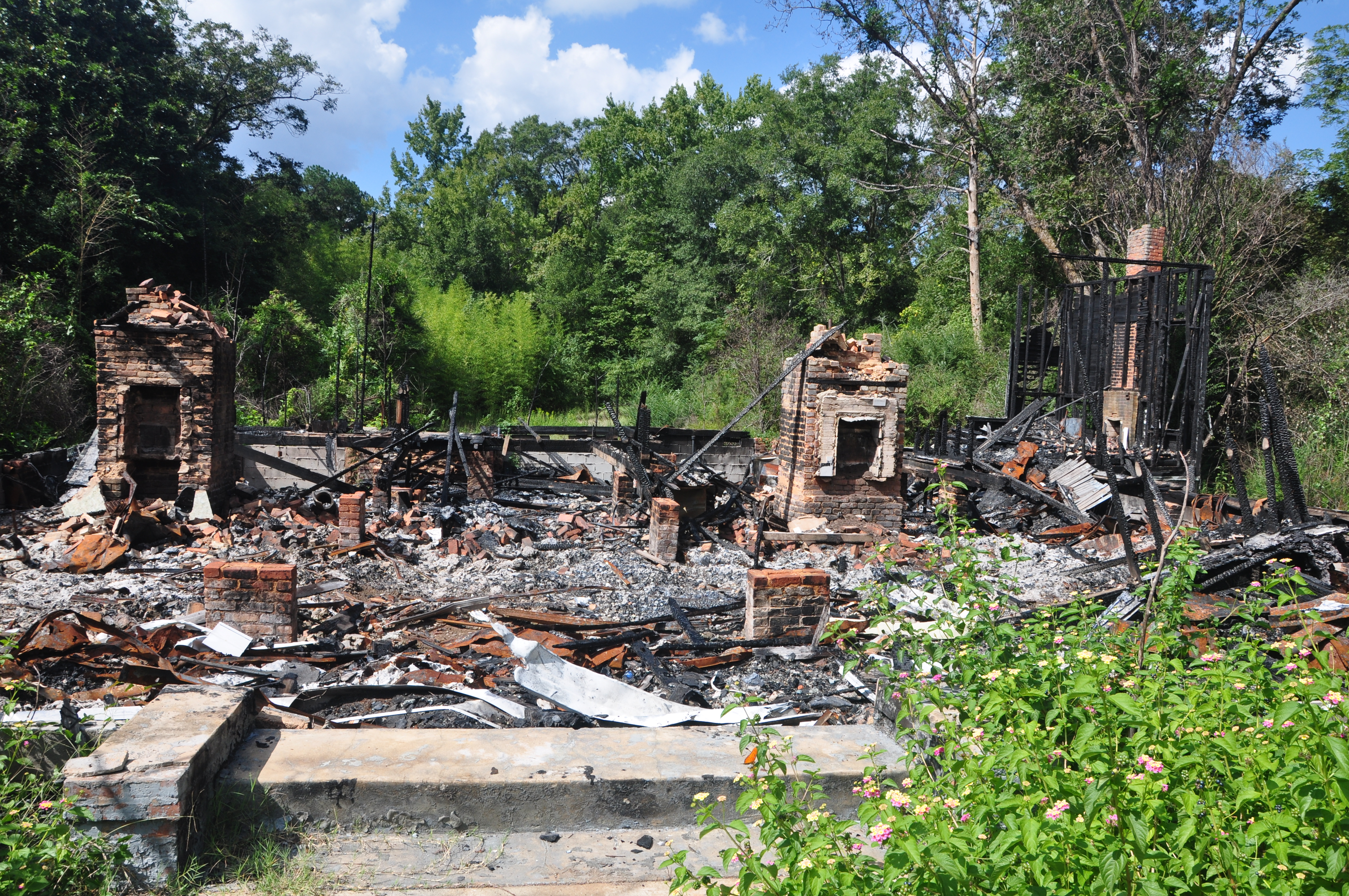
Ruins in 2014

The plantation complex, in 1973, included a two-story main house. The house, then known as Cotton Place, was enlarged and "Victorianized" in 1874–75 by railroad businessman William Morrill Wadley to retire there. The original house, built in the early 1800s, was plantation plain in style. Subsequent owners called it Colaparchee, before Wadley bought it in 1873. He named it "Great Hill" after his birthplace near Brentwood, New Hampshire. The plantation, then 1,360 acres (5.5 km^{2}), cost $6,410 (~$179,137 in 2024). Wadley was buried beside the house, in the Wadley family cemetery, after his death in 1882. His wife, Rebecca, joined him in 1905.

It was deemed significant as "one of few, almost perfectly intact plantation complexes" in the state of Georgia.

Some portion of the estate, perhaps the main house, has been lost (see photo from 2014). Satellite view of the property, in 2019, shows a large, presumably new mansion, covering where the main house was. A number of historic outbuildings survive.

It is located about 15 miles (24 km) northwest of Macon, Georgia, one or two miles west of the small town of Bolingbroke, off of Georgia State Route 41. It is about 1/2 mile (0.80 km) off Georgia State Route 41, a short way from the intersection of Route 41 and Interstate 475.

Coordinates 32.944186°N 83.818857°W point to what appears to have been the dairy of the plantation complex, based on comparison of sketch map to Google satellite view.
