= Statue of William Morrill Wadley =

Monument in Macon, Georgia

William M. Wadley
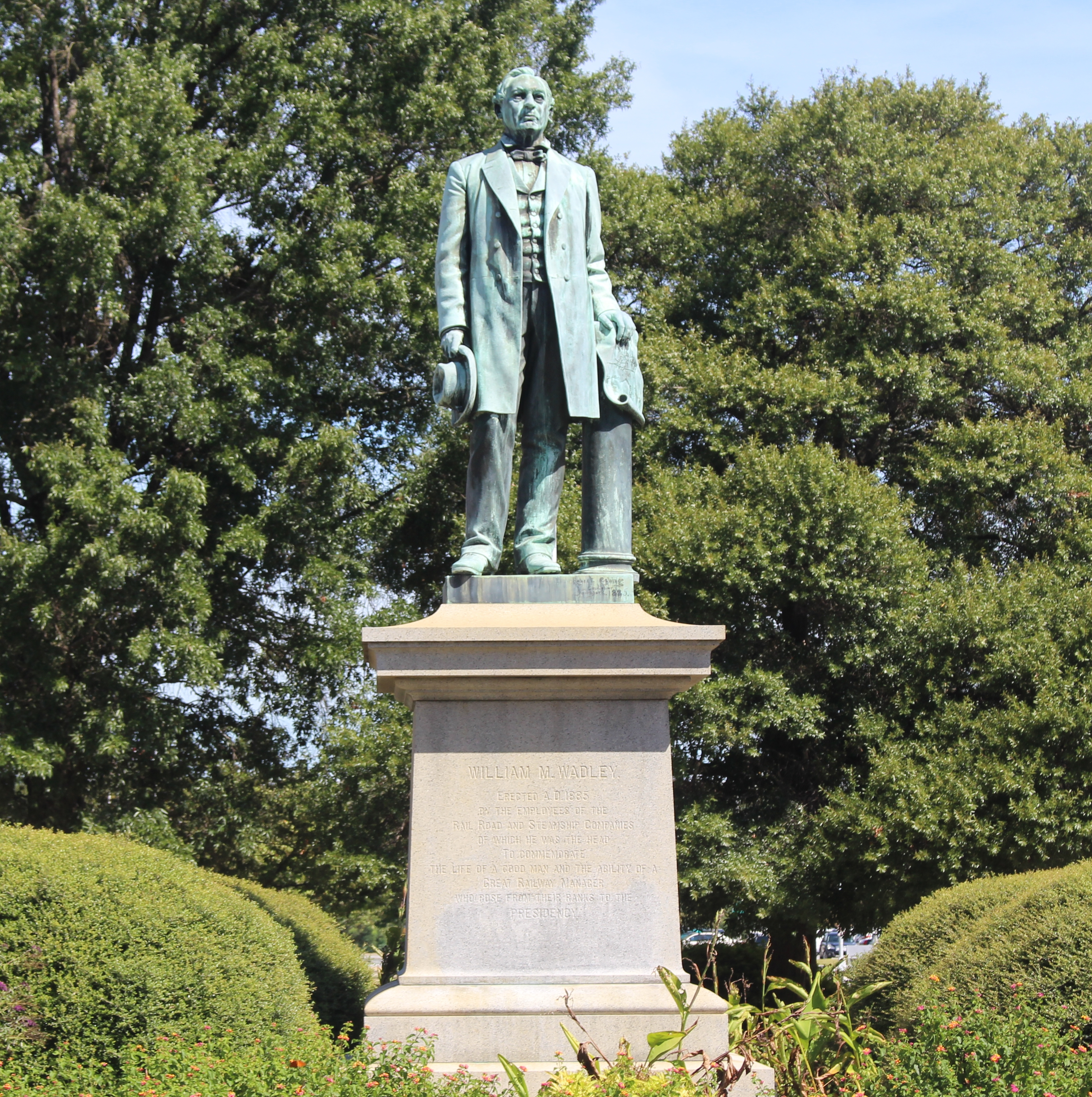
- The statue in 2018
- Location: Third Street Park, Macon, Georgia, United States
- Coordinates: 32°50′13″N 83°37′35″W
- Designer: Robert Cushing
- Fabricator: Henry-Bonnard Bronze Company
- Type: Statue
- Material: Bronze; Granite
- Length: 10 feet (3.0 m)
- Width: 10 feet (3.0 m)
- Height: 20 feet (6.1 m)
- Weight: 2,300 pounds (1,000 kg) (Pedestal only)
- Beginning date: April 1884
- Completion date: 1885
- Dedicated date: June 18, 1885
- Dedicated to: William Morrill Wadley

William M. Wadley is a public monument in Macon, Georgia, United States. The monument, which consists of a bronze statue atop a granite pedestal, was designed by Robert Cushing and dedicated in 1885 in honor of William Morrill Wadley, a railroad executive for the Central of Georgia Railroad who had died several years earlier. The monument was erected by a committee made up of his former employees and stands near the city's Terminal Station.

== History ==
=== Background and creation ===
William Morrill Wadley was born in New Hampshire in 1813. In 1833, he moved to Savannah, Georgia, and found employment with the Central of Georgia Railway. Wadley rose through the ranks of the company and by 1849 had been promoted to superintendent of the railroad. Over the next several decades, he worked in various executive positions for railroads throughout the southern United States, and during the American Civil War he was appointed by superintendent of transportation for the Confederate States of America by Confederate States President Jefferson Davis. After the war, he returned to work at the Central of Georgia Railroad, later becoming president of the company. He held this position until his death in 1882.

Following Wadley's death, some employees of the Central of Georgia established a memorial committee for the erection of a public monument in honor of Wadley. In April 1884, the committee commissioned New York City-based sculptor Robert Cushing to design a statue of Wadley. For the head of the statue, Cushing modeled it after a marble bust that he had previously completed of the subject using photographs and a face mask. The work was completed in 1885, with casting done by the Henry-Bonnard Bronze Company of New York City. In total, the cost of the monument was $20,000. The monument was dedicated on June 18, 1885.

=== Later history ===
In 1994, the statue was surveyed as part of te Save Outdoor Sculpture! initiative. At the time, the condition of the monument was considered in need of cleaning. In 2015, a family reunion of about 3 dozen descendants of Wadley's met at the statue and had a group photograph taken in front of it. The following year, the monument was vandalized with Satanic graffiti, including a pentagram and the phrase "Hail Satan".

== Design ==
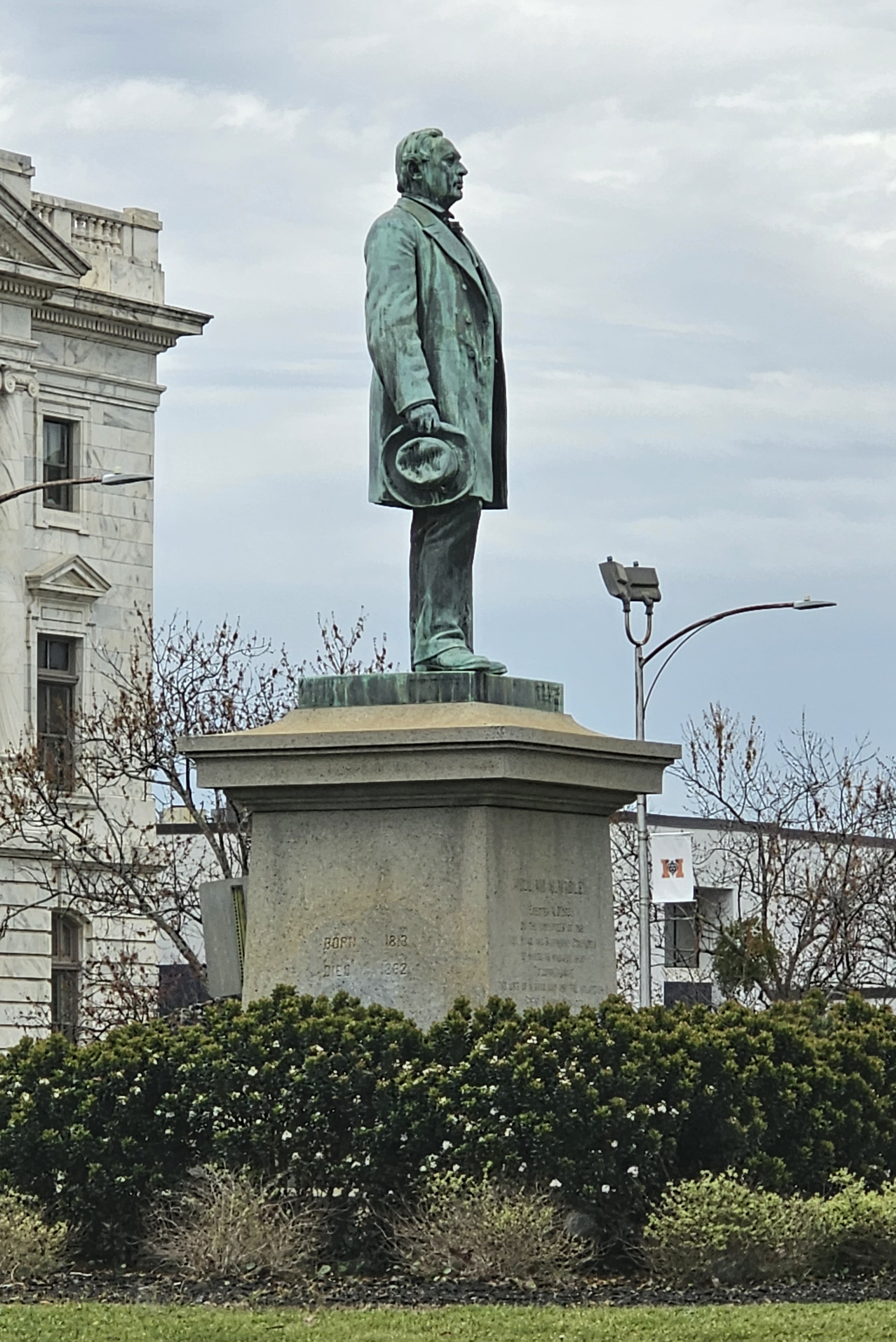
Partial sideview of the statue, 2023

The monument consists of a bronze statue of Wadley atop a pedestal made of granite from Quincy, Massachusetts. The sculpture stands approximately 9 feet 6 inches (2.90 m) tall and has a square base with side measurements of 38 inches (0.97 m) each, while the pedestal is approximately 10 feet 6 inches (3.20 m) tall and has a square base with side measurements of 10 feet (3.0 m) each. The pedestal weighs roughly 2,300 pounds (1,000 kg). Wadley is depicted as he appeared around the time of his death, wearing a double-breasted frock coat. To his left is a round column with a map that has lines representing various railroads. Wadley, who has his right leg forwards, has his left hand resting on the map while his right hand holds a wide-brimmed hat. An inscription on the left side of the front of the statue's bronze base bears the name of the sculptor ("Robert Cushing,/Sculptor,/New York, 1885."), while the foundry's marks appear on the right side ("Henry-Bonnard Bronze Co., New York 1885"). The pedestal bears the following inscriptions:

William M. Wadley/Erected A.D. 1885/By the Employees of the/Rail Road and Steamship Companies/of which he was The Head/To Commemorate/The Life of A Good Man and the Ability of A/Great Railway Manager/Who Rose From Their Ranks To The Presidency.

— Front

His Wisdom and Foresight/United Under The Control of the Central RR & BKG. Co./In One Great System/The South Western Ry. of Ala./The Mobile and Girard R.R./The Eufaula & Clayton R.R./The Montgomery & Eufaula Ry/The Georgia Railroad/The Port Royal & Augusta R./The Atlanta & West Point R.R./And Operated/The Ocean Steamship Co. of Savannah.

— Rear

Entered Service of G.R.R. 1841/Became President 1866

— Side

Born 1813/Died 1882

— Side

The monument is located at the intersection of Mulberry Street and Third Street in Macon, Georgia, near the city's Terminal Station, in an area called Third Street Park. It is located near the city's confederate monument, which is also on Mulberry Street.

== Sources ==
- Candler, Allen D.; Evans, Clement A., eds. (1906). Georgia: Comprising Sketches of Counties, Towns, Events, Institutions, and Persons Arranged in Cyclopedic Form. Vol. III. Atlanta: State Historical Association.
- Appletons' General Guide to the United States and Canada: Western and Southern states. Vol. II: Western and Southern States. New York City: D. Appleton & Company. 1898.
- Joyce, D. Hunter (November 8, 2015). "Family of Macon railroad builder reunite". WMAZ-TV.
- Knight, Lucian Lamar (1913). Georgia's Landmarks, Memorials and Legends. Vol. I. Atlanta: Byrd Printing Company.
- "William W. Wadley Statue". Macon365. Archived from the original on May 25, 2022.
- McGlamry, Maggie (August 9, 2016). "Historic Macon monument vandalized with Satanic references". WGXA. Archived from the original on March 1, 2024.
- Northen, William J., ed. (1911). Men of Mark in Georgia: A Complete and Elaborate History of the State from its settlement to the present time, chiefly told in biographies and autobiographies of the most eminent men of each period of Georgia's progress and development. Vol. Three. Atlanta: A. B. Caldwell.
- "William W. Wadley, (sculpture)". Smithsonian Institution Research Information System. Archived from the original on March 1, 2024.
- Stewart, Dorothy Houseal (Spring 1994). "Survival of the Fittest: William Morrill Wadley and the Central of Georgia Railroad's Coming of Age, 1866-1882". Georgia Historical Quarterly. 78 (1). Georgia Historical Society: 39–65. ISSN 0016-8297. JSTOR 40582984.
