= Robert Cushing (sculptor) =

Irish sculptor

- A New York Times sketch of Cushing in their obituary of the sculptor
- Born: 1841; County Tipperary, Ireland
- Died: 11 March 1896 (aged 55); Manhattan, New York City, U.S.
- Resting place: Calvary Cemetery, Queens, New York City
- Known for: Sculpture

Robert Cushing (1841 – 11 March 1896) was a prominent Irish sculptor, active in the United States in the second half of the 19th century. According to The New York Times, his most striking work was a statue of John Christopher Drumgoole in New York City.

== Life and career ==
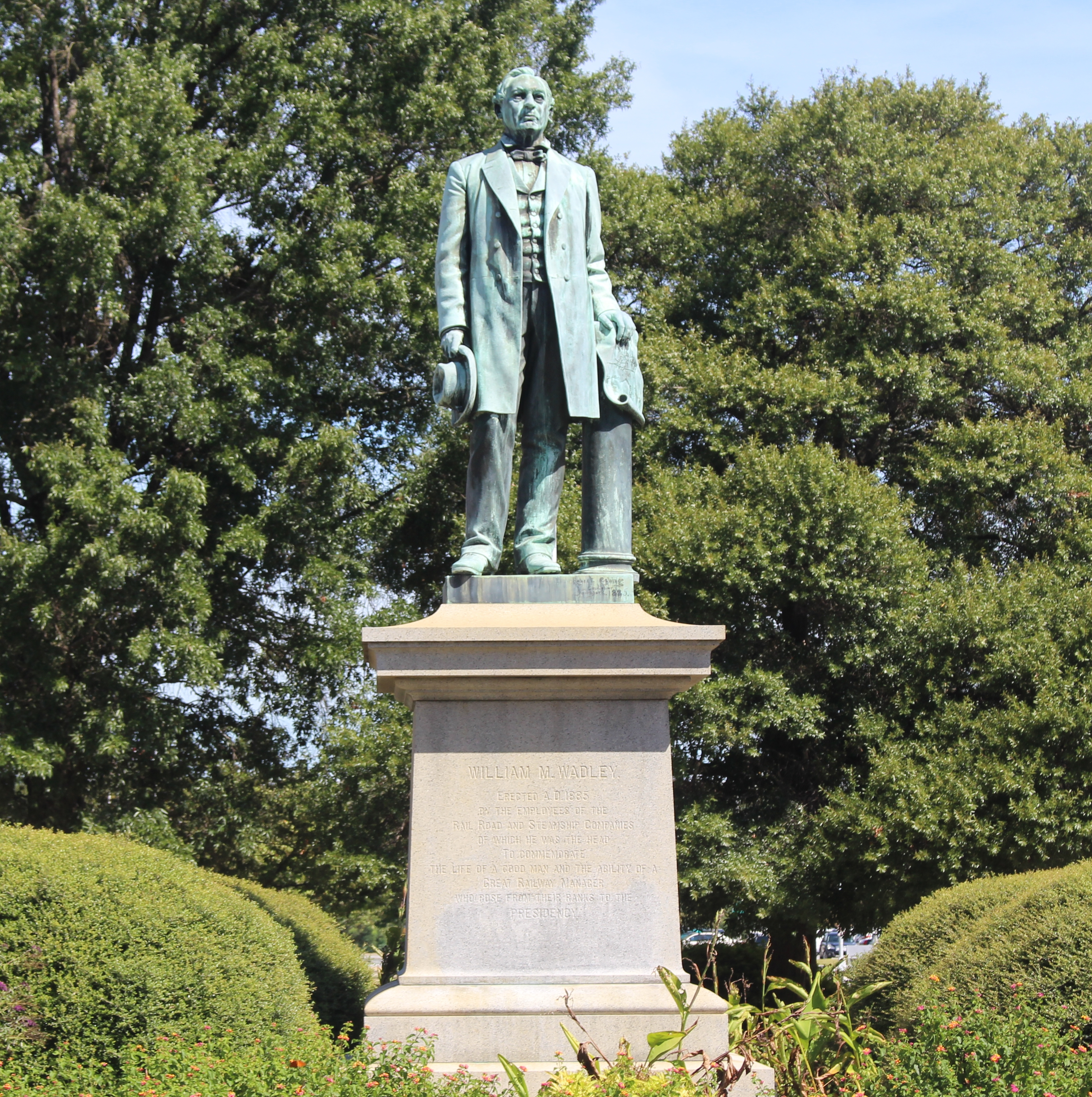
Cushing's statue of William Morrill Wadley at Terminal Station in Macon, Georgia. He is holding a railroad map in his left hand

Cushing was born in County Tipperary, Ireland, in 1841. He emigrated to the United States, arriving in New York City. He studied under Randolph Rogers in Rome, Italy, for a period.

He had an office at 44 West 30th Street in Manhattan's Tenderloin district.

Cushing had a daughter with his wife, who died several years before him.

In 1894, his most notable piece of work, a statue of compatriot Father John Christopher Drumgoole, was erected in Lafayette Place, New York City. It was moved to the Old Church of St. Joachim and St. Anne, Mount Loretto, in 1920.

== Death ==
Cushing died on 11 March 1896, aged 55. The sign he had left on his office door read: "Called away by an important engagement. Back at 3 P.M. tomorrow." He had left to go to St. Vincent's Hospital, and expected to be back at work the following day; however, he experienced "heart trouble", which, coupled with "other ailments", led to his death. He was buried in Calvary Cemetery, Queens. Only a couple of his most intimate acquaintances knew of his health problems.

== Selected works ==
Below is a selection of Cushing's works, which are believed to number around 500 in total.

- Equitable Building grouping, New York City
- William Morrill Wadley statue, Terminal Station, Macon, Georgia (1885)
- Bust of Cardinal McCloskey, St. Patrick's Cathedral, New York City
- Father Drumgoole statue, Mission of the Immaculate Virgin, Lafayette Place, New York City (1894) - moved to Mount Loretto in 1920
- John Kelly statue, Tammany Hall, New York City
- Millard Fillmore bust, Senate chamber, Washington, D.C. (1895)
