= Macon-Bibb County Transit Authority =

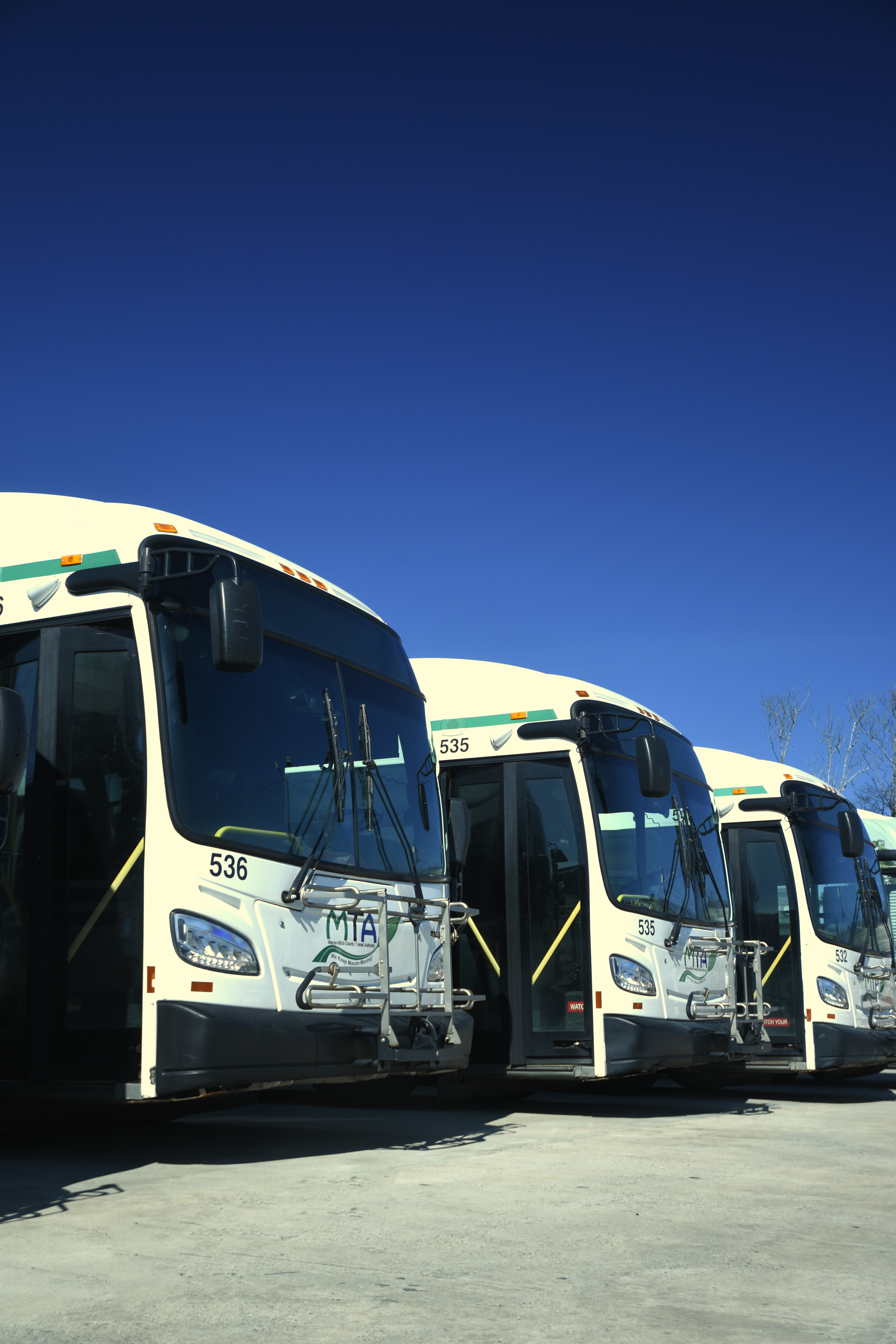
- Macon Bibb County Transit Authority's fixed route buses
- Founded: 1980
- Headquarters: 200 Cherry Street
- Locale: Macon, Georgia
- Service area: Macon-Bibb County, Georgia
- Service type: Bus service, paratransit, demand responsive transport
- Routes: 10
- Stations: Terminal Station
- Fleet: 40
- Website: www.mbcta.net

The Macon-Bibb County Transit Authority (MBCTA), commonly referred to as the Macon Transit Authority or MTA, is the public transit agency serving Macon, Georgia and Macon-Bibb County, Georgia. The agency operates fixed-route bus service, paratransit service, and Rapid Transit, an app-based on-demand transit service. Most fixed-route service operates from Terminal Station in downtown Macon.

Public transit in Macon continued after the city's streetcar lines were removed in 1938. The private Bibb Transit Company operated local transit service until its purchase by the county government in 1973. The current Macon-Bibb County Transit Authority was formed in 1980 by an act of the Georgia legislature.

== Services ==
=== Fixed-route bus service ===
MBCTA operates fixed-route bus service in Macon-Bibb County, with routes centered around Terminal Station in downtown Macon. Routes serve destinations including residential neighborhoods, commercial corridors, medical facilities, educational institutions, public offices, and shopping areas.

=== Paratransit ===
MBCTA provides paratransit service for eligible riders. Applications for paratransit certification may be completed online, downloaded, or submitted through the MBCTA paratransit office at Terminal Station.

As of 2026, paratransit fares include one-way, round-trip, 20-ride, and monthly pass options.

=== Rapid Transit ===
Rapid Transit is an app-based, on-demand transit service operated by MBCTA. The service uses a mobile booking system rather than fixed routes and allows riders to request shared trips within designated service zones.

Trips are booked through the Rides on Demand app. Riders receive pickup and drop-off information through the app, and fares are paid through the app-based system. Rapid Transit is cashless and app-based.

As of 2026, Rapid Transit operates Monday through Saturday. Fares are charged per person and vary by time of day, with lower daytime fares and higher evening fares. In March 2026, The Macon Newsroom reported that Rapid Transit had expanded into a second service zone serving south Bibb County, while MBCTA reduced some late-night fixed-route bus hours because of funding concerns.

== Routes ==
As of 2026, MBCTA operates 10 fixed routes in Bibb County.

- 1 Vineville | Zebulon
- 3 West Bibb | VA Clinic
- 4 Shurling | Walmart
- 5 Tom Hill | Riverside
- 6 Pio Nono | Rocky Creek
- 7 Eisenhower | Walmart
- 8 East Bibb | Jeffersonville Road
- 9 Houston Avenue
- 10 North Bibb | River Crossing
- 11 Log Cabin | North Napier

== Fares and payment ==
As of 2026, MBCTA fixed-route fares include regular, reduced/senior, and student fare options. The standard fixed-route fare is $1.25 for one ride and $1.75 for one ride with a transfer. Reduced fares are available for seniors age 62 and older, and student fares are available for K–12 students. Children age 12 and under ride free.

Paratransit fares include one-way, round-trip, 20-ride, and monthly pass options. MBCTA also supports mobile fare payment through Token Transit for approved paratransit riders.

Rapid Transit fares are paid through the Rides on Demand app. The service does not accept cash, and fares are charged per person.

== Terminal Station ==
MBCTA's central transfer hub is located at Terminal Station at 200 Cherry Street in downtown Macon. The facility serves as the main transfer point for fixed-route bus service and houses MBCTA's paratransit office.

The FY 2023–2024 annual financial report described several Terminal Station projects, including elevator modernization, interior repairs related to roof leaks, flooring and painting work, and expansion of the Transfer Center dispatch area.

== Fleet ==
MBCTA operates fixed-route buses, paratransit vehicles, and vehicles used for Rapid Transit. In 2020, the agency unveiled two electric BYD K9S buses purchased with support from a $1.75 million Federal Transit Administration grant awarded to Macon-Bibb County in 2017.

The authority has continued to expand its electric fleet. Its FY 2023–2024 annual financial report stated that MBCTA operated four electric transit vehicles, had six additional electric transit vehicles being assembled, and had five more ordered. The report also stated that the authority operated 10 electric paratransit/Rapid Transit vehicles, with two more ordered, and projected 27 electric vehicles operating by fall or winter 2026.

== Governance and funding ==
MBCTA is a component unit of Macon-Bibb County. According to the authority's FY 2023–2024 annual financial report, its governing board consists of seven members. The Mayor of Macon-Bibb County nominates board members, and confirmation and final approval are made by the Macon-Bibb County Commission. Two board members must be consumers of transit services.

The authority operates as an enterprise fund and receives support through fare revenue, rental revenue, intergovernmental revenues, grants, and other sources. The FY 2023–2024 annual financial report stated that Macon-Bibb County provides monthly support equal to one-twelfth of the authority's estimated operating deficit and that the authority must submit a proposed operating budget and monthly revenue and expense statements to the county.
