= Drumgoole Plaza =

Public park in Manhattan, New York

Coordinates: 40°42′40″N 74°00′15″W

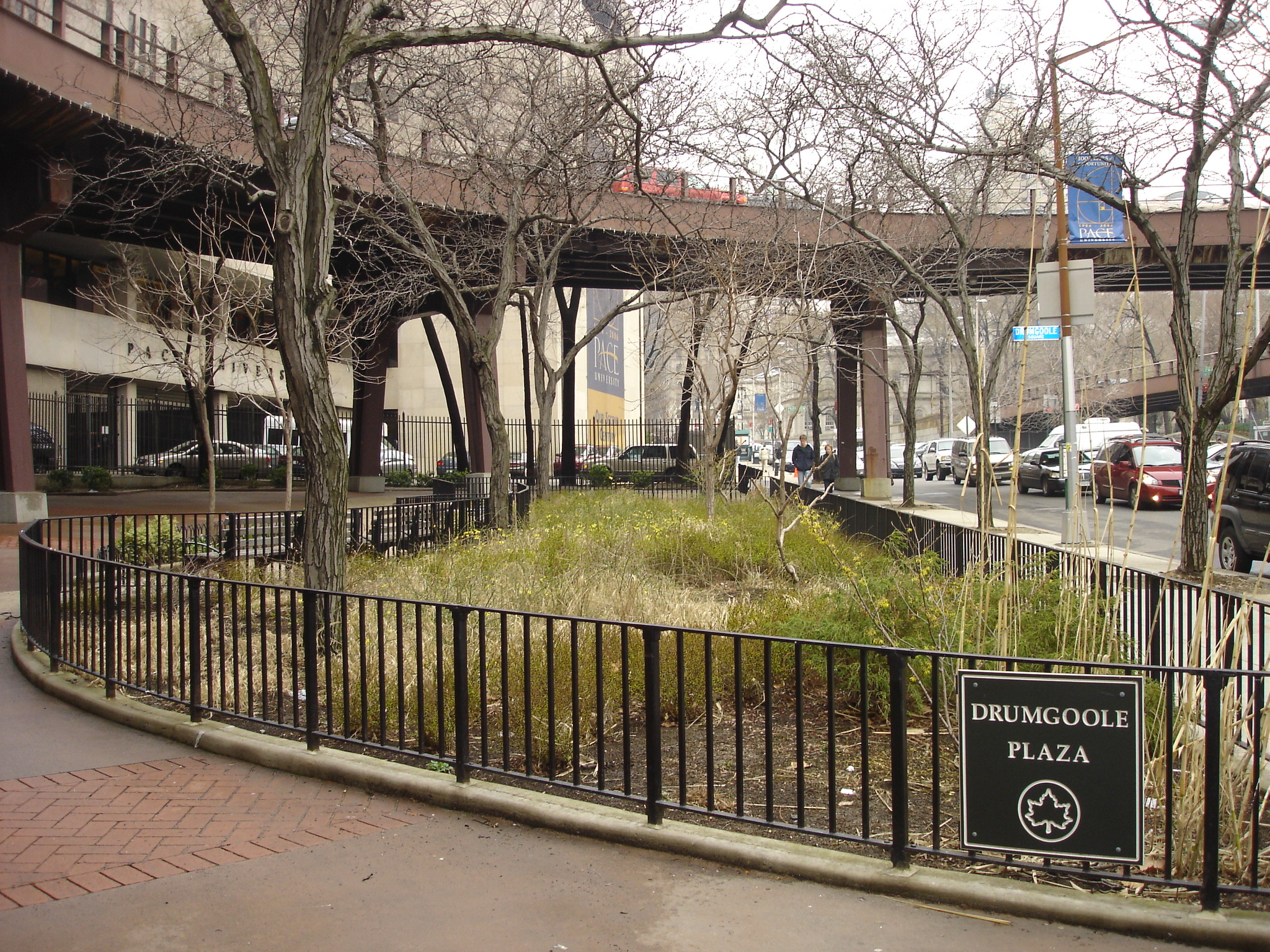
- Interactive map of Drumgoole Plaza
- Location: Manhattan, New York City
- Created: November 5, 2003
- Operator: New York City Department of Parks and Recreation

Drumgoole Plaza is a public park that sits below the ramps to the Brooklyn Bridge in Manhattan, New York City, on Frankfort Street between Park Row and Gold Street, and next to the main building of Pace University at One Pace Plaza. Opened on November 5, 2003, the park is maintained by Pace under the management of the New York City Department of Parks and Recreation.

== History ==
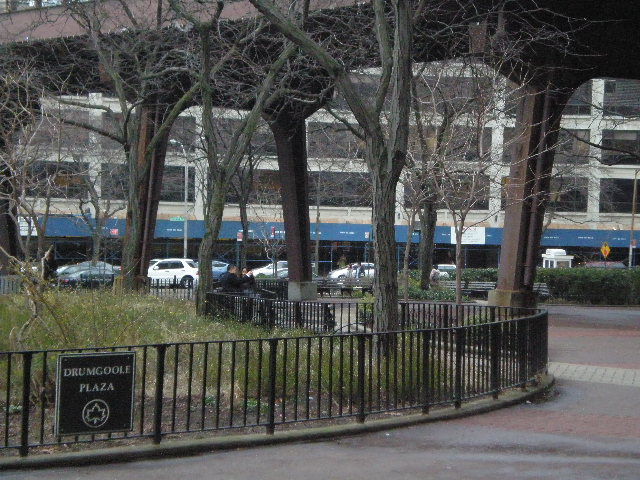
Drumgoole Plaza

Drumgoole Plaza was rededicated in 2003. It was the first park to be renovated with a grant from the Lower Manhattan Development Corporation, which had given $25 million to revitalize 13 open spaces in Lower Manhattan after the September 11 attacks.

The Department of Parks & Recreation and Pace University reconstructed an empty lot into a sitting area with 1964 New York World's Fair benches. Other features include decorative paving, granite and concrete curbs, and streetlights for public safety and to illuminate the bridge structure. The landscaping added around 20 new trees, with species including goldenrains, honey locusts and hollies. 1,100 shrubs were added, including perennials, ornamental grasses such as winter hazel, hydrangea, blue star, and striped ribbon grass. Nets keep birds away.

The plaza had been named in 1989 in honor of John Christopher Drumgoole (1816–1888), a priest who helped thousands of homeless newsboys who thronged the area when Park Row was the headquarters of New York City's major newspapers, including The New York Times in the building Pace now occupies at 41 Park Row.

== See also ==
- List of parks in New York City
