= Great Hill (Acton, Massachusetts) =

Hill in Acton, Massachusetts, US

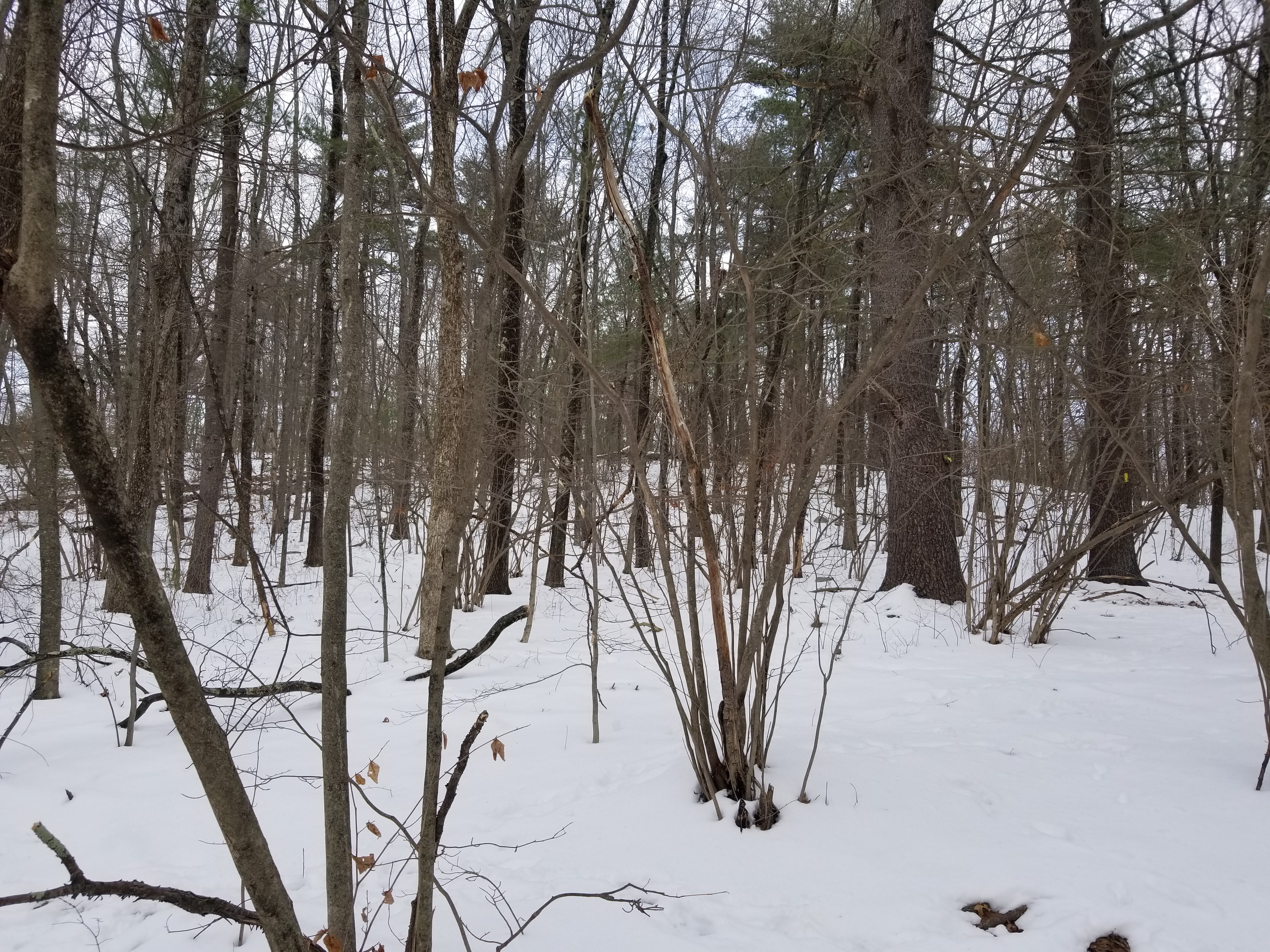
- Slope of Great Hill

Highest point
- Elevation: 358 ft (109 m)
- Coordinates: 42°28′07″N 71°27′15″W

Geography
- Location: Middlesex County, Massachusetts
- Topo map: USGS Framingham

Great Hill is a 358-foot (109 m) hill in Acton, Massachusetts, the site of a 192-acre (78 ha) wooded conservation area containing hiking trails, wetlands, and recreational facilities. It is the largest single parcel of conservation land in the town.

The hill has evidence of Native American use, including a stone mortar. There are also 18th-century farmers' stone walls criss-crossing the property, as well as picnic facilities near a small skating pond and athletic fields adjacent to the South Acton Fire Station. The hill abuts the Discovery Museum, which often uses Great Hill for educational programs.

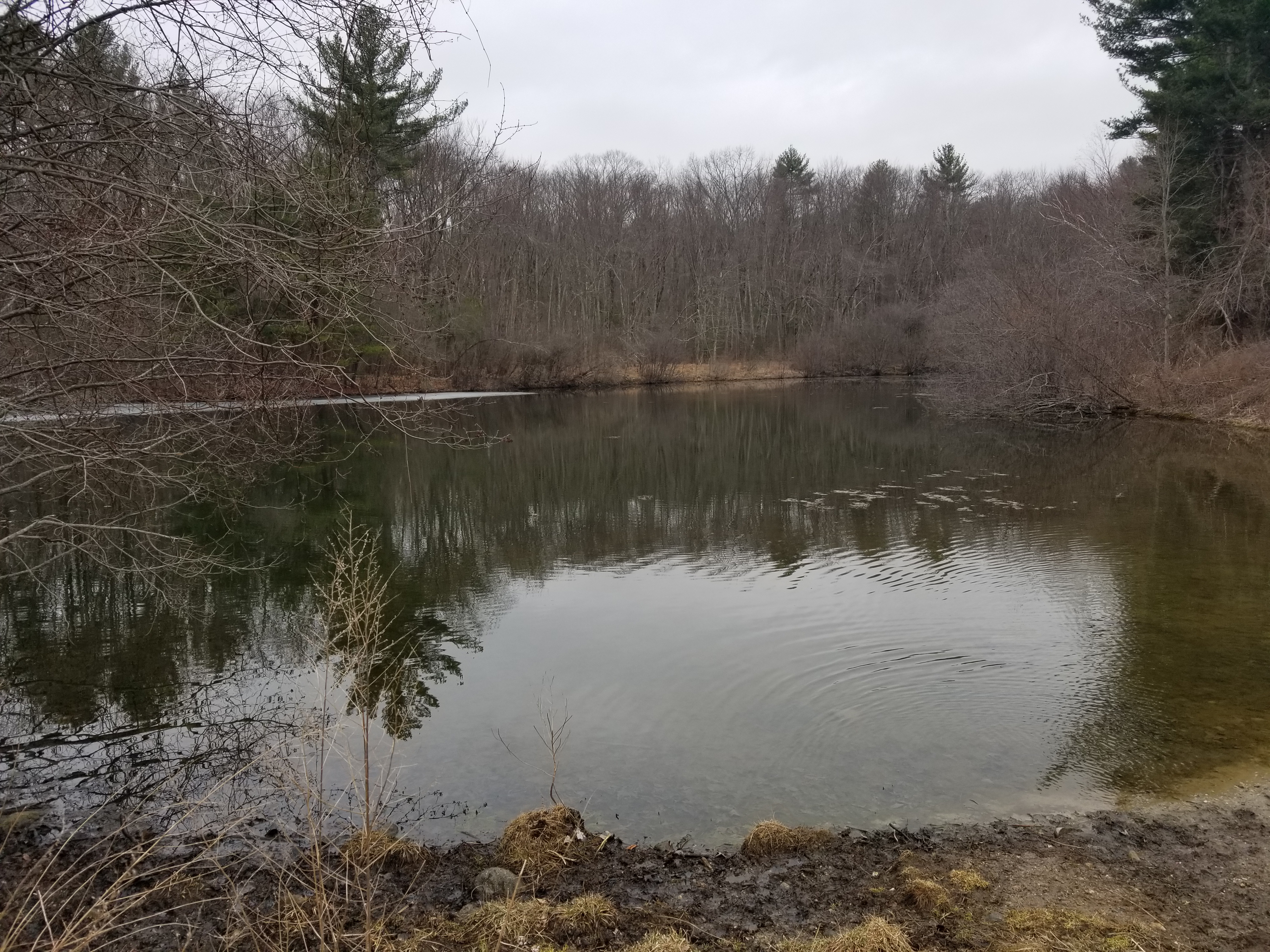
Skating pond

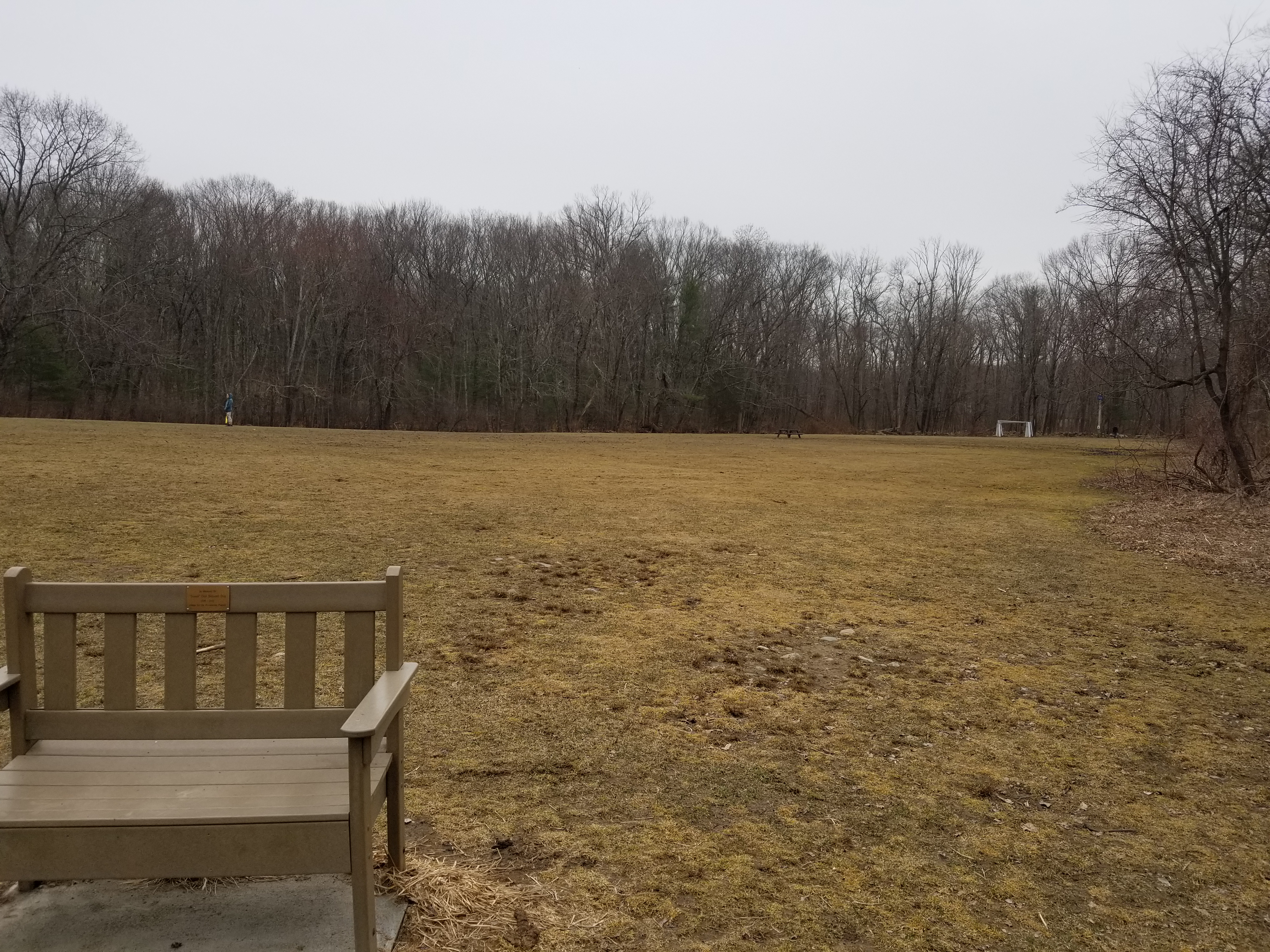
Soccer field

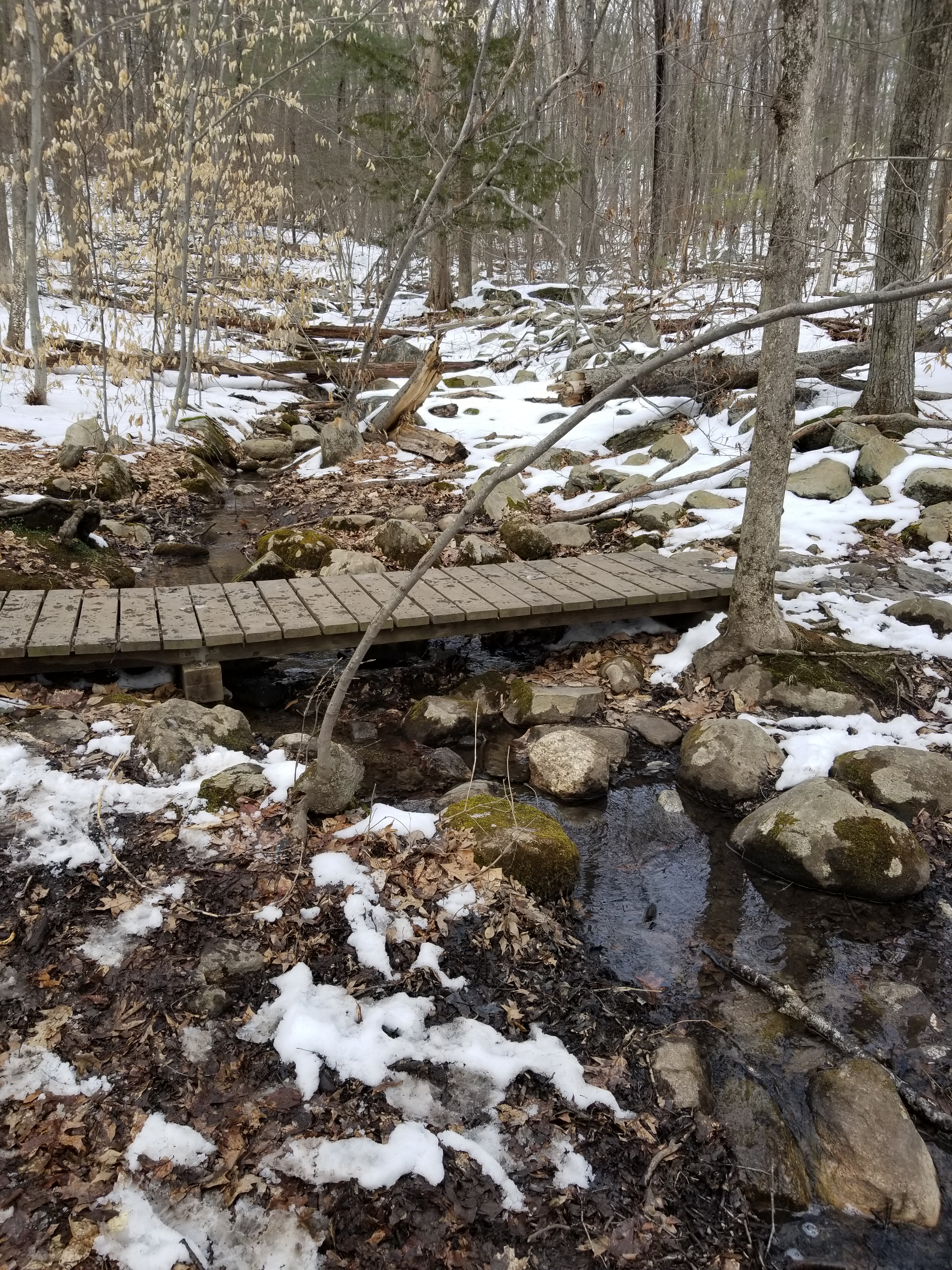
Bridge over a springtime brook on the side of Great Hill
