= Playscape =

Area of land designed for children to play on

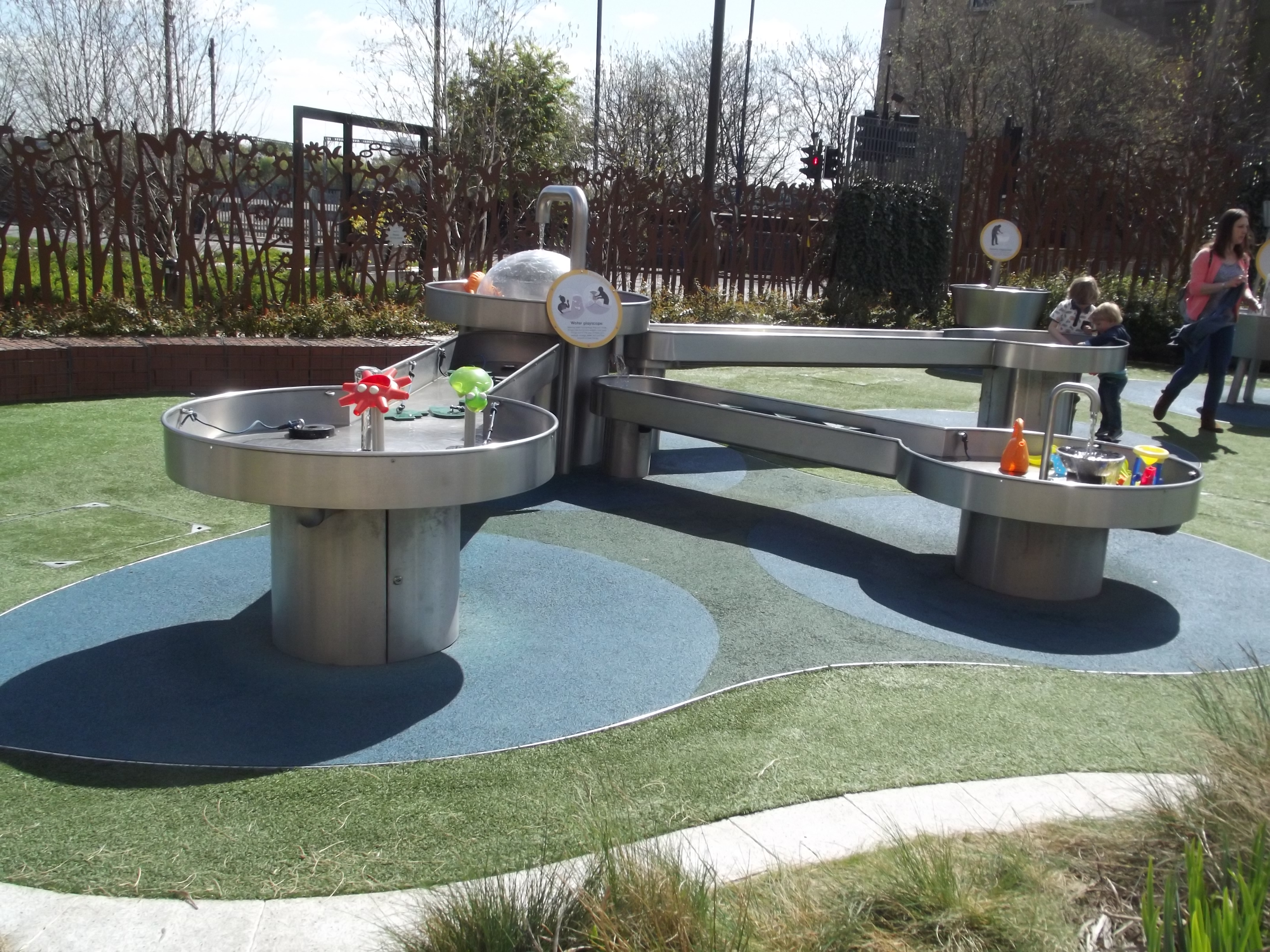
A water-based playscape in the Thinktank Science Garden in Birmingham, England

A playscape is either a piece of land modified for children's play (a natural playscape), a particular structure on a playground, or a nontraditional type of play environment. Landscape architects and designers are increasingly using the term to express areas of cities that encourage interaction and enjoyment for all ages. The term was probably first used in the mid-twentieth century, possibly first attributable to the National Institute for Architectural Education in 1957, and associated in the 1960s with the New York-based Playground Corporation of America. It is mentioned by Joe Frost in his 1992 book, Play and Playscapes, referring to attempts to replace or add on to the rubberized surface, metal and plastic of traditional playgrounds.

Playscapes may or may not incorporate traditional playground equipment like swings, slides, and climbers. When they do so, they may incorporate slides or climbers in a more cohesive way than typical playgrounds do—often into embankments. Playscapes may also offer a wide range of open-ended play options that allow people to be creative and use their imagination including sand or earth to sculpt and blocks or other materials to build with.

The term playscape can function at similar scales as the term playground—describing an entire play area or a large part of the play area designated for a certain age group. It may also be applied at a larger scale to describe play landscapes that are organised in non-traditional ways (e.g. along greenways). Playscapes may be defined by clear boundaries or through their shaping of the landscape to encourage play and interaction. Landscape architects and designers are increasingly using the term to refer to areas of cities that encourage interaction and enjoyment for all ages.

== History ==
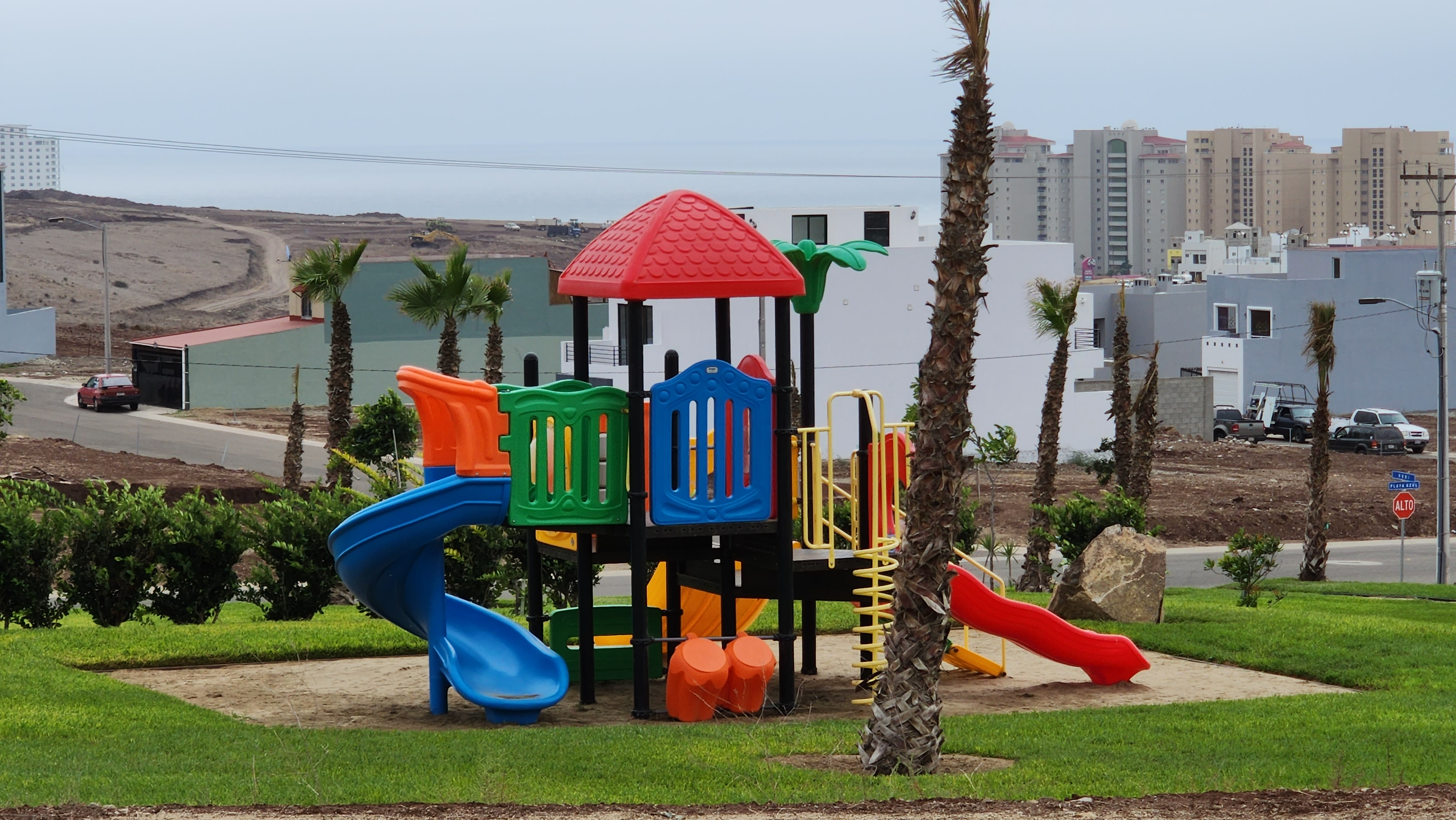
playground in Punta Azul

The term was probably first used in the mid-twentieth century. It is possibly first attributable to the National Institute for Architectural Education in 1957.

The landscape architect Garrett Eckbo was among those who used the term playscape to describe his work. In a Spring 1960 article in Landscape Architecture (now Landscape Architecture Magazine), Eckbo used the term playscape to refer to a play landscape his firm Eckbo, Dean Austin Landscape Architects designed for the Longwood urban renewal project in Cleveland, Ohio:

“The central play park became a playscape: a bowl of contoured grassy mounds and hollows, bordered with sheltering specimen trees, and incorporating a little grove of steel poplars, a family of concrete turtles, a fantastic village, contoured sand pit, saddle slide, jumping platform, and the terraced tile wading pool developed around William McVey’s abstract sculpture…”

The term was associated in the 1960s with the New York-based Playground Corporation of America.

It is mentioned by Joe Frost in his 1992 book, Play and Playscapes, referring to attempts to replace or add on to the rubberized surface, metal and plastic of traditional playgrounds.

== Safety ==
Playscapes are designed to eliminate fall heights. Playscapes have rolling hills and fallen logs rather than a central play structure with monkey bars. Playscapes have much lower injury rates than standard playgrounds.

Playscapes have a fraction of the number of child injuries compared to standard playgrounds with play structures. The most frequent injury to children on playgrounds is a fracture of the upper limb resulting from falls from climbing apparatuses. The second most common cause of injury to children on playgrounds is falls from slides. Fall heights are the largest safety issue for most safety inspectors.

== Developmental benefits ==
Playscapes offer a wide range of benefits such as increasing physical activity, fine and gross motor skills & cognitive development. They are also used in horticultural therapy for rehabilitation of mental and/or physical ailment. They increase participation rates and decrease absenteeism, decrease bullying, decrease injury rates, increase focus and attention span and help with social skills in schools. Playscapes have shown to increase children's level of physical activity, and motor ability. Playscapes are found to be very beneficial in the growth and development of children both mentally and physically. Cognitive development, focus, attention span and social skills are all improved.

== Natural playground ==
Nature playgrounds use natural landscapes, natural vegetation, and materials in a creative and interactive way for child play and exploration. Nature playscapes are created for the enhancement of a child's curiosity, imagination, wonder, discovery, to nurture a child's connectedness and affinity for the world around them. Using native plants, rolling hills, and many trees, these playscapes may represent a natural place such as a forest. Playscapes are designed with the intent of bringing people back to nature. (See Richard Louv's Last Child in the Woods: Saving Our Children from Nature Deficit Disorder, 2005).

Play components may include earth shapes (sculptures), environmental art, indigenous vegetation (trees, shrubs, grasses, flowers, lichens, mosses), boulders or other rock structures, dirt and sand, natural fences (stone, willow, wooden), textured pathways, and natural water features.

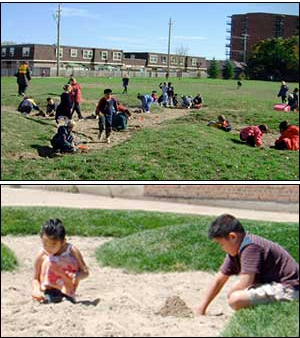
A natural playground sandbox using creative landforms.

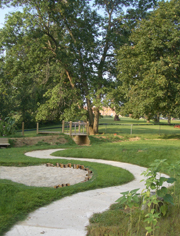
A totally accessible natural playground.

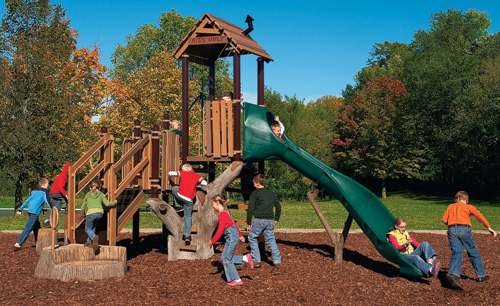
Natural play tree house.

== See also ==
- Children Youth and Environments Journal
- Buddy bench
