= Mount Loretto Unique Area =

Nature preserve in Staten Island, New York

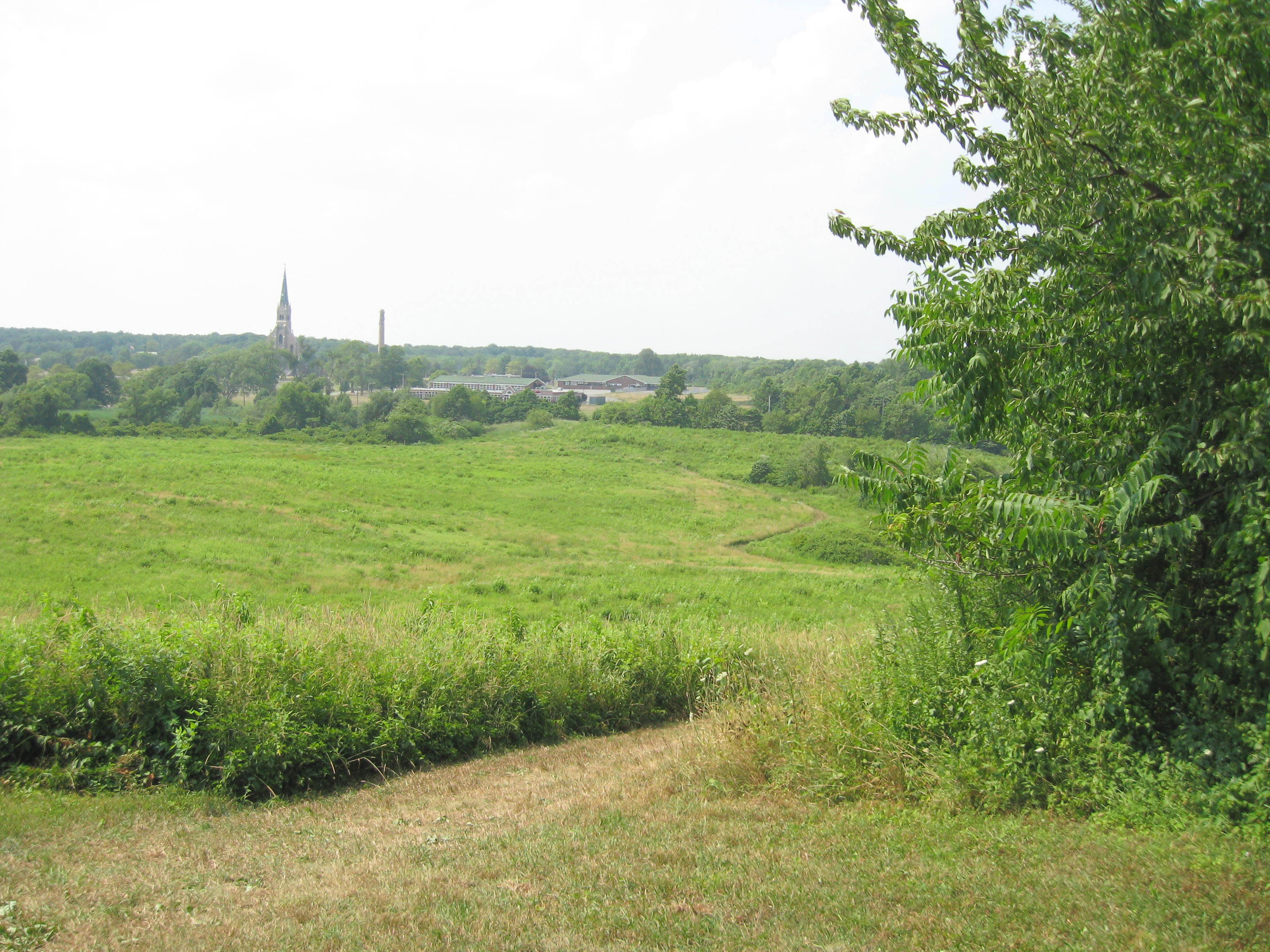
- View looking across Mount Loretto Unique Area; Church of St. Joachim and St. Anne in the distance

- Location within New York City Location within New York Location within the United States
- Location: Staten Island, New York
- Nearest city: New York City
- Coordinates: 40°30′28″N 74°13′03″W
- Area: 241 acres (98 ha)
- Established: 1999
- Governing body: New York State Department of Environmental Conservation

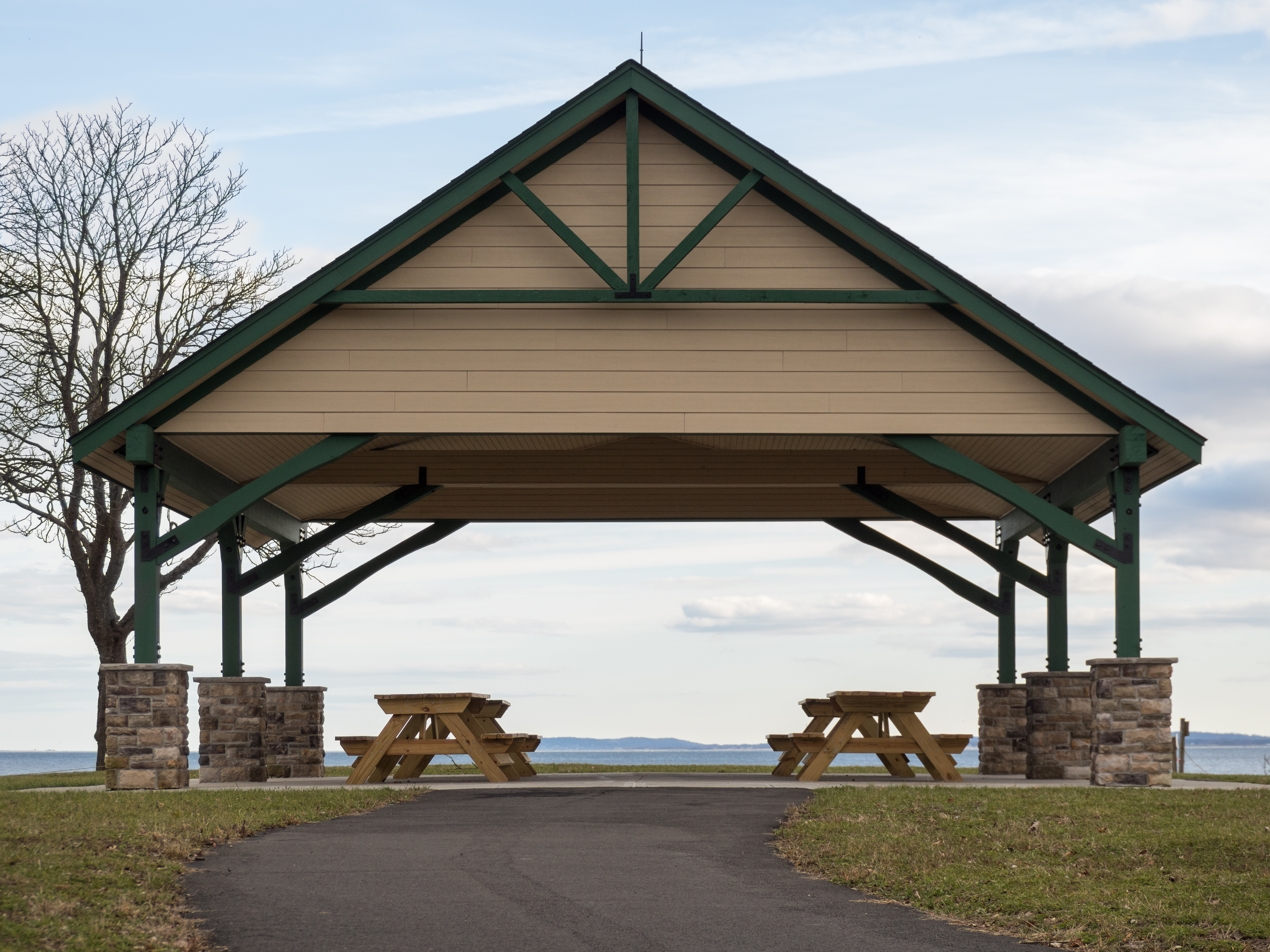
Mount Loretto's Pavilion

Mount Loretto Unique Area is an open space reserve and nature preserve administered by the New York State Department of Environmental Conservation on the South Shore of Staten Island, New York City. The area's total size is 241 acres (98 ha), of which 49 acres (20 ha) is underwater.

== History ==
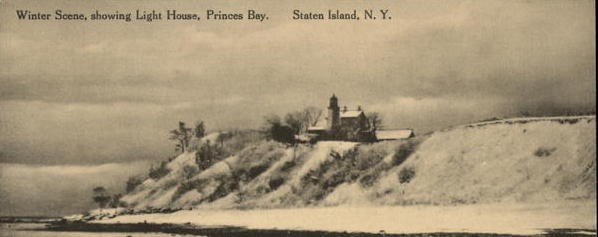
Prince's Bay Light on a bluff at Mount Loretto Unique Area

Mount Loretto was once the largest orphanage in New York State. It was started by Father John Christopher Drumgoole, an Irish Catholic priest and founder of the Mission of the Immaculate Virgin in Manhattan, an organization to help poor and disposed children. He purchased the Staten Island land for the orphanage in the 1880s and named it "Mount Loretto" in honor of one of the nuns who worked with him at the mission. It was served by the Mount Loretto Spur of the Staten Island Railway.

The area is also referred to as "Mount Loretta" [sic] in the official New York State Gazetteer, maintained and published by the New York State Department of Health, which includes numerous defunct hamlets and towns, some with alternate or archaic spellings.

The area that encompasses the Mount Loretto Unique Area was purchased from the Archdiocese of New York by the New York State Department of Environmental Conservation in 1999. The property formerly contained various buildings including the St. Elisabeth's girls' dormitory, a large Victorian Era building that was destroyed by arson during the time that title to the land was being transferred to the state.

== Geography and natural history ==
Today, Mount Loretto has approximately one mile (1.6 km) of shoreline fronting Prince's Bay and Raritan Bay. Along the shoreline are the highest ocean-facing bluffs in New York State, which reach a height of 75 feet (23 m). The bluffs are part of a terminal moraine of clay and gravel left by the Wisconsin Glacier, which reached its southernmost terminus in Staten Island. The highest bluff is the location of an historic lighthouse, the Prince's Bay Light. The stone lighthouse, which was built in 1864 with an attached lighthouse keeper's cottage built in 1868, is a New York State Landmark.

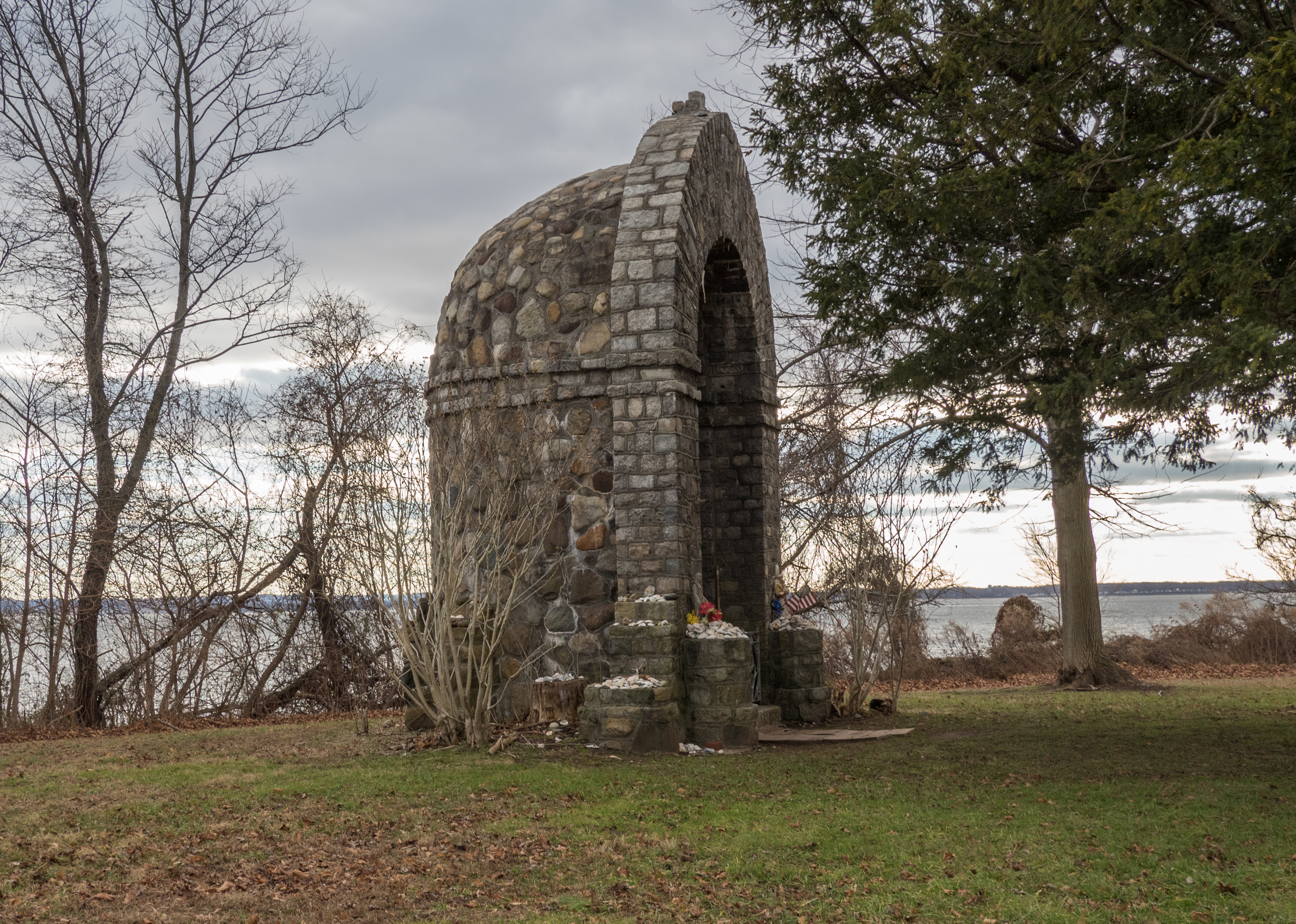
Shrine of the Immaculate Virgin

Within the preserve, in addition to the bluffs, there are extensive brackish and freshwater wetlands including a large vernal pond. The preserve contains a wide variety of native plants, shrubs, and trees, owing to the diverse habitats represented within the park.

Various species of birds frequent the park during various parts of the year. Its large mowed fields make it attractive to many species of upland shorebirds such as buff-breasted sandpiper and upland sandpiper. Other field birds, such as eastern meadowlark and bobolink, can also be found here during migration. The wetlands areas support habitat utilized by various species of waterfowl such as the wood duck (Aix sponsa), blue and green-winged teal, as well as many species of ducks, waders and marsh birds. Many rare birds have visited the preserve including white ibis, scissor-tailed flycatcher and western kingbird. The preserve is also home to snakes, turtles, frogs and toads, as well as raccoons, chipmunks, moles and field mice.
