= John Christopher Drumgoole =

Irish-American Roman Catholic priest

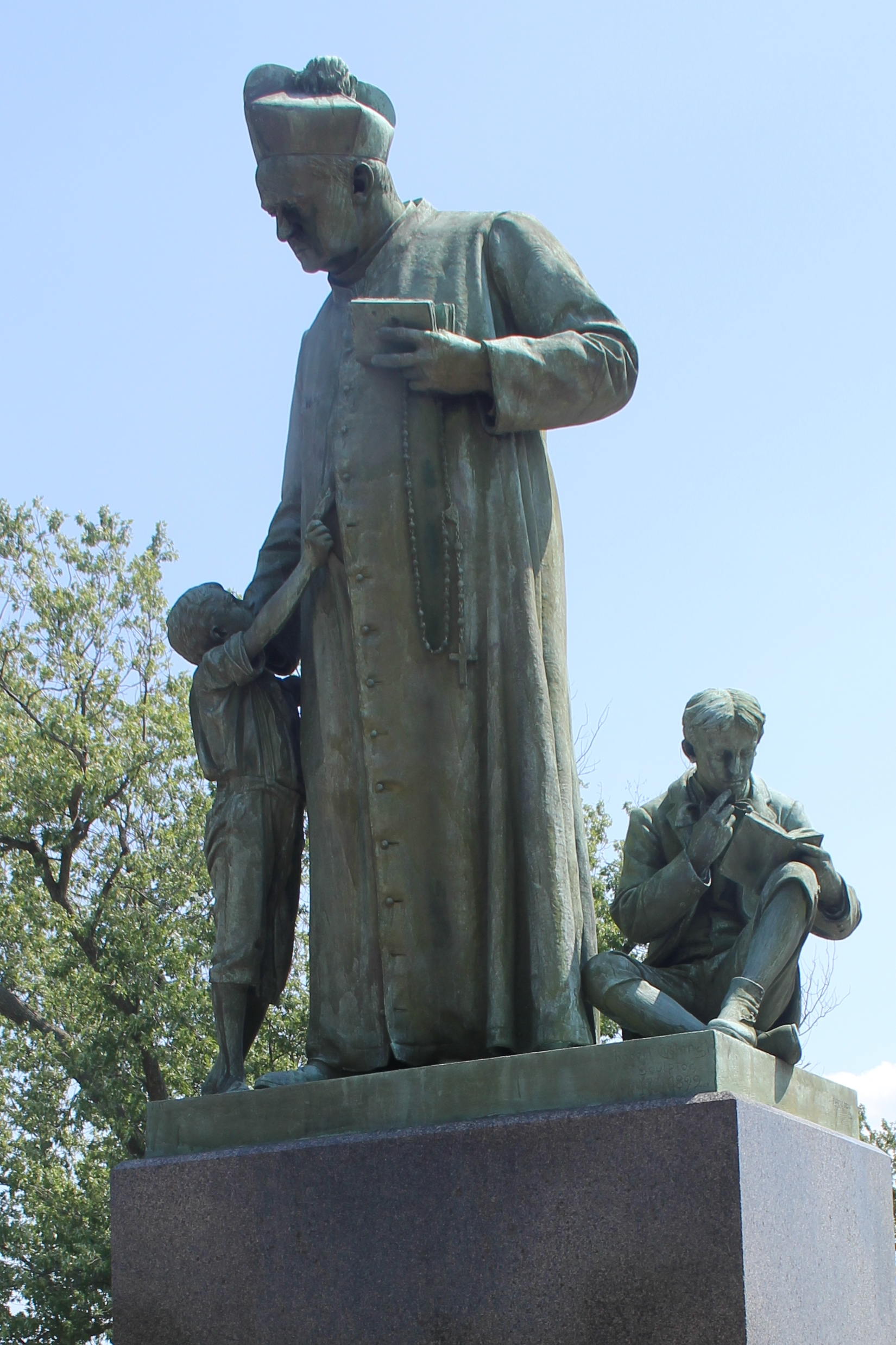
- Statue of Drumgoole at Mount Loretto
- Born: John Christopher Drumgoole; August 15, 1816; Abbeylara, County Longford, Ireland
- Died: March 28, 1888 (aged 71); New York City, United States
- Resting place: Mount Loretto, Staten Island; 40.5143°N 74.2180°W
- Education: Our Lady of Angels Seminary (ordained a priest in 1869)
- Occupations: Roman Catholic priest (later); Sexton (earlier)
- Known for: Caring for homeless newsboys in Manhattan and founding the Mount Loretto orphanage on Staten Island

John Christopher Drumgoole (August 15, 1816 – March 28, 1888) was an Irish-American Roman Catholic priest who was known for his work in caring for and educating orphaned and abandoned children in New York City, especially homeless newsboys.

In 1883, he founded Mount Loretto, an orphanage and vocational school for boys in a then-rural section of Staten Island. It grew into a large complex that housed and educated tens of thousands of boys and girls in more than a century of existence. As of 2024, Drumgoole's Mission of the Immaculate Virgin, now named Catholic Charities of Staten Island, continues to run programs that benefit needy children and other Staten Island residents, on a portion of the Mount Loretto property.

== Life ==
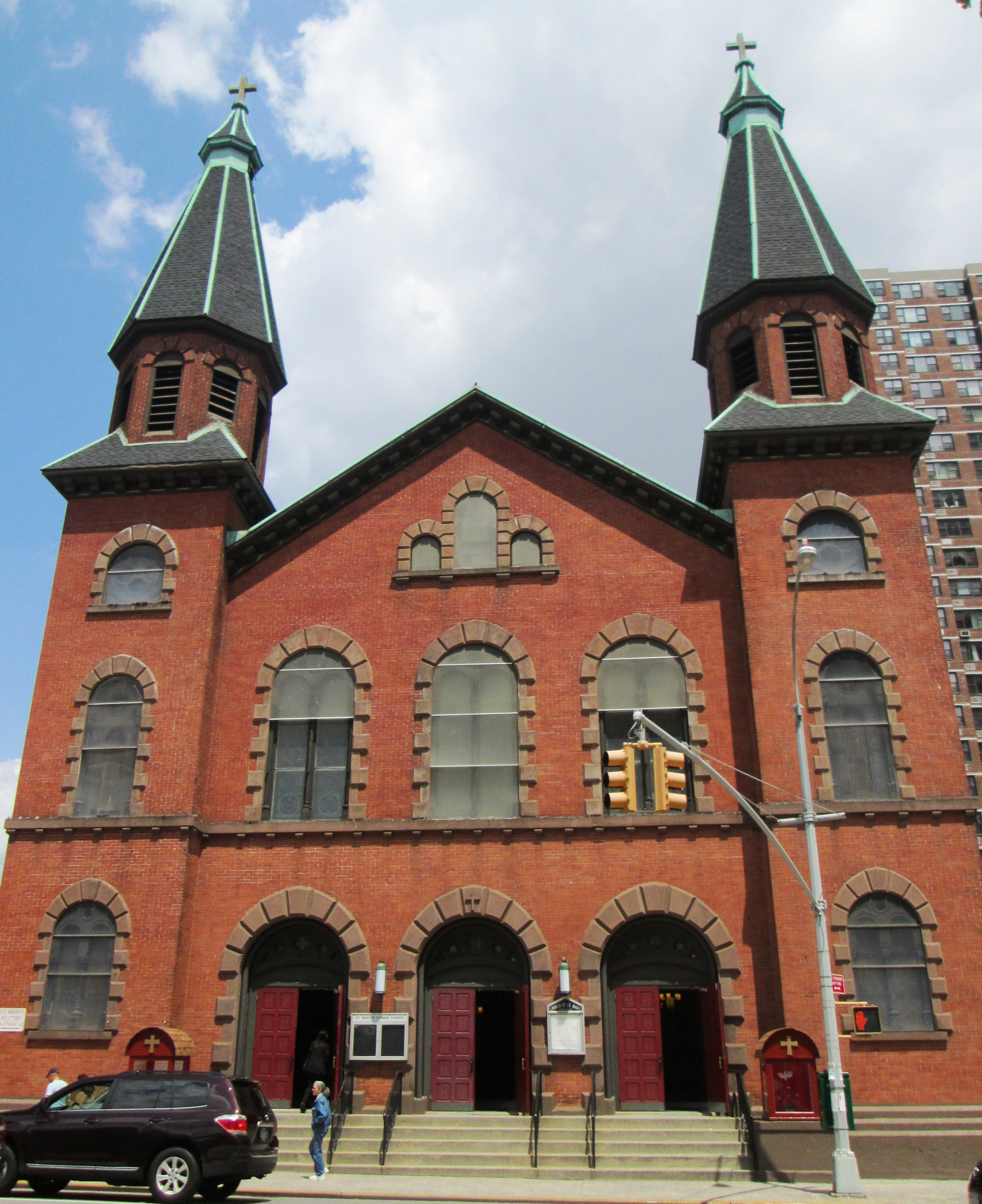
Drumgoole first sheltered needy children at St. Mary's Church on Manhattan's Lower East Side, where he was a sexton

John Christopher Drumgoole was born at Abbeylara near Granard, County Longford, Ireland, on August 15, 1816. His father John, a cobbler, died in 1822. The younger John came to the United States in 1824 at age 8 to join his mother Bridget, who had emigrated first. She worked as a maid, and he became a shoemaker to help support her. In 1838, he became a United States citizen. In 1844, he became sexton/janitor of St. Mary's, New York City's third Roman Catholic parish, founded in 1826 and located in the poor Lower East Side neighborhood. Drumgoole grew concerned for the many homeless and orphaned children who lived on the streets of New York City after the Great Irish Famine (1845–1852) and then the U.S. Civil War (1861–1865). For 21 years, he provided shelter for many of these children in the basement of the church.

Drumgoole had long wished to enter the priesthood, but waited until full provision could be made for his mother's care. In 1863, he commenced his studies, first commuting to St. John's College in Rose Hill and then to St. Francis Xavier College in Chelsea. He entered the Seminary of Our Lady of Angels, near Niagara Falls, in 1865. He was ordained a priest in May 1869, aged 52.

In 1871, he was placed in charge of the "Newsboys' Lodging House", an old warehouse located at 53 Warren Street in Manhattan that the St. Vincent de Paul Society had converted into sleeping quarters. Under Drumgoole's leadership, this program expanded, and he soon found the building inadequate for the needs of his newsboy charges. Seeking funds to build a larger home for newsboys, he founded a new organization, the St. Joseph's Union, and began publishing The Homeless Child and Messenger of St. Joseph's Union. People worldwide subscribed to this publication for 25 cents per year and thereby became members of the union. It was with these funds that Drumgoole was able to build a new mission house at the corner of Great Jones and Lafayette Streets, which came to be known as the Mission of the Immaculate Virgin.

The cornerstone of the Manhattan building was laid in 1879. The plot of land, previously occupied by St. Bartholomew's Episcopal Church, cost $70,000. The nine-story mission house cost $160,000 to build, and was opened in 1881.

== Mount Loretto ==
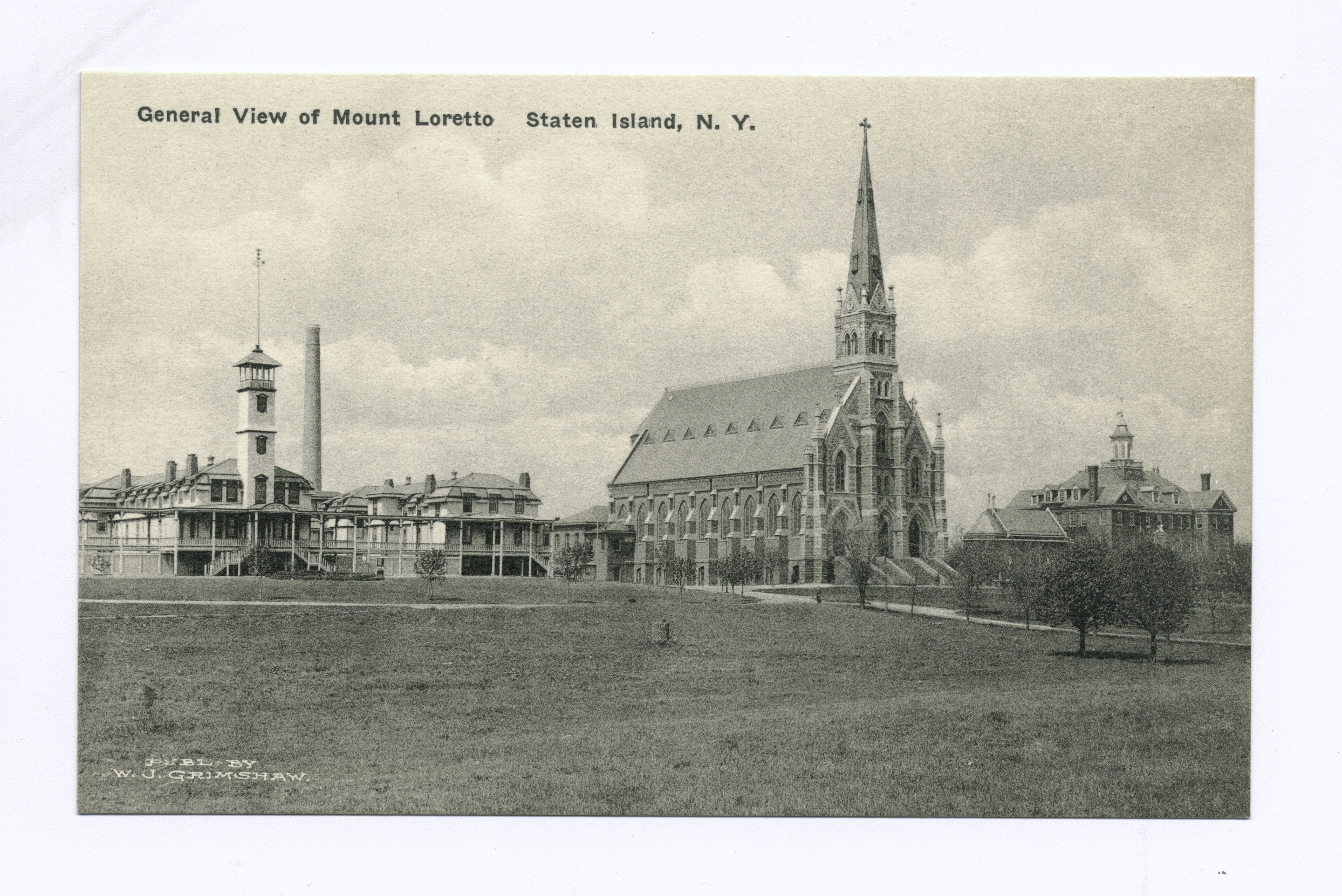
General View of Mount Loretto, Staten Island, N.Y

The Manhattan building was designed to provide light and air to each resident, so as to reduce the spread of influenza and tuberculosis, then-common in the tenements. However, Drumgoole came to feel that the general environment of the City at the time was not healthy for the younger children, so he sought out a more-rural setting. In 1882 he purchased land on Staten Island and in 1883 founded the Mission of the Immaculate Virgin at Mount Loretto, which he named as a tribute to the Franciscan Sisters of the Immaculate Virgin who accompanied him there to teach the children. He designed Mount Loretto to be a self-sufficient farm.

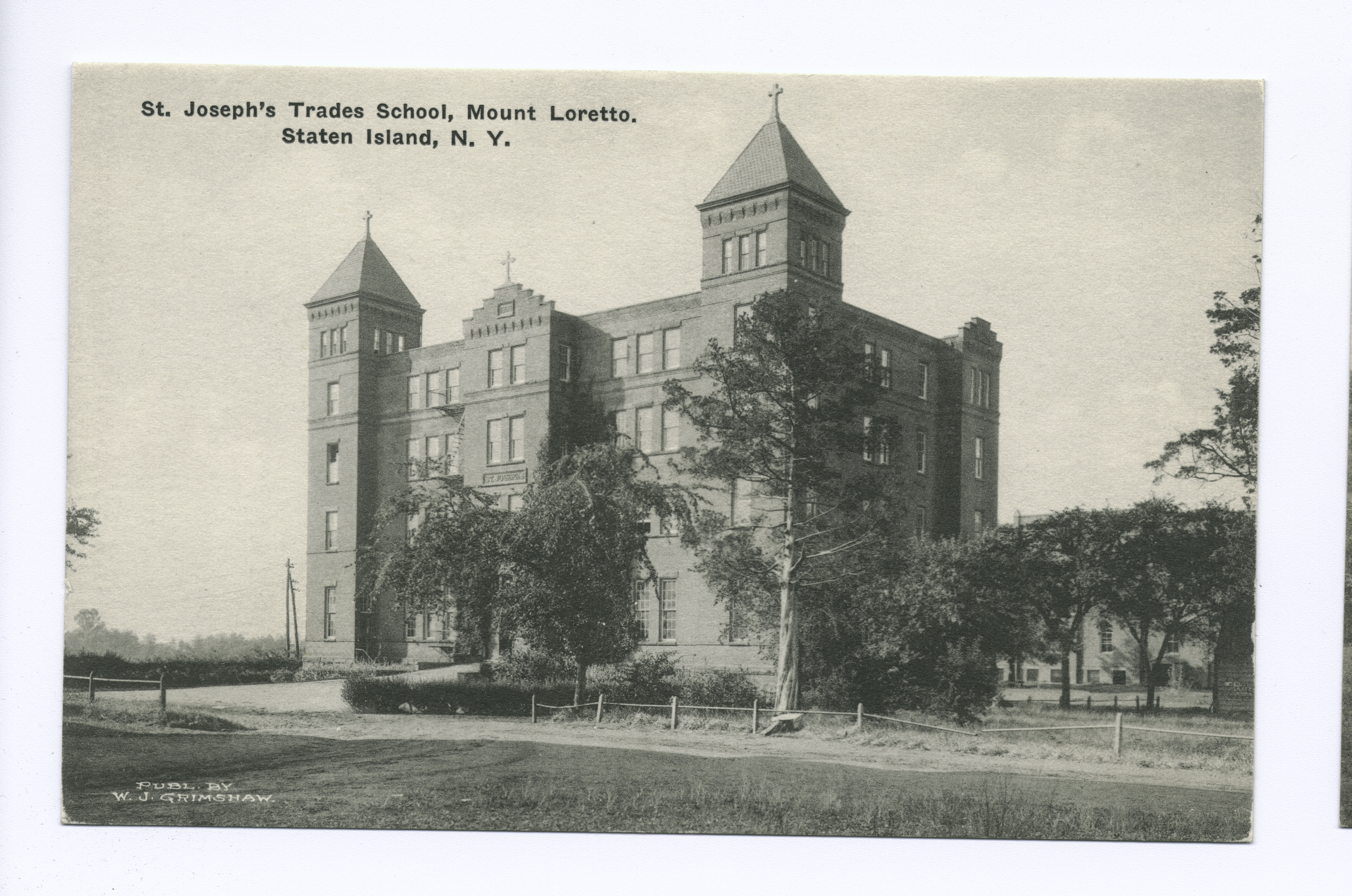
St. Joseph's Trades School, Mount Loretto, Staten Island, N.Y.

In 1891 the Mount Loretto Spur, a mile-long branch of the Staten Island Railway, was built to bring construction material to the Mount Loretto site. Every third Sunday until 1939, the railway operated a special train from St. George Terminal to Mount Loretto and back, for relatives and visitors. The stop was called "Mission Station".

The Church of St. Joachim and St. Anne was constructed in 1891 on the grounds of Mount Loretto, to serve the children and staff of the institution. In addition to traditional schooling by the Sisters, Drumgoole introduced extensive vocational training at the Mission. Children at the St. Joseph's School at Mt. Loretto learned shoemaking, woodworking, baking and printing. They grew their own food, and raised poultry and livestock (including the last cows in New York City when they were sold in 1961 as the orphanage downsized). Drumgoole also organized a brass band. The church and the trade school were planned by him, and were constructed shortly after his death.

== Death ==
Drumgoole divided his time between the mission's facilities in Manhattan and at Mount Loretto. On Sunday, March 11, 1888, he boarded a Staten Island Railway train at the Pleasant Plains station near the orphanage, and rode it to St. George Terminal for the ferry to Manhattan. Upon arriving, he found that no ferries and no further trains were running because the Great Blizzard of 1888 had begun, with severe wind and snow. To return to Mount Loretto, he hired a horse and gig for a long ride through the blizzard. Though he arrived safely and continued to work, he developed a cold that progressed to exhaustion and pneumonia. He collapsed on March 26 while preparing to say Mass at the mission's city house, and died there on March 28. Drumgoole's will left everything he had to the mission, and Archbishop Michael Corrigan led the funeral in St. Patrick's Cathedral on Easter Monday, April 2. A funeral stagecoach, ferry and train carried Drumgoole's sealed casket back to Mount Loretto for burial.

== Legacy ==
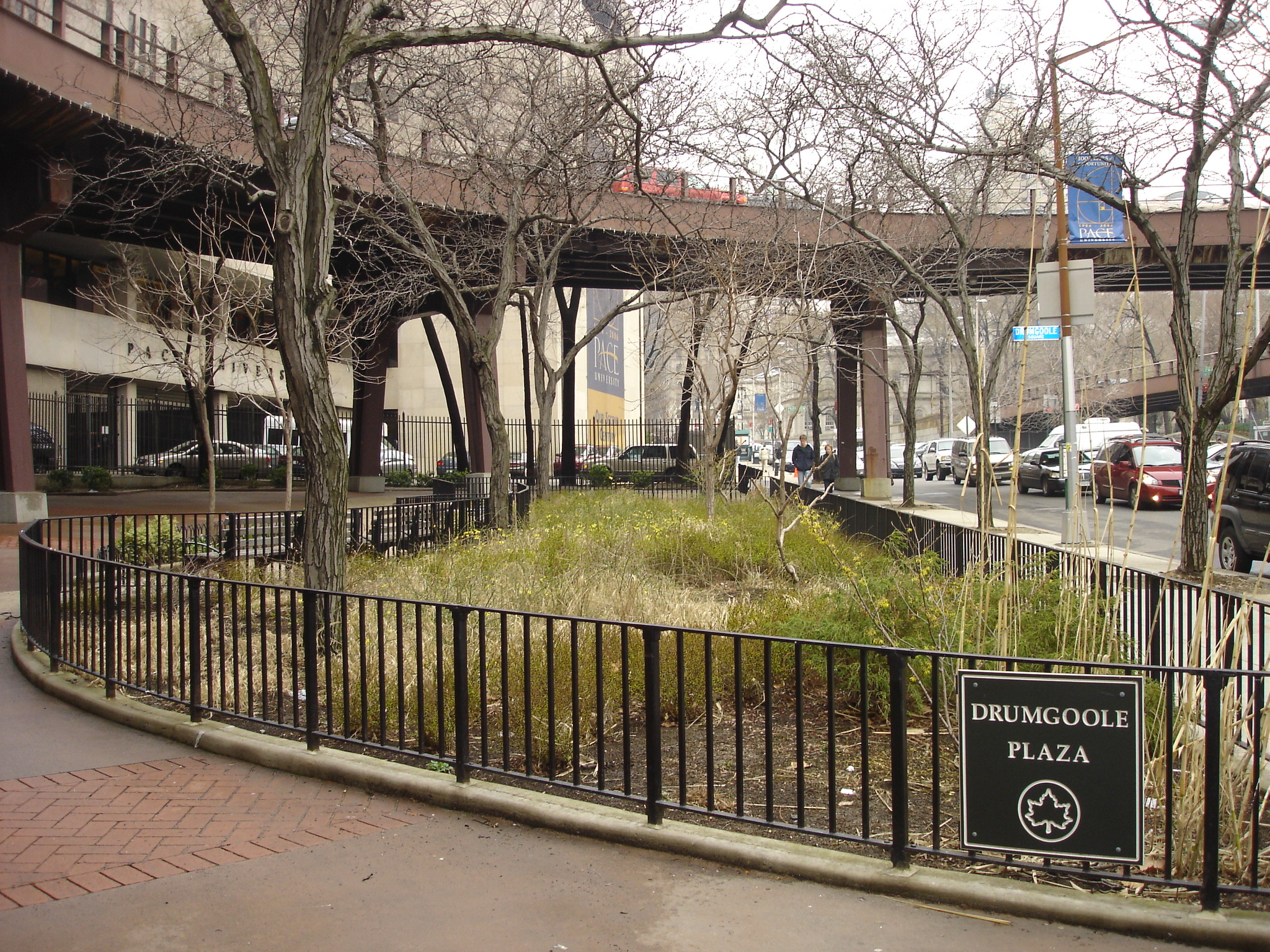
Drumgoole Plaza in Manhattan

Drumgoole was a hero of the newsboys who thronged the area when Manhattan's Park Row was the headquarters of the city's major newspapers, including The New York Times, and he was considered an unofficial patron saint of the homeless, orphans, and the less fortunate. In 1894, a 10-foot (3-meter) bronze statue by Robert Cushing was erected in Drumgoole's honor at Lafayette Street, the site of the Manhattan mission. The statue was moved to Mount Loretto in 1920. The Mission of the Immaculate Virgin has been on its current site in the Pleasant Plains section of Staten Island since 1883. Mount Loretto, an orphanage for boys and later girls as well (1897), was run by the mission for many years. The Mission of the Immaculate Virgin, now named Catholic Charities of Staten Island, continues to provide a variety of social services.

Drumgoole Plaza, a small public park near Park Row in Manhattan, is named in honor of the priest, as are the service roads (Drumgoole Road West/East) of the Korean War Veterans Parkway near Mount Loretto on Staten Island. In 1973, adjacent to Drumgoole Road East, Public School 36 was named the J.C. Drumgoole School. Some in the Catholic Church consider him a candidate for sainthood.

== See also ==
- Protectory#New York Catholic Protectory
