= Terminal Station (Macon, Georgia) =

Train station in Macon, Georgia

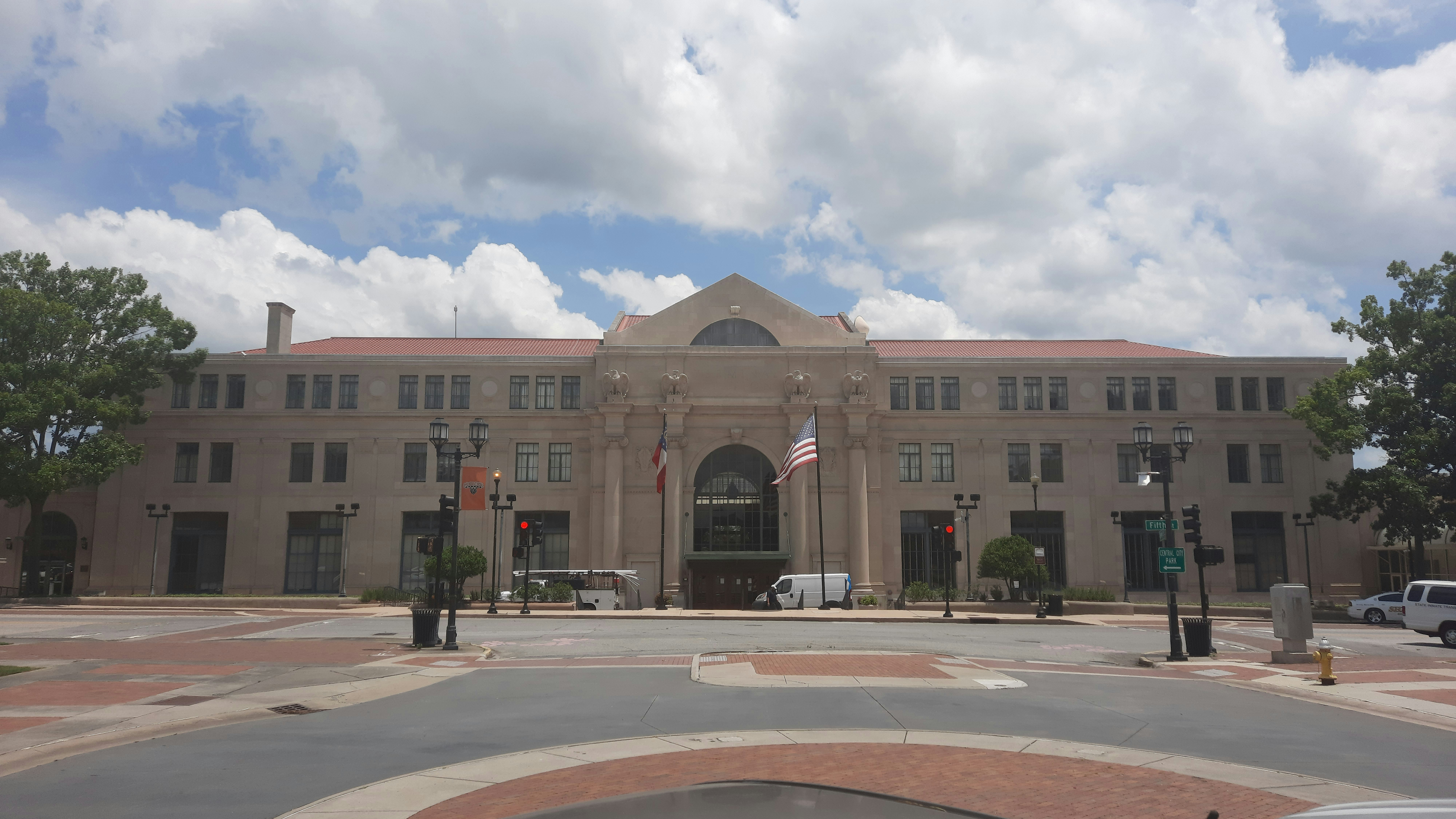
- View of Terminal Station from Cherry Street

General information
- Location: 200 Cherry St, Macon, Georgia; Macon-Bibb County; United States
- Coordinates: 32°50′1.557″N 83°37′34.7658″W
- Owner: Macon-Bibb County Transit Authority
- Transit authority: Macon-Bibb County Transit Authority

Construction
- Structure type: At-grade
- Parking: At street level, on either side of the station
- Architect: Alfred T. Fellheimer
- Architectural style: Beaux-Arts

Other information
- Website: mta-mac.com/terminal-station

History
- Opened: 1916
- Closed: 1971
Former services
Preceding station	Central of Georgia Railway	Following station
Macon Junction toward Atlanta	Main Line	Griswold toward Savannah
Rutland toward Lockhart	Lockhart – Macon	Terminus
Terminus	Macon – Athens	Ocmulgee Bridge toward Athens
Preceding station	Seaboard Air Line Railroad	Following station
Terminus	Macon Subdivision	Smithsonia toward Vidalia
Preceding station	Southern Railway	Following station
Holton toward Chattanooga	Chattanooga – Jacksonville	Reid toward Jacksonville
Preceding station	Georgia Railroad	Following station
Terminus	Camak-Macon	Postell toward Camak
- Macon Historic District (Boundary Increase)
- U.S. National Register of Historic Places
- Location within Georgia
- Location: Roughly, Adams St. and Linden Ave. S, W and N of Tattnall Sq. and Broadway and Third Sts. between Poplar and Pine Sts., Macon, Georgia
- Area: 91 acres (37 ha)
- Built: 1871
- Architectural style: Queen Anne, Bungalow/craftsman, Art Deco
- NRHP reference No.: 95000233
- Added to NRHP: July 27, 1995
Location

Terminal Station, Macon, Georgia, is a railroad station that was built in 1916, and is located on 5th St. at the end of Cherry St. It was designed in the Beaux-Arts style by architect Alfred T. Fellheimer (1875–1959), prominent for his design of Grand Central Terminal in New York City in 1903. The station building is part of the Macon Historic District, which is listed on the National Register of Historic Places. While no longer an active train station, it has been the location of the Macon Transit Authority bus hub since 2014.

== Early history ==
Col. Robert L. Berner, a prominent Macon attorney and former state legislator, filed a petition on September 28, 1912, with the Georgia Railroad Commission, asking that the railroads calling at Macon be required to erect an adequate union passenger station in Macon. His efforts culminated in the construction of Terminal Station, which was officially opened in 1916.

The Terminal Station building has a limestone exterior, with the main lobby and waiting areas having floors and walls of pink Tennessee marble.

Terminal Station encompassed 13 acres and was owned by the Macon Terminal Company. By the mid-1920s, the station dispatched an estimated 100 arrivals and departures per day. The station was served by the Georgia Railroad, Central of Georgia Railway, Macon, Dublin and Savannah Railroad, and Southern Railway.

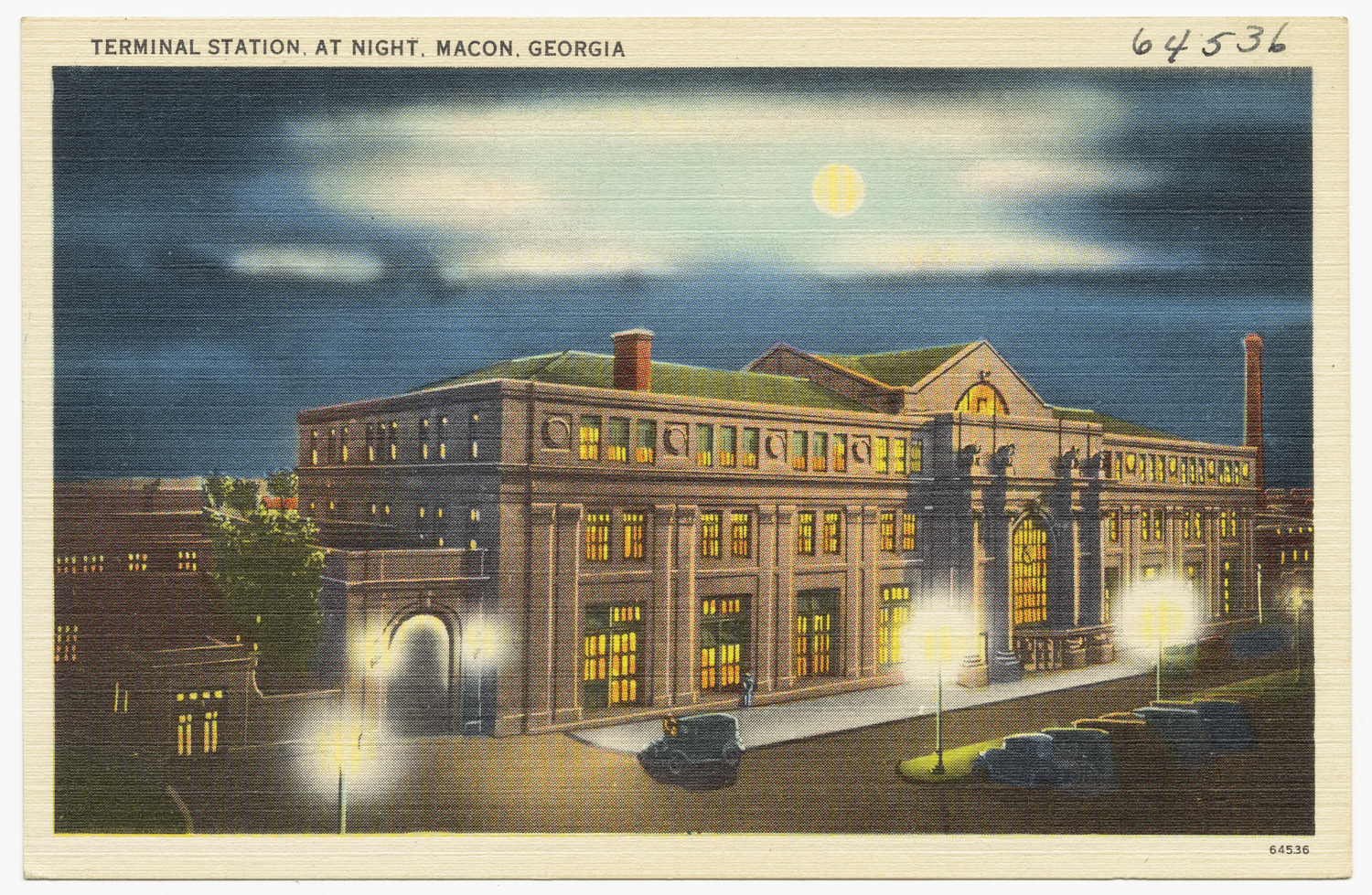
Postcard view of Terminal Station circa 1930

The last trains running from there were the Royal Palm (1970) and the Nancy Hanks (1971). The final run of the Nancy Hanks on April 30, 1971, ended 125 years of intercity rail service in Macon.

A bronze statue of William Morrill Wadley was erected outside the station in 1885, three years after his death.

=== Notable trains ===
- Central of Georgia:
  - Nancy Hanks: Atlanta - Savannah

The Central also operated a Birmingham - Columbus - Savannah night train through the station in the early 1950s.

- Central of Georgia and Louisville & Nashville Railroad:
  - Flamingo: Cincinnati - Knoxville - Atlanta - Jacksonville
  - Southland: Chicago - Cincinnati - Knoxville - Atlanta - St. Petersburg, Sarasota and Miami
- Frisco and Southern:
  - Kansas City-Florida Special: Kansas City - Memphis - Birmingham - Atlanta - Jacksonville
- Southern:
  - Florida Sunbeam: Chicago, Detroit & Cleveland - Miami
  - Ponce de Leon: Cincinnati - Atlanta - Jacksonville
  - Royal Palm: Cincinnati - Atlanta - Jacksonville

== Recent history ==
After almost sixty years of service, Terminal Station closed in 1971, and the building remained unused. In 1982, it was purchased by Georgia Power Company and utilized as offices until the 1990s. The City of Macon purchased the Terminal Station in 2002, and funded the restoration of the building. The city council voted in 2014 to give the property to the Macon Transit Authority.

Greyhound Lines announced in July 2019 that it was moving its existing operations in Macon to the Terminal Station. The stated goal for the move was to bring passengers more local transportation options, namely the Macon Transit Authority's bus hub. In 2020, the Terminal Station was used as a filming location for scenes from the award-winning Amazon series The Underground Railroad.

== Brosnan Yard ==
Occupying the former Central of Georgia shop complex just southwest of the Terminal Station is Norfolk Southern's Brosnan Yard. The rail yard was opened in 1967 and named after William Brosnan, then president of Southern Railway. In 2020, it was announced that Brosnan Yard was one of several yards being idled, as part of Norfolk Southern's transition to precision railroading.
