= Bolingbroke, Georgia =

Unincorporated community in Monroe County, Georgia, United States

Bolingbroke
- Unincorporated community Census-designated place
- Location within Georgia Location within the United States
- Country: United States
- State: Georgia
- County: Monroe

Area
  - Total: 1.92 sq mi (5.0 km^{2})
  - Land: 1.88 sq mi (4.9 km^{2})
  - Water: 0.04 sq mi (0.10 km^{2})
- Elevation: 518 ft (158 m)

Population (2020)
  - Total: 497
  - Density: 264.4/sq mi (102.1/km^{2})
- Time zone: UTC−5 (Eastern (EST))
  - Summer (DST): UTC−4 (EDT)
- ZIP Code: 31004
- FIPS code: 13-09152
- GNIS feature ID: 2812694

Bolingbroke, founded in 1867, is an unincorporated community and census-designated place (CDP) in Monroe County, Georgia, United States. It lies just north of Macon, between Interstates 475 and 75. The community is part of the Macon metropolitan statistical area.

Per the 2020 census, it had a population of 497.

== History ==
The community was named after Henry St John, 1st Viscount Bolingbroke (1678–1751), English philosopher and politician. Georgia General Assembly incorporated the town in 1912. Bolingbroke was dissolved as a municipality in 1995.

== Geography ==
Bolingbroke is located in the southeastern part of Monroe County in between I-75 and I-475. Downtown Macon is 14 miles (23 km) southeast via I-75, and Atlanta is 71 miles (114 km) northwest, also via I-75. According to the U.S. Census Bureau, the Bolingbroke CDP has a total area of 1.9 square miles (4.9 km^{2}), of which 0.04 square miles (0.10 km^{2}), or 2.29%, are water.

== Demographics ==
Historical population
Census	Pop.	Note	%±
2020	497		—
U.S. Decennial Census; 2020

It was first listed as a census designated place in the 2020 census.

Bolingbroke CDP, Georgia – Racial and ethnic composition Note: the US Census treats Hispanic/Latino as an ethnic category. This table excludes Latinos from the racial categories and assigns them to a separate category. Hispanics/Latinos may be of any race.
Race / Ethnicity (NH = Non-Hispanic)	Pop 2020	% 2020
White alone (NH)	443	89.13%
Black or African American alone (NH)	25	5.03%
Native American or Alaska Native alone (NH)	0	0.00%
Asian alone (NH)	1	0.20%
Pacific Islander alone (NH)	0	0.00%
Other race alone (NH)	1	0.20%
Mixed race or Multi-racial (NH)	3	0.60%
Hispanic or Latino (any race)	24	4.83%
Total	497	100.00%

== Events ==
The Bolingbroke Southern Jam music festival has been produced here since 2009. There is an annual Christmas parade.
