= Macon Historic District (Macon, Georgia) =

Historic district in Georgia, United States

- U.S. National Register of Historic Places
- U.S. Historic district
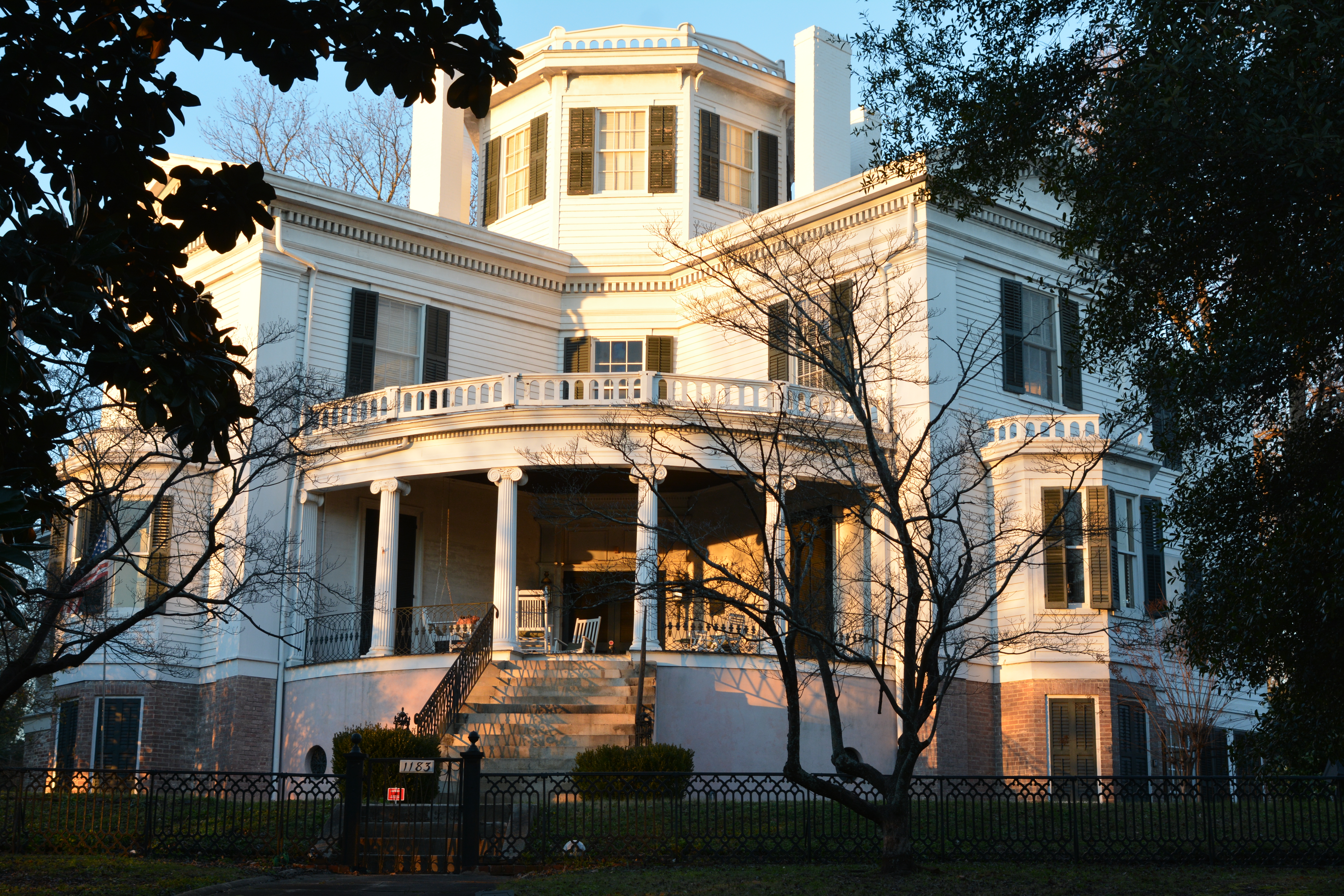
- Raines-Carmichael House, on College St.

- Location within Georgia Location within the United States
- Location: Roughly bounded by Riverside Dr., Broadway, Elm, and I-75, (original); Roughly, Adams St. and Linden Ave. S, W and N of Tattnall Sq. and Broadway and Third Sts. between Poplar and Pine Sts. (increase), Macon, Georgia
- Area: 587 acres (238 ha) (original); 91 acres (37 ha) (increase)
- Built: 1823
- Architect: Multiple
- Architectural style: Greek Revival, Late Victorian, Late 19th And 20th Century Revivals (original); Queen Anne, Bungalow/craftsman, Art Deco (increase)
- NRHP reference No.: 74000658; 95000233

Significant dates
- Added to NRHP: December 31, 1974
- Boundary increase: July 27, 1995

The Macon Historic District is a historic district in Macon, Georgia that was listed on the National Register of Historic Places in 1974 and was expanded in 1995. The original listing covered 587 acres (238 ha) and included 1,050 contributing resources; the increase added 101 acres (41 ha) and 157 contributing resources (of which 10 acres and 10 contributing buildings were already listed on the National Register in the Macon Railroad Industrial District).

Macon was founded in 1823 in Bibb County on the bank of the Ocmulgee River. Many buildings reflect the 19th-century Greek Revival and Victorian styles of architecture. The district has commercial, government, educational, and residential buildings. The majority of their architectural features have been preserved.

A total of 1047 buildings, two structures, and one object contribute to the Macon Historical District. Several of the contributing properties are separately listed on the NRHP.

== History ==
What is now downtown is part of the original 1823 plan of James Webb. In 1836 Macon chartered the first college in the world to grant degrees only to women - originally named Georgia Female College, it is now called Wesleyan College. The original building is located on what is now College Street. Mercer University moved to the area in 1871. The original residential area is known as "College Hill". While many buildings were constructed after the American Civil War, the district includes one of the largest collections of antebellum Greek Revival architecture in the U.S. These still exist because William T. Sherman bypassed Macon in his March to the Sea.

== Historic Macon Foundation ==
The Historic Macon Foundation revitalizes communities by preserving architecture and sharing history. The foundation won the 2018 Trustees Award for Organizational Excellence from the National Trust for Historic Preservation. In 2019 the Foundation held a community meeting to kick off discussion for the Scenic Preservation Index to identify priority places for preservation.

== Contributing buildings ==
The historic district includes 34 buildings that are separately listed on the National Register:

1. Judge Clifford Anderson House
2. Captain R.J. Anderson House
3. Ambrose Baber House
4. Thomas C. Burke House
5. Cannonball House
6. Christ Episcopal Church
7. Cowles House
8. Dasher-Stevens House
9. Domingos House
10. Emerson-Holmes Building
11. First Presbyterian Church
12. Goodall House (now demolished)
13. Grand Opera House
14. Green-Poe House
15. Hatcher-Groover-Schwartz House
16. Holt–Peeler–Snow House
17. Johnston-Hay House
18. Sidney Lanier Cottage
19. Lassiter House
20. W. G. Lee Alumni House
21. Mercer University Administration Building
22. Militia Headquarters Building
23. Monroe Street Apartments
24. Municipal Auditorium (Macon, Georgia)
25. Munroe-Dunlap-Snow House
26. Old Macon Library
27. Old U.S. Post Office and Federal Building (Macon, Georgia)
28. Raines-Carmichael House
29. Randolph-Whittle House
30. Rock Rogers House
31. Slate House
32. Solomon-Curd House
33. St. Joseph's Catholic Church (Macon, Georgia)
34. Willingham-Hill-O'Neal Cottage

Other selected properties include:

- Wells-Hurley-Massey House (1891), with a mansard roof

Architects involved include:

- Elam Alexander
- James B. Ayres
- Elias Carter
- U.S. Treasury
- William Elliot Dunwody, IV
- Dennis and Dennis
- Curran R. Ellis
- Swarthout, Edgerton (or Edgerton Swarthout?)
- Dunwody and Oliphant
- Neel Reid
- Alfred Fellheimer
- Gurdon P. Randall
- Alexander Blair
- Jere Fuss
- A. Sidney Brown

== Photos ==
Macon Historic District
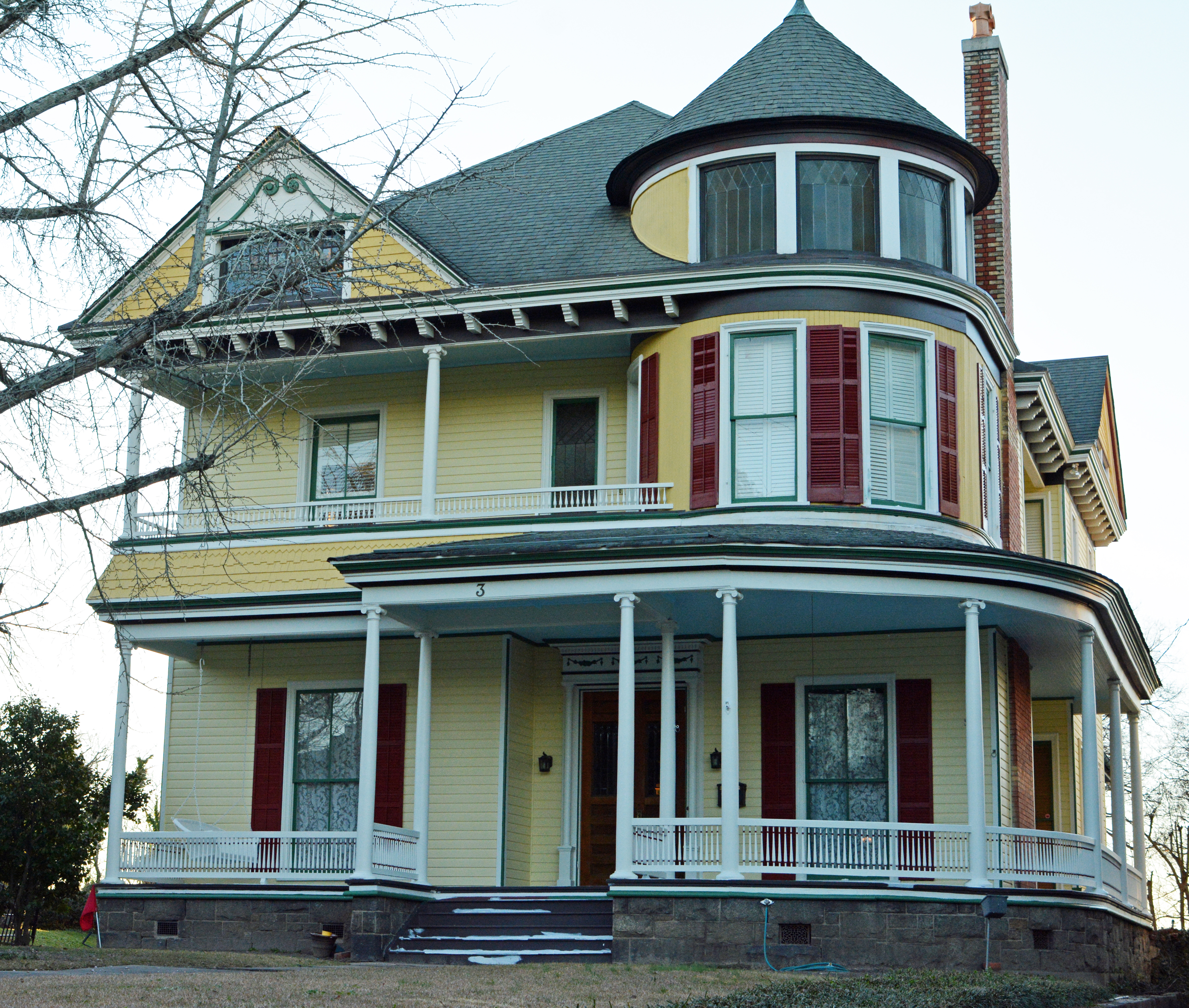
Queen Anne style house on College St.

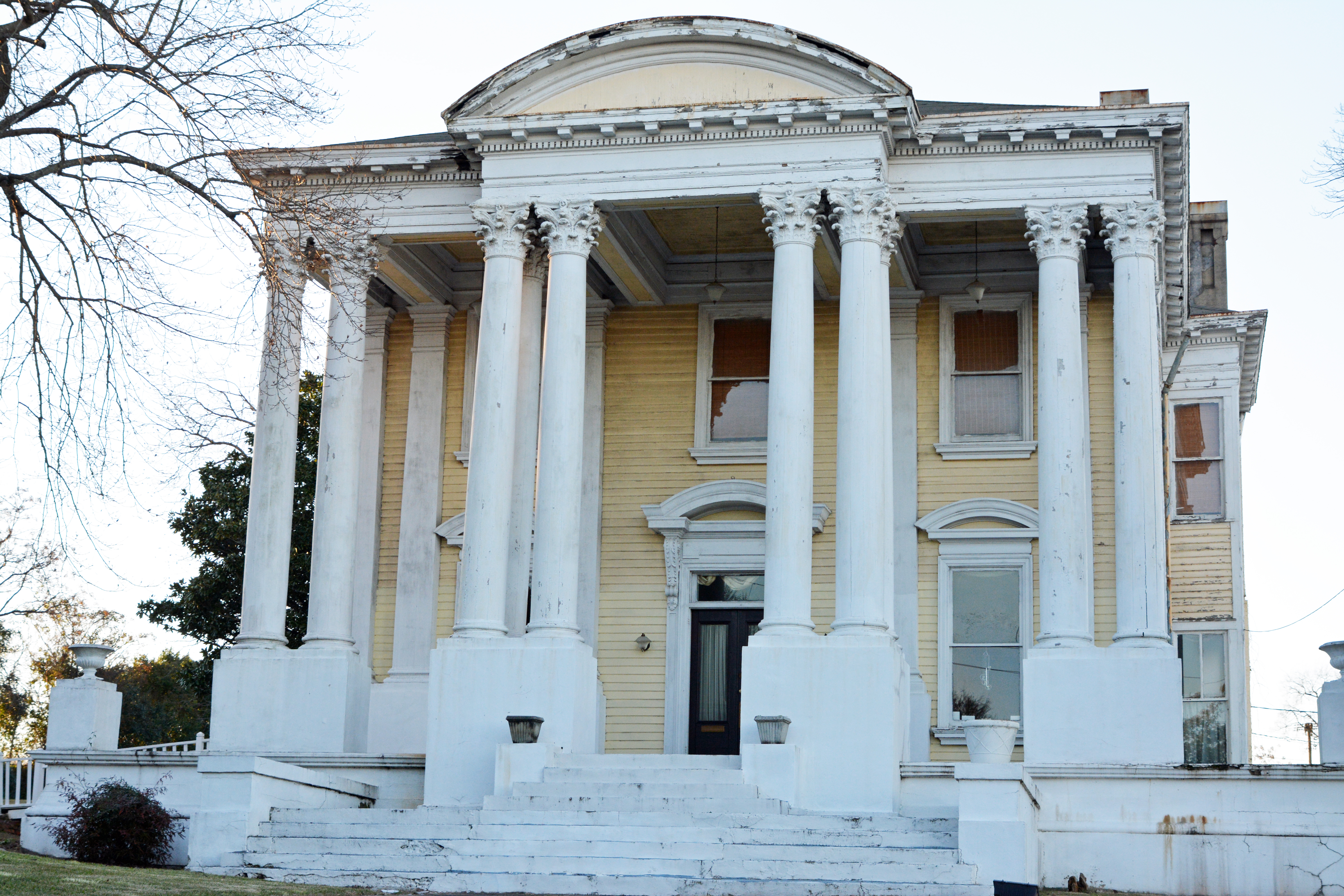
163 College St.

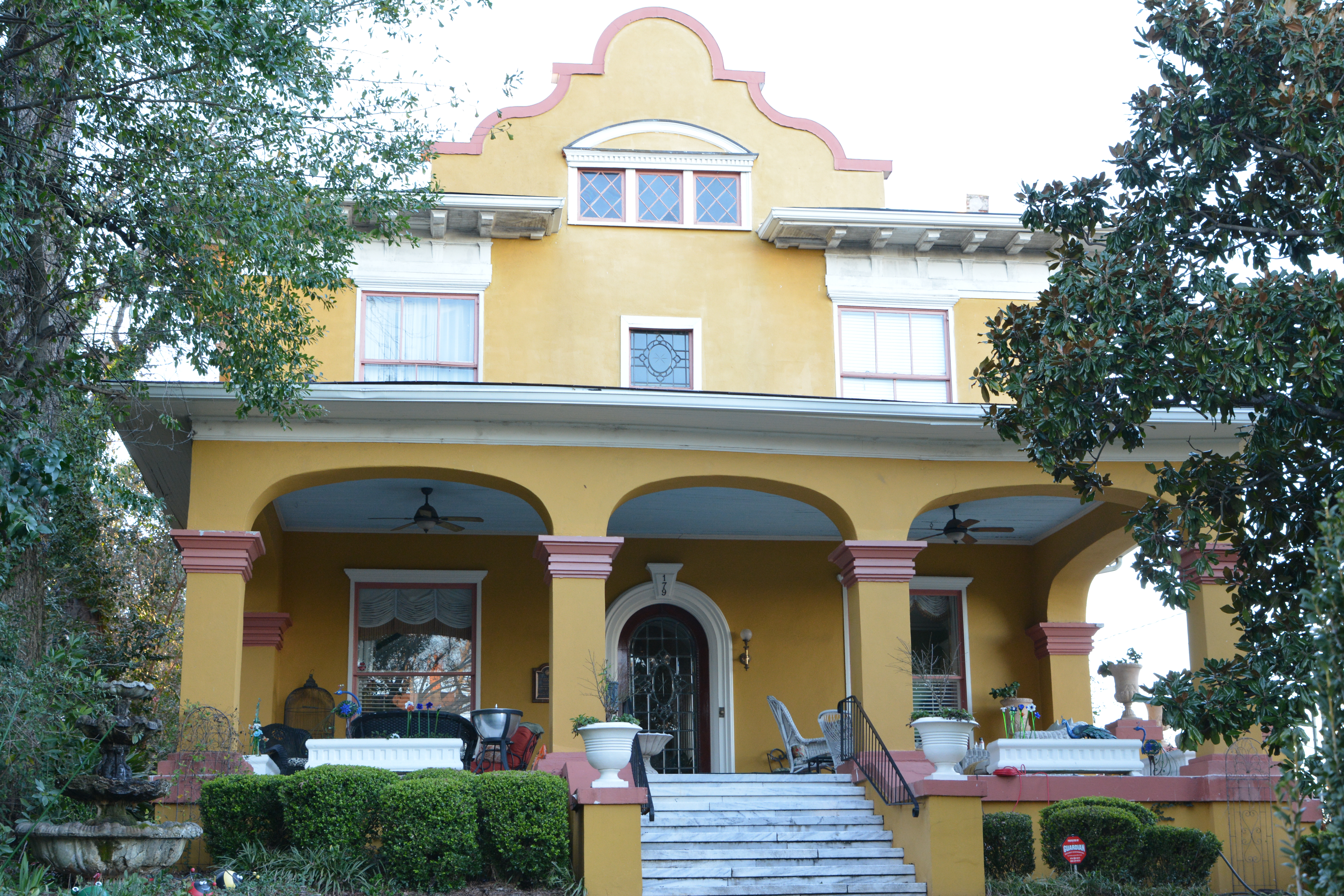
Spanish Revival(?) style house on College St.

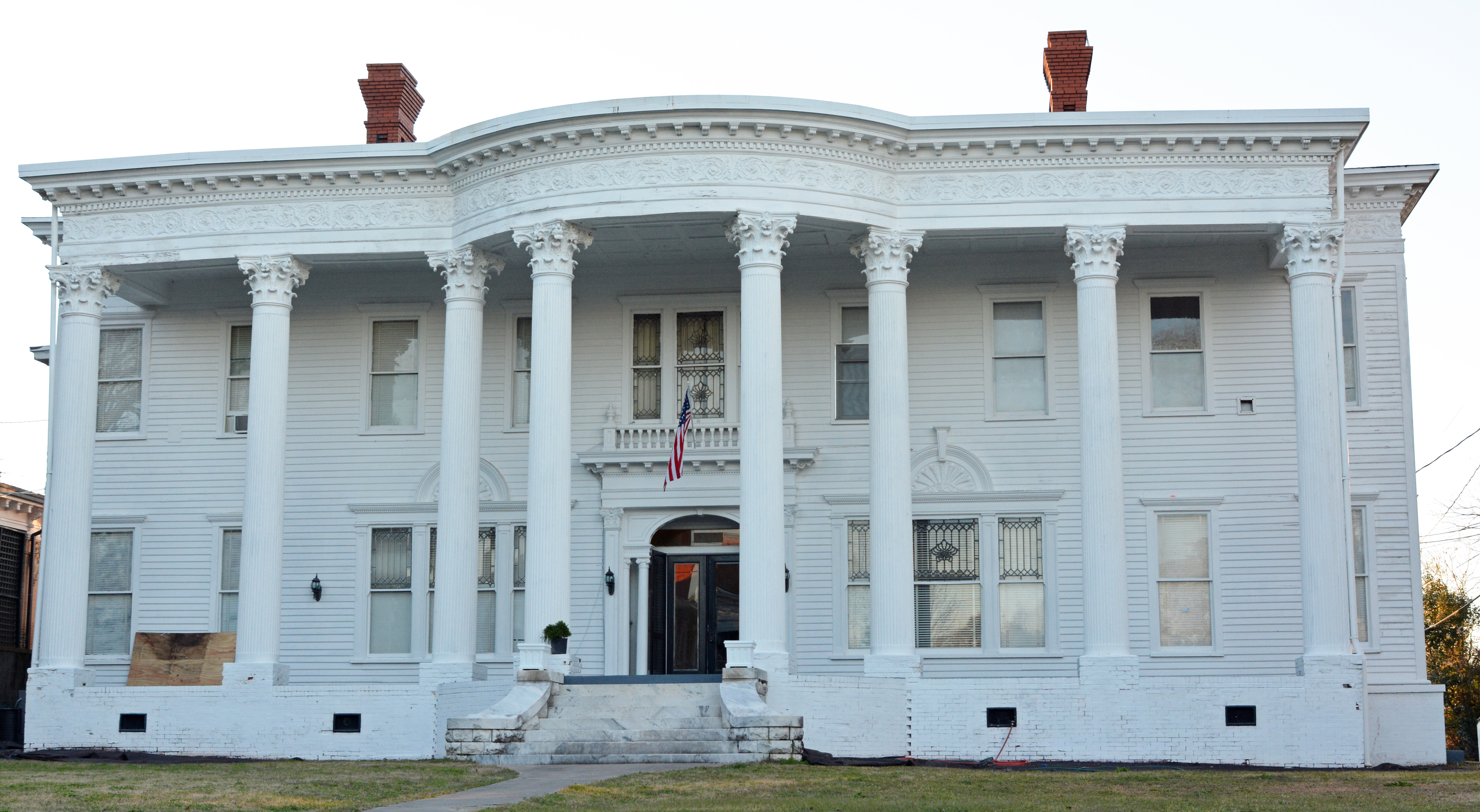
Hubble House, a mansion with Corinthian columned portico on College St. between Walnut and Georgia Sts.

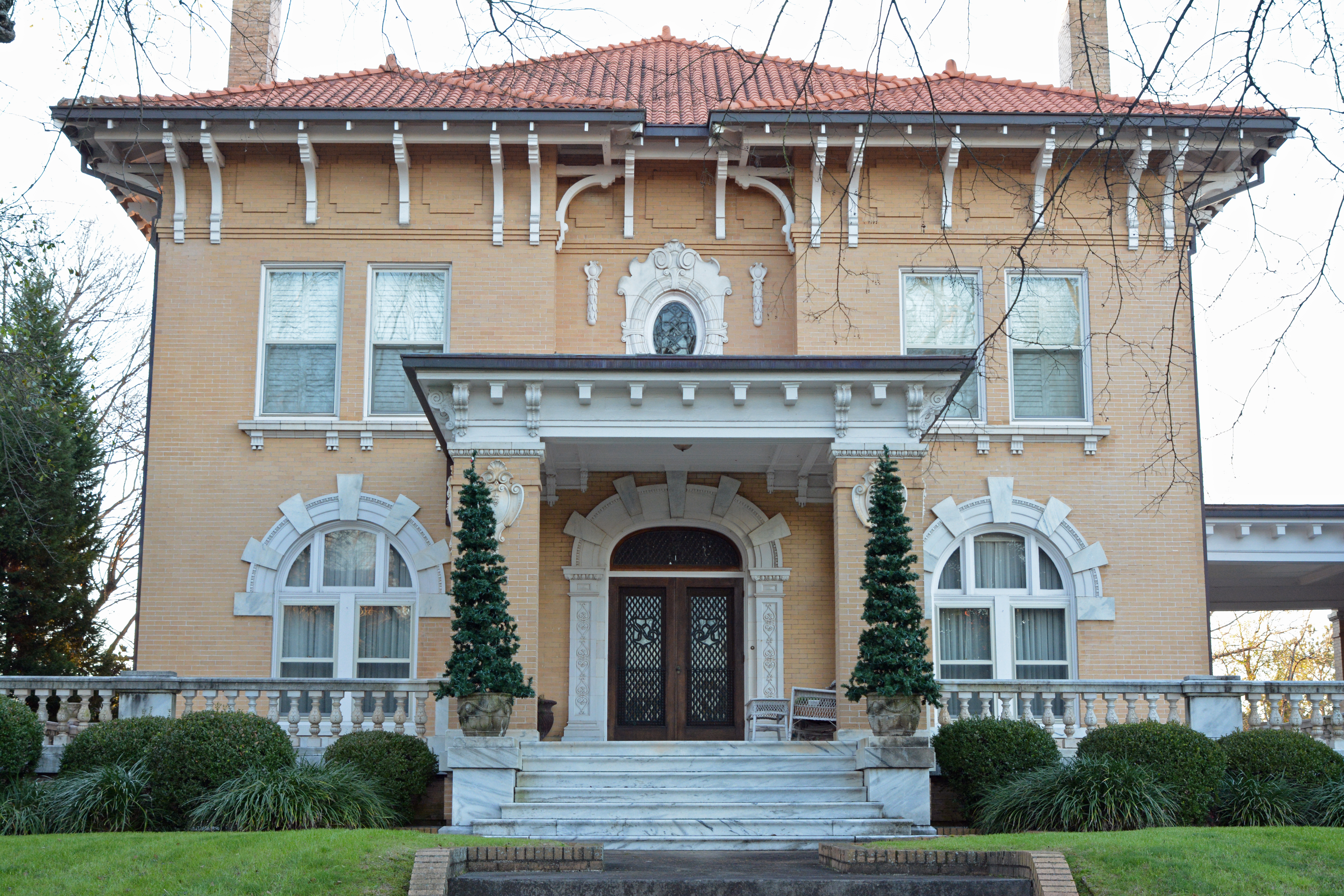
Italianate-style house adjacent to Hubble House

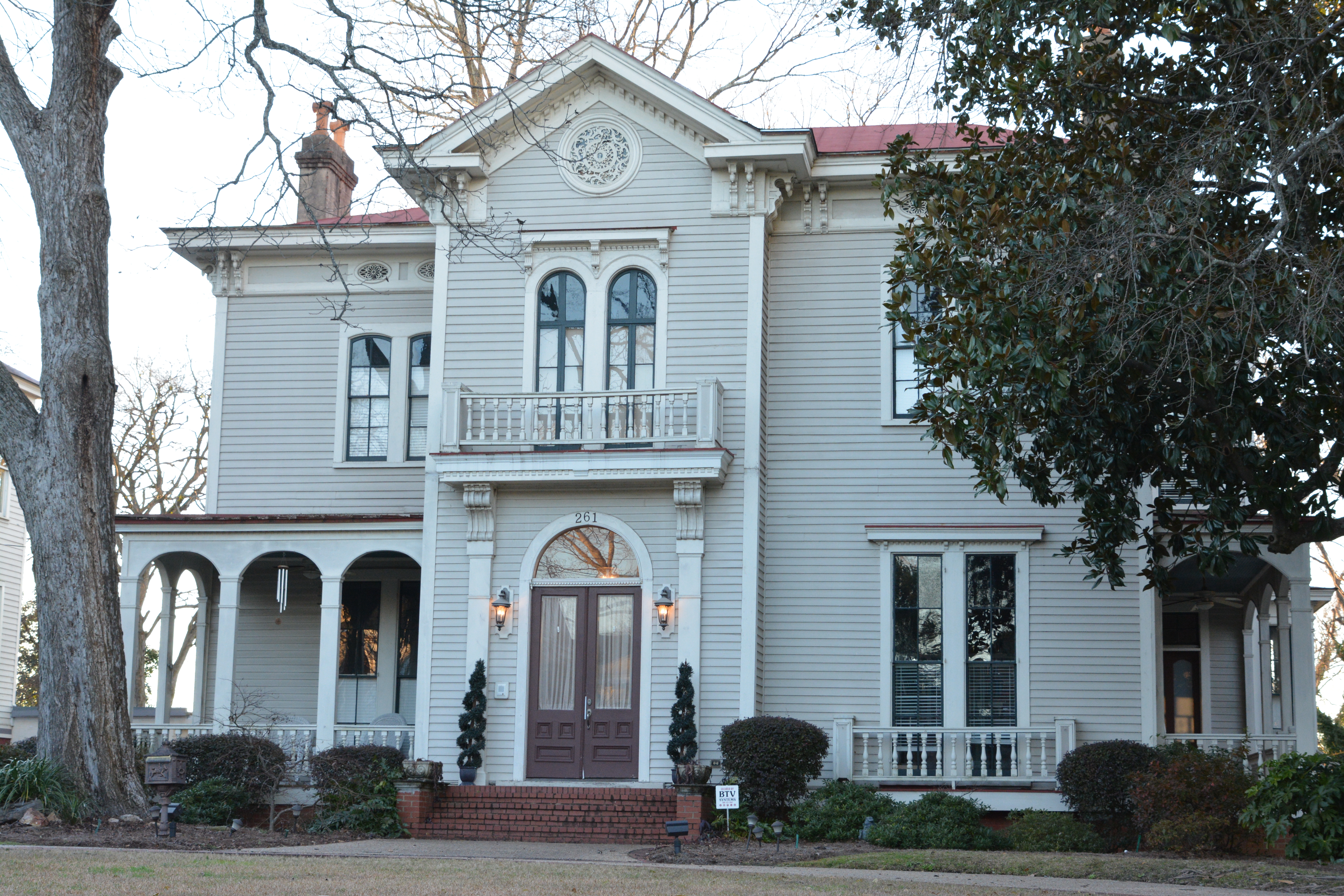
261 College St.

== See also ==
- National Register of Historic Places listings in Bibb County, Georgia
