= National Register of Historic Places listings in Bibb County, Georgia =

Map highlighting Bibb County in Georgia

This is a list of properties and districts in Bibb County, Georgia that are listed on the National Register of Historic Places (NRHP).

This National Park Service list is complete through NPS recent listings posted July 10, 2026.

== Current listings ==
	Name on the Register	Image	Date listed	Location	City or town	Description
1	Capt. R. J. Anderson House	Capt. R. J. Anderson House	May 27, 1971 (#71000246)	1730 West End Ave. 32°49′54″N 83°39′08″W	Macon	
2	Judge Clifford Anderson House	Judge Clifford Anderson House	July 14, 1971 (#71000247)	642 Orange St. 32°50′10″N 83°38′18″W	Macon	
3	Ambrose Baber House	Ambrose Baber House	August 14, 1973 (#73000608)	577-587 Walnut St. 32°50′20″N 83°37′35″W	Macon	
4	Charles L. Bowden Golf Course	Charles L. Bowden Golf Course	February 23, 2015 (#15000024)	3111 Millerfield Rd. 32°51′48″N 83°34′09″W	Macon	
5	Thomas C. Burke House	Thomas C. Burke House	June 21, 1971 (#71000248)	1085 Georgia Ave. 32°50′27″N 83°38′12″W	Macon	
6	Cannonball House	Cannonball House	May 27, 1971 (#71000249)	856 Mulberry St. 32°50′24″N 83°37′56″W	Macon	
7	Central City Park Bandstand	Central City Park Bandstand	March 16, 1972 (#72000361)	Central City Park; 32°49′59″N 83°36′55″W	Macon	
8	Cherokee Brick and Tile Company	Cherokee Brick and Tile Company	April 11, 2002 (#02000338)	3250 Waterville Rd. 32°46′01″N 83°37′24″W	Macon	
9	Cherokee Heights District		July 8, 1982 (#82002385)	Pio Nono, Napier, Inverness, and Suwanee Aves. 32°50′17″N 83°39′58″W	Macon	
10	Christ Episcopal Church	Christ Episcopal Church	July 14, 1971 (#71000250)	538-566 Walnut St. 32°50′18″N 83°37′35″W	Macon	
11	Collins-Odom-Strickland House	Collins-Odom-Strickland House	January 22, 1979 (#79000698)	1495 2nd St. 32°49′25″N 83°38′23″W	Macon	
12	Cowles House	Cowles House	June 21, 1971 (#71000251)	988 Bond St. 32°50′32″N 83°38′04″W	Macon	
13	Jerry Cowles Cottage	Jerry Cowles Cottage	June 21, 1971 (#71000252)	4569 Rivoli Dr. 32°52′26″N 83°42′17″W	Macon	
14	Dasher-Stevens House	Dasher-Stevens House	October 18, 1972 (#72000362)	904 Orange Ter. 32°49′59″N 83°38′20″W	Macon	
15	Davis-Guttenberger-Rankin House	Davis-Guttenberger-Rankin House	November 30, 1973 (#73000609)	134 Buford Pl. 32°50′47″N 83°39′35″W	Macon	
16	Domingos House	Domingos House	June 21, 1971 (#71000253)	1261 Jefferson Ter. 32°50′28″N 83°38′22″W	Macon	
17	East Macon Historic District		April 1, 1993 (#93000281)	Roughly bounded by Emery Hwy., Coliseum Dr., and Clinton, Fletcher and Fairview Sts. 32°50′42″N 83°36′43″W	Macon	
18	Emerson-Holmes Building	Emerson-Holmes Building	June 21, 1971 (#71000254)	566 Mulberry St. 32°50′13″N 83°37′39″W	Macon	
19	Robert Findlay House		January 20, 1972 (#72000363)	785 2nd St. 32°49′54″N 83°38′01″W	Macon	Demolished
20	First Presbyterian Church	First Presbyterian Church	September 14, 1972 (#72000364)	690 Mulberry St. 32°50′17″N 83°37′47″W	Macon	
21	Fort Hawkins Archeological Site	Fort Hawkins Archeological Site	November 23, 1977 (#77000410)	Address Restricted 32.8489°N 83.6116°W	Macon	
22	Fort Hill Historic District		April 16, 1993 (#93000313)	Roughly bounded by Emery Hwy., Second St. Ext., Mitchell and Morrow Sts. and Schaeffer Pl. 32°51′06″N 83°36′51″W	Macon	
23	Georgia Industrial Home	Georgia Industrial Home	December 9, 2019 (#100004743)	4690 North Mumford Rd. 32°50′50″N 83°42′49″W	Macon	
24	Grand Opera House	Grand Opera House	June 22, 1970 (#70000196)	651 Mulberry St. 32°50′20″N 83°37′42″W	Macon	
25	Green-Poe House	Green-Poe House	July 14, 1971 (#71000256)	841-845 Poplar St. 32°50′15″N 83°38′01″W	Macon	
26	Hatcher-Groover-Schwartz House	Hatcher-Groover-Schwartz House	June 21, 1971 (#71000257)	1144-1146 Georgia Ave. 32°50′27″N 83°38′15″W	Macon	
27	Walter R. Holt House	Walter R. Holt House	February 24, 2005 (#05000076)	3776 Vineville Ave. 32°51′13″N 83°41′15″W	Macon	
28	Holt–Peeler–Snow House	Holt–Peeler–Snow House	June 21, 1971 (#71000258)	1129 Georgia Ave. 32°50′28″N 83°38′14″W	Macon	
29	Ingleside Historic District	Ingleside Historic District	May 10, 2016 (#16000231)	Roughly bounded by Vineville Ave, Candler Dr, Bonita Pl, High Point Rd, and Forest Hill Rd. 32°51′26″N 83°40′46″W	Macon	
30	Johnston-Hay House	Johnston-Hay House	May 27, 1971 (#71000259)	934 Georgia Ave. 32°50′25″N 83°38′01″W	Macon	National Historic Landmark
31	Sidney Lanier Cottage	Sidney Lanier Cottage	January 31, 1972 (#72000365)	935 High St. 32°50′15″N 83°38′11″W	Macon	(see Sidney Lanier )
32	Lassiter House	Lassiter House	April 11, 1972 (#72000366)	315 College St. 32°50′32″N 83°38′17″W	Macon	Built in 1855, also known as the Beall House, now houses the Robert McDuffee Center for Strings, website
33	Ellamae Ellis League House	Ellamae Ellis League House	February 15, 2005 (#05000053)	1790 Waverland Dr. 32°52′14″N 83°37′56″W	Macon	Also in the Shirley Hills Historic District
34	Joseph and Mary Jane League House	Joseph and Mary Jane League House	January 9, 2009 (#08001280)	1849 Waverland Dr. 32°52′24″N 83°37′54″W	Macon	Also in the Shirley Hills Historic District
35	W. G. Lee Alumni House	W. G. Lee Alumni House	July 14, 1971 (#71000260)	1270 Ash (Coleman) St. 32°49′52″N 83°38′49″W	Macon	
36	William and Jane Levitt House	William and Jane Levitt House	January 26, 2016 (#15000996)	3720 Overlook Dr. 32°51′54″N 83°41′01″W	Macon	
37	Lustron House at 3498 McKenzie Drive	Lustron House at 3498 McKenzie Drive	March 18, 1996 (#96000216)	3498 McKenzie Dr. 32°50′53″N 83°40′58″W	Macon	
38	Macon Historic District	Macon Historic District	December 31, 1974 (#74000658)	Roughly bounded by Riverside Dr., Broadway, Elm, and I-75; 32°50′11″N 83°38′11″W	Macon	This HD contains some of the other NRHP buildings
39	Macon Railroad Industrial District	Macon Railroad Industrial District	June 12, 1987 (#87000977)	Roughly bounded by Fifth, Sixth, and Seventh Sts., Central of Georgia, Southern, and Seaboard RR tracks 32°49′31″N 83°37′33″W	Macon	Includes the Old City Cemetery
40	Macon Railway and Light Company Substation	Macon Railway and Light Company Substation	November 9, 2006 (#06000986)	1015 Riverside Dr. 32°50′41″N 83°37′53″W	Macon	
41	DeWitt McCrary House	DeWitt McCrary House	March 22, 1974 (#74000659)	320 Hydrolia St. 32°50′37″N 83°37′00″W	Macon	
42	Mechanics Engine House No. 4	Mechanics Engine House No. 4	September 13, 1990 (#90001434)	950 Third St. 32°49′43″N 83°37′58″W	Macon	
43	Mercer University Administration Building	Mercer University Administration Building	August 26, 1971 (#71000261)	Coleman Ave. 32°49′54″N 83°38′54″W	Macon	
44	A.L. Miller High School and A.L. Miller Junior High School	A.L. Miller High School and A.L. Miller Junior High School	November 19, 2014 (#14000928)	2241 Montpelier Ave. 32°50′01″N 83°39′30″W	Macon	
45	Militia Headquarters Building	Militia Headquarters Building	April 11, 1972 (#72000367)	552-564 Mulberry St. 32°50′14″N 83°37′39″W	Macon	Building at left edge of photo. Is demolished, site is now an alley/parking area.
46	Monroe Street Apartments	Monroe Street Apartments	March 16, 1972 (#72000368)	641-661 Monroe St. 32°50′19″N 83°38′38″W	Macon	
47	Municipal Auditorium	Municipal Auditorium	June 21, 1971 (#71000262)	415-435 1st St. 32°50′14″N 83°37′53″W	Macon	
48	Munroe-Dunlap-Snow House	Munroe-Dunlap-Snow House	July 14, 1971 (#71000263)	920 High St. 32°50′13″N 83°38′10″W	Macon	
49	Munroe-Goolsby House	Munroe-Goolsby House	January 20, 1972 (#72000369)	159 Rogers Ave. 32°50′50″N 83°39′18″W	Macon	
50	Napier Heights Historic District		August 6, 2020 (#100005424)	Roughly bounded by Brentwood and Montpelier Aves., Winship St., I 75, Dannenberg Ave., Lasseter Pl., and Whitehall St. 32°50′10″N 83°39′33″W	Macon	
51	Leroy Napier House		May 27, 1971 (#71000264)	2215 Napier Ave. 32°50′13″N 83°39′18″W	Macon	Moved to Clayton County in 2007
52	North Highlands Historic District	North Highlands Historic District	November 22, 1993 (#93000297)	Roughly bounded by Nottingham Dr., Boulevard and Clinton Rd. 32°51′19″N 83°37′25″W	Macon	
53	Ocmulgee National Monument	Ocmulgee National Monument	October 15, 1966 (#66000099)	1207 Emory Hwy., E of Macon; 32°49′46″N 83°36′07″W	Macon	administered by the National Park Service
54	Old Macon Library	Old Macon Library	November 26, 1973 (#73000610)	652-662 Mulberry St. 32°50′16″N 83°37′44″W	Macon	
55	Old U.S. Post Office and Federal Building	Old U.S. Post Office and Federal Building	January 20, 1972 (#72000370)	475 Mulberry St. 32°50′13″N 83°37′32″W	Macon	
56	Pleasant Hill Historic District	Pleasant Hill Historic District	May 22, 1986 (#86001130)	Roughly bounded by Sheridan Ave. and Schofield St., Madison, Jefferson and Ferguson, and Galliard Sts. 32°50′48″N 83°38′45″W	Macon	
57	James and Olive Porter House	James and Olive Porter House	January 31, 2019 (#100003381)	231 Tucker Rd. 32°52′21″N 83°42′49″W	Macon	Moved from Allen St. to Tucker Road on the campus of Wesleyan College
58	Railroad Overpass at Ocmulgee	Railroad Overpass at Ocmulgee	December 18, 1979 (#79000699)	Off GA 49; 32°50′29″N 83°36′00″W	Macon	In the Ocmulgee National Monument
59	Raines-Carmichael House	Raines-Carmichael House	June 21, 1971 (#71000265)	1183 Georgia Ave. 32°50′29″N 83°38′15″W	Macon	National Historic Landmark
60	Randolph-Whittle House	Randolph-Whittle House	February 1, 1972 (#72000371)	1231 Jefferson Ter. 32°50′27″N 83°38′18″W	Macon	
61	Riverside Cemetery	Riverside Cemetery	April 28, 1983 (#83000183)	1301 Riverside Dr. 32°51′04″N 83°38′18″W	Macon	
62	Rock Rogers House	Rock Rogers House	January 20, 1972 (#72000372)	331 College St. 32°50′33″N 83°38′17″W	Macon	
63	Rose Hill Cemetery	Rose Hill Cemetery	October 9, 1973 (#73000611)	Riverside Dr. 32°50′52″N 83°38′01″W	Macon	
64	Shirley Hills Historic District	Shirley Hills Historic District	August 17, 1989 (#89001093)	Roughly Senate Pl., Parkview Dr., Curry Dr., Briarcliff Rd., Nottingham Dr., and the Ocmulgee River; also roughly bounded by Boulevard Ave., Woodland Dr., Waveland Cir., Nottingham, Briarcliff & Upper River Rds. 32°51′33″N 83°37′50″W	Macon	Boundary increase on May 28, 2014 (#14000269)
65	Slate House	Slate House	January 21, 1974 (#74000660)	931-945 Walnut St. 32°50′32″N 83°37′54″W	Macon	
66	Small House	Small House	May 27, 1971 (#71000266)	156 Rogers Ave. 32°50′50″N 83°39′21″W	Macon	
67	Solomon-Curd House		May 27, 1971 (#71000267)	770 Mulberry St. 32°50′22″N 83°37′51″W	Macon	Gutted by fire January 1977; razed in 1979.
68	Solomon-Smith-Martin House	Solomon-Smith-Martin House	July 14, 1971 (#71000268)	2619 Vineville Ave. 32°50′47″N 83°39′47″W	Macon	
69	St. Joseph's Catholic Church	St. Joseph's Catholic Church	July 14, 1971 (#71000269)	812 Poplar St. 32°50′12″N 83°38′01″W	Macon	
70	Tindall Heights Historic District		July 1, 1993 (#93000587)	Roughly bounded by Broadway, Eisenhower Pkwy., Felton and Nussbaum Aves., Central of Georgia RR tracks and Oglethorpe St; 32°49′24″N 83°38′36″W	Macon	
71	Villa Albicini	Villa Albicini	May 16, 1974 (#74000661)	150 Tucker Rd. 32°52′26″N 83°42′41″W	Macon	
72	Vineville Historic District	Vineville Historic District	November 21, 1980 (#80000974)	GA 247 and U.S. 41; 32°50′46″N 83°39′33″W	Macon	
73	Wesleyan College Historic District	Wesleyan College Historic District	April 2, 2004 (#04000242)	4760 Forsyth Rd. 32°52′20″N 83°43′08″W	Macon	a historic district at Wesleyan College
74	Luther Williams Field	Luther Williams Field	June 24, 2004 (#04000627)	225 Willie Smokey Glover Blvd., Central City Park; 32°49′44″N 83°36′51″W	Macon	
75	Willingham-Hill-O'Neal Cottage	Willingham-Hill-O'Neal Cottage	July 14, 1971 (#71000270)	535 College St. 32°50′19″N 83°38′22″W	Macon	

== Former listings ==
	Name on the Register	Image	Date listed	Date removed	Location	City or town	Description
1	Goodall House		May 27, 1971 (#71000255)	July 16, 2026	618 Orange St. 32°50′11″N 83°38′17″W	Macon	Demolished in 1975 to build a medical office building. Uproar over this spurred the creation of a foundation to help prevent further demolitions.

== See also ==
- List of National Historic Landmarks in Georgia (U.S. state)
- National Register of Historic Places listings in Georgia
