= Solomon House =

Solomon House may refer to:

in the United States

- Solomon Roadhouse, Solomon, Alaska, listed on the National Register of Historic Places (NRHP)
- Solomon-Curd House, Macon, Georgia, NRHP-listed in Bibb County
- Solomon-Smith-Martin House, Macon, Georgia, NRHP-listed in Bibb County
- Solomon House (Philadelphia, Pennsylvania), NRHP-listed

== See also ==
- Solomon's House, a fictional location in Sir Francis Bacon's Utopia
