= Charles Bowden (disambiguation) =

Charles Bowden (1945–2014) was an American non-fiction author, journalist, and essayist.

Charles Bowden may also refer to:

- Charles Bowden (cricketer) (1860–1909), New Zealand cricketer
- Charles Bowden (criminal), first person to enter Irelands's witness protection programme
- Charles Bowden (politician) (1886–1972), New Zealand politician
- Charles L. Bowden, mayor of Macon, Georgia from 1938 to 1947 and the namesake of the Charles L. Bowden Golf Course
- Charles Sanderson, Baron Sanderson of Bowden (born 1933), British Conservative Party politician and a life peer in the House of Lords
