= First Presbyterian Day School =

Private day school in Macon, Georgia USA

Location
- 5671 Calvin Drive; Macon, Georgia 31210; United States
- 32°52′21″N 83°45′00″W

Information
- School type: Independent college preparatory
- Religious affiliation: Presbyterian
- Established: 1970 (56 years ago)
- CEEB code: 111937
- Headmaster: John Patterson (starting 2020-2021 school year)
- Teaching staff: 78.9 (on an FTE basis)
- Grades: PK to 12
- Gender: Coeducational
- Enrollment: 961 (including 42 PK students) (2015-2016)
- Student to teacher ratio: 11.6
- Colors: Red, black, white
- Athletics: GHSA Class
- Nickname: Vikings
- Publication: The Edda (literary magazine)
- Newspaper: The SAGA
- Yearbook: Reflections
- Website: www.fpdmacon.org

First Presbyterian Day School (FPD) is a private, college-preparatory Christian day school in Macon, Georgia, United States. FPD was founded in 1970 by Macon's First Presbyterian Church and has been described at the time of its founding as a segregation academy.

== History ==
First Presbyterian Day School was founded in 1970. The First Presbyterian church founded the school the same year that a judge ordered Bibb County public schools to desegregate. The school has been tax-exempt since 1971 and maintains a policy of non-discrimination.

== Demographics ==
The demographic breakdown of the 919 K-12 students enrolled in 2015–2016 was:

- Asian - 1.7%
- Black - 6.1%
- Hispanic - 1.0%
- White - 90.4%
- Multiracial - 0.8%

NCES does not gather demographic data for the 42 Pre-K students.

== Athletics ==
Since the fall of 2010, FPD has competed in the Georgia High School Association. 2010 was its last year in the Georgia Independent School Association.

The Vikings and Lady Vikings compete in baseball, basketball, cheering, cross-country, dance, football, golf, lacrosse, marksmanship, soccer, softball, swimming, tennis, track and field, volleyball, wrestling, and gymnastics.

Since joining the GHSA in 2010, FPD has won numerous region and area championships as well as two state championships in girls' soccer and state championships in softball and clay target shooting.

== Academics ==
The elementary school was named a National Blue Ribbon School by the U.S. Department of Education in 2003, and the middle school was named a national Blue Ribbon School in 2012. The elementary school was again awarded the Blue Ribbon in 2015.

FPD is accredited by the Southern Association of Colleges and Schools.

== Notable alumni ==
- Robert McDuffie, Grammy-nominated violinist
- John Rocker, former major league baseball relief pitcher
