= First Presbyterian Church (Macon, Georgia) =

Historic church in Georgia, United States

- U.S. National Register of Historic Places
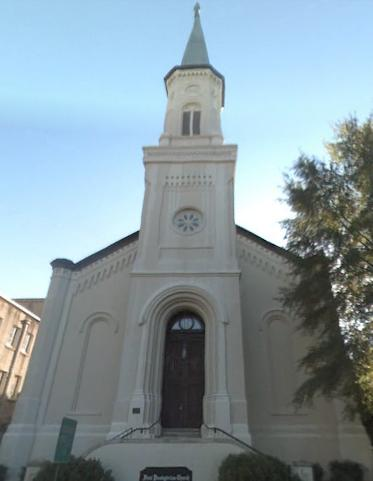
- First Presbyterian Church

- Location within Georgia Location within the United States
- Location: 690 Mulberry St., Macon, Georgia
- Coordinates: 32°50′17″N 83°37′47″W
- Area: less than one acre
- Built: 1858
- Architectural style: Romanesque
- NRHP reference No.: 72000364
- Added to NRHP: September 14, 1972

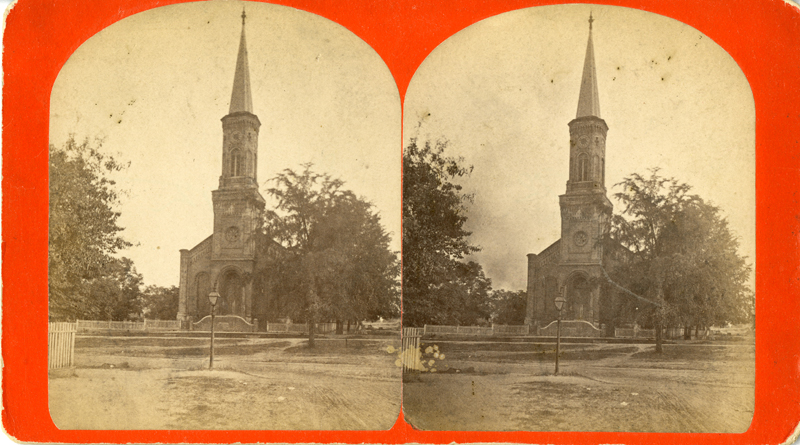
First Presbyterian Church, circa 1876.

First Presbyterian Church is a historic Presbyterian church in Macon, GA.

== History ==
The place was frequently visited by Mr. Joseph C. Stiles, a licentiate and Evangelist of Hopewell Presbytery, who took it in as a part of his field. As the fruit of his ministry a church was organized June 18, 1826, of twenty five members, by Rev. Benjamin Gildersleeve, First Presbyterian Church was born on June 18, 1826, just three years after the city of Macon was chartered. The church continued to be a part of the Evangelistic field of Mr. Stiles, till 1828, when Rev. James C. Patterson became the regular supply for two years till the Fall of 1830. During Mr. Patterson's ministry the first building, a wooden structure, was erected on Fourth street. This building was turned over to the Baptists, who removed and enlarged it; and is now the Second Baptist church. The Rev. Edwin Holt was the first regular pastor, installed November 20, 1831, and served the church from 1831 to 1834, when the relation was dissolved by the Presbytery of Good Hope and he dismissed to the Presbytery of Newburyport July 27, 1836. He was followed by Rev. James Stratton, as supply, for two years. He was never settled. His name was stricken from the roll March 29, 1843, he "having joined another church." He was succeeded by Rev. Samuel J. Cassels, who was installed November 5, 1836 and continued till April 13, 1842. It was during the ministry of Rev. Mr. Cassels, that the second house, a brick building commenced during the ministry of Mr. Stratton, was completed.

Since 1858, when the present structure was completed, its spire, soaring 183 feet above the street, has dominated the downtown section of Mulberry Street. It is the 6th tallest building in Macon, at 185 feet(56 m). It was the tallest building in Macon from its completion in 1858 until the completion of the St. Joseph's Catholic Church. It was listed on the National Register of Historic Places in 1972. It is located on 690 Mulberry Street, in Downtown Macon. The famous poet Sidney Lanier was a member here.

Today, the congregation has more than 1000 members.

== School ==
In 1970, the church founded First Presbyterian Day School. The church founded the school the same year that a judge ordered Bibb County public schools to desegregate. The campus was located in a mostly white suburban area, some distance away from the church's headquarters in a black neighborhood downtown. These factors have led the historian Andrew Manis to conclude that the school was a segregation academy established to allow white parents to avoid sending their children to racially integrated public schools.

The First Presbyterian Church, as seen in this picture of Macon from the early 1900s towards the left of the photo, was currently the tallest building in Macon.

First Presbyterian Church is a member congregation of the Presbyterian Church in America.
