= Solomon-Smith-Martin House =

Historic house in Georgia, United States

- U.S. National Register of Historic Places
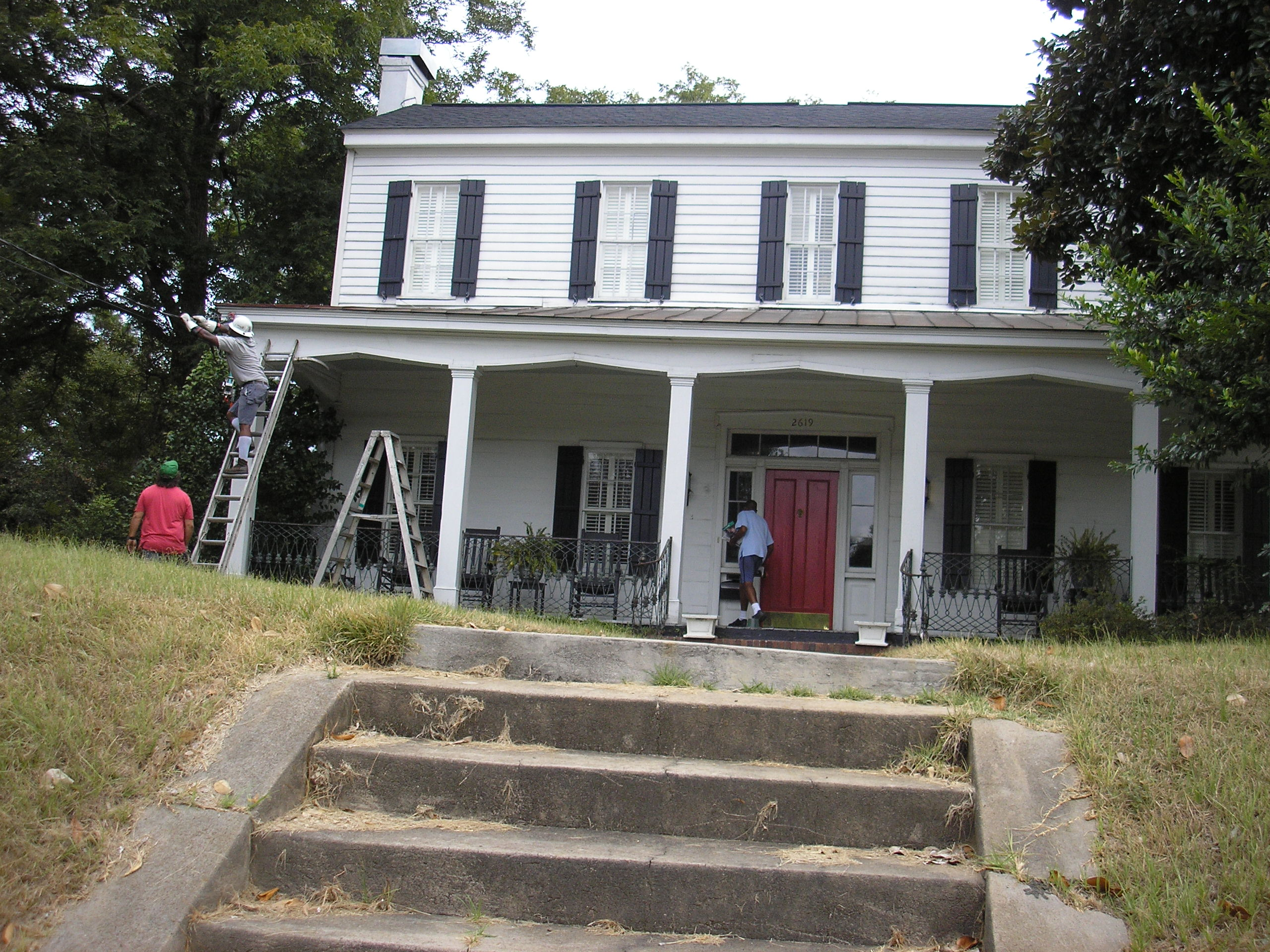

- Location within Georgia
- Location: 2619 Vineville Ave., Macon, Georgia
- Coordinates: 32.84626°N 83.66317°W
- Area: less than one acre
- Built: c. 1823
- Built by: Solomon, Henry
- Architectural style: Early Republic
- NRHP reference No.: 71000268
- Added to NRHP: July 14, 1971

The Solomon-Smith-Martin House in Macon, Georgia, built in c. 1823 as a farm owner's home, is one of the oldest houses in Macon. It was added to the National Register of Historic Places on July 14, 1971. It is located at 2619 Vineville Avenue.

It is constructed of hand-sawn boards, hand-made bricks, and pegs rather than nails.

== See also ==
- National Register of Historic Places listings in Bibb County, Georgia
