= Bowden Golf Course =

Golf course in Macon, Georgia, United States

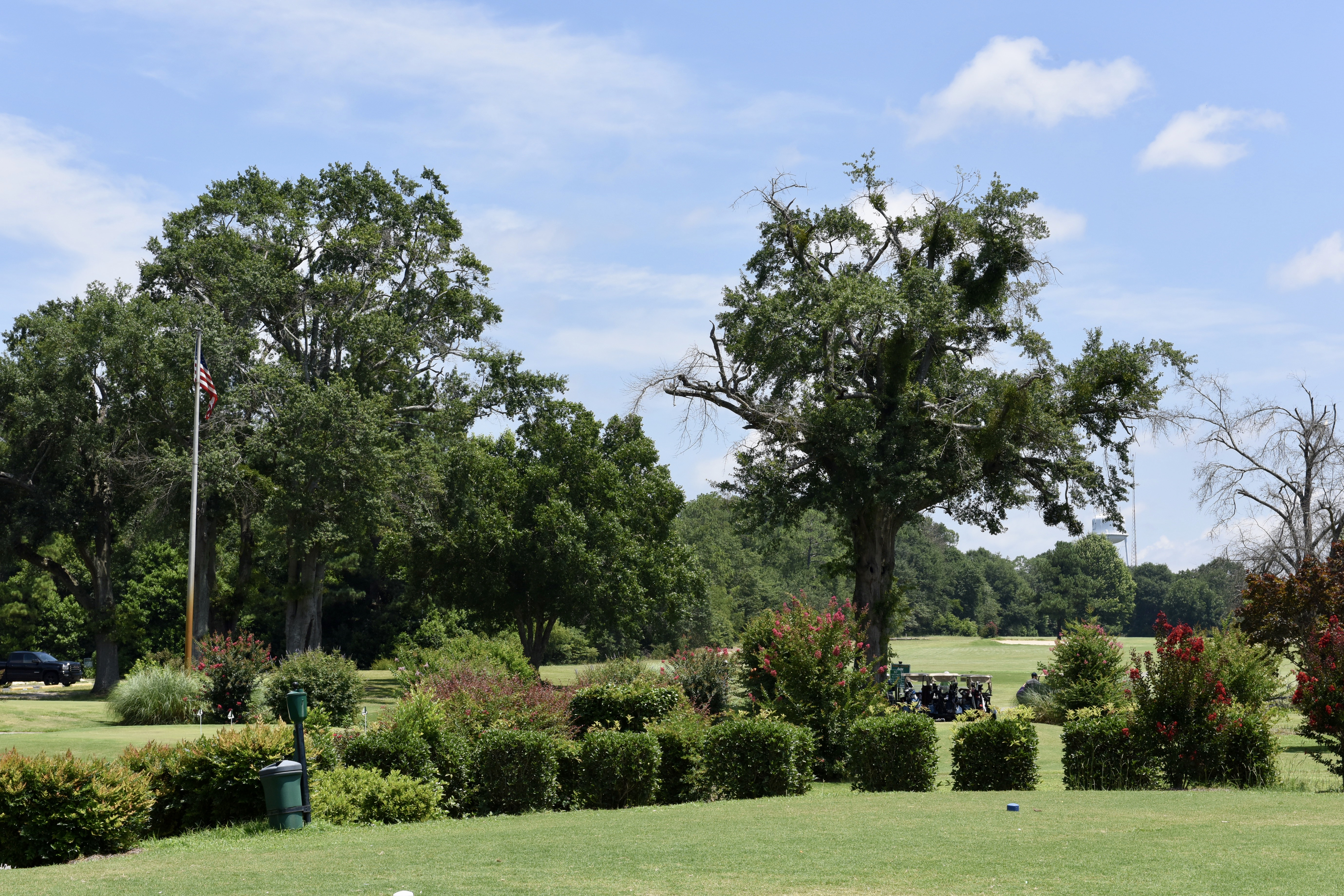
- First hole of the course
- Interactive map of Bowden Golf Course
- 32°51′48″N 83°34′9″W

Club information
- Location: 3111 Millerfield Road, Macon, Georgia, USA
- Established: September 1940
- Type: Public
- Owner: Macon-Bibb
- Total holes: 18
- Greens: Bermuda grass
- Website: BowdenGolfCourse.com
- Designed by: John C. Cotton
- Charles L. Bowden Golf Course (Note: Charles L. Bowden was mayor of Macon from 1938 to 1947.)
- U.S. National Register of Historic Places
- NRHP reference No.: 15000024
- Added to NRHP: February 23, 2015

Bowden Golf Course, known formally as Charles L. Bowden Golf Course, is a golf course located in Macon, Georgia.

== History ==
The course was designed in 1938 by John C. Cotton, a Macon professional golfer, and built by labor supplied by the Works Progress Administration on the site of a former airfield in east Macon, known as Miller Field. Most of the growth in golf courses between 1933 and 1942 came from New Deal initiatives, changing the face of golf in the United States. By early 1937, more than $12 million of work at about 368 courses had been completed throughout the country. Macon was able to take advantage of this program, securing $55,000 of the $70,000 needed to develop the course. The local Junior Chamber of Commerce raised much of the rest through contributions and the sale of memberships.

The course was completed in September 1940. The property consisted of approximately 229 acres with an 18-hole course, a driving range and a putting green. Several cobblestone benches that were installed when the course was built are still present at some tees. New structures, including a replacement clubhouse, a golf cart shed, and maintenance buildings, were built in the 1970s and are not historically significant. Holes 1 and 10 are at the site of the former Miller Field.

In 1961, Bowden Golf Course became the first public facility in Macon to become racially integrated. In March 2015 the course was added to the National Register of Historic Places.
