= Emerson–Holmes Building =

- U.S. National Register of Historic Places
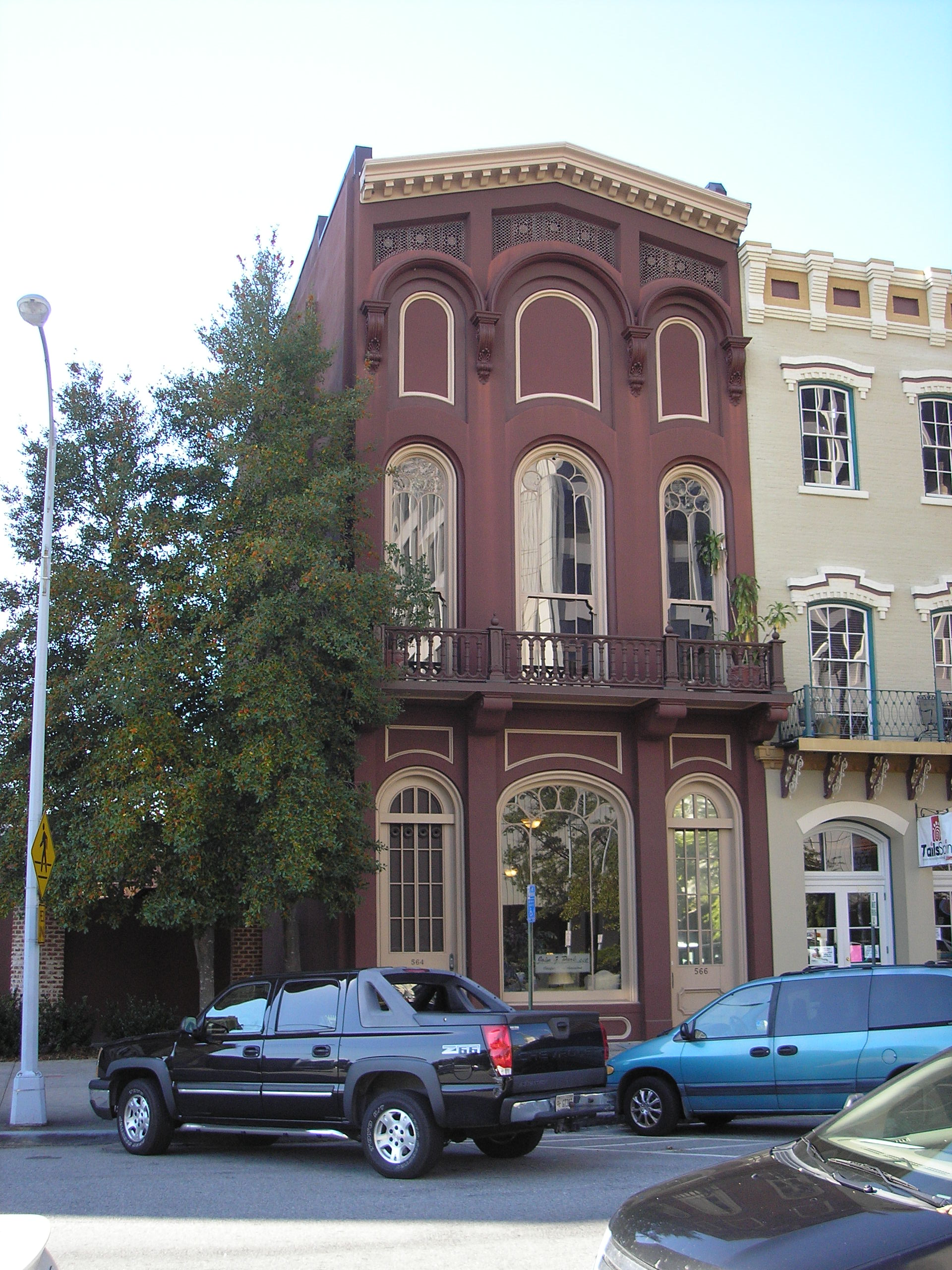

- Location within Georgia
- Location: 566 Mulberry St., Macon, Georgia
- Coordinates: 32°50′13″N 83°37′39″W
- Area: 1 acre (0.40 ha)
- Built: 1859
- Built by: James B. Ayres
- Architectural style: Italianate
- NRHP reference No.: 71000254
- Added to NRHP: June 21, 1971

The Emerson–Holmes Building is a historic building at 566 Mulberry Street in Macon, Georgia that was built in 1859. It was added to the National Register of Historic Places in 1971.

It is narrow—just 23 feet (7.0 m)—and was built to serve as dentist offices for Dr. George W. Emerson, a dentist from Hew Hampshire. It has a "distinctive" facade and interior designed by master builder James B. Ayres and possibly built by artisans from Italy who had been brought to build the P.L. Hay House. The building was used for 82 years as dentist offices by Dr. Emerson and successors. The building also has residential space on the third floor.

Another NRHP listed building, the Militia Headquarters Building, was immediately adjacent to this building, but has since been demolished.

== Photos ==
The building was surveyed by the Historic American Buildings Survey program, the photos were taken by L.D. Andrew on August 2, 1936.

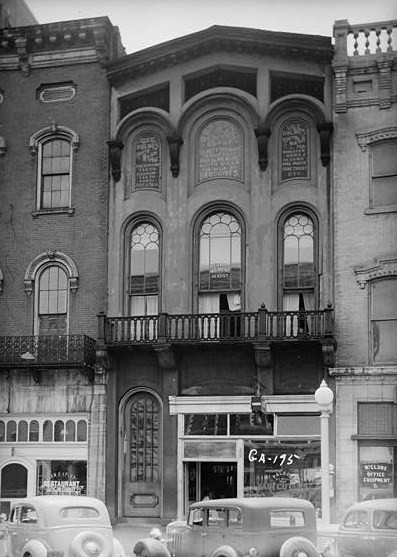
Front elevation

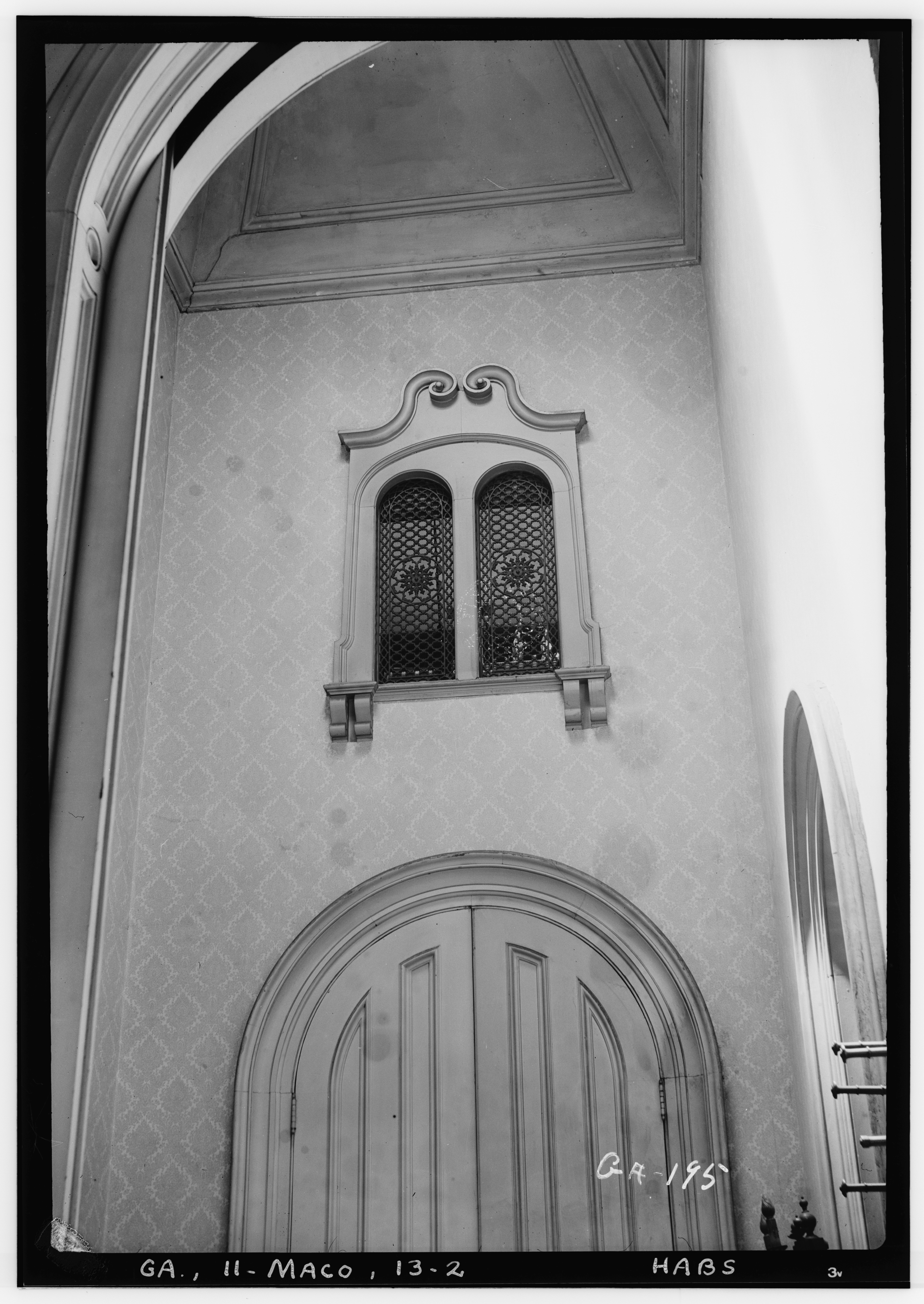
Upper part of stair hall

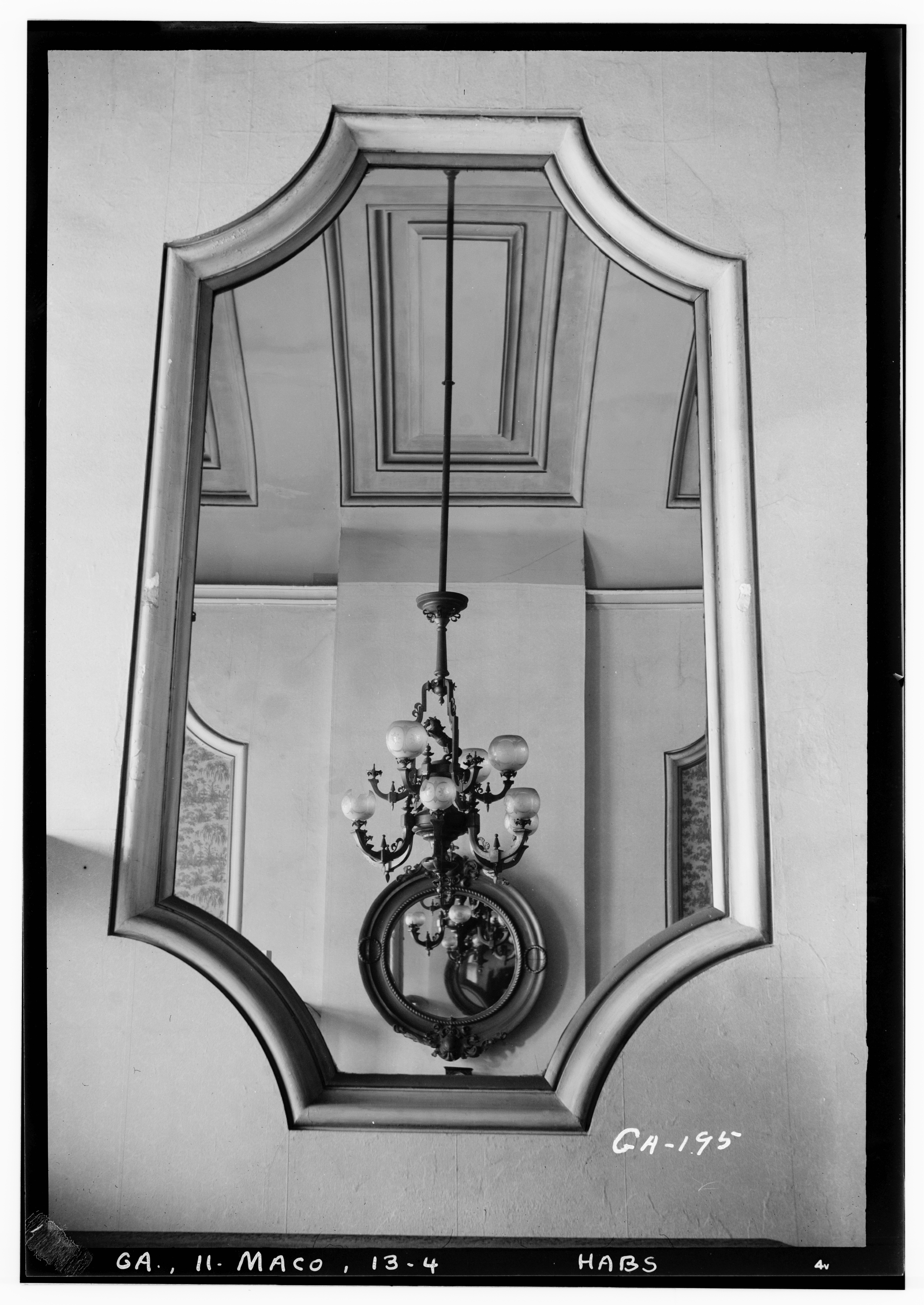
Mirror in drawing room on the second floor

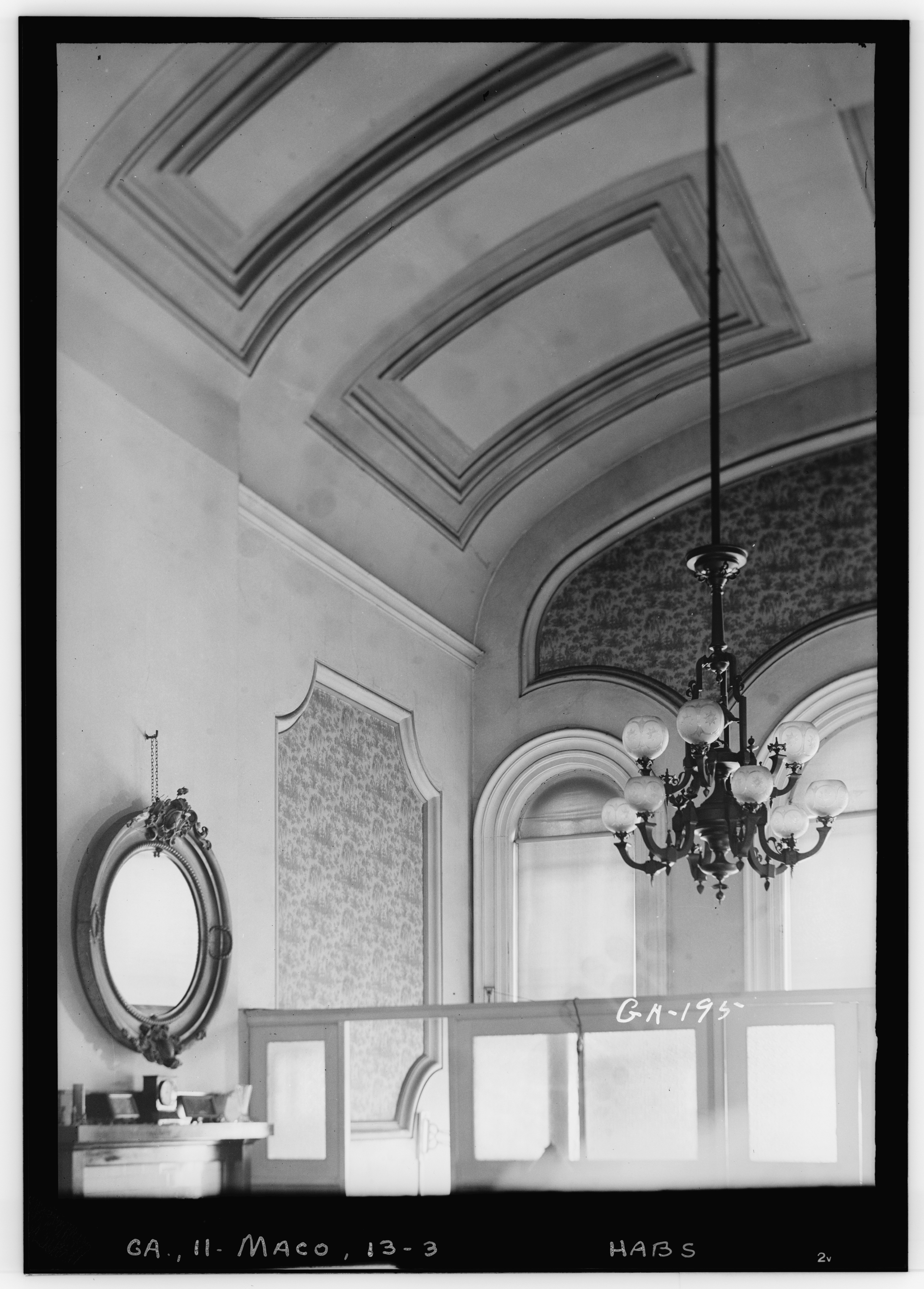
Panels and vaulted ceiling in drawing room, second floor

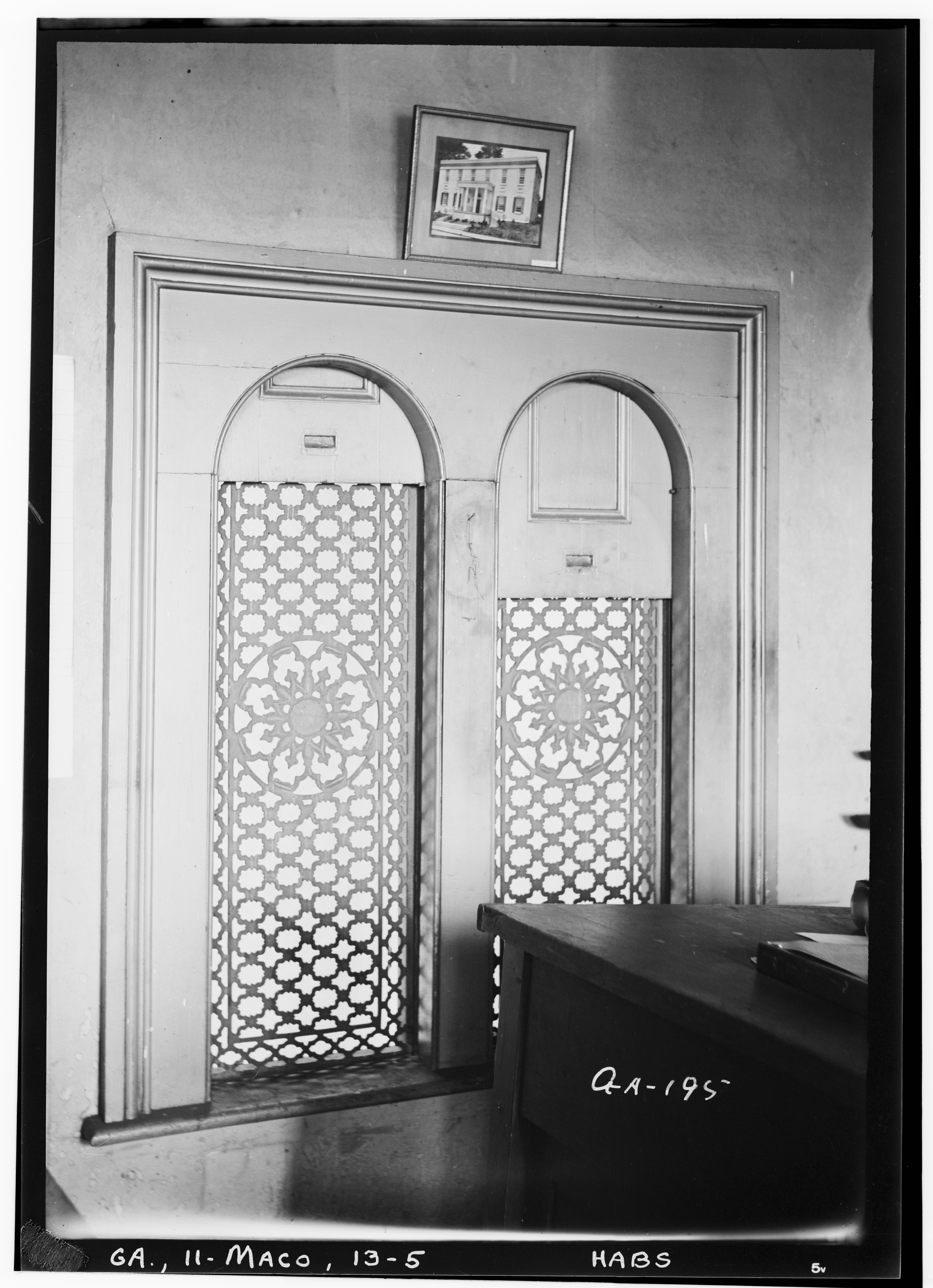
Detail of double opening with iron grating in third story rear room

== See also ==
- National Register of Historic Places listings in Bibb County, Georgia
