= Downtown Macon, Georgia =

Central business district of Macon, Georgia, United States

Downtown Macon
- District
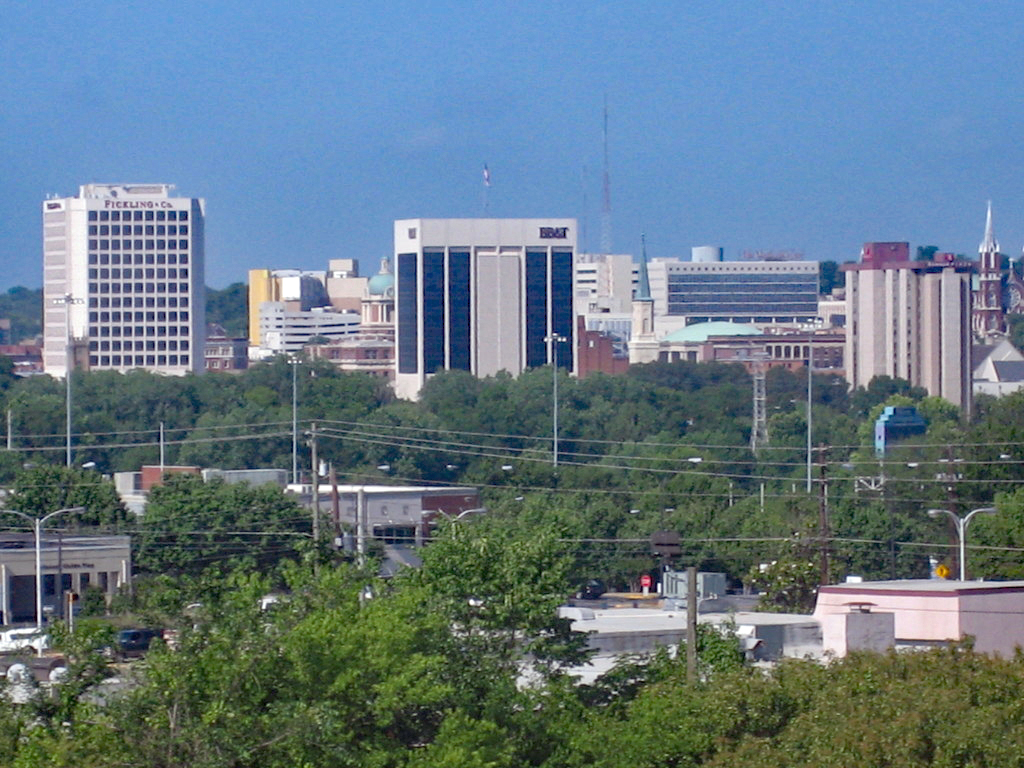
- Downtown Macon from north.
- Interactive map of Downtown Macon
- Coordinates: 32°50′22.92″N 83°37′51.6″W
- Country: United States
- State: Georgia
- City: Macon
- Elevation: 381 ft (116 m)
- Time zone: UTC-5 (EST)
  - Summer (DST): UTC-4 (EDT)
- ZIP Code: 31201
- Area code: 478

Downtown Macon refers to the largest financial district in the city of Macon, Georgia, United States. It is home to many museums, ranging from the Georgia Sports Hall of Fame to the Tubman African American Museum. Numerous Antebellum homes are located in Downtown Macon, including the Woodruff House, the Hay House, and the Cannonball House. One of the most notable churches in downtown Macon is Mulberry Street United Methodist Church, the oldest Methodist Church in the state of Georgia. Terminal Station, was built in 1916.

== Overview ==
=== Buildings ===
Some notable buildings in Downtown Macon are:

- Terminal Station
- Ramada Plaza
- BB&T Building
- Fickling & Company Building
- St. Paul Towers
- Saint Joseph's Catholic Church
- Dempsey Apartments
- Ashley Towers
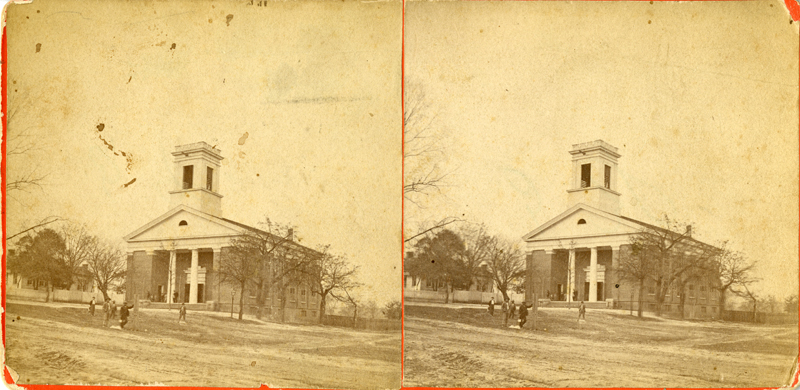
- Mulberry Street Methodist Church, c. 1876.
  Gateway Plaza
- Georgia Federal Building
- Southern Federal Building
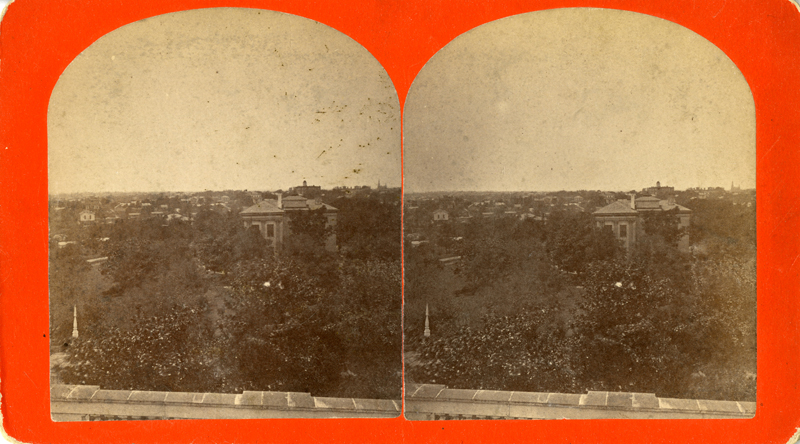
- View of Downtown Macon from Coleman Hill, 1877
  Medical Center of Central Georgia
- Mercer University Walter F. George School of Law

=== Tourism ===
The biggest tourist attraction in downtown Macon is the annual Cherry Blossom Festival, but there are also many other smaller attractions, such as the many museums (mentioned above), and also small parades for holidays such as Thanksgiving and Christmas.

== Gallery ==
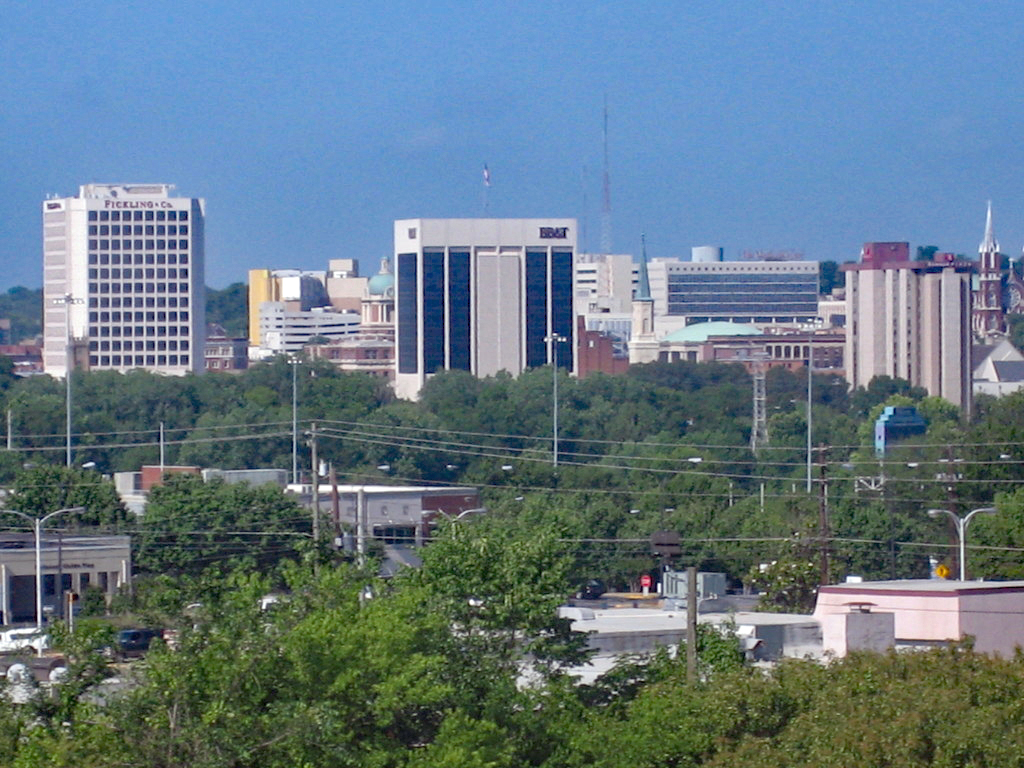
Downtown Macon from north.

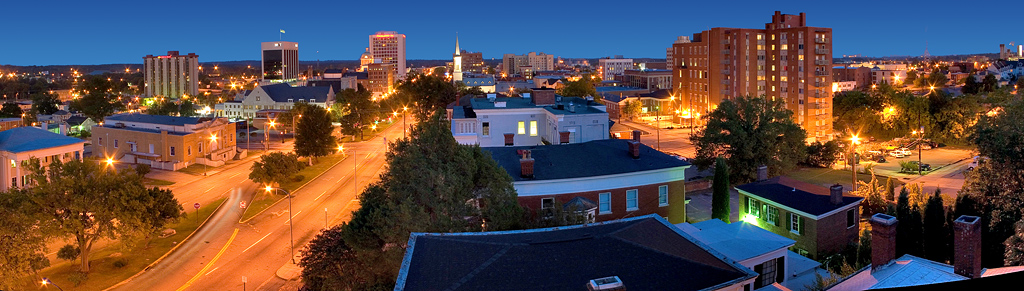
Downtown Macon from east.

=== Buildings ===
Ramada Plaza

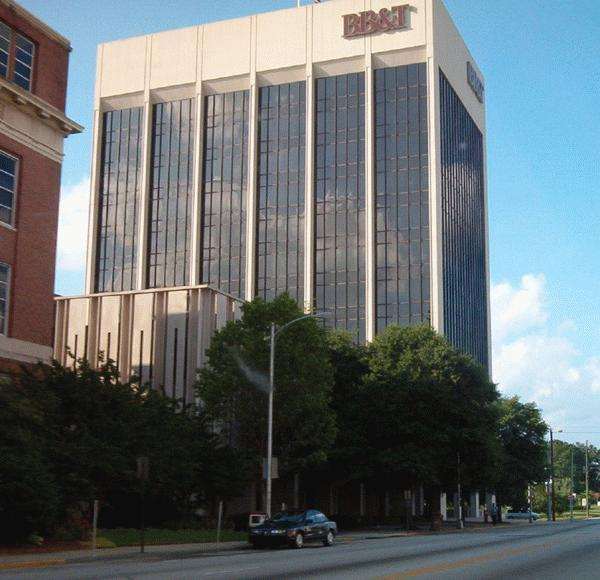
BB&T Building

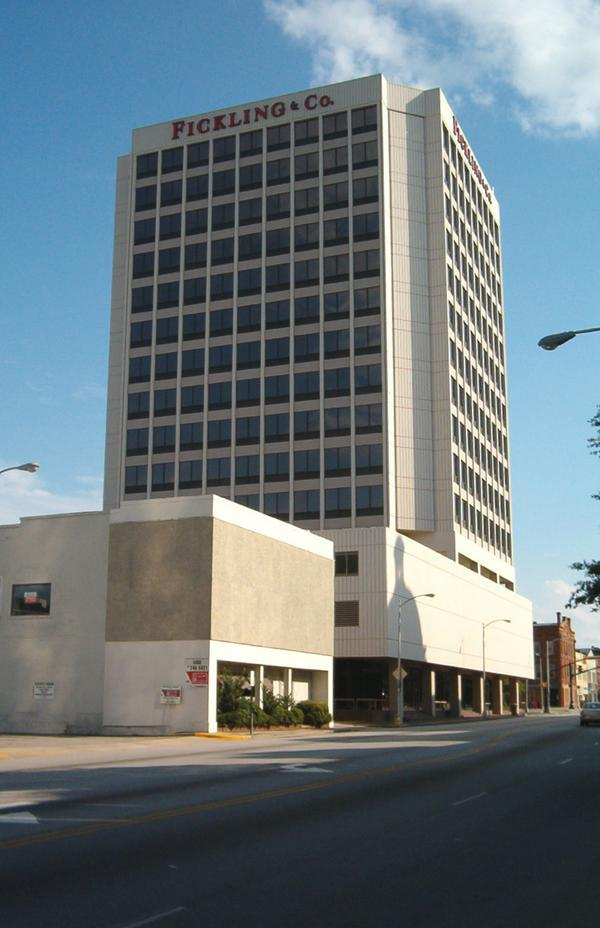
Fickling & co. Building

St. Paul Towers

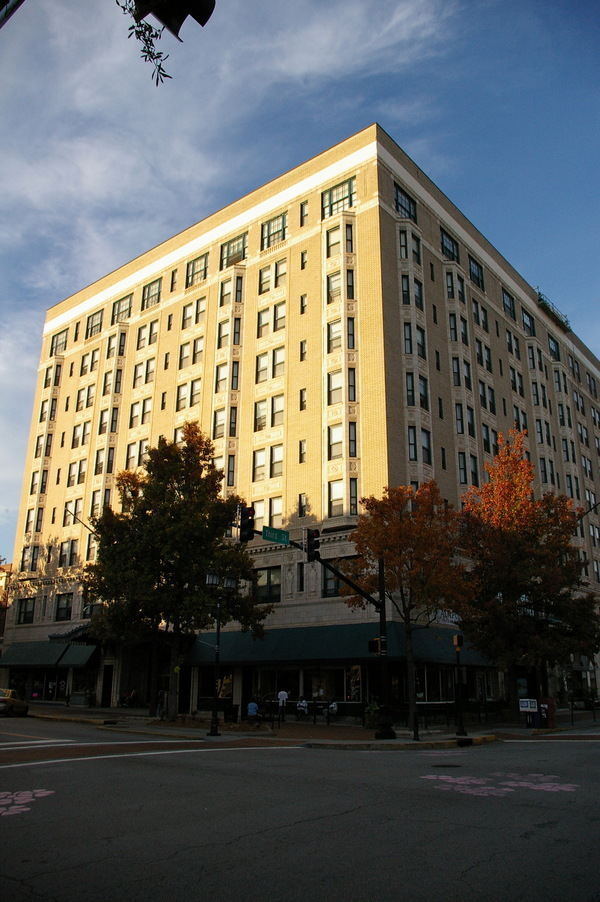
Dempsey Apartments

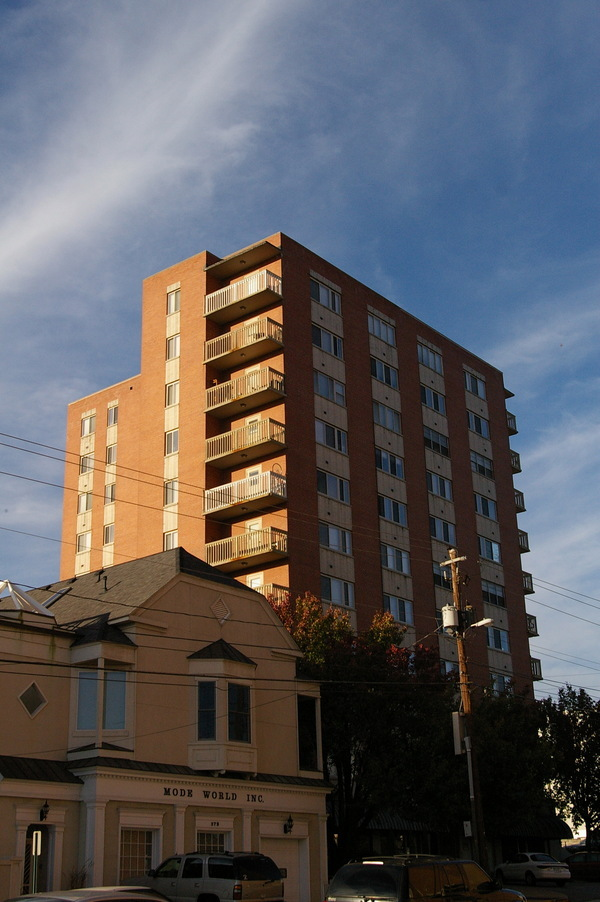
Ashley Towers

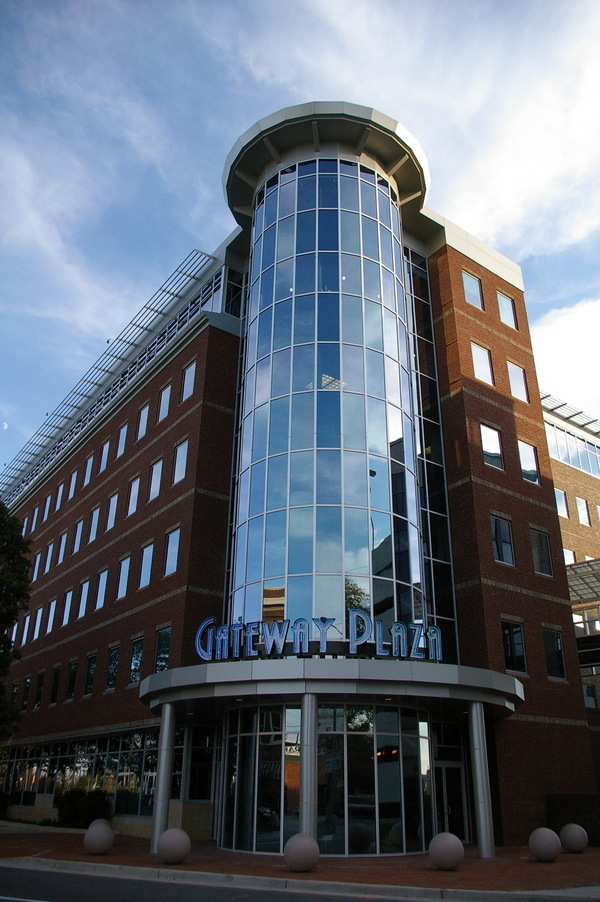
Gateway Plaza

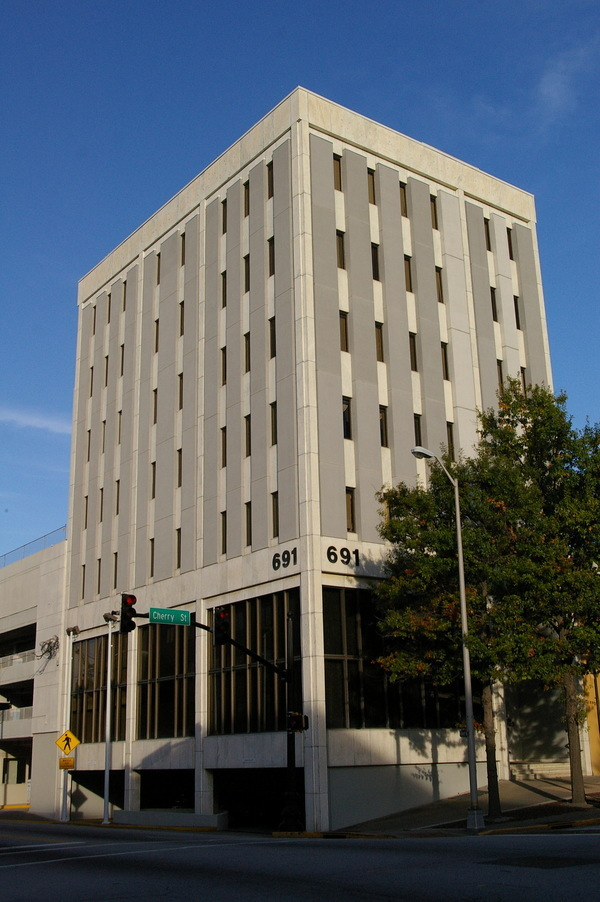
Georgia Federal Building

Southern United Building

Macon City Hall

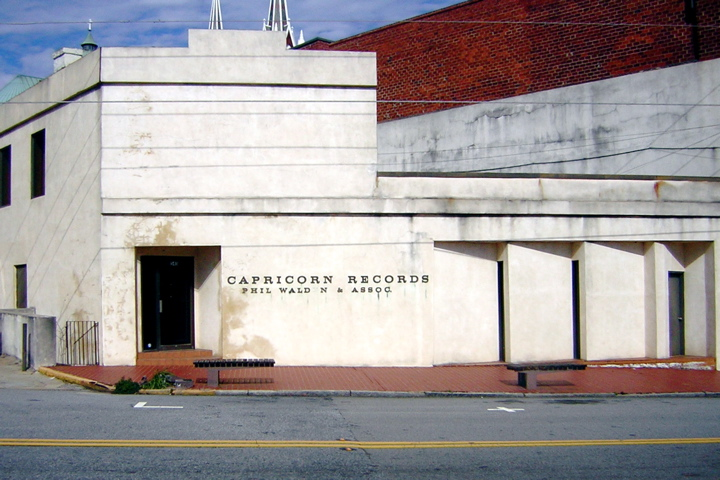
Capricorn Records

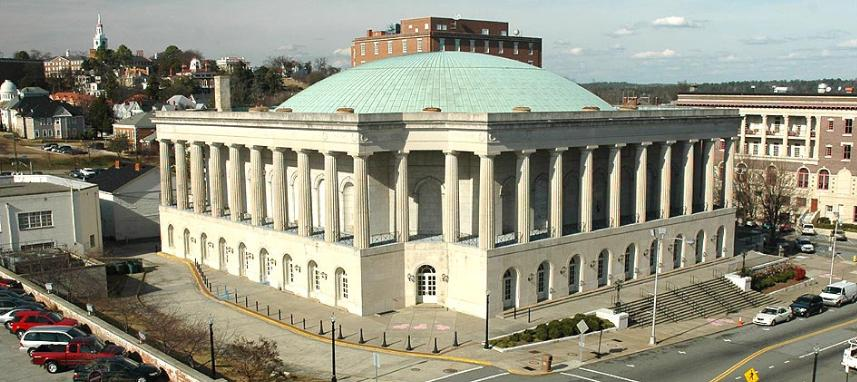
Macon Auditorium

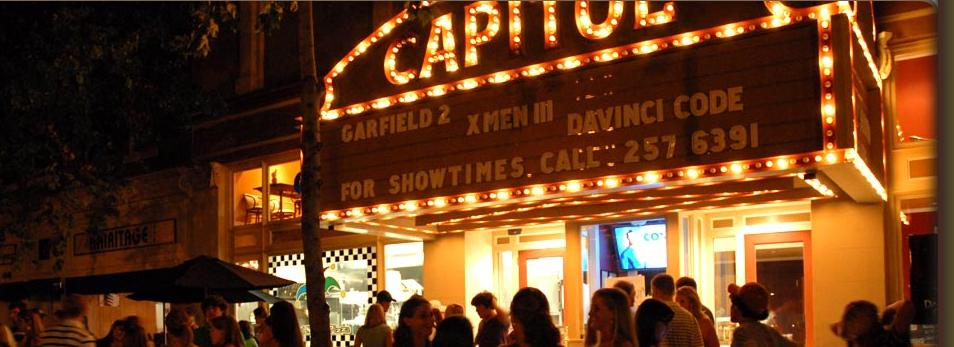
Cox Capitol Theater

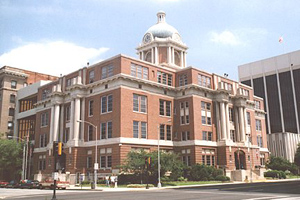
Macon-Bibb County Courthouse

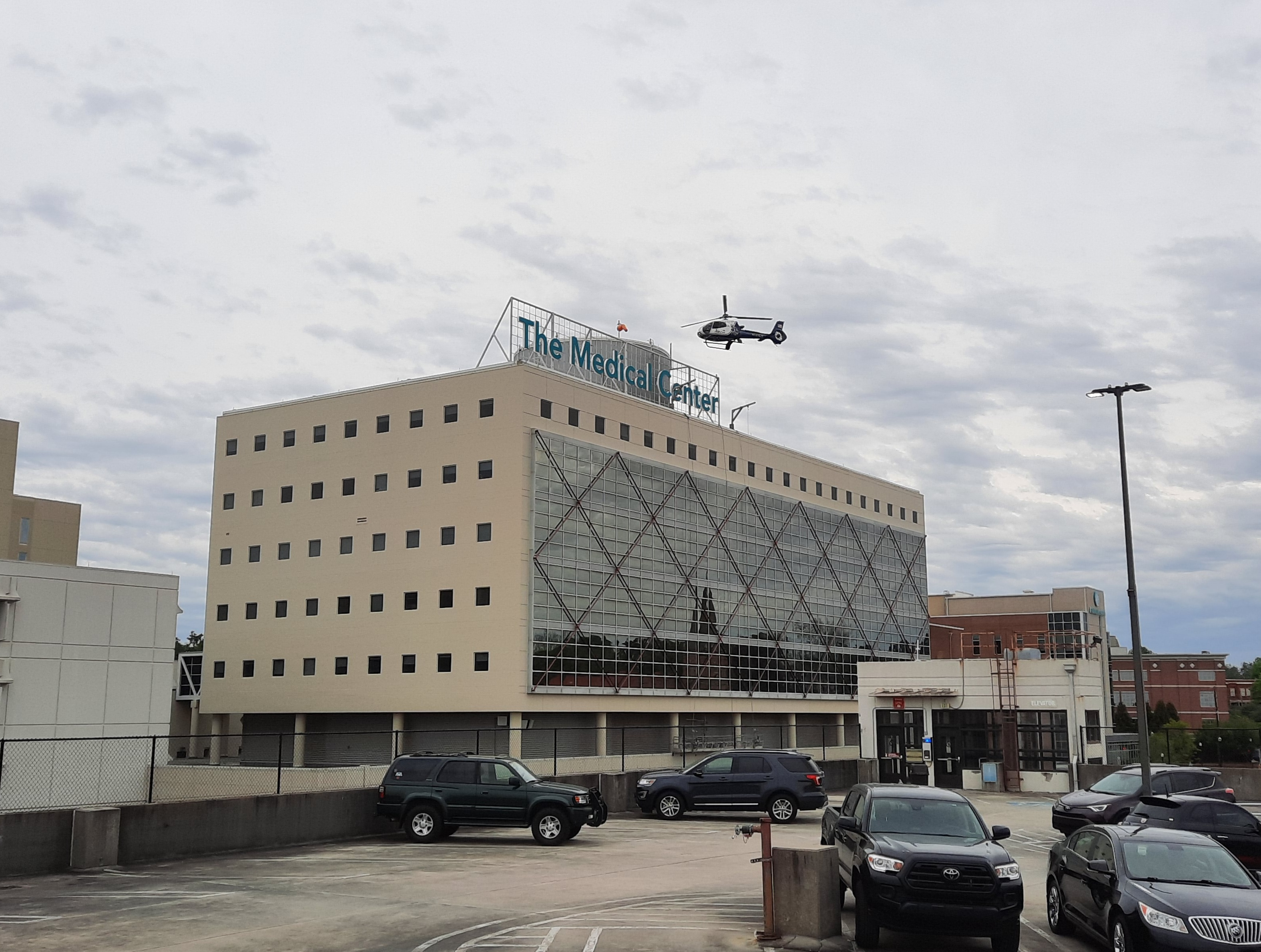
The Medical Center, Navicent Health
