= Militia Headquarters Building =

- U.S. National Register of Historic Places
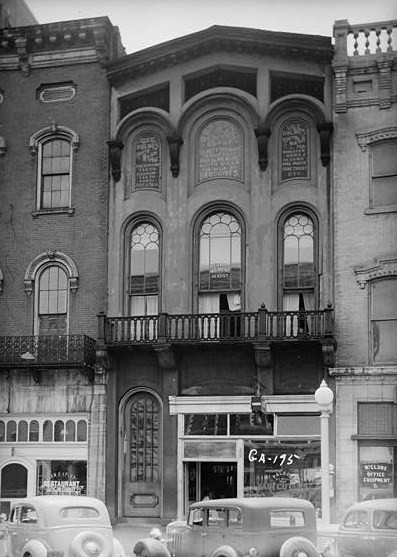
- Seen at the left side of this 1936 photo of the Emerson–Holmes Building.

- Location within Georgia Location within the United States
- Location: 552--564 Mulberry St., Macon, Georgia
- Coordinates: 32°50′14″N 83°37′39″W
- Area: 1 acre (0.40 ha)
- Built: 1857
- Architect: Bostick & Kein
- Architectural style: Italianate
- NRHP reference No.: 72000367
- Added to NRHP: April 11, 1972

Militia Headquarters Building was a historic site in Macon, Georgia at 552-564 Mulberry Street. It was added to the National Register of Historic Places on April 11, 1972. The building was also used for the American Office Equipment Company. The building was designed in an Italianate architecture style by Bostick & Kein. It is not known when the building was demolished.

The militia was active during the American Civil War era.

== See also ==
- National Register of Historic Places listings in Bibb County, Georgia
- Fort Hawkins (Macon, Georgia) Militia headquarters during the War of 1812

== See also ==
- Historic image of block
