= Hatcher-Groover-Schwartz House =

Historic house in Georgia, United States

- U.S. National Register of Historic Places
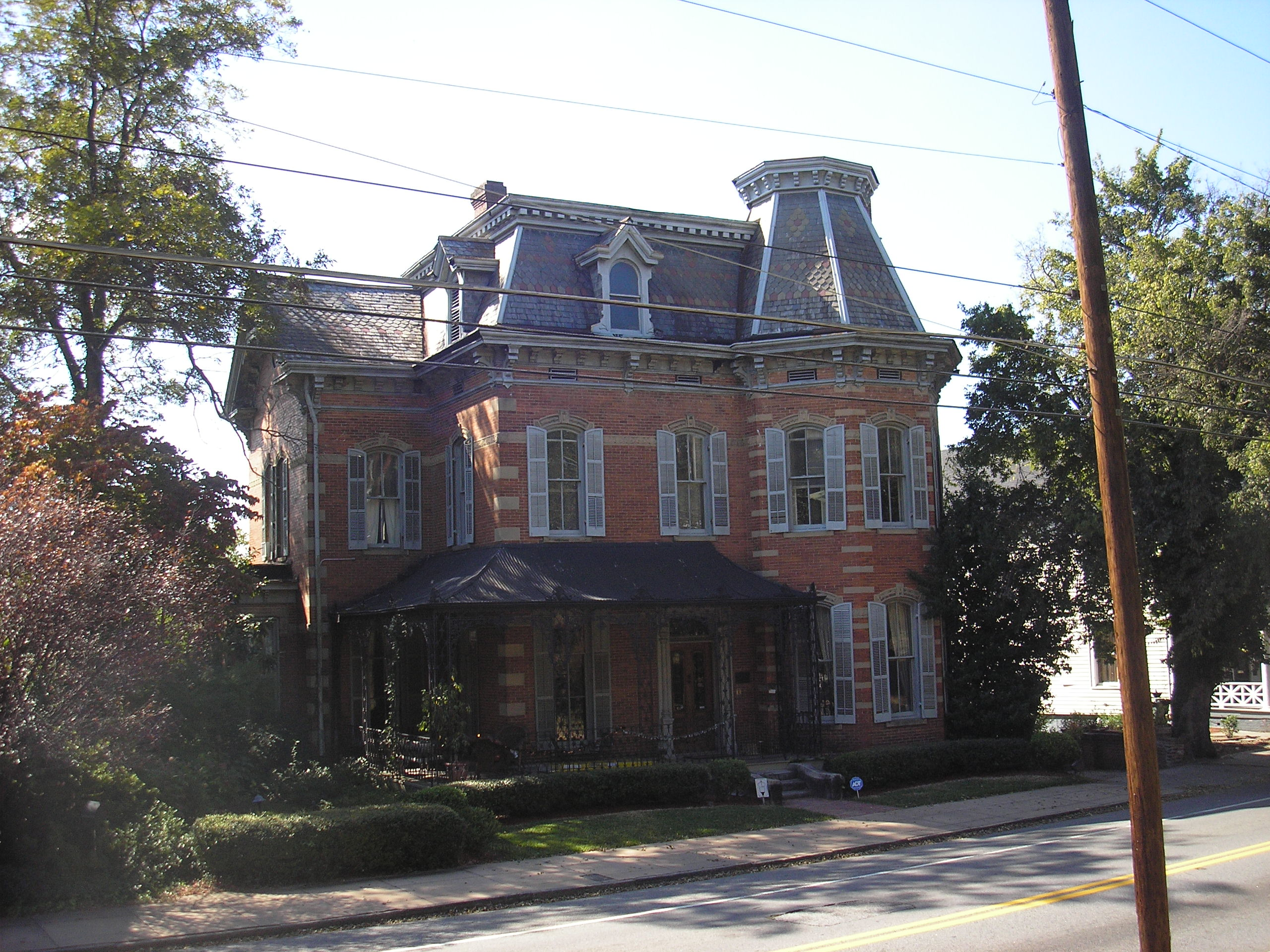

- Location within Georgia
- Location: 1144--1146 Georgia Ave., Macon, Georgia
- Coordinates: 32.84070°N 83.63748°W
- Area: less than one acre
- Built: 1880
- Architectural style: Second Empire
- NRHP reference No.: 71000257
- Added to NRHP: June 21, 1971

The Hatcher-Groover-Schwartz House is a historic residence in Macon, Georgia, that was built in 1880. It was listed on the National Register of Historic Places in 1971. It is located at 1144-1146 on Georgia Avenue, in the historic center of Macon.

It was deemed a "superb example" of Second Empire architecture, and the only example in Macon.

The house was built by Marshall James Hatcher in 1880. In 1935, it was sold by the descendants of Hatcher to Denmark Groover and his wife, who sold it in their turn in 1967 to Bert Schwartz and his wife.

== See also ==
- National Register of Historic Places listings in Bibb County, Georgia
