= Holt–Peeler–Snow House =

Historic house in Georgia, United States

- U.S. National Register of Historic Places
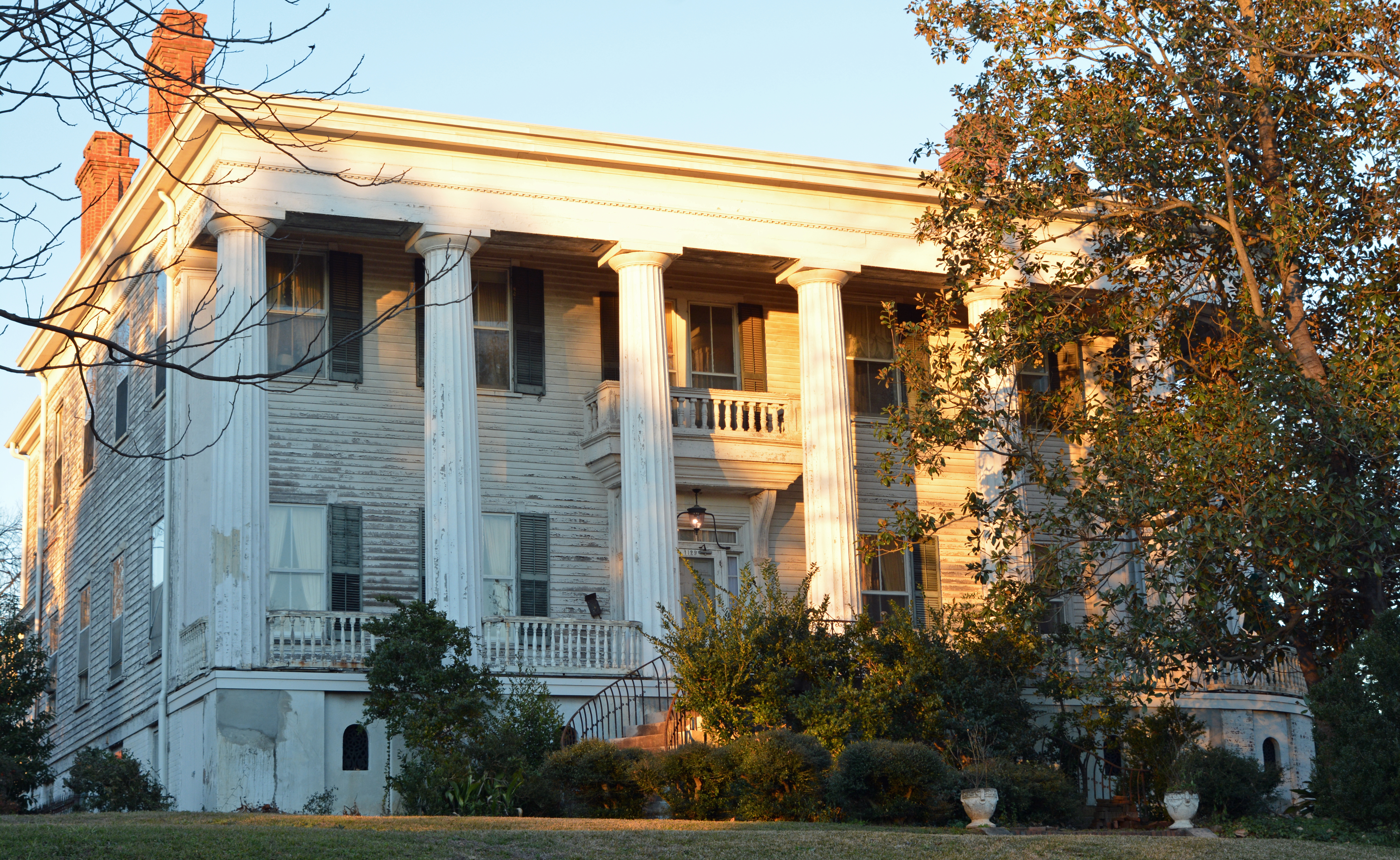

- Location within Georgia
- Location: 1129 Georgia Ave., Macon, Georgia
- Coordinates: 32.84120°N 83.63710°W
- Area: 1 acre (0.40 ha)
- Built: c. 1840
- Architect: Alexander, Elam
- Architectural style: Greek Revival
- NRHP reference No.: 71000258
- Added to NRHP: June 21, 1971

The Thaddeus Goode Holt Peeler House, also known as the Holt–Peeler–Snow House, is a historic residence in Macon, Georgia, located at 1129 Georgia Avenue. It was listed on the National Register of Historic Places on June 21, 1971.

The three-story house is an "exceptional example of Greek Revival architecture". It is one of few "old residences in the state having the horseshoe entrance steps with wrought iron railings." It was built about 1840 for Judge Thaddeus Goode Holt, following a design by Elam Alexander. It was his home and later home of Thaddeus Goode Holt Jr., a Confederate officer.

Architecture-wise, it has a raised main floor and a portico with Doric columns. It was "originally prostyle with six fluted wood columns, continuous guttae on the architrave, applied wreaths on the frieze, and a sloping wood parapet or coaming with acroteria; later changes added well-matched columns of formed sheet metal on the East or Orange Street side and a rounded corner entablature, graceful in itself but not compatible with the symmetrical parapet which was removed, as were the frieze wreaths which may have posed as well a problem of aesthetic spacing."

== See also ==
- National Register of Historic Places listings in Bibb County, Georgia
