= Munroe–Dunlap–Snow House =

Historic house in Georgia, United States

- Munroe-Dunlap-Snow House
- U.S. National Register of Historic Places
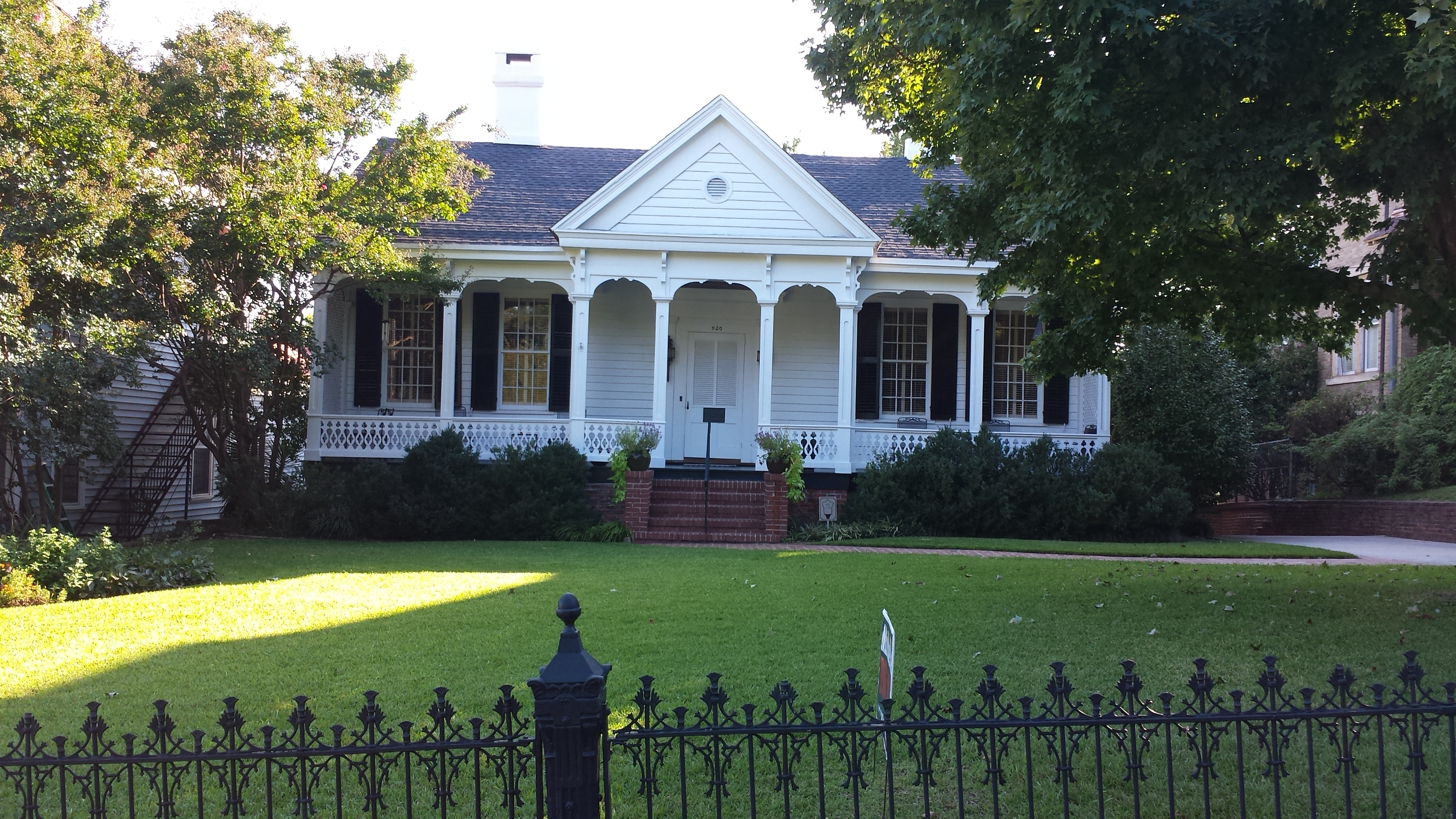

- Location within Georgia Location within the United States
- Location: 920 High St., Macon, Georgia
- Coordinates: 32.83678°N 83.63647°W
- Area: less than one acre
- Built: 1857
- NRHP reference No.: 71000263
- Added to NRHP: July 14, 1971

The Munroe–Dunlap–Snow House in Macon, Georgia is a small house that was built in about 1857. It appears originally to have been a five-room Victorian cottage. It is listed on the National Register of Historic Places individually as well as by serving as a contributing building in the Macon Historic District.

It was built for Nathaniel Campbell Munroe who was prominent in Macon in various ways: as secretary of the Board of Health and of the Macon Lyceum and Library Society, as a director of the Macon and Western Railroad and of the Macon Manufacturing Company, as a warden of Christ Church, as "a great contributor to the cause of the Confederacy". He owned the house until 1862.

A later owner was Captain Samuel S. Dunlap, leader of the Bibb County Cavalry. Peter J. Bracken, engineer of The Texas in the Great Locomotive Chase died in the house.
