= Carmichael House (Macon, Georgia) =

- U.S. National Register of Historic Places
- U.S. National Historic Landmark
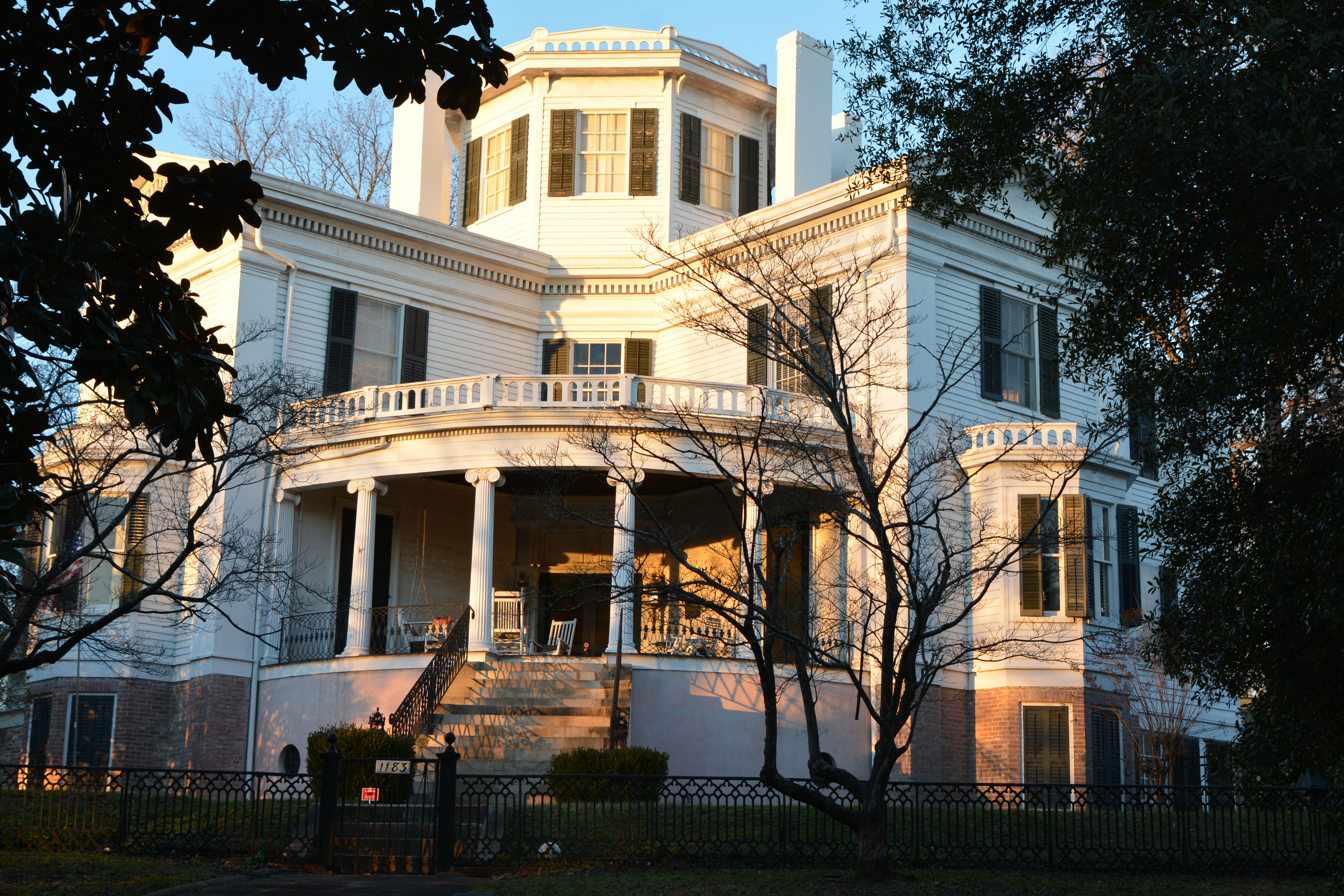
- 2016 photograph of the Carmichael House

- Location within Georgia Location within the United States
- Location: 1183 Georgia Ave., Macon, Georgia
- Coordinates: 32.84130°N 83.63765°W
- Built: 1848
- Architectural style: Greek Revival
- NRHP reference No.: 71000265

Significant dates
- Added to NRHP: June 21, 1971
- Designated NHL: November 7, 1973

The Carmichael House, known also as Raines-Carmichael House, Raines-Miller-Carmichael House or Cadwalader Raines House, is a Greek Revival mansion at 1183 Georgia Avenue in Macon, Georgia, United States. Built in 1848, the house is a nationally significant example of Greek Revival architecture, built and designed by local master builder Elam Alexander. It was declared a National Historic Landmark in 1973.

== Description and history ==
The Carmichael House is located in central Macon, at the northeast corner of Georgia Avenue and College Street. It is a two-story wood frame structure, laid out in the form of a Greek cross, with Ionic-columned porches between the arms of the cross, and a large octagonal cupola rising above the center. The corners of the cross arms have broad pilasters, rising to a full entablature and a dentillated cornice, with fully pedimented gable ends. The central feature of the interior is a free-standing spiral staircase that rises all the way to the cupola, and several of the first-floor public chambers have columned niches.

The house was built in the late 1840s for Cadawalader Raines, a local judge, by Elam Alexander, one of Macon's most important master builders of the period. The house is one of Alexander's most elaborate works, and is now among the best-preserved of his surviving works. The house was described in Howard Major's Domestic Architecture of the Early American Republic as a striking and detailed example of Greek Revival architecture. Cadwalader Raines died childless in 1856, and the house soon passed out of the family; it was owned in the 20th century by the Carmichaels.

== See also ==
- List of National Historic Landmarks in Georgia (U.S. state)
- National Register of Historic Places listings in Bibb County, Georgia
