= Saint Joseph's Catholic Church (Macon, Georgia) =

Historic church in Georgia, United States

- Saint Joseph Catholic Church
- U.S. National Register of Historic Places
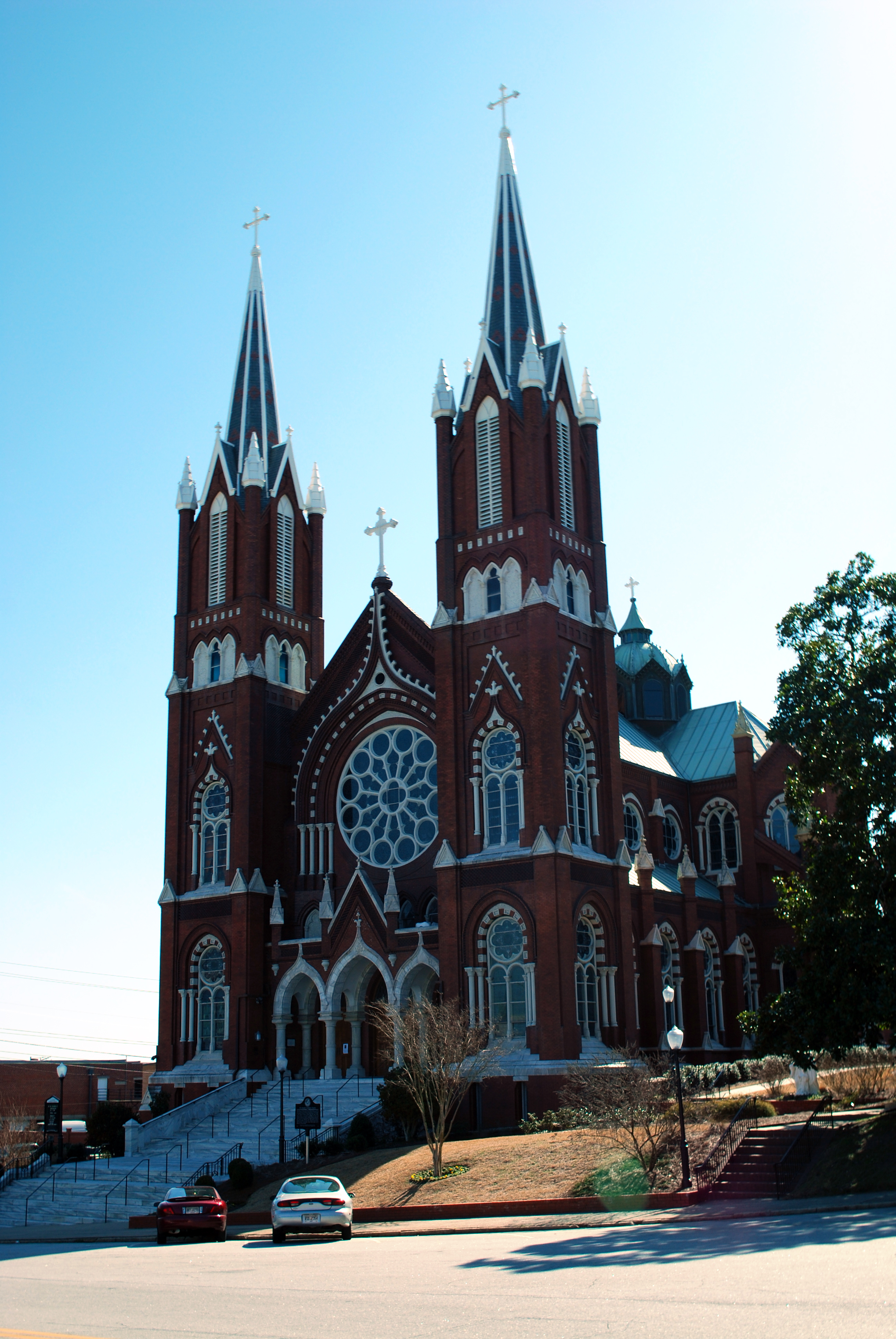

- Location within Georgia Location within the United States
- Location: 812 Poplar St., Macon, Georgia
- Coordinates: 32°50′12″N 83°38′1″W
- Area: less than one acre
- Built: 1889, 1892
- Architect: Nicholas J. Clayton; Cornelius S.J. Otten
- Architectural style: Gothic, Romanesque
- MPS
- NRHP reference No.: 71000269
- Added to NRHP: July 14, 1971

Saint Joseph Catholic Church , located at 812 Poplar Street in Macon, Georgia, was listed on the NRHP on July 14, 1971. The church is located in the middle of Downtown Macon and takes up one block. It is operated by the Roman Catholic Diocese of Savannah.

The towers are the tallest twin towers in Macon, and the 3rd tallest building in Macon, at 200 feet (61 meters) to the tip. The interior features 60 stained glass windows which teach the story of Salvation, a white Carrara marble altar and pulpit, and an organ with 1,000 pipes.

== History ==
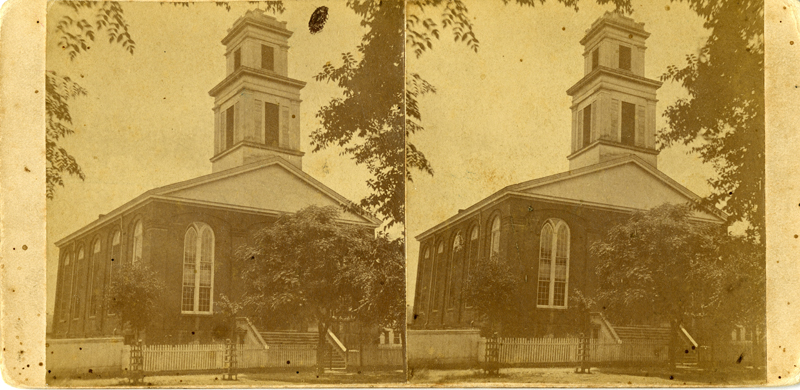
Saint Joseph's Roman Catholic Church, 4th Street, circa 1876

The Neo-Gothic church was the realization of an earlier dream of 50 Catholic parishioners and their first priest, Father James Graham. In 1841, this small group of Catholics had bought a Presbyterian church and started the first catholic parish in Macon, a town incorporated as a city only seventeen years earlier. There were twelve pastors after Farther Graham before another church was acquired. Father James O'Neill, the pastor in 1865, found that the church was too small for his growing congregation and purchased another Presbyterian church, this time on Fourth Street between Walnut and Ocmulgee (now Riverside Drive).

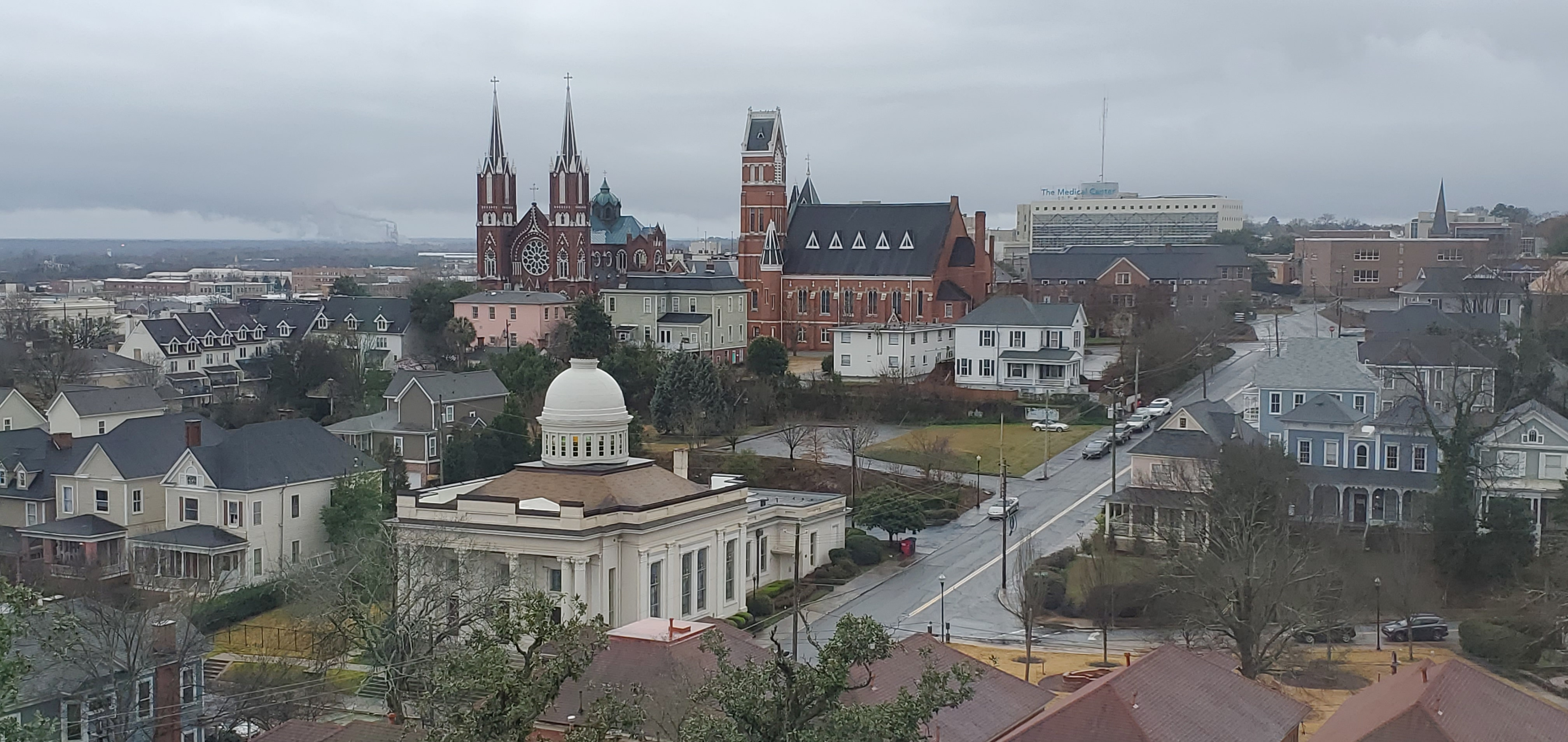
St. Joseph's as viewed from the Hay House cupola in February 2020

The Bishop of Savannah sent pastors to St. Joseph's Church until 1887, when he asked Jesuits to come from New Orleans to Macon to staff St. Joseph's and to take over the school which the diocese had begun in 1876, Pio Nono College. One Macon thoroughfare (Pio Nono Avenue) is a reminder of the school named after Pope Pius IX. (Pio Nono is Italian for Pius Ninth). In 1888, one year after coming to Macon, the Jesuits were determined to build a church more worthy of the Lord of Hosts. The site of the present church was selected and the negotiations were completed when Father Joseph Winkelried, S.J., became pastor. The foundation of the church was laid in August, 1889. On June 16, 1892, the basement of the church, which was used for services until 1903, was blessed by Bishop Becker. Fourteen years after work on St. Joseph's Church had been started, the edifice was dedicated on November 15, 1903. Six bishops from various parts of the country assisted at the ceremony. The November 15, 1903, edition of the Macon Telegraph began its coverage of the Church's dedication with, If architecture may be fittingly described as frozen music, St. Joseph's Church, to be dedicated today, is a symphony.

== See also ==
- National Register of Historic Places listings in Bibb County, Georgia
