= Thomas C. Burke House =

Historic house in Georgia, United States

- U.S. National Register of Historic Places
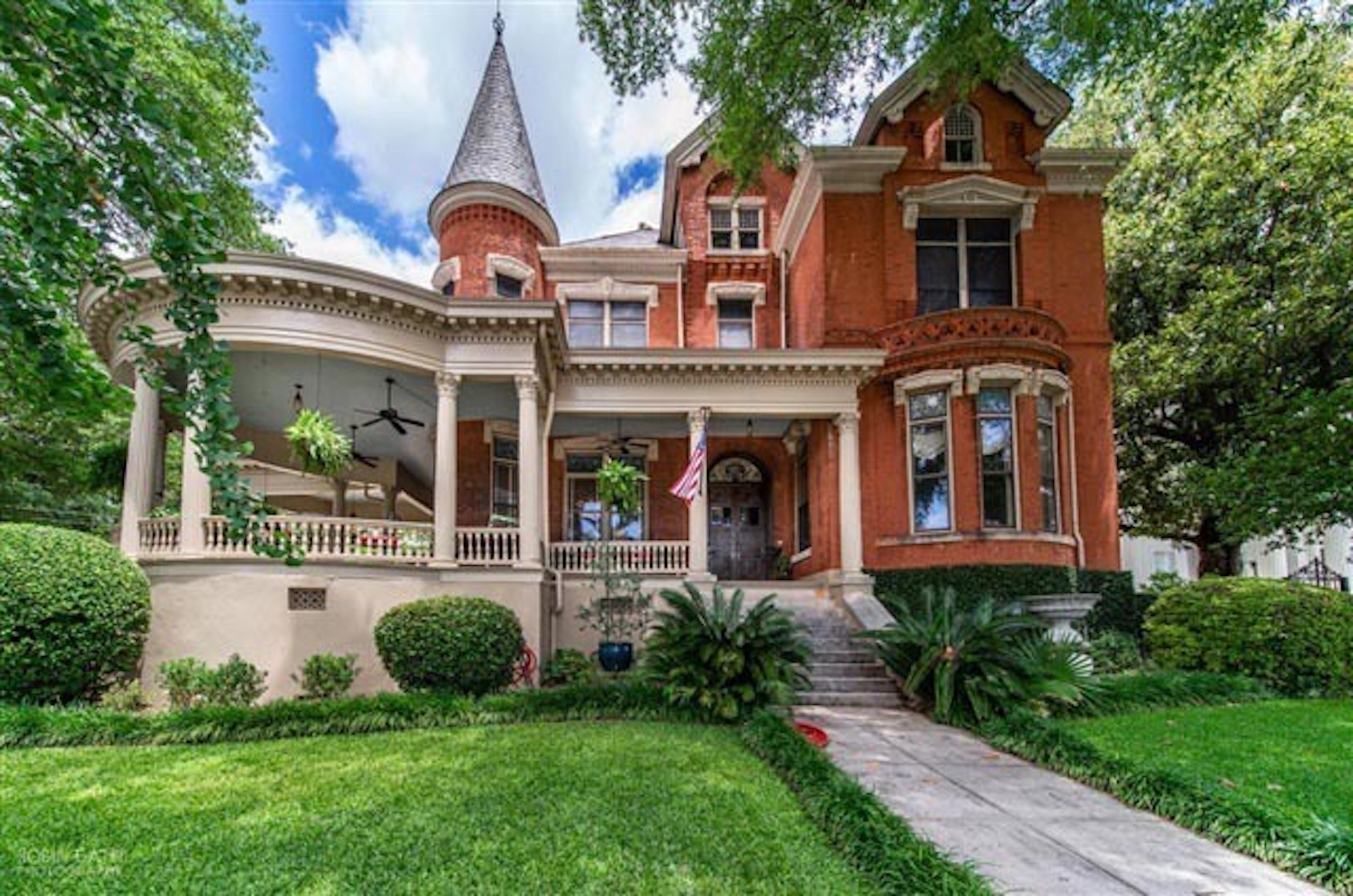

- Location within Georgia Location within the United States
- Location: 1085 Georgia Ave., Macon, Georgia
- Coordinates: 32.841194°N 83.636473°W
- Area: 1/3 acre (0.13 ha)
- Built: 1887
- Architectural style: Queen Anne
- NRHP reference No.: 71000248
- Added to NRHP: June 21, 1971

Thomas C. Burke House is an historic home located in downtown Macon, Georgia at 1085 Georgia Avenue. It is also known as Burke Mansion was designed in 1887 by architect DB Woodruff and remodeled in 1917 by architect Neel Reid. It is listed on the National Register of Historic Places.

== Details ==
It is a Victorian house sitting among a row of Greek Revival mansions. It has a series of gables and chimneys, and a round tower topped with a wrought iron finial and skirted with a porch. It features stained glass and terra cotta trim typical of Queen Ann style architecture, and has been called "one of the finest Queen Anne type houses anywhere in the country." There is a carriage house to the rear of the main house.

Born in New York in 1856, Thomas C. Burke moved to Macon, Georgia with his Irish parents, Christopher and Catharine, at the young age of four. Burke created his wealth through a building supply house company, the T.C. Burke Company. Thomas was one of five owners of the Academy of Music in Macon and assisted in the opening of Saint Joseph Catholic Church, Mount de Sales Academy (MDS), and many of Macon’s other developments.

He finished the interior of his house with the finest of fixtures, hardware and woods. Shortly before World War I the Burke family employed architect Neel Reid to update the interior of their home, and he selected many furnishings from Europe. Mr. Burke's daughters the Misses Martina and Mae Burke, established the T.C. Burke Foundation, which has been invaluable aid to terminally ill cancer patients. The Misses Burke occupied the mansion until their deaths in 1964 and 1965.

The mansion was used as antique shop at one point, and is currently a bed and breakfast. It was listed on the National Register of Historic Places in 1971. The home was used to film portions of Tyler Perry’s Netflix film “Jazzman’s Blues” in 2021.

The home has a local reputation of being haunted. While staying at the house, guests have claimed to see ghostly figures, including a woman in a habit, appearing as a nun. The figure has been reported multiple time in the second floor room connected to the homes round tower. This is rumored to be Burke's sister, Maggie, who in 1885 was professed as Sister Mary Ligouri at the Mount de Sales Academy (MDS).

Read more at: https://www.macon.com/news/business/article290513089.html#storylink=cpy Read more at: https://www.macon.com/news/business/article290513089.html#storylink=cpy
