= National Register of Historic Places listings in Washington County, Georgia =

Map showing Washington County in Georgia

This is a list of properties and districts in Washington County, Georgia that are listed on the National Register of Historic Places (NRHP).

This National Park Service list is complete through NPS recent listings posted March 21, 2025.

== Current listings ==
	Name on the Register	Image	Date listed	Location	City or town	Description
1	Church-Smith-Harris Street Historic District		December 31, 1987 (#87001268)	E. Church, S. Smith, and S. Harris Sts. 32°58′44″N 82°48′29″W	Sandersville	
2	City Cemetery	City Cemetery	August 3, 1987 (#87001296)	W. Church, Cemetery, and Haynes Sts. 32°58′57″N 82°48′55″W	Sandersville	
3	Thomas Jefferson Elder High and Industrial School	Thomas Jefferson Elder High and Industrial School	May 12, 1981 (#81000202)	316 Hall St. 32°58′38″N 82°48′58″W	Sandersville	
4	Forest Grove		January 26, 2005 (#04001556)	1200 GA 242/Riddleville Rd. 32°57′51″N 82°47′25″W	Sandersville	library web page
5	Francis Plantation		July 3, 1975 (#75000616)	SE of Davisboro on SR 2189 (Josey Church Road?); 32°55′52″N 82°33′28″W	Davisboro	
6	Holt Brothers Banking Company Building	Holt Brothers Banking Company Building	July 28, 1994 (#94000710)	100-106 Malone St. 32°59′02″N 82°48′39″W	Sandersville	
7	James E. Johnson House	James E. Johnson House	July 28, 1994 (#94000711)	425 W. Church St. 32°58′54″N 82°49′03″W	Sandersville	
8	James Kelley House		July 28, 1994 (#94000712)	Tennille-Harrison Rd. E of jct. with GA 15; 32°55′53″N 82°48′01″W	Tennille	
9	Charles Madden House	Charles Madden House	July 28, 1994 (#94000713)	302 E. South Central St. 32°56′12″N 82°48′28″W	Tennille	
10	North Harris Street Historic District		July 20, 1989 (#89000801)	Roughly bounded by First Ave., Washington Ave., E. McCarty St., N. Harris St., Malone St., and Warthen St. 32°59′20″N 82°48′37″W	Sandersville	
11	Sandersville Commercial and Industrial District	Sandersville Commercial and Industrial District	March 1, 2002 (#02000120)	Roughly Jernigan, Gilmore, North Smith, East Haynes, W. Haynes, and Warthen Sts. 32°59′03″N 82°48′35″W	Sandersville	
12	Sandersville High School		December 9, 2019 (#100004745)	514 North Harris St. 32°59′41″N 82°48′33″W	Sandersville	
13	Thomas W. Smith House	Thomas W. Smith House	July 28, 1994 (#94000714)	306 N. Main St. 32°56′21″N 82°48′38″W	Tennille	
14	Tennille Banking Company Building	Tennille Banking Company Building	July 28, 1994 (#94000715)	102-104 N. Main St. 32°56′11″N 82°48′41″W	Tennille	
15	Tennille Baptist Church	Tennille Baptist Church	July 28, 1994 (#94000716)	201-205 N. Main St. 32°56′20″N 82°48′41″W	Tennille	
16	Tennille Woman's Clubhouse	Tennille Woman's Clubhouse	July 1, 1998 (#98000815)	132 Smith St. 32°56′16″N 82°48′45″W	Tennille	
17	Warthen Historic District	Warthen Historic District	July 25, 1997 (#97000755)	Jct. of GA 15, GA 102, Warthen St., Old Sadersville-Sparta and Walker Dairy Rds. 33°06′12″N 82°48′18″W	Warthen	
18	Washington County Courthouse	Washington County Courthouse	September 18, 1980 (#80001260)	Courthouse Sq. 32°59′00″N 82°48′43″W	Sandersville	Is also in the Sandersville Commercial and Industrial District
19	Washington Manufacturing Company		July 28, 1994 (#94000717)	Between E. Montgomery and Church Sts. at White Line St. 32°56′33″N 82°48′16″W	Tennille	Main building has been demolished
20	Wrightsville and Tennille Railroad Company Building	Wrightsville and Tennille Railroad Company Building	July 28, 1994 (#94000718)	119 Central Ave. 32°56′06″N 82°48′46″W	Tennille	
