= Georgia State Route 68 =

State highway in Georgia, United States

State Route 68
- SR 68 highlighted in red

Route information
- Maintained by GDOT
- Length: 18.7 mi (30.1 km)

Major junctions
- South end: SR 57 in Veal
- SR 272 north-northeast of Veal; SR 15 in Tennille
- North end: SR 24 / SR 24 Spur / SR 540 west of Sandersville

Location
- Country: United States
- State: Georgia
- County: Washington

Highway system
- Georgia State Highway System; Interstate; US; State; Special
← SR 67	→ SR 69

State Route 68 (SR 68) is an 18.7-mile-long (30.1 km) state highway that travels south-to-north, in the shape of the letter L, through portions of Washington County in the east-central part of the U.S. state of Georgia. It connects SR 57 southeast of Oconee with SR 24/SR 540 and SR 24 Spur west of Sandersville.

== Route description ==
SR 68 begins at an intersection with SR 57 southeast of Oconee. It heads to the north-northeast to an intersection with SR 272. Then, it continues northeast until it enters Tenille. There, SR 68 has a short concurrency with SR 15. At the northern end of the concurrency, SR 68 turns to the northwest until it meets its northern terminus, an intersection with SR 24/SR 540 (Fall Line Freeway) just west of Sandersville. Here, the roadway continues as SR 24 Spur (Yank Brown Road).

== Major intersections ==
The entire route is in Washington County.

Location	mi	km	Destinations	Notes
Veal	0.0	0.0	SR 57 / River Road south – Irwinton, Wrightsville	Southern terminus of SR 68; northern terminus of River Road
	2.2	3.5	SR 272 – Oconee	Southern terminus of SR 272
Tennille	13.5	21.7	SR 15 south – Wrightsville	Southern end of SR 15 concurrency
Tennille	14.0	22.5	SR 15 north (Fourth Street) – Sandersville	Northern end of SR 15 concurrency
	18.7	30.1	SR 24 / SR 540 (Fall Line Freeway) / SR 24 Spur north (Yank Brown Road) – Milledgeville, Sandersville, Deepstep	Northern terminus of SR 68; southern terminus of SR 24 Spur
1.000 mi = 1.609 km; 1.000 km = 0.621 mi: Concurrency terminus
