= Ben J. Tarbutton =

American businessman and politician

Mayor of Sandersville, Georgia
- In office 1948–1952

Member of Georgia State Senate
- In office 1947–1949

Member of Georgia House of Representatives
- In office 1949–1953

Personal details
- Born: Benjamin James Tarbutton; May 14, 1885 Sandersville, Georgia, U.S.
- Died: September 19, 1962 (aged 77) Sandersville, Georgia, U.S.
- Resting place: Old City Cemetery
- Spouse: Rosa Moore McMaster (m. 1928)
- Children: 2
- Education: Emory College

Benjamin James Tarbutton (May 14, 1885 – September 19, 1962) was a businessman and politician in Georgia.

== Early life ==
Benjamin James Tarbutton was born on May 14, 1885, in Sandersville, Georgia. He graduated from Emory College in Oxford, Georgia, in 1905. He was a member of the Phi Delta Theta fraternity.

== Career ==
After working in his father's mercantile business, he purchased the Sandersville Railroad in 1916, and was the president and director of the Central of Georgia Railroad from 1951 to 1954. He was involved in starting the kaolin mining industry to Sandersville. He was mayor of Sandersville from 1948 to 1952, a member Georgia State Senate from 1947 to 1949 and of the Georgia House of Representatives from 1949 to 1953, and a member of the Georgia delegation to the Democratic National Convention in 1952 and 1956.

== Personal life ==
Tarbutton married Rosa Moore McMaster of Waynesboro, Georgia, on November 22, 1928. They had two children, Ben and Hugh.

== Death ==
Tarbutton died on September 19, 1962, in Sandersville. He was buried at the Old City Cemetery in Sandersville.
