= Georgia State Route 272 =

State highway in Georgia, United States

State Route 272
- SR 272 highlighted in red

Route information
- Maintained by GDOT
- Length: 15.4 mi (24.8 km)
- Existed: 1950–present

Major junctions
- South end: SR 68 north-northeast of Veal
- North end: SR 24 / SR 540 southeast of Milledgeville

Location
- Country: United States
- State: Georgia
- County: Washington

Highway system
- Georgia State Highway System; Interstate; US; State; Special
← SR 271	→ SR 273

State Route 272 (SR 272) is a 15.4-mile-long (24.8 km) north–south state highway located in the east-central part of the U.S. state of Georgia. Its path is entirely within Washington County.

== Route description ==
SR 272 begins at an oblique intersection with SR 68 northwest of Veal, in the southwestern part of Washington County. It heads north, passing Bay Branch Cemetery. Then, it curves to the northwest to intersections with McBride Lane and Deer Hunter Road, in rapid succession. Just past Deer Hunter Road, the highway passes Carter Cemetery. It continues heading northwest, with a slight northward jog, until it passes Antioch Cemetery. Farther to the northwest is the town of Oconee, where SR 272 crosses over a Norfolk Southern Railway line and Sandy Hill Creek. Just past the Oconee town limits is Cox Town Road. Later on is an intersection with Tennille–Oconee Road, which leads to Tennille. It then crosses over Buffalo Creek and intersects Spring Lake Road, which leads to Cochran Pond. Later on, the highway crosses over Bluff Creek and intersects Adams Road. Farther to the northwest, SR 272 meets its northern terminus, an intersection with SR 24/SR 540 (Fall Line Freeway) southeast of Milledgeville, in the northwestern part of Washington County.

== History ==
SR 272 was established in 1950 along the same alignment as it runs today. By 1955, the section from the southern terminus to Oconee was paved. By 1963, the road was paved to about halfway between Oconee and its northern terminus, and by 1966, the road was paved the rest of the way.

== Major intersections ==
The entire route is in Washington County.

Location	mi	km	Destinations	Notes
	0.0	0.0	SR 68 – Sandersville	Southern terminus
	15.4	24.8	SR 24 / SR 540 (Fall Line Freeway) – Milledgeville, Sandersville, Augusta	Northern terminus
1.000 mi = 1.609 km; 1.000 km = 0.621 mi
