= Wrightsville and Tennille Railroad =

The Wrightsville and Tennille Railroad (W&T) was chartered in 1883 with the purpose of building a connection with the Central of Georgia Railroad at Tennille, GA to Wrightsville, GA. The line started construction, and by March 1884, 1.5 miles had been completed, however grading work was delayed at that time by heavy rains. In April 1884, they acknowledged the use of convict lease labor for the construction of the rail line, citing that there were 43 men that were working on the line. By June of 1884, 2.5 miles had been completed, and an additional 3.5 miles had been graded, the average cost was cited as $1,200-$1,500 a mile. Later that same year, in a push to build the line faster, 80 additional men who were part of the convict lease labor force at the farm of Honorable J M Smith of Oglethorpe were sent to work on the line for 40 days. The line was completed in March 1885, and in May 1885 there were over 1,700 ticketed passengers on the line. Prices had been posted in February 1885 which cited each passenger's cost at 4 cents per mile.

Since 1884, there had been questions around if the line would expand through to Dublin, GA and Cochran, GA, these continued in 1885 in public venues. In 1886, the W&T merged with the Dublin and Wrightsville Railroad and gained a through line to Dublin, GA. This was sanctioned by a vote by investors in both firms, however, was unpopular for some investors in the W&T. Despite this outcry, the merger went ahead, adding 35 miles of track to the W&T. The W&T reported earnings of $30,985.56 for 1886, with expenditures of $24,378.46, and cited that investors could expect to see the net earnings of $6,607.10 double in the next year with the expansion that had been completed. By August of 1887 they reported a 20% return on investment.

In 1887 the W&T moved their offices from Wrightsville to Tennille. With this move, they also expanded the infrastructure along their routes, installing telegraph lines, and building rail houses for the engines at the ends of their route.

In 1896 the line was extended to Hawkinsville, GA through a purchase of a branch of the Oconee and Western Railroad. Then in 1907, the W&T acquired the Dublin and Southwestern Railroad which ran from Dublin to Eastman, GA. Service west of Dublin ended in 1941 through abandonment of two branch lines.

The remainder of the W&T was merged into the Central of Georgia on June 1, 1971. The line currently serves Norfolk Southern as a storage track for excess autoracks due to the slow down in the U.S auto business. The former Wrightsville & Tennille headquarters is still intact as a private residence in Tennille, Georgia.
