= Holt Brothers Banking Company Building =

- U.S. National Register of Historic Places
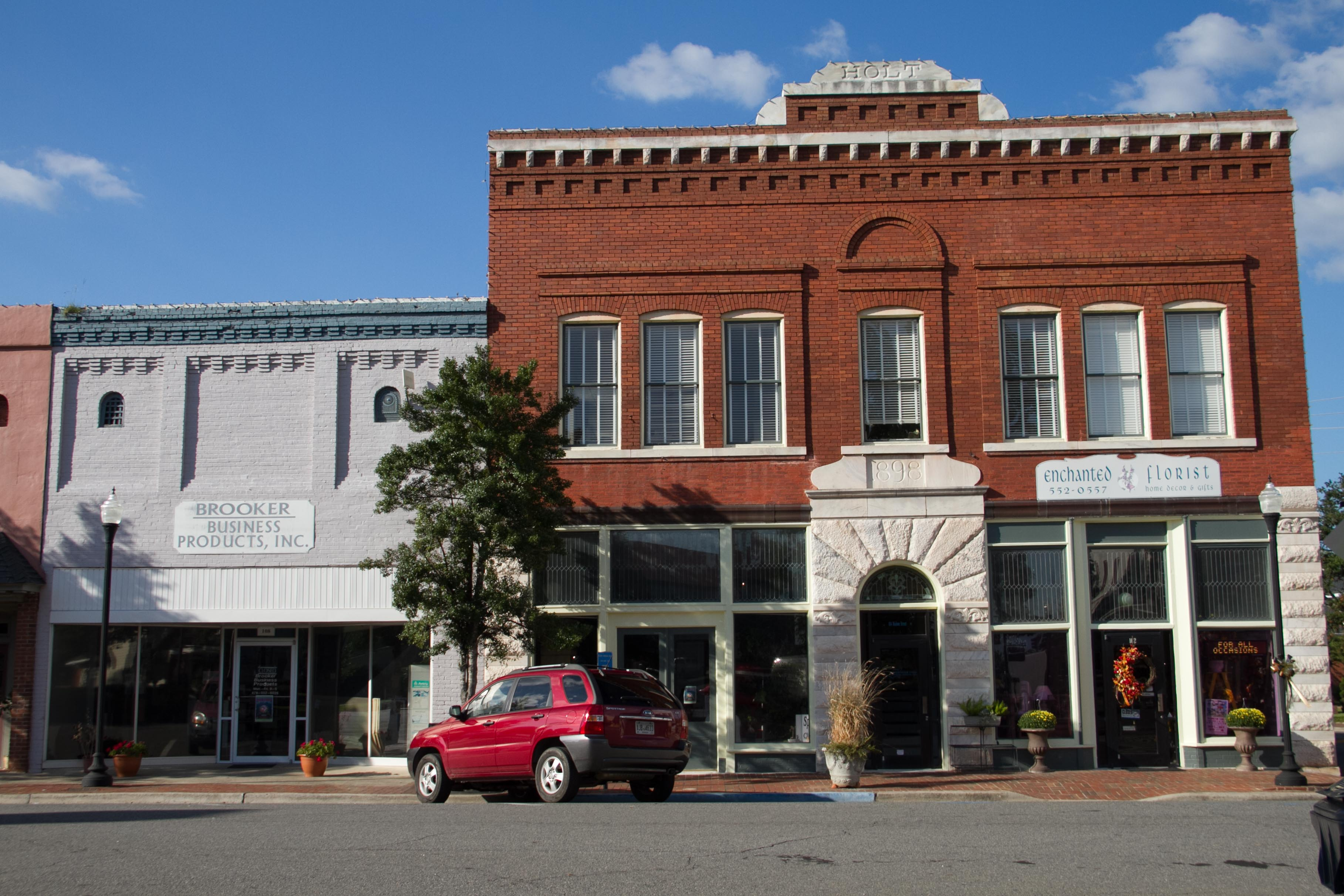

- Location within Georgia Location within the United States
- Location: 100–106 Malone St., Sandersville, Georgia
- Coordinates: 32°59′02″N 82°48′39″W
- Area: less than one acre
- Built: 1898
- Architect: Charles E. Choate
- Architectural style: Renaissance, Italianate
- MPS: Buildings Designed by Charles Edward Choate Constructed in Washington County MPS
- NRHP reference No.: 94000710
- Added to NRHP: July 28, 1994

Holt Brothers Banking Company Building is a historic site in Sandersville, Georgia. It was added to the National Register of Historic Places in 1994. It is located at 100–106 Malone Street. It was designed by Charles E. Choate.

The bank was built in 1898 as the Holt Brothers Building, and in 1901 the brothers, who were farmers and businessmen, opened the First National Bank there. It was built as a two-story brick building with ashlar marble. Its front door had a stained glass fanlight, and beside the door, in marble, was carved "Chas. E. Choate - Architect and Builder". The brothers sold the building to the First National Bank in 1914. The bank was later owned by Gordon S. Chapman, publisher and mayor in Sandersville. In 1994 the first floor space was occupied by two clothing stores.

== See also ==
- Tennille Banking Company Building
- National Register of Historic Places listings in Washington County, Georgia
