= Sandersville Railroad =

Shortline railroad in U.S. state of Georgia

Logo of the Sandersville Railroad

The Sandersville Railroad (reporting mark SAN) was originally operated from Tennille, Georgia, to Sandersville, Georgia and chartered in 1893 as a subsidiary of the Central of Georgia Railroad.

== Location ==
It was extended north five miles from Sandersville to a kaolin mine and processing plants near Deepstep. It continues to operate the same nine miles as of 2017 along with two branch lines and is nicknamed The Kaolin Road.

The company has its main office, dispatchers, locomotive and railcar maintenance shops, maintenance-of-way equipment shed, and locomotive fuel towers and sanding tower, all located in historic downtown Sandersville, Georgia.

== Equipment ==
The Sandersville Railroad Company owns a fleet of modern diesel electric switcher locomotives built by the Electro Motive Division of General Motors Corporation (EMD) but their first diesel electric locomotive was the Fairbanks-Morse H-12-44, numbered SAN 100, that has now been long retired. They have 4 EMD SW1500s with the road numbers SAN 1100, 1300, 1400, and 1500 respectively.

The newest addition to the fleet is an EMD MP15DC purchased in October 2016 from Norfolk Southern Railroad; it has the road number SAN 1600 and was bought to replace the EMD SW1200 road number SAN 1200 that was sold in the spring of 2018. The SAN 1600 is as of July 2018 still in its Norfolk Southern-style black and white paint but now has the Sandersville Railroad-style paint job with the road number SAN 1600 to align with the rest of the fleet. The EMD SW1500 SAN 1400 was also originally a Norfolk Southern locomotive and was delivered in the black and white just as the SAN 1600 but has now been repainted to the standard Sandersville Railroad Company paint scheme of a white body with a red single stripe running along both sides of the hood ending near the belt driven radiator fan on the front of the units, with the word Sandersville in red on both sides, and red road numbers and reporting marks SAN in red on the cabs in the style of the old Seaboard Air Line Railroad.

The company also owns two slug units which the SAN refers to as "boosters". The first one is a former Rock Island Railroad Company GE (General Electric)-built Universal Series U25B road switcher that was turned from a conventional locomotive to a road slug later in its life. The operator's cab, auxiliary cab, diesel engine (prime mover), air compressor, and radiator were all removed from the frame. A large concrete ballast block was installed, along with a new long full-length hood that has electric-powered traction motor blowers on each end to cool the 4 DC electric traction motors on each axle, as it did when it was a regular engine. The cab has headlights on each end and a ratchet-style handbrake on the B-end. The fuel tank of the engine was removed and it became a full road slug that now receives its power from whatever mother unit it is multi-unit (MU) connected to. The Rock Island Railroad later sold one of its converted GE road slugs to the Sandersville Railroad Company and it became the SAN 90. In 1994 the company bought an additional slug unit from Norfolk Southern that became the SAN 91 that has a shorter body and vertically mounted "tombstone" style headlights. All engines in the fleet have the twin "ditch" gauge lights on each end as well.

Up until the year 2009, the company also used a former Louisville & Nashville Railroad bay window caboose whose road number was SAN 60 but it was retired as the company didn't want to have to keep its old friction bearing axles constantly serviced and FRA Certified. It was taken through downtown Sandersville, Georgia during the October of year 2009 "Kaolin Festival Parade" on the back of a lowboy tuck trailer in place of the railroad's normally used steam engine "General" parade float. After this, it was offloaded by mobile cranes back onto the tracks at the bulk transfer yard and then carried back to the Sandersville Yard by one of the locomotives to be parked behind 3 former Illinois Central Railroad wide-vision cupola cabooses owned by the company.

The Kaolin Road also used to own cushion underframe boxcars but they were all retired and sold to Norfolk Southern. The other fleet of railcars the company owns is a fleet of large and small covered hoppers used to transport bulk (powder) kaolin clay and a fleet of open-top hoppers for transporting pulpwood chips to paper mills.

== Service ==
Sandersville Railroad services the many kaolin processing plants in the area such as the Kentucky Tennessee Clay Company and Imerys Pigments Plant 2 both in Deepstep, and the Imerys Pigments Plant 1, KaMin LLC., Burgess Pigment Company, and Thiele Kaolin Company plants, all in Sandersville. The railroad also services Bulk Chemical Services, Fulghum Fibers Pulpwood Chip Mill, and the two Duraline pipe manufacturing plants. The profitable road also handles inbound and outbound grain shipments. The company interchanges in Tennille, Georgia with the Norfolk Southern Railway Company's Savannah District trains of their Georgia Division. The NS trains 191 and 192 from Brosnan Yard in Macon, Georgia to Columbia, South Carolina and the NS Trains 372 and 373 with their companion NS Trains 378 and 377 from Brosnan Yard in Macon, Georgia to Dillard Yard in Savannah, Georgia all make pick ups and drop offs in Tennille for the locals NS G23 and G24 as well as the Sandersville Railroad Company.

In 2018, NS began operating an evening yard switcher to switch inbound cars from Macon, Savannah, and Augusta. The Sandersville Railroad has a new bulk transfer (Transflow) terminal located on Waco Mill Road near Tennille that offloads bulk products into waiting B&H Transfer Company tractor-trailer rigs. This facility is located across the road from the mainline and freight yard on the site of a former pulpwood loading yard that the company used to load pulpwood onto flatcars for transport to paper mills.

The company also installed a state-of-the-art weigh-in-motion scale near its Waco Mill Yard in 2002 that weighs trains after being activated by a radio link from the locomotive. It lets the crews know it's working by activating the yellow and red signals and by speaking a computer radio message over the road channel. The scales transmit a weight chart to the office downtown so they will know which cars are overloaded and which ones are not. The Sandersville Railroad Company is one of the most profitable and professional shortline railroads in North America and has a well-maintained mainline of 132 and 136 pound-per-yard rail.

== Ownership ==
The Kaolin Road has been privately owned by the Tarbuttons of Sandersville, Georgia since 1916. Ben Tarbutton III is acting President of the SAN. His grandfather was also once president of the Central of Georgia Railroad. The Tarbutton family still runs the company daily and can be found in the main office in Sandersville during operations. Mr. Ben J. Tarbutton and Mr. Hugh M. Tarbutton had been at the helm of the company for many years. Mr. Hugh died in 2015 but his brother continues to run the railroad while Mr. Hugh's son Charles Tarbutton runs the trucking company which no longer has any affiliation with the railroad other than utilizing the railroad's transload facility.

== Gallery ==
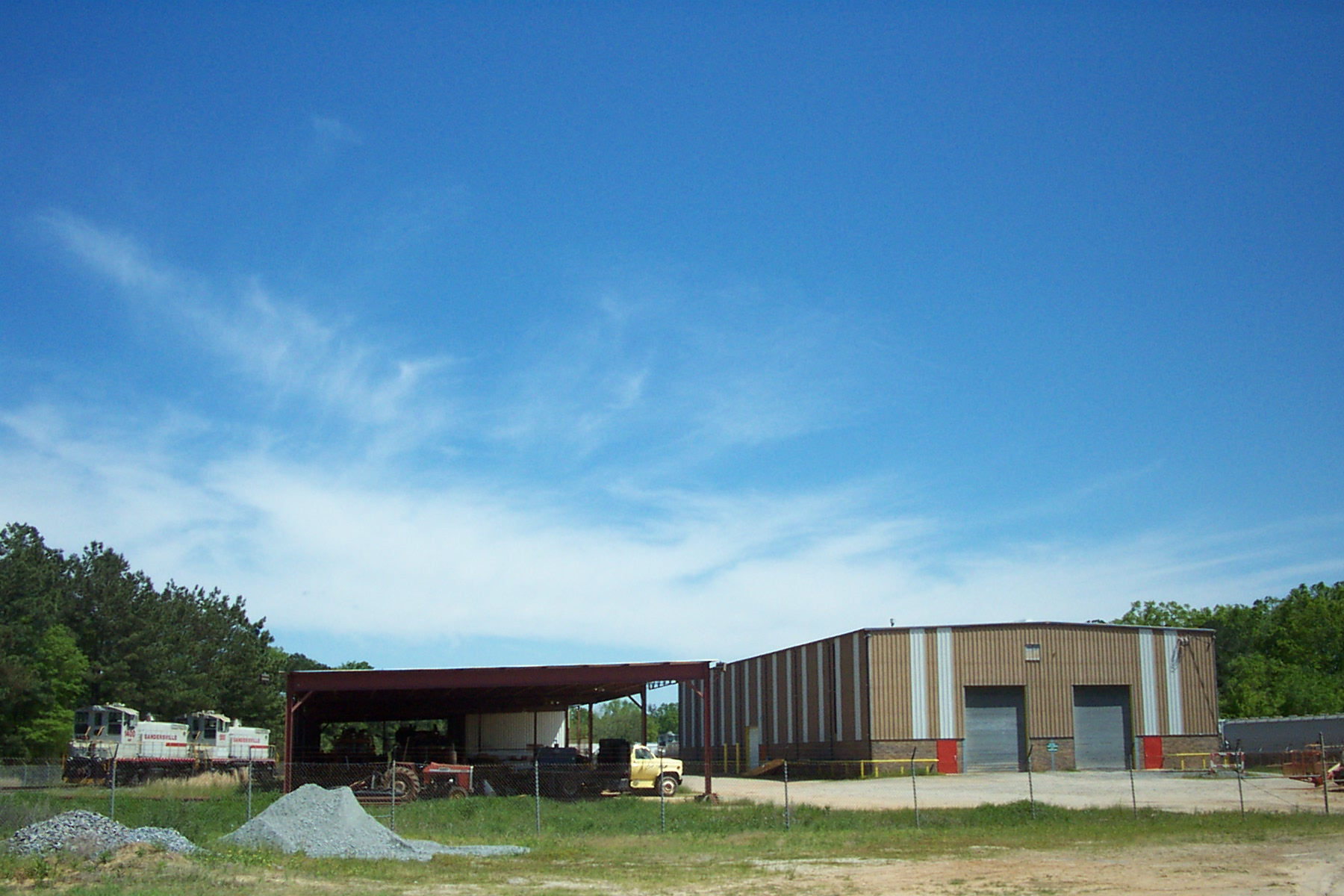
Sandersville Railroad locomotives and shops in Sandersville, GA.

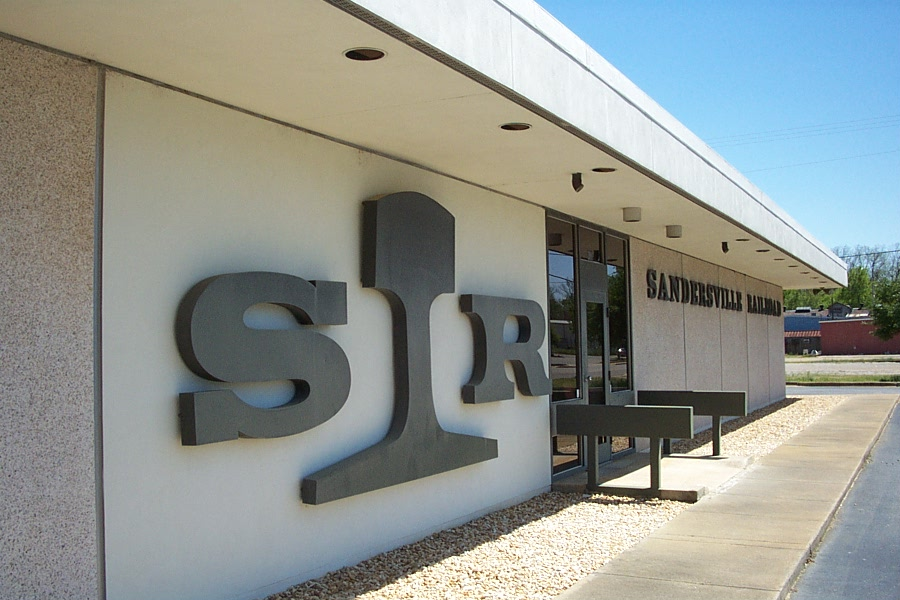
Sandersville Railroad headquarters building.
