= List of killings by law enforcement officers in the United States, July 2017 =

This is a list of people reported killed by non-military law enforcement officers in the United States in July 2017, whether in the line of duty or not, and regardless of reason or method. The listing documents the occurrence of a death, making no implications regarding wrongdoing or justification on the part of the person killed or officer involved. Killings are arranged by date of the incident that caused death. Different death dates, if known, are noted in the description. The table below lists 108 people.

== July 2017 ==
The following events occurred in reverse chronological in July of 2017.

| Date | Name (age) of deceased | Race | State (city) | Description |
|---|---|---|---|---|
| 2017-07-31 | Norberto Neiblas Reyes (39) | Hispanic | California (Los Banos) | |
| 2017-07-31 | Isaiah Tucker (28) | Black | Wisconsin (Oshkosh) | |
| 2017-07-31 | Robert Savelli (43) | White | New Mexico (Albuquerque) | |
| 2017-07-31 | Dwayne Jeune (32) | Black | New York (Brooklyn) | |
| 2017-07-29 | Anewki Gross Palanco (32) | | Puerto Rico (Carolina) | Gross Palanco was in a dispute with a food truck driver when he was shot in the face by off-duty officer Nieves Pérez Ortiz. Ortiz was found guilty of first-degree murder and sentenced to a total of 104 years in prison. |
| 2017-07-29 | Dennis W. Robinson (48) | White | Idaho (Melba) | |
| 2017-07-29 | Jashod Carter (34) | Black | California (Norco) | |
| 2017-07-28 | Raymond Cruz (37) | Hispanic | New Mexico (Albuquerque) | |
| 2017-07-28 | Rodney E. Jacobs (31) | Black | Missouri (Kansas City) | |
| 2017-07-28 | Brian J. Skinner (32) | White | New York (Glenville) | "Police say 32-year-old Brian Skinner exited the front of the home and came at officers with a knife. Officers from both departments then fired their weapons and killed Skinner." |
| 2017-07-27 | Sergio Velasco-Martinez (25) | Hispanic | California (Avenal) | |
| 2017-07-27 | Alejandro Alvarado (35) | Hispanic | California (Chowchilla) | |
| 2017-07-27 | Jerauld Phillip Hammond (46) | White | California (Los Angeles) | |
| 2017-07-27 | Michael Fitzgerald (26) | White | California (Grand Terrace) | |
| 2017-07-27 | Matthew L. Folden (31) | White | Washington (Wenatchee) | Folden was shot by a police officer who responded to a 911 call. Dispatch described a man who was screaming and wielding a knife while pacing back and forth in the parking lot outside a store. |
| 2017-07-26 | Giovani Casiano (26) | White | Texas (San Antonio) | |
| 2017-07-26 | Andrew Collins (35) | White | Arizona (Phoenix) | |
| 2017-07-26 | Kesharn K. Burney (25) | Black | Ohio (Dayton) | |
| 2017-07-26 | Susan Teel (62) | White | Florida (Vero Beach) | |
| 2017-07-25 | Alexander J. Schoessel (23) | White | Virginia (Richmond) | |
| 2017-07-25 | Aries Clark (16) | Black | AR (Marion) | |
| 2017-07-25 | Moises Balladares (33) | Hispanic | Arizona (Avondale) | |
| 2017-07-25 | Michael Joseph Harris (28) | White | Florida (Jacksonville) | |
| 2017-07-24 | Jerrod Kershaw (31) | White | Missouri (St. Louis) | |
| 2017-07-24 | Ismael Lopez Rodriquez (41) | Hispanic | Mississippi (Southaven) | Police accidentally went to Lopez's house while trying to arrest his neighbor for domestic assault. Police claim that he was holding a rifle and refused verbal commands to drop it, but neighbors dispute this. Lopez was shot through his front door. |
| 2017-07-24 | Amy Josephine Kuehn (22) | | Florida (Volusia County) | Amy (who was un-armed and had committed no crime) was killed by Trooper Cameron Joseph, who drove his patrol car nearly 153 feet off of the road, and ran her over. Joseph violated the agency’s own pursuit policy, and the investigation resulted in Joseph, who was chasing her at “nearly 20 miles per hour,” being issued a traffic citation for failure to use due care toward a pedestrian. The charge (against Joseph) was dismissed by Volusia County Judge Christopher Kelly because the judge ruled that FHP did not have jurisdiction to issue a traffic citation on private property (the resident’s lawn). . |
| 2017-07-23 | Tyler Scott Rushing (34) | White | California (Chico) | |
| 2017-07-23 | Walter H. Lynde (49) | White | Massachusetts (Spencer) | |
| 2017-07-23 | Michael Caponigro (59) | White | Wisconsin (Eau Claire) | |
| 2017-07-21 | Martin Louis Avena (70) | Hispanic | Arizona (Chino Valley) | |
| 2017-07-21 | Vicente Velasquez (42) | Hispanic | Texas (Mission) | |
| 2017-07-21 | Yahir Brito Lucero (22) | Hispanic | California (Santa Ana) | |
| 2017-07-20 | Joshua D. Daniels (52) | White | Missouri (Neosho) | |
| 2017-07-20 | Daniel Cash (45) | White | Georgia (Tallapoosa) | |
| 2017-07-20 | Isaiah Perkins (27) | Black | Missouri (St. Louis) | |
| 2017-07-19 | Farhad Jabbari (38) | Asian | Michigan (Saginaw) | |
| 2017-07-19 | Anthony Benavidez (24) | White | New Mexico (Santa Fe) | |
| 2017-07-19 | Nolan Cornett (24) | White | California (Fair Oaks) | |
| 2017-07-18 | Eric Wesley Clark (43) | | Virginia (Culpeper County) | Clark was shot by Culpeper County sheriff’s deputies after a vehicle pursuit that lasted several minutes and displayed a shotgun. |
| 2017-07-18 | Robert "Bob" Earl Vaughan (70) | White | Oregon (Springfield) | |
| 2017-07-18 | Daniel Thomas Reid (32) | White | Alabama (Clay) | |
| 2017-07-18 | Mark Allen Smith (36) | Unknown race | Arizona (Eagar) | |
| 2017-07-17 | Ernesto S. Sedillo (52) | Hispanic | New Mexico (Las Cruces) | |
| 2017-07-17 | India Nelson (25) | Black | Virginia (Norfolk) | |
| 2017-07-17 | Eric Wesley Clark (43) | White | Virginia (Boston) | |
| 2017-07-17 | Jose Cazares (37) | Hispanic | Texas (San Antonio) | |
| 2017-07-16 | Amanda Jensen (37) | White | California (Seal Beach) | |
| 2017-07-16 | David Mordi (24) | White | Washington (Mill Creek) | |
| 2017-07-15 | Justine Damond (40) | White | Minnesota (Minneapolis) | An Australian woman, Justine Damond, called police to report a possible sexual assault. After police arrived, Damond, wearing pyjamas, approached the driver's side door. The officer in the passenger seat, Mohamed Noor, shot Damond through the driver's side door, later telling a supervisor that he and his partner "got spooked." The body cameras of both Noor and his partner were turned off. Noor was subsequently tried and convicted, in 2019, of third-degree murder and second-degree manslaughter. |
| 2017-07-15 | Keith Wade (22) | White | Texas (Arlington) | |
| 2017-07-15 | Vaughn Shaw (23) | Black | California (Moreno Valley) | |
| 2017-07-15 | Gerber Dieguez (29) | Hispanic | California (Los Angeles) | |
| 2017-07-15 | Luis Fransisco Vasquez (32) | Hispanic | Arizona (Globe) | |
| 2017-07-15 | Amy Kuehn (22) | White | Florida (Winnemissett Park) | |
| 2017-07-13 | Pedro Rubio (42) | Hispanic | Arizona (Goodyear) | |
| 2017-07-13 | Chancy or Chancey Chamblee (55) | White | Arizona (Tucson) | |
| 2017-07-13 | Stephen Steele (56) | White | Florida (Zephyrhills) | |
| 2017-07-12 | James Gerald Davis (40) | White | South Carolina (Lake View) | |
| 2017-07-12 | Kenneth Alan Eustace (58) | White | California (Grover Beach) | |
| 2017-07-12 | Dorsey Glenn Taulbee Jr. (33) | Native American | Oklahoma (Oklahoma City) | |
| 2017-07-11 | Antonio Garcia Jr. (47) | Black | Kansas (Leavenworth) | |
| 2017-07-11 | Silas Andrew Smith (54) | White | Arizona (Golden Valley) | |
| 2017-07-11 | Gary Michael Haynes (44) | White | Virginia (Richmond) | |
| 2017-07-11 | Steve Scott (48) | White | Missouri (Poplar Bluff) | |
| 2017-07-11 | Randy Engstrom (34) | White | Wisconsin (Johnson Creek) | |
| 2017-07-11 | Caleb Edward Blaylock (27) | White | Nevada (Las Vegas) | |
| 2017-07-10 | Cody Ethan Mitchell (26) | White | Maryland (Mount Airy) | |
| 2017-07-10 | Gregory Shawn Thrower (39) | White | Minnesota (Harris) | |
| 2017-07-09 | Michael T. Ward (27) | Black | Maryland (Salisbury) | |
| 2017-07-09 | Edward Earl Taylor (54) | Black | Ohio (Akron) | |
| 2017-07-09 | Ryan Allen Probst (28) | White | Ohio (Uniontown) | |
| 2017-07-09 | Robert D. Yeiser (34) | White | Washington (Bainbridge Island) | Yeiser was shot by a SWAT team after he used a rifle to fire towards shoreline homes from his boat. |
| 2017-07-09 | Bryant Alvarez (24) | Hispanic | Illinois (Chicago) | A man was shot after holding his girlfriend and her child hostage. |
| 2017-07-08 | Cardell Vance III (23) | Black | Florida (Crescent City) | |
| 2017-07-08 | Michael Anthony Rude (22) | White | Washington (Lacey) | |
| 2017-07-08 | Tina Renee Medlin (50) | White | North Carolina (Benson) | |
| 2017-07-08 | James Michael Short (28) | White | North Carolina (Charlotte) | |
| 2017-07-07 | Kareem Ali Nadir Jones (30) | Black | Ohio (Franklinton) | |
| 2017-07-07 | Eurie Lee Martin (58) | Black | Georgia (Deepstep) | Killing of Eurie Martin |
| 2017-07-07 | Brian Easley (33) | Black | Georgia (Marietta) | |
| 2017-07-07 | Gabriel Sage Barnes (15) | White | Alabama (Morgan County) | Barnes was shot by police after a stolen car chase. |
| 2017-07-06 | Jesus Cervantes (35) | Hispanic | Florida (Plant City) | |
| 2017-07-06 | DeJuan Guillory (27) | Black | Louisiana (Mamou) | |
| 2017-07-05 | Alexander Bonds (34) | | New York (Bronx) | Bonds, who had a long history of severe mental illness (including schizophrenia) and anger at the police, killed New York City Police Officer Miosotis Familia while she was posted at an "R.V.-style police command" vehicle in the Bronx. New York City police officials called the attack a deliberate assassination. Familia's wounded partner called for backup and two officers shot and killed Bonds. |
| 2017-07-05 | Jonathon Coronel (24) | Hispanic | California (Vista) | |
| 2017-07-05 | James William Huskey (45) | White | Oklahoma (Sallisaw) | |
| 2017-07-05 | Tiffany Lynn Potter (29) | White | Iowa (Des Moines) | |
| 2017-07-05 | Edwin J. "Beanie" Esker (53) | White | Illinois (Maeystown) | |
| 2017-07-05 | Carroll Tuttle Jr. (51) | White | Maine (Madison) | |
| 2017-07-04 | Juan Manriquez (30) | Hispanic | Colorado (Federal Heights) | |
| 2017-07-04 | Donald Martin (39) | White | Illinois (Belleville) | |
| 2017-07-04 | Tyrone Orvy Peabody (53) | Native American | Colorado (Pleasant View) | |
| 2017-07-04 | Dana D. Dubose (36) | Black | Ohio (Vandalia) | |
| 2017-07-04 | Douglas West (46) | White | Washington (West Richland) | |
| 2017-07-04 | Miguel Gonzales (28) | Hispanic | New Mexico (Albuquerque) | |
| 2017-07-04 | Cody Ray McCray (32) | White | Utah (Farmington) | |
| 2017-07-03 | Holden Austin Gorka (25) | White | Oregon (Hillsboro) | A man who attempted to steal a helicopter from Hillsboro Airport was fatally shot by police. |
| 2017-07-03 | Zepp Crouchet (42) | Black | California (Antioch) | |
| 2017-07-03 | John Donadio (51) | White | Indiana (Fishers) | |
| 2017-07-03 | Christopher Harry Cashell (45) | White | Georgia (Bonaire) | |
| 2017-07-03 | Daniel Craven (53) | White | Washington (Spokane) | |
| 2017-07-03 | David Leon Bell (30) | Black | Georgia (Brunswick) | |
| 2017-07-03 | Holden Austin Gorka (25) | White | Oregon (Hillsboro) | |
| 2017-07-02 | Tyson Chad Williams (39) | White | Virginia (Norfolk) | |
| 2017-07-01 | Quintec Locke (37) | Black | Illinois (Chicago) | |
| 2017-07-01 | Patrick Sanchez (23) | Hispanic | Arizona (Glendale) | |
| 2017-07-01 | Unnamed person | Unknown race | Florida (Miami) | |
| 2017-07-01 | Jeremy Holmes (19) | White | Colorado (Fort Collins) | Police were called by Holmes' girlfriend that he was behaving violently with a knife. Responding to a home close to Colorado State University, police confronted Holmes holding the knife, and despite being told to drop it more than 40 times Holmes disobeyed, goading the police to shoot him. Eventually Holmes charged at one of the officers and was shot and killed by the other. |

== See also ==
- Death in custody § United States
- Henry A. Wallace Police Crime Public Database
- List of cases of police brutality
- List of countries with annual rates and counts for killings by law enforcement officers
- List of law enforcement officers killed in the line of duty in the United States
- List of law enforcement officers convicted for an on-duty killing in the United States
- List of shootings by US immigration agents
- List of police reforms related to the George Floyd protests
- List of unarmed African Americans killed by law enforcement officers in the United States
- Lists of killings by law enforcement officers
- Police brutality in the United States
- Police misconduct § United States
- Police riot § United States
- Police use of deadly force in the United States
