= Killing of Eurie Martin =

2017 police killing in Georgia, USA

Eurie Martin was a 58-year-old mentally ill African-American man who died while being detained on the evening of July 7, 2017.

Martin was walking along, or perhaps on, the road going from his home in Milledgeville toward Sandersville. In the settlement of Deepstep, Georgia, he asked Cyrus Harris, a local resident, for water. Harris called 911. While attempting to arrest and handcuff Martin, the deputies used Taser devices. Witnesses pointed out that two of the officers were obese.

The three policemen were fired and charged with felony murder, involuntary manslaughter, false imprisonment, aggravated assault and reckless conduct. Medical testimony showed Martin had no drugs in his system. The prosecution also produced witnesses that such a use of a Taser was not within the department's guidelines.

The deputies had to justify the use of tasers. They first said that Martin physically threatened him. Without reasonable suspicion of a crime, Martin could legally resist being handcuffed. Deputies testified that Martin was walking on the road as they arrived, a crime that justified the arrest. The prosecution argued that it was a rural road with no sidewalk, and people commonly walked down the road.

Eyewitnesses Lee Curtis Bentley and Susan Steele testified that the lawmen did not give aid to Martin while he was restrained, although this claim was later proven to be untrue, as video evidence shows at least one deputy as well as police officers and a first responder checking on him. The officer's defense initially claimed the killing was covered by Georgia's Stand Your Ground law. This was disallowed. They then maintained their actions were in fact within the Sheriff's Office guidelines and that they were not trained in those guidelines.

On October 25, 2021, the jury asked to see the video of the incident again. They then sent the judge a note saying they were unable to reach a unanimous verdict. The judge then jury read the Allen charge encouraging them to continue deliberations. Two days later, a mistrial was declared. In 2025, a second trial also ended in a mistrial.

== See also ==
- List of unarmed African Americans killed by law enforcement officers in the United States
