= City Cemetery (Sandersville, Georgia) =

Historic cemetery in Washington County, Georgia

- Old City Cemetery
- U.S. National Register of Historic Places
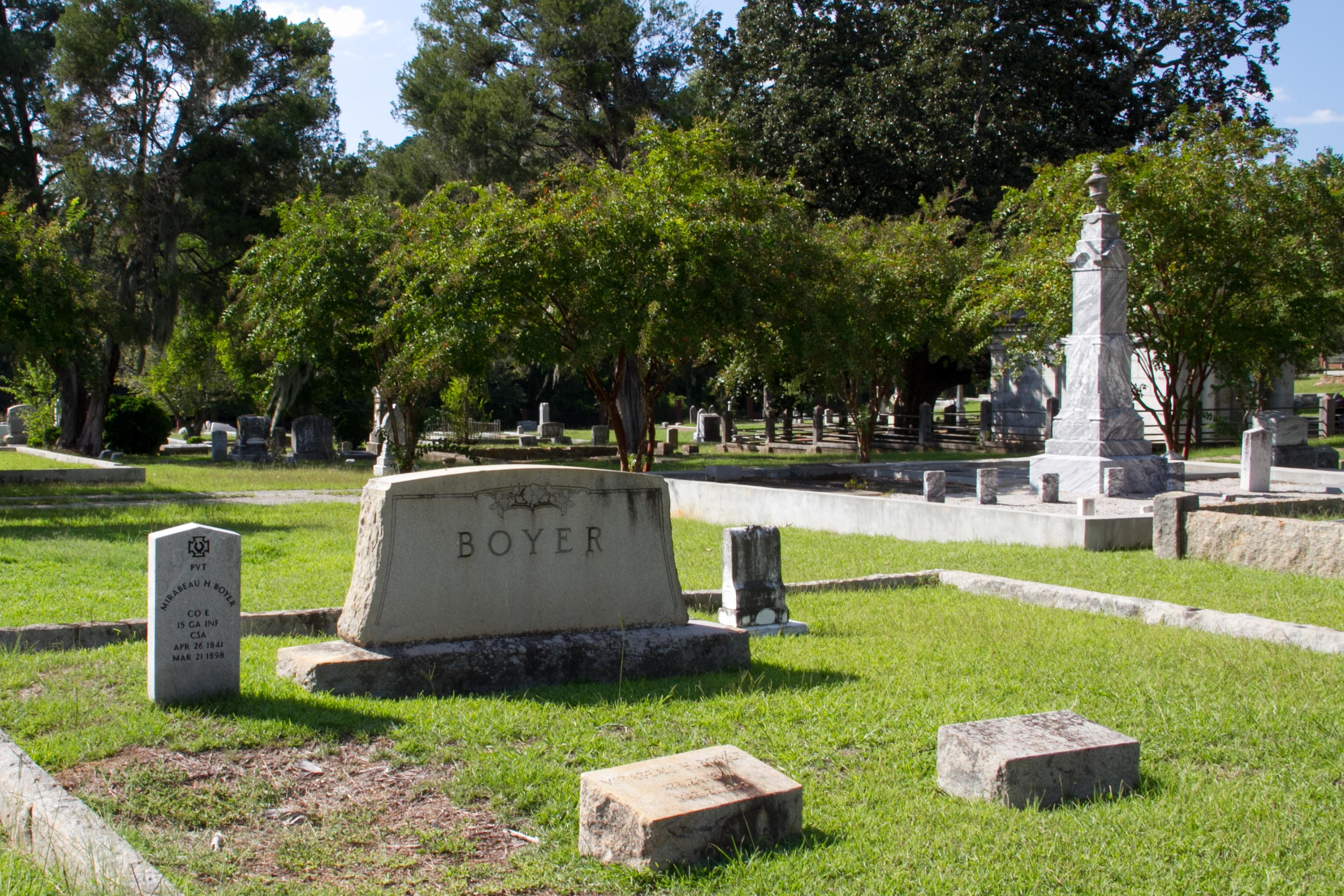

- Location within Georgia Location within the United States
- Location: 100 Virginia Ave., Sandersville, GA
- Coordinates: 32°58′56″N 82°48′54″W
- Area: 5.5 acres (2.2 ha)
- NRHP reference No.: 87001296
- Added to NRHP: August 3, 1987

City Cemetery, also known as the Sandersville Old City Cemetery, is located in Sandersville, Georgia.

== History ==
Old City Cemetery began as the cemetery of the local Methodist Episcopal Church. Eventually the cemetery expanded to its current 5.5 acres (2.2 ha) which is surrounded by West Church Street to the South, West Haynes Street to the North, Virginia Avenue to the East, and private property to the West.

City Cemetery was listed on the National Register of Historic Places in 1987.

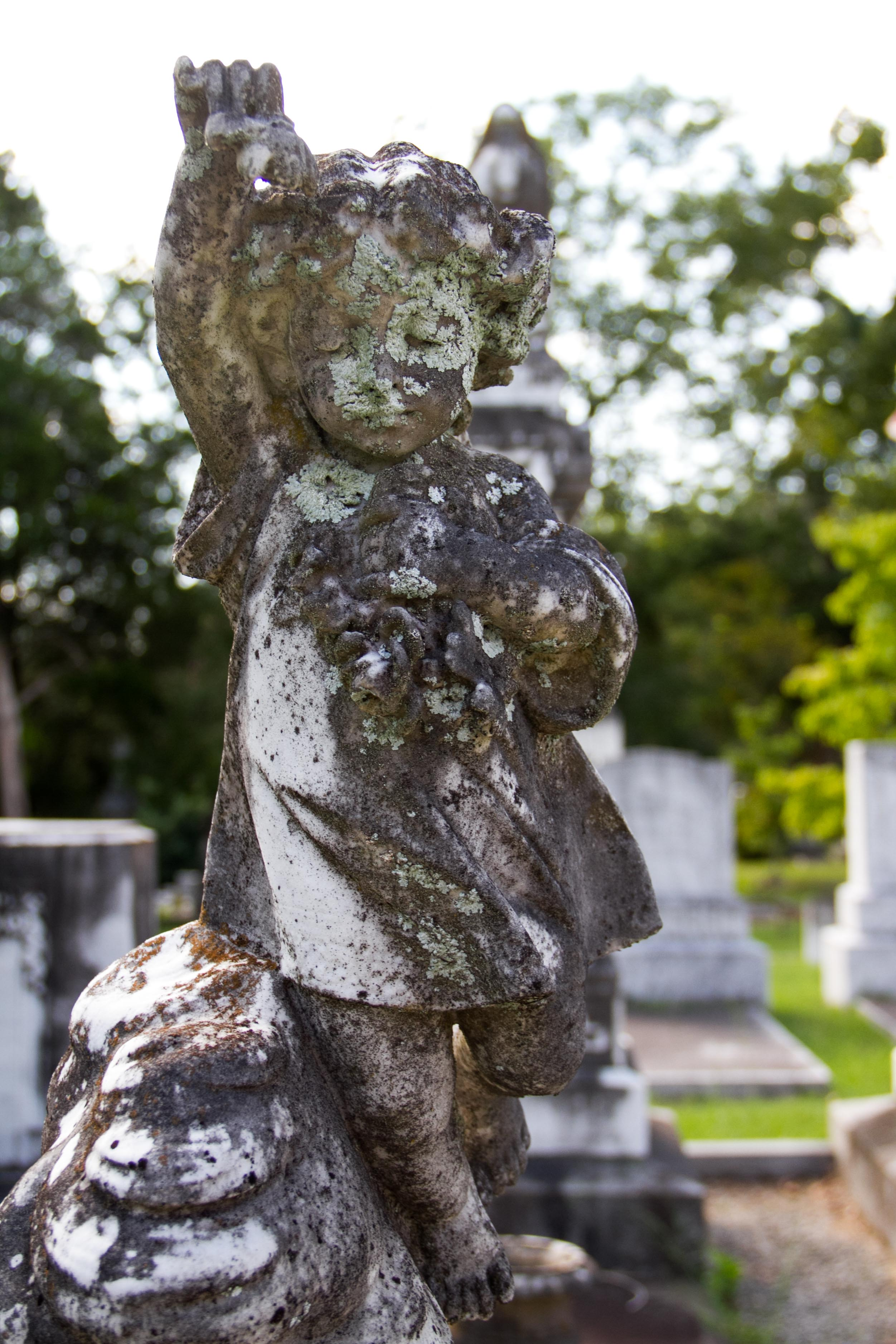
Victorian sculpture at the cemetery

== Notable interments ==
- Thomas W. Hardwick (1872–1944), a former U.S. senator and governor of Georgia
- Ben J. Tarbutton (1885–1962), state politician and mayor of Sandersville
