= Oconee and Western Railroad =

Abandoned or failed railroad project in Georgia, USA

Organized in 1892 in Georgia, United States, the Oconee and Western Railroad was founded to take over operations of the failed Empire and Dublin Railroad. The E&D had built a line from Dublin to Hawkinsville, and in 1896 the O&W had started to extend the line to Grovania. It was unclear if the line was never finished or if it was completed and immediately abandoned, as the Wrightsville and Tennille Railroad purchased the O&W in 1896 but apparently only used the Dublin to Hawkinsville section. The merger was completed in 1899.
