= Tennille Baptist Church =

Historic church in Georgia, United States

- U.S. National Register of Historic Places
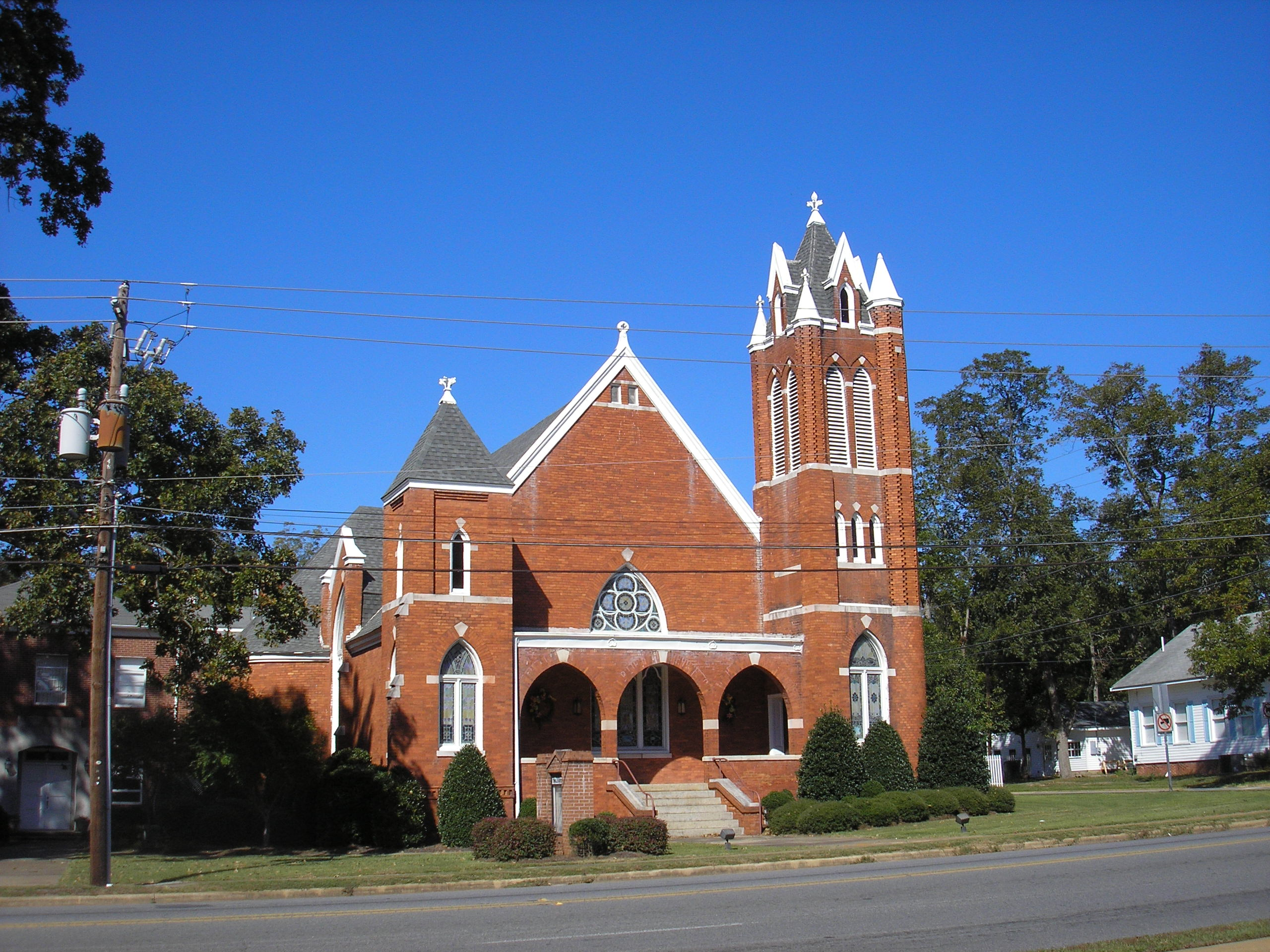

- Location within Georgia Location within the United States
- Location: 201-205 N. Main St., Tennille, Georgia
- Coordinates: 32.93876°N 82.81137°W
- Area: 2 acres (0.81 ha)
- Built: 1903
- Architect: Charles E. Choate
- Architectural style: Gothic
- MPS: Buildings Designed by Charles Edward Choate Constructed in Washington County MPS
- NRHP reference No.: 94000716
- Added to NRHP: July 28, 1994

The Tennille Baptist Church in Tennille, Georgia is a Southern Baptist church that was built in 1903. It was designed by architect Charles E. Choate in Gothic architecture. Choate was an architect and Methodist minister who lived in Tennille for many years and designed several buildings in the community.

The church was nominated for National Register of Historic Places listing as part of a multiple property listing, and was itself listed on the U.S. National Register of Historic Places in 1994.
