= Tennille Woman's Clubhouse =

- U.S. National Register of Historic Places
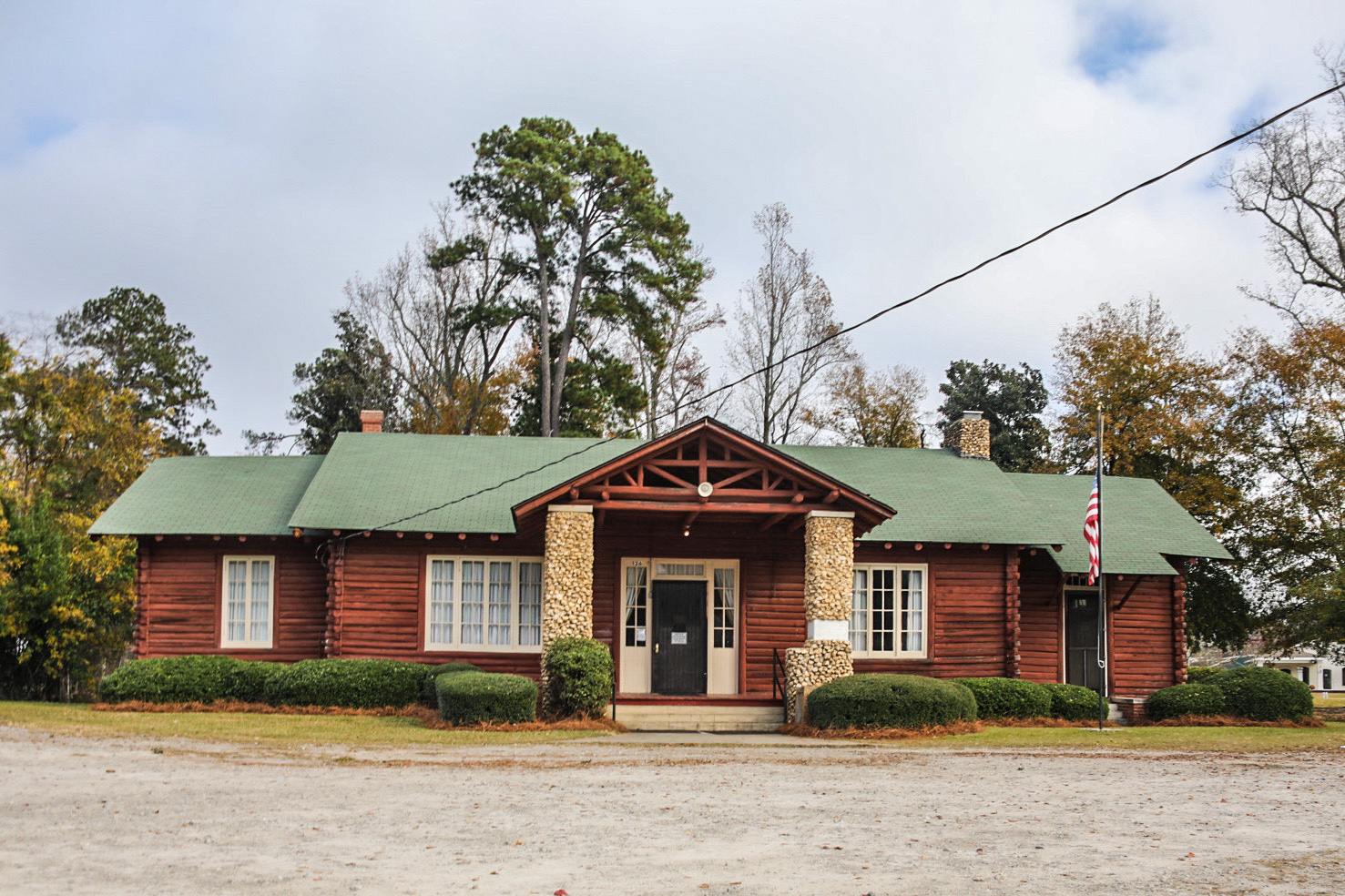

- Location within Georgia
- Location: 132 Smith St. Tennille, Georgia
- Coordinates: 32°56′16″N 82°48′45″W
- Area: less than one acre
- Built: 1922
- Built by: J.A. Mills, contractor
- Architectural style: American Craftsman
- NRHP reference No.: 98000815
- Added to NRHP: July 1, 1998

The Tennille Woman's Clubhouse, at 132 Smith St. in Tennille, Georgia, was built in 1922. It was listed on the National Register of Historic Places in 1998.

== Tennille Woman's Club ==
The Tennille Women's Club was founded in 1914 as a sewing club. It later took on civic projects and was incorporated in 1920 when it became a member of the Georgia Federation of Woman's Clubs and the General Federation of Women's Clubs. It "federated with the state and national program in 1921 after undergoing an application review in which the club had to be certified as being non-political and non-sectarian and being devoted to promoting better communities." In 1998 it was still active with about 40 members.

== The building ==
Built in 1922, Tennille Woman's Clubhouse is one-story log building, purpose-built to serve as a clubhouse. It is built in the Craftsman Style.

Its south room was the founding location of the first public-supported library in Washington County, which later moved.

== See also ==
- Dawson Woman's Club, Dawson, Georgia, another log building women's clubhouse, formerly NRHP-listed
