= Charles Madden House =

- U.S. National Register of Historic Places
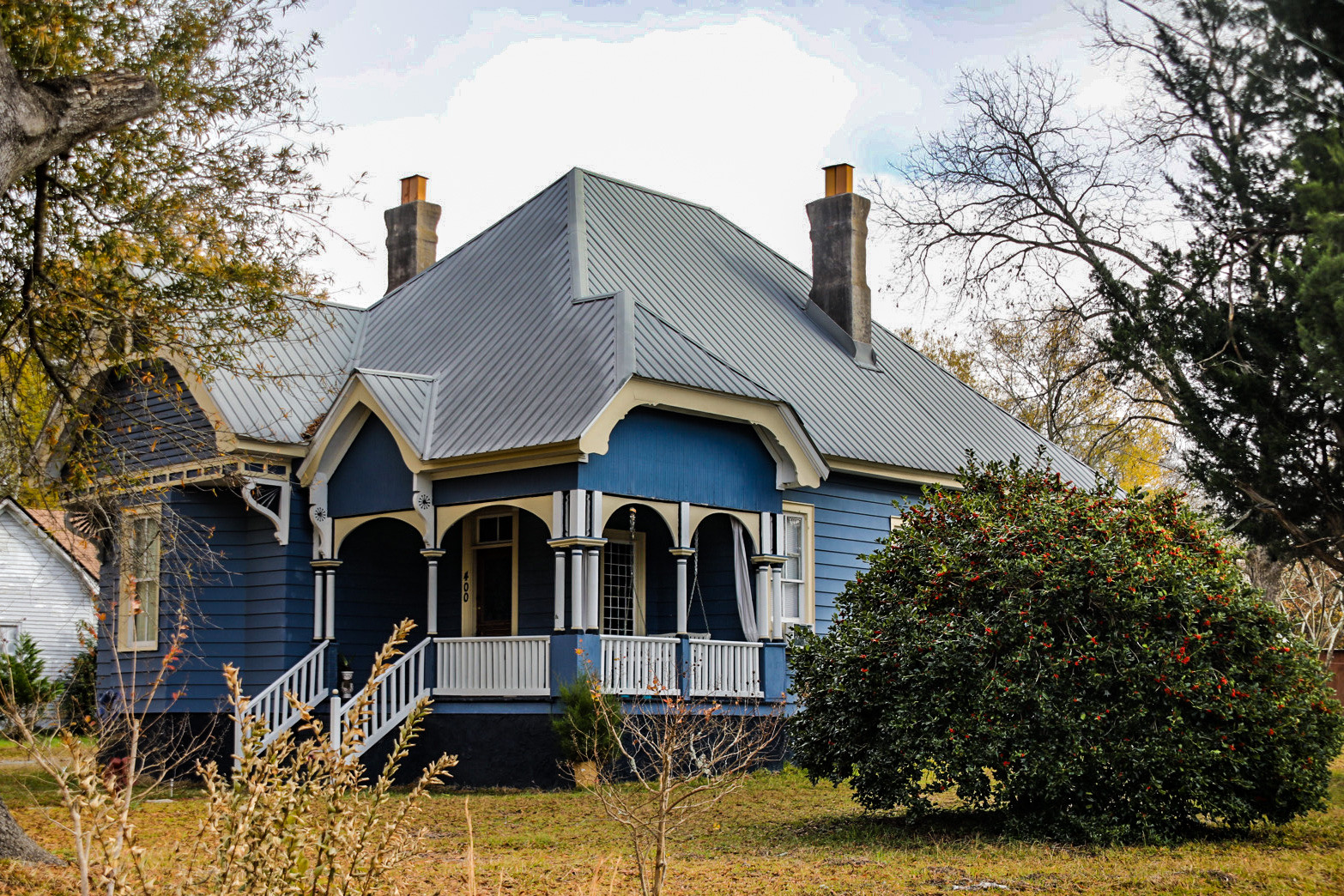

- Location within Georgia
- Location: 302 E. South Central St., Tennille, Georgia
- Coordinates: 32°56′12″N 82°48′28″W
- Area: less than one acre
- Built: 1899
- Architect: Charles E. Choate
- Architectural style: Queen Anne
- MPS: Buildings Designed by Charles Edward Choate Constructed in Washington County MPS
- NRHP reference No.: 94000713
- Added to NRHP: July 28, 1994

The Charles Madden House. at 302 E. South Central St. in Tennille, Georgia, was built in 1899. It was listed on the National Register of Historic Places in 1994.

It is a Queen Anne style house designed by architect Charles E. Choate.

Its National Register nomination asserts its significance as follows:

The Charles Madden House is significant in architecture because it is one of the architect Charles Choate's early residential structures in Washington County and it represents a more modest example of Choate's residential architecture. Furthermore, it is a very good and intact example of the Queen Anne style applied to a small, one-story house, and with its intact floor plan and massing it is a very good and intact example of the Queen Anne type of vernacular house found throughout Georgia at the turn of the century. The Madden house is also the only documented example of a Choate commission for a black client.

It has also been known as the Madden—Smith House.
