= Wrightsville and Tennille Railroad Company Building =

- U.S. National Register of Historic Places
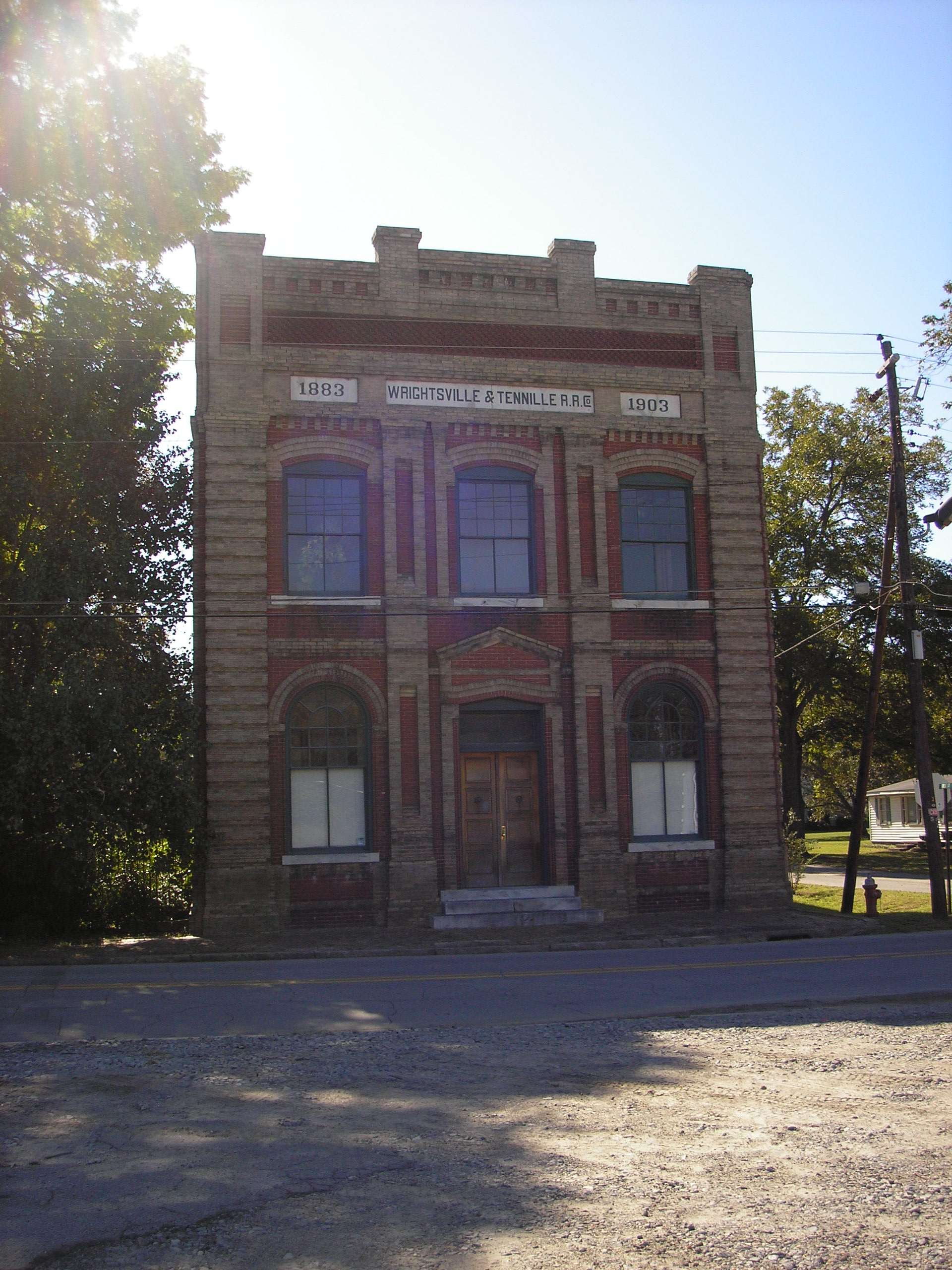

- Location within Georgia
- Location: 119 Central Ave., Tennille, Georgia
- Coordinates: 32.93500°N 82.81276°W
- Area: less than one acre
- Built: 1903
- Architect: Charles E. Choate; Smith, Cyril B.
- Architectural style: Beaux Arts
- MPS: Buildings Designed by Charles Edward Choate Constructed in Washington County MPS
- NRHP reference No.: 94000718
- Added to NRHP: July 28, 1994

Wrightsville and Tennille Railroad Company Building is a historic building in Tennille, Georgia. It was designed by Charles E. Choate, an architect and Methodist who worked in Tennille for many years, and constructed in 1903. The brick-and-stone structure is a late 20nth century revival of Beaux arts architecture. It was added to the National Register of Historic Places on July 28, 1994.

The Wrightsville and Tennille Railroad Company Building is now a private residence.

== See also ==
- Tennille Banking Company Building
- National Register of Historic Places listings in Washington County, Georgia
