= Tennille Banking Company Building =

Historic bank in the US state of Georgia

- U.S. National Register of Historic Places
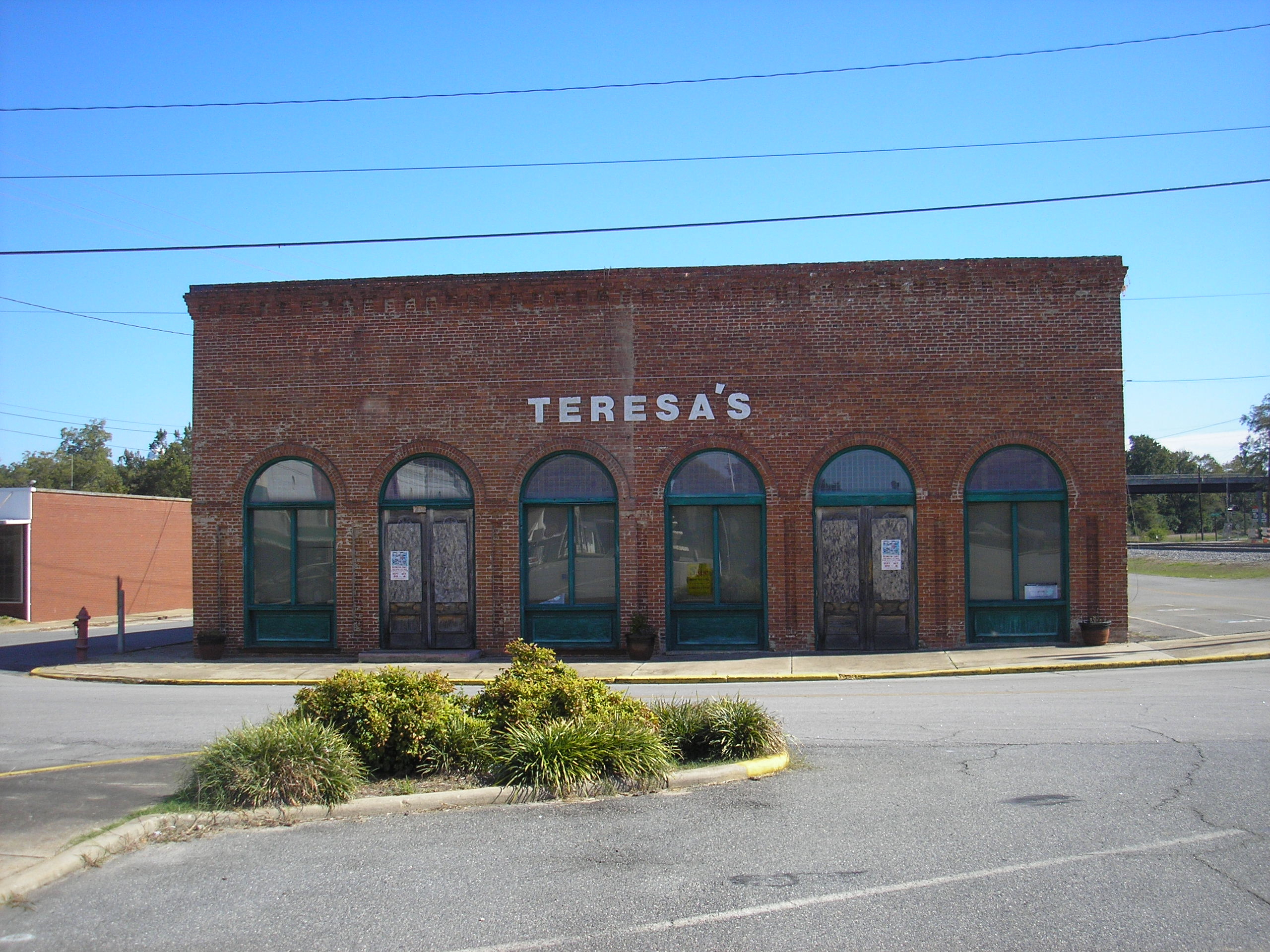

- Location within Georgia Location within the United States
- Location: 102--104 N. Main St., Tennille, Georgia
- Coordinates: 32°56′11″N 82°48′41″W
- Area: less than one acre
- Built: 1900
- Architect: Charles E. Choate
- MPS: Buildings Designed by Charles Edward Choate Constructed in Washington County MPS
- NRHP reference No.: 94000715
- Added to NRHP: July 28, 1994

Tennille Banking Company Building is a historic structure in Tennille, Georgia. It was added to the National Register of Historic Places on July 28, 1994. It is located at 102-104 North Main Street. The Tennille Banking Company opened in 1900. The building was designed by Charles E. Choate (August 31, 1865 – 1929) who lived for ten years in Tennille.

== See also ==
- Wrightsville and Tennille Railroad Company Building
- National Register of Historic Places listings in Washington County, Georgia
