= Church-Smith-Harris Street Historic District =

Historic area in Sandersville, Georgia, US

- U.S. National Register of Historic Places
- Location within Georgia
- Location: E. Church, S. Smith, and S. Harris Sts., Sandersville, Georgia
- Coordinates: 32°58′44″N 82°48′29″W
- Area: 105 acres (42 ha)
- Architectural style: Greek Revival, Tudor Revival, Queen Anne
- NRHP reference No.: 87001268
- Added to NRHP: December 31, 1987

The Church-Smith-Harris Street Historic District is a 105 acres (42 ha) historic district in Sandersville, Georgia which was listed on the National Register of Historic Places in 1987.

The district "is located just to the southeast of the city's business district, encompasses the largest grouping of historic residential structures extant in Sandersville. The great majority of the structures are of frame construction, with some masonry structures which are of 20th century construction. Architectural styles found in the district range from vernacular Greek Revival of the 1840s to Tudor style houses of the early 1930s."

It includes historic houses along E. Church and S. Smith Streets and a few on S. Harris Street.

It includes Greek Revival, Tudor Revival, and Queen Anne architecture. It included 60 contributing buildings.
