= Warthen, Georgia =

- Unincorporated community Census-designated place
- Location within Georgia
- Coordinates: 33°06′08″N 82°48′13″W
- Country: United States
- State: Georgia
- County: Washington
- Elevation: 479 ft (146 m)

Population (2020)
  - Total: 132
- Time zone: UTC-5 (Eastern (EST))
  - Summer (DST): UTC-4 (EDT)
- ZIP code: 31094
- Area code: 478
- GNIS feature ID: 342360

Warthen is an unincorporated community and census-designated place (CDP) in Washington County, Georgia, United States. The community is located at the junction of State Routes 15 and 102, 8.3 miles (13.4 km) north of Sandersville. Warthen has a post office with ZIP code 31094.

The 2020 census listed a population of 132.

== History ==
Warthen was the first settlement erected in Washington County and was founded to be the site of the superior courts and the jail for the county. Warthen was erected as a settlement in 1754. It is located in a coastal plain and once embraced territory from the Cherokee corner.

Warthen was an early holder of the Washington County county seat until the seat was transferred to Sandersville in 1796.

The Georgia General Assembly incorporated Warthen in 1812. Eventually, the community lost its charter and today it occupies an unincorporated area.

Warthen has been declared a historic site, and inscribed on the National Register of Historic Places as the Warthen Historic District.

The town of Warthen is home to the oldest hewn log jail in Georgia. This jail was once the confinement space of Aaron Burr in 1804 on his journey to Richmond, Virginia for trial concerning his charges of treason against Alexander Hamilton.

Warthen, Georgia is historically known for being part of Washington County's cotton crops. The industry of cotton brought settlers to the area and farmers raised a variety of crops. After the invention of the cotton gin, cotton became a major crop in the county.

Religion was important in the early community. Baptists and Methodist founded churches by 1865, and then Catholic and Episcopal denominations formed churches some time around 1900. Bethlehem Baptist Church is the oldest Baptist church in Washington County and was one of the first churches to be founded, with its founding taking place in 1790.

== Demographics ==
Historical population
Census	Pop.	Note	%±
2020	132		—
U.S. Decennial Census; 2020

Warthern was first listed as a census designated place in the 2020 U.S. census.

Warthen CDP, Georgia – Racial and ethnic composition Note: the US Census treats Hispanic/Latino as an ethnic category. This table excludes Latinos from the racial categories and assigns them to a separate category. Hispanics/Latinos may be of any race.
Race / Ethnicity (NH = Non-Hispanic)	Pop 2020	% 2020
White alone (NH)	47	35.61%
Black or African American alone (NH)	81	61.36%
Native American or Alaska Native alone (NH)	0	0.00%
Asian alone (NH)	0	0.00%
Pacific Islander alone (NH)	0	0.00%
Some Other Race alone (NH)	0	0.00%
Mixed Race or Multi-Racial (NH)	2	1.52%
Hispanic or Latino (any race)	2	1.52%
Total	132	100.00%

== See also ==
List of county seats in Georgia (U.S. state)
