= James Kelley House (Tennille, Georgia) =

- U.S. National Register of Historic Places
- Location within Georgia Location within the United States
- Location: Tennille-Harrison Rd. E of jct. with GA 15, Tennille, Georgia
- Coordinates: 32°55′53″N 82°48′01″W
- Area: 15 acres (6.1 ha)
- Built: 1919
- Architect: Charles E. Choate
- Architectural style: Bungalow/craftsman
- MPS: Buildings Designed by Charles Edward Choate Constructed in Washington County MPS
- NRHP reference No.: 94000712
- Added to NRHP: July 28, 1994

The James Kelley House, in Tennille, Georgia, was built in 1919. It was designed by architect Charles E. Choate. It was listed on the National Register of Historic Places in 1994. The listing included eight contributing buildings and a contributing structure on 15 acres (6.1 ha).

It is located on Tennille—Harrison Rd. east of its junction with GA 15.

The house was nominated as part of a study of Choate's works in Washington County.

James Kelley and his father Robert Kelley "were said to be the foremost farmers in the history of Washington County."
