= Washington County Courthouse (Georgia) =

- U.S. National Register of Historic Places
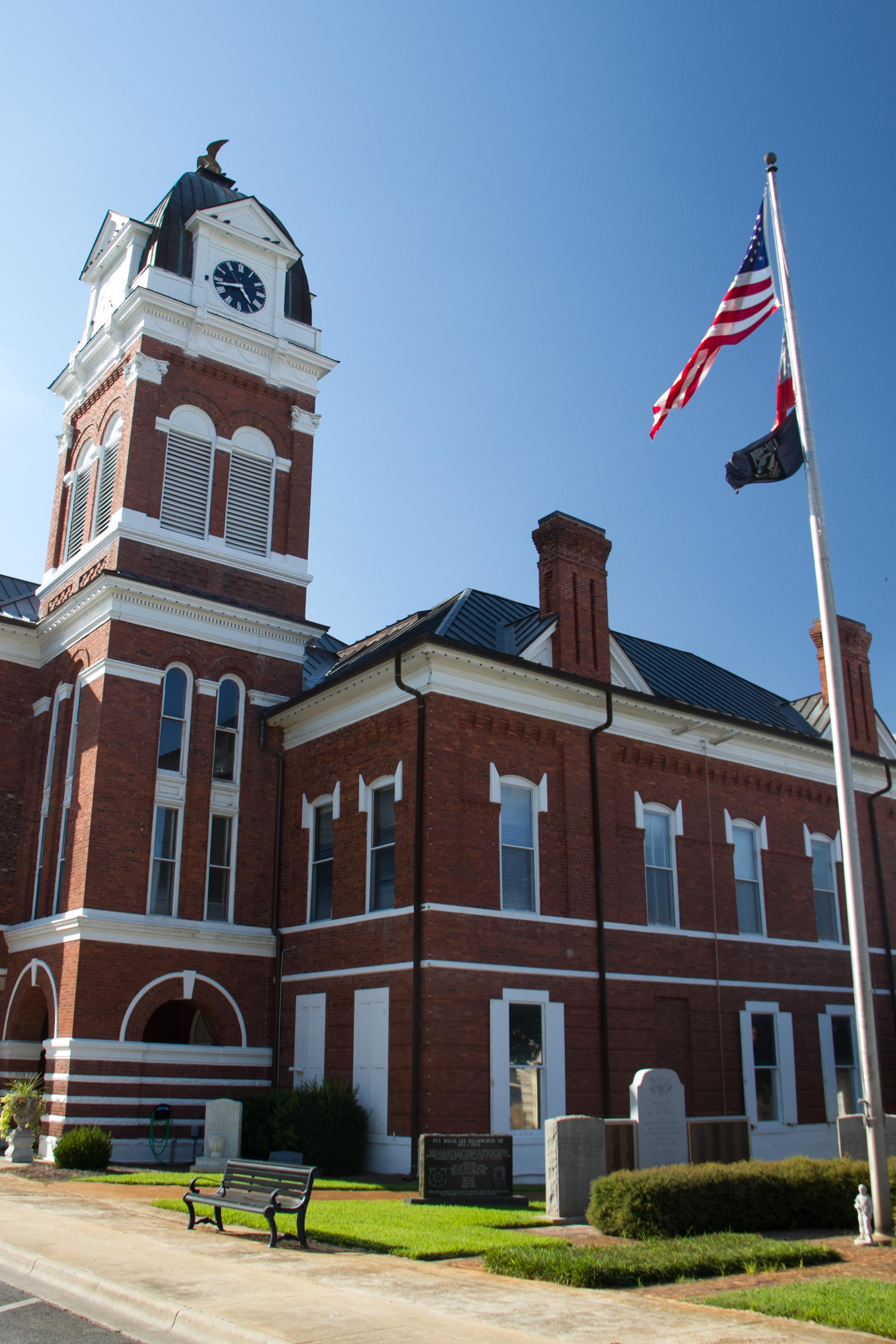

- Location within Georgia Location within the United States
- Interactive map showing the location of Washington County Courthouse
- Location: Courthouse Sq., Sandersville, Georgia
- Coordinates: 32°59′0″N 82°48′43″W
- Area: 2 acres (0.81 ha)
- Built: 1886
- Architect: Grant, Brantley & Renfroe
- Architectural style: Second Empire, High Victorian
- MPS: Georgia County Courthouses TR
- NRHP reference No.: 80001260
- Added to NRHP: September 18, 1980

Washington County Courthouse is a historic county courthouse in Sandersville, Georgia, county seat of Washington County, Georgia. It was built in 1869 and renovated in 1899 under the supervision of L.F. Goodrich. It was added to the National Register of Historic Places on September 18, 1980 and is located on Courthouse Square.

== See also ==
- National Register of Historic Places listings in Washington County, Georgia
