= Dublin and Southwestern Railroad =

The Dublin and Southwestern Railroad was founded in 1904 and began operating in 1905. Originally planned to operate between Dublin, GA and Abbeville, GA, it never got further than Eastman, GA. In 1907, the Wrightsville and Tennille Railroad acquired the property of the D&S. The ex-D&S was abandoned in 1941.
