= Dublin and Wrightsville Railroad =

Railroad in Georgia, United States

The Dublin and Wrightsville Railroad was chartered January 3, 1885 and initially opened 7.5 miles to Lovett, Georgia in October 1855. By 1886 it ran 19 miles (31 km) between the cities of Dublin and Wrightsville in the American state of Georgia. In 1886 it was acquired by the Wrightsville and Tennille Railroad.
