= Empire and Dublin Railroad =

The Empire and Dublin Railroad was a company that operated in Georgia, United States. Chartered in 1888, it completed building a road from Hawkinsville to Dublin, Georgia, in 1890. A receiver was appointed the same year.

It began by using a former logging railroad owned by the Empire Lumber Company that ran about 11 miles (18 km) between Empire and Dublin, then rebuilding and extending it to Hawkinsville.

When the Empire Lumber Company failed, the Empire and Dublin Railroad was sold at auction for $30,100, and was reorganized as the Oconee and Western Railroad in 1892.
