= North Harris Street Historic District =

Historic district in Georgia, United States

- U.S. National Register of Historic Places
- U.S. Historic district
- Location within Georgia Location within the United States
- Location: Roughly bounded by First Ave., Washington Ave., E. McCarty St., N. Harris St., Malone St., and Warthen St., Sandersville, Georgia
- Coordinates: 32°59′20″N 82°48′37″W
- Area: 60 acres (24 ha)
- Architect: Charles E. Choate; Ellamae League
- Architectural style: Late 19th and 20th Century Revivals, Greek Revival, Queen Anne
- NRHP reference No.: 89000801
- Added to NRHP: July 20, 1989

The North Harris Street Historic District is a 60 acres (24 ha) historic district which was listed on the National Register of Historic Places in 1989. It is roughly bounded by First Ave., Washington Ave., E. McCarty St., N. Harris St., Malone St., and Warthen St. in Sandersville, Georgia.

It includes works designed by architect Charles E. Choate and by his niece Ellamae Ellis League. It includes Greek Revival, Queen Anne and Late 19th and 20th Century Revivals architecture. In 1989 it included 88 contributing buildings as well as 11 non-contributing buildings and a non-contributing site.

Architect Ellamae Ellis League designed one or more contributing buildings in the district which were built in the late 1930s. (Note: The NRHP nomination document mentions League having designed homes in the plural, but is ambiguous as to which ones those are. It clearly identifies the Leonard House as having been designed by her, and implies but is not clear whether she designed the Neo-classical Holt-Halton House at 239 N. Harris and the Craftsman style house at 319 Warthen (see #24 in accompanying photos).) She designed the Leonard House (1939), at 213 N. Harris, a one-story brick Colonial Revival style house featuring "paired end chimneys, a parapet roof and an accentuated front door entry." The doorway has a "decorative crown" and "slender columns set in-antis."
