= First Methodist Episcopal Church (Stillmore, Georgia) =

Historic church in Georgia, United States

- U.S. National Register of Historic Places
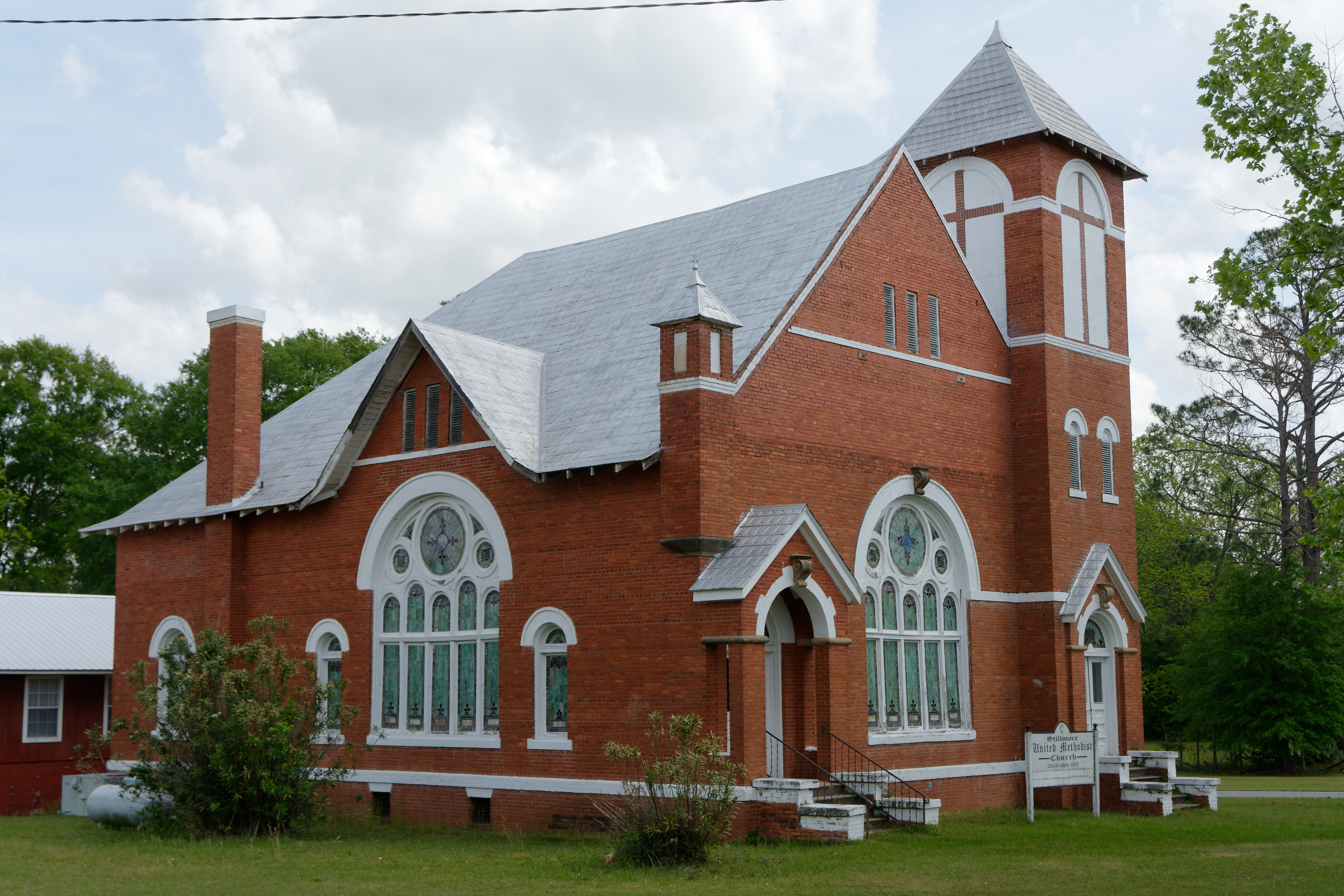
- The church in 2017

- Location within Georgia Location within the United States
- Location: Jct. of Third Ave. and Third St., Stillmore, Georgia
- Coordinates: 32.44127°N 82.21375°W
- Area: 1.5 acres (0.61 ha)
- Built: 1907, 1916
- Architect: Charles Edward Choate
- Architectural style: Romanesque Revival
- NRHP reference No.: 99000160
- Added to NRHP: February 12, 1999

The First Methodist Episcopal Church in Stillmore, Georgia, also known as Stillmore United Methodist Church and as Stillmore Methodist Episcopal Church South, was built in 1907. A fire on December 15, 1915, destroyed all but the exterior walls of the church, and in 1916 it was rebuilt to the original plans with minor exception. It was listed on the National Register of Historic Places in 1999.

It was designed by architect Charles Edward Choate in Romanesque Revival style. The 1907 church and parsonage cost $7,500; their reconstruction in 1916 cost $10,000. The church was deemed "an excellent example of the early work of Charles Edward Choate" and "an excellent example of the use of the Romanesque Revival style in Georgia."

The parsonage was sold by the church in 1994; it was moved to a new location but was later dismantled and its materials were incorporated into a new house.
