= Dawson Woman's Club =

- Dawson Woman's Clubhouse
- Formerly listed on the U.S. National Register of Historic Places
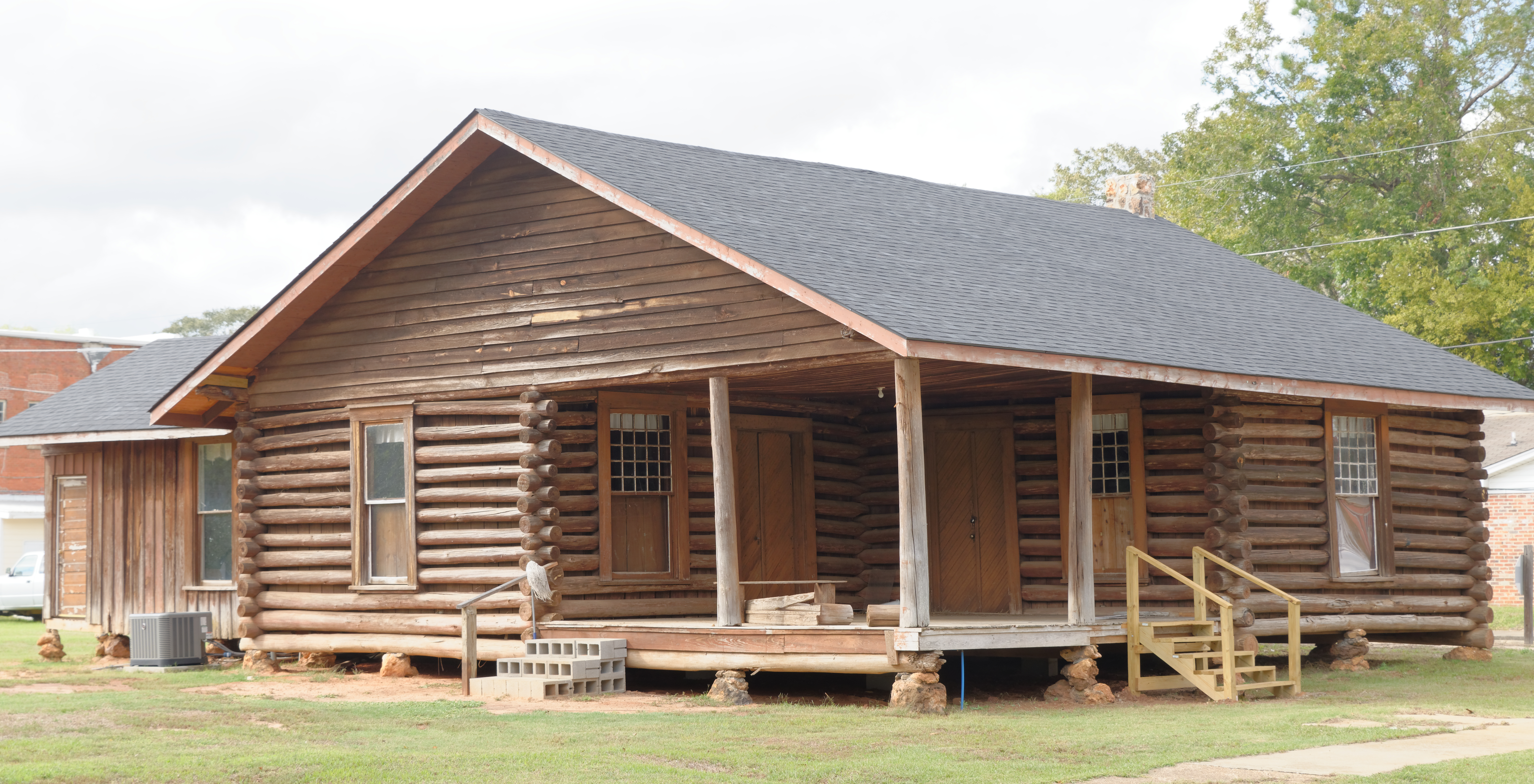
- Dawson Woman's Clubhouse photo from October 2018

- Location within Georgia
- Location: 360 6th Avenue, NE, Dawson, Georgia, but located at 7th Ave and Stonewall St as of 2018
- Coordinates: 31.77545°N 84.44561°W
- Area: 0.3 acres (0.12 ha)
- Built: 1913
- Built by: Shields and Geise
- Architectural style: Log Cabin
- NRHP reference No.: 82002484

Significant dates
- Added to NRHP: June 17, 1982
- Removed from NRHP: October 31, 2019

The Dawson Woman's Club was founded in 1905 as the "Wednesday Afternoon Club" and became a member of the Georgia Federation of Women's Clubs in 1907.

The Dawson Woman's Clubhouse, in Dawson, Georgia, is a log cabin structure which was built in 1913. It was listed on the National Register of Historic Places in 1982, and was delisted in 2019 because it had been moved. (Note: It was listed with address reported as 311 6th Ave. in Dawson. Google Streetview imagery dated June 2013 shows the building at the address 360 6th Avenue, NE. The addresses may have been renumbered.) As of 2018, it had been moved to the southwest corner of 7th Avenue and Stonewall Street.

The building is a log cabin built for public use, made "of round, saddle-notched, unchinked logs that rest on a primitive pier foundation composed of stacked fieldstones."

The building is now known as the Log Cabin Club House, and is offered for rent for events. It was for some time located at 360 6th Avenue, NE, in Dawson.

The woman's club became inactive by 1950, and was reorganized as the Dawson Woman's Garden Club or Dawson Garden Club. According to the Terrell County Historic Preservation Society, "community improvement has continued to be a goal, although limited to the area of city beautification."

The house belonged to the Dawson Garden Club from 1950 to 1994, when it was transferred to the Dawson Restoration Society (now the Terrell County Historic Preservation Society).

== See also ==
- Tennille Woman's Clubhouse, Tennille, Georgia, also a log building, currently NRHP-listed
