= Warthen Historic District =

Historic district in Georgia, United States

- U.S. National Register of Historic Places
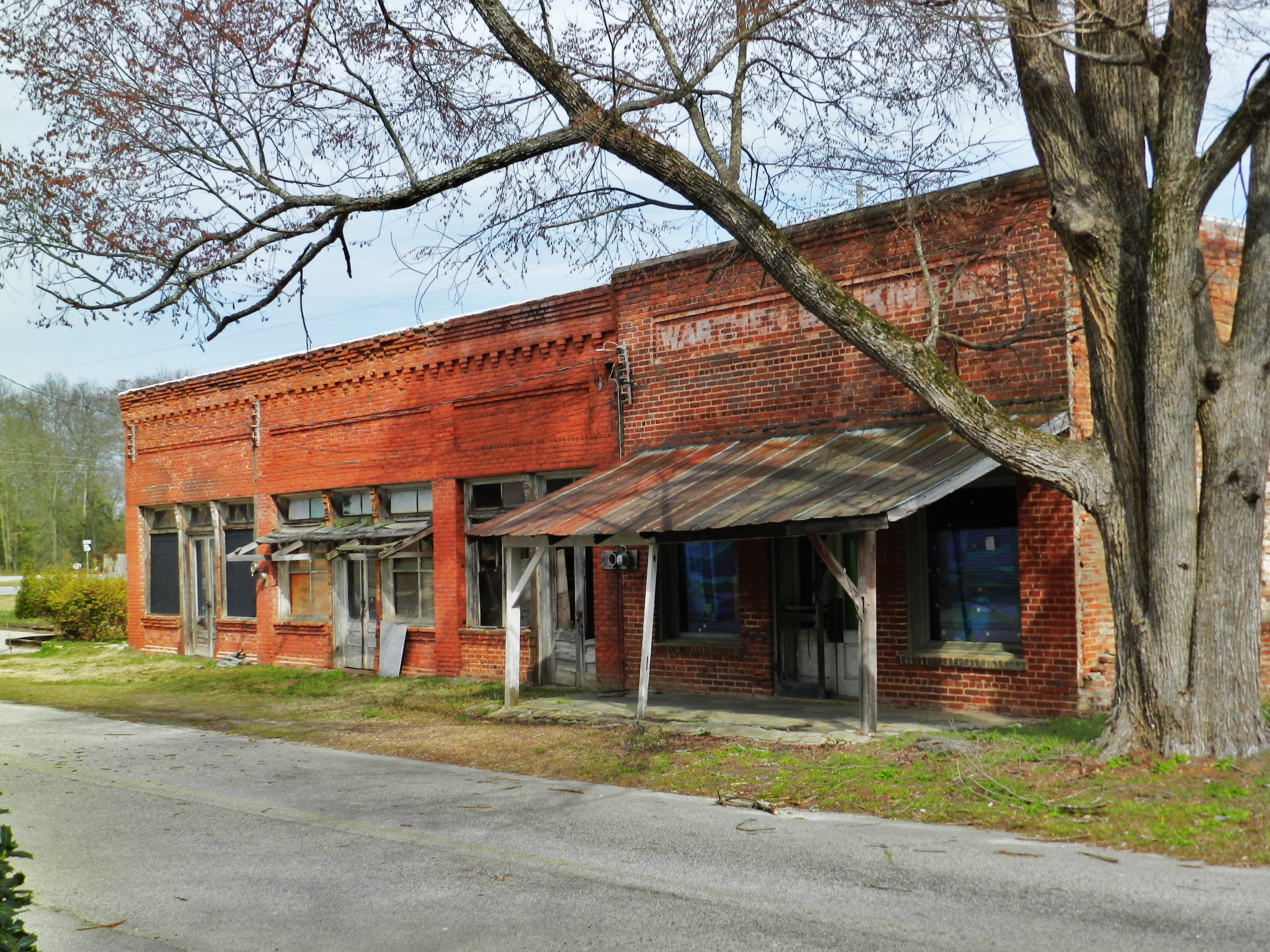
- Abandoned storefronts in 2013

- Location within Georgia
- Location: Jct. of GA 15, GA 102, Warthen St., Old Sadersville-Sparta and Walker Dairy Rds., Warthen, Georgia
- Coordinates: 33°06′12″N 82°48′18″W
- Area: 245 acres (99 ha)
- Built: 1783
- Built by: multiple
- Architect: multiple
- Architectural style: Greek Revival, Queen Anne, Colonial Revival
- NRHP reference No.: 97000755
- Added to NRHP: July 25, 1997

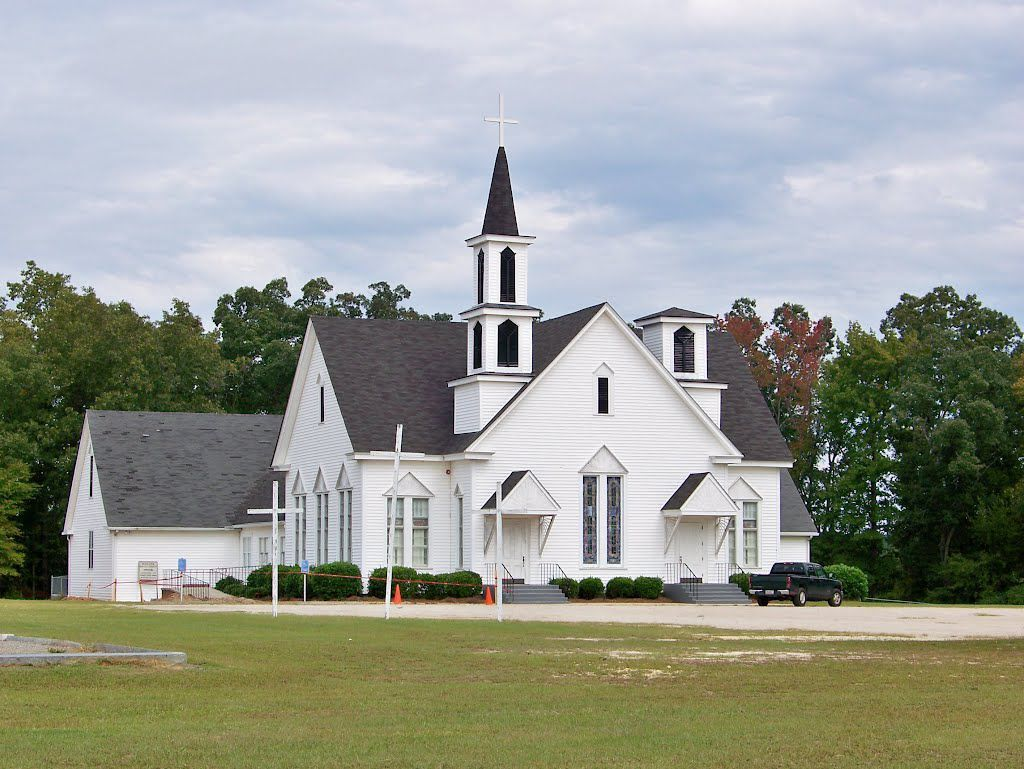
Bethlehem Baptist Church

The Warthen Historic District is a 245 acres (99 ha) historic district in Warthen, Georgia which was listed on the National Register of Historic Places in 1997. The listing included 39 contributing buildings and 2 contributing sites. It includes the junction of Georgia State Route 15, Georgia State Route 102, Warthen St., Old Sadersville-Sparta and Walker Dairy Roads.

It includes Greek Revival, Queen Anne, and Colonial Revival architecture.

It includes the Warthen Jail, built c.1873, "significant as one of the oldest known jails and as one of the oldest intact buildings in Georgia. It is also significant for its log construction with hand-hewn logs."
