= Deepstep Creek =

Stream in Georgia, U.S.

Coordinates: 32°59′58″N 82°58′14″W

Deepstep Creek is a stream in the U.S. state of Georgia.

Deepstep Creek was so named on account of steep banks along its course.
