= Charles Edward Choate =

American architect

Charles E. Choate (August 31, 1865 – November 16, 1929) was a U.S. architect who worked in Georgia, Florida, and Alabama. He designed numerous buildings that are listed on the U.S. National Register of Historic Places.

He was born Charles Edward on August 31, 1865, in Houston County, Georgia. He studied at the University of Georgia. His niece was Macon architect Ellamae Ellis League. He died in Maysville, Kentucky in 1929.

== Works ==
His works include:

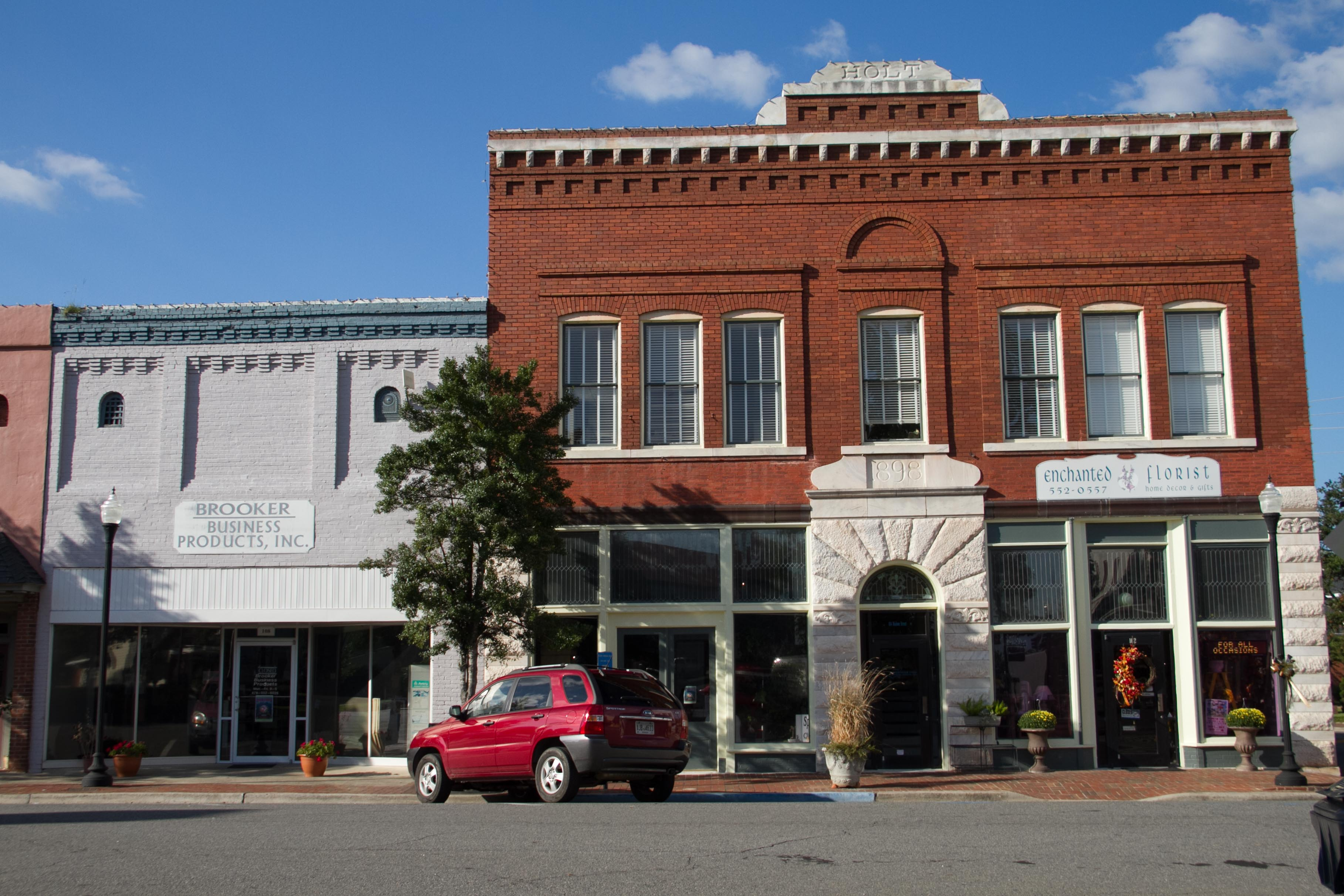
Holt Brothers Banking Company Building

- First Methodist Episcopal Church (1907), junction of Third Ave. and Third St., Stillmore, Georgia, NRHP-listed
- Holt Brothers Banking Company Building, 100-106 Malone St., Sandersville, GA, NRHP-listed
- James E. Johnson House, 425 W. Church St., Sandersville, GA, NRHP-listed
- James Kelley House, Tennille-Harrison Rd. E of jct. with GA 15, Tennille, GA, NRHP-listed
- Charles Madden House, 302 E. South Central St., Tennille, GA
- Park Street Methodist Episcopal Church, South, 793 Park St., SW., Atlanta, GA, NRHP-listed
- Ferdinand A. Ricks House, S. Collins and E. Calhoun Sts., Reynolds, GA, NRHP-listed
- Thomas W. Smith House, 306 N. Main St., Tennille, GA, NRHP-listed

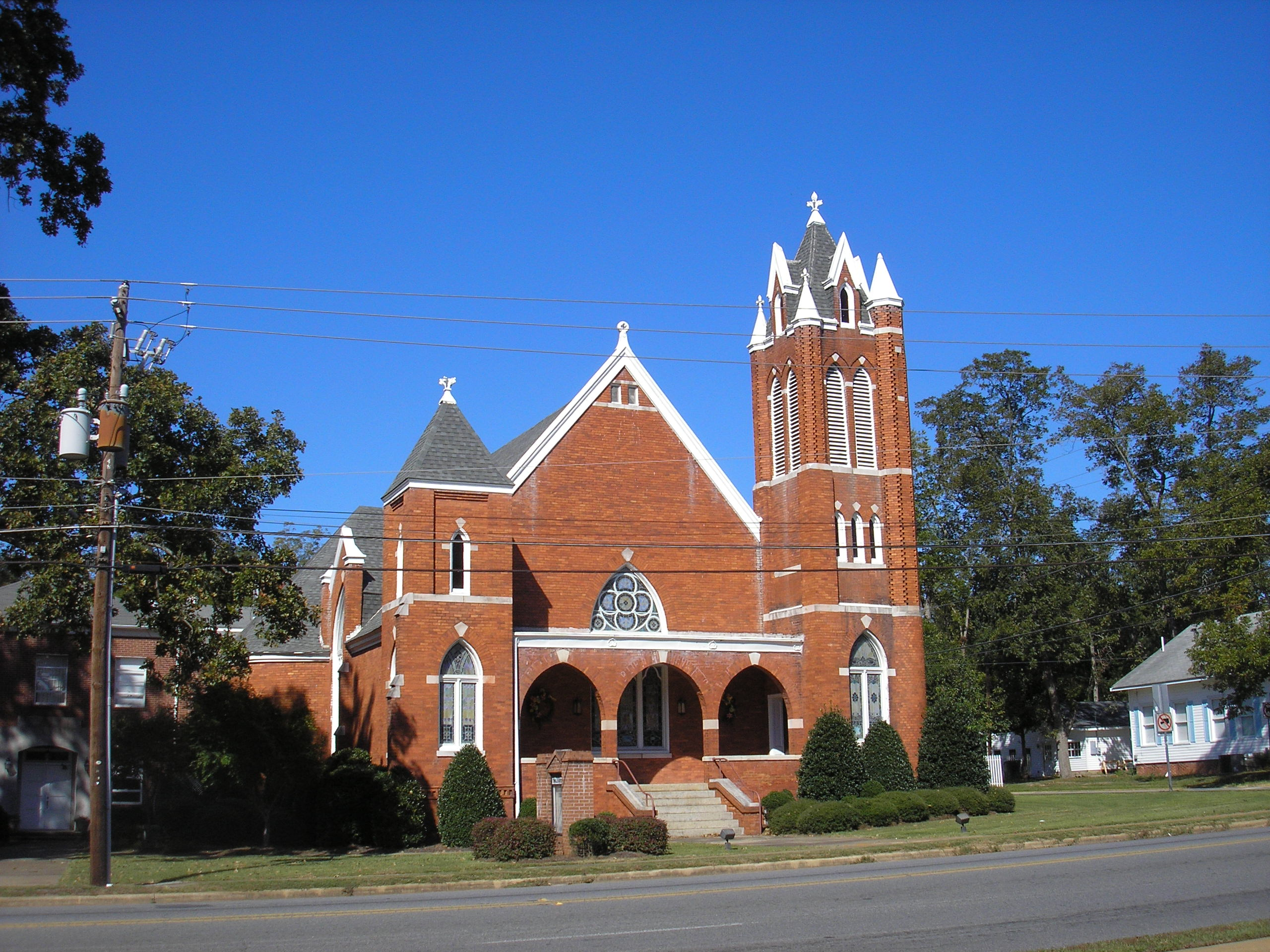
Tennille Baptist Church

- Tennille Banking Company Building, 102-104 N. Main St., Tennille, GA, NRHP-listed
- Tennille Baptist Church, 201-205 N. Main St., Tennille, GA, NRHP-listed
- Washington Manufacturing Company, Between E. Montgomery and Church Sts. at White Line St., Tennille, GA, NRHP-listed
- Wrightsville and Tennille Railroad Company Building, 119 Central Ave., Tennille, GA, NRHP-listed
- Three contributing buildings in North Harris Street Historic District, roughly bounded by First Ave., Washington Ave., E. McCarty St., N. Harris St., Malone St., and Warthen St., Sandersville, GA, NRHP-listed
