= Deepstep, Georgia =

- Town
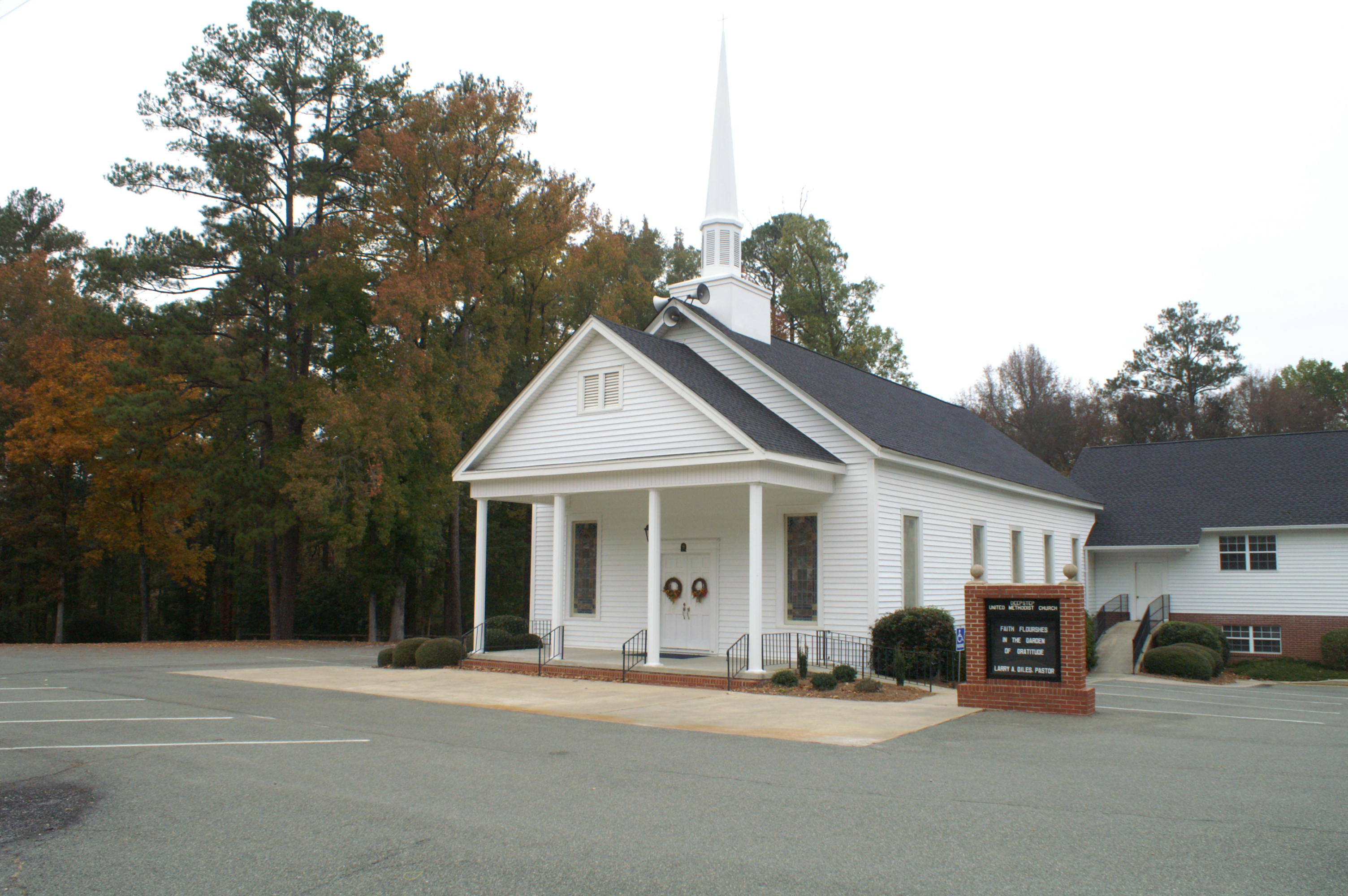
- The United Methodist Church traces its origin to 1805

- Location in Washington County and the state of Georgia
- Coordinates: 33°1′19″N 82°58′6″W
- Country: United States
- State: Georgia
- County: Washington

Government
  - Type: Mayor-council government
  - Mayor: Randall Veal
  - City Council: Five members

Area
  - Total: 0.88 sq mi (2.29 km^{2})
  - Land: 0.87 sq mi (2.26 km^{2})
  - Water: 0.069 sq mi (0.18 km^{2})
- Elevation: 312 ft (95 m)

Population (2020)
  - Total: 117
  - Density: 143.4/sq mi (55.38/km^{2})
- Time zone: UTC-5 (Eastern (EST))
  - Summer (DST): UTC-4 (EDT)
- ZIP code: 31082
- Area code: 478
- FIPS code: 13-22108
- GNIS feature ID: 0331534

Deepstep is a town in Washington County, Georgia, United States. The population was 117 in 2020.

== History ==
A post office called Deepstep was established in 1886. The Georgia General Assembly incorporated the place in 1900 as the "Town of Deepstep". The town is named after Deepstep Creek.

== Geography ==
Deepstep is located at 33°1′19″N 82°58′6″W (33.021827, -82.968337). According to the United States Census Bureau, the town has a total area of 0.88 square miles (2.3 km^{2}), of which 0.873 square miles (2.26 km^{2}) is land and 0.07 square miles (0.18 km^{2}) (2.53%) is water.

== Demographics ==
Historical population
Census	Pop.	Note	%±
1910	149		—
1920	184		23.5%
1930	180		−2.2%
1940	174		−3.3%
1950	159		−8.6%
1960	139		−12.6%
1970	107		−23.0%
1980	120		12.1%
1990	111		−7.5%
2000	132		18.9%
2010	131		−0.8%
2020	117		−10.7%
U.S. Decennial Census

As of the census of 2000, there were 132 people, 54 households, and 40 families residing in the town. By 2020, its population was 117.

== See also ==
- Central Savannah River Area
