= Tennille, Georgia =

- City
- Location in Washington County and the state of Georgia
- Coordinates: 32°56′17″N 82°48′38″W
- Country: United States
- State: Georgia
- County: Washington

Area
  - Total: 1.78 sq mi (4.62 km^{2})
  - Land: 1.77 sq mi (4.59 km^{2})
  - Water: 0.015 sq mi (0.04 km^{2})
- Elevation: 466 ft (142 m)

Population (2020)
  - Total: 1,469
  - Density: 829.5/sq mi (320.29/km^{2})
- Time zone: UTC-5 (Eastern (EST))
  - Summer (DST): UTC-4 (EDT)
- ZIP code: 31089
- Area code: 478
- FIPS code: 13-75888
- GNIS feature ID: 0324005
- Website: https://www.tennille-ga.gov/

Tennille is a city in Washington County, Georgia, United States. The population was 1,469 in 2020. It is considered a suburb of Sandersville.

== History ==
The Georgia General Assembly incorporated Tennille in 1875. The community was named after Francis Tennille, an early settler.

== Geography ==
Tennille is located at 32°56′17″N 82°48′38″W (32.938174, -82.810582).

According to the United States Census Bureau, the city has a total area of 1.7 square miles (4.4 km^{2}), of which 1.7 square miles (4.4 km^{2}) is land and 0.58% is water.

== Demographics ==
Historical population
| Census | Pop. | Note | %± |
|---|---|---|---|
| 1880 | 99 | | — |
| 1890 | 953 | | 862.6% |
| 1900 | 1,121 | | 17.6% |
| 1910 | 1,622 | | 44.7% |
| 1920 | 1,768 | | 9.0% |
| 1930 | 1,666 | | −5.8% |
| 1940 | 1,758 | | 5.5% |
| 1950 | 1,713 | | −2.6% |
| 1960 | 1,837 | | 7.2% |
| 1970 | 1,753 | | −4.6% |
| 1980 | 1,709 | | −2.5% |
| 1990 | 1,552 | | −9.2% |
| 2000 | 1,505 | | −3.0% |
| 2010 | 1,539 | | 2.3% |
| 2020 | 1,469 | | −4.5% |
| 2023 (est.) | 1,825 | ▲ | 24.2% |
U.S. Decennial Census; 1850-1870 1870-1880; 1890-1910 1920-1930; 1940 1950 1960; 1970 1980 1990; 2000 2010

=== Racial and ethnic composition ===
Tennille city, Georgia – Racial and ethnic composition Note: the US Census treats Hispanic/Latino as an ethnic category. This table excludes Latinos from the racial categories and assigns them to a separate category. Hispanics/Latinos may be of any race.
| Race / Ethnicity (NH = Non-Hispanic) | Pop 2010 | Pop 2020 | % 2010 | % 2020 |
|---|---|---|---|---|
| White alone (NH) | 519 | 421 | 33.72% | 28.66% |
| Black or African American alone (NH) | 966 | 987 | 62.77% | 67.19% |
| Native American or Alaska Native alone (NH) | 2 | 6 | 0.13% | 0.41% |
| Asian alone (NH) | 9 | 3 | 0.58% | 0.20% |
| Pacific Islander alone (NH) | 0 | 0 | 0.00% | 0.00% |
| Some Other Race alone (NH) | 0 | 4 | 0.00% | 0.27% |
| Mixed Race or Multi-Racial (NH) | 24 | 30 | 1.56% | 2.04% |
| Hispanic or Latino (any race) | 19 | 18 | 1.23% | 1.23% |
| Total | 1,539 | 1,469 | 100.00% | 100.00% |

=== 2020 census ===
As of the 2020 census, Tennille had a population of 1,469. The median age was 36.4 years. 27.4% of residents were under the age of 18 and 18.9% of residents were 65 years of age or older. For every 100 females there were 77.0 males, and for every 100 females age 18 and over there were 67.1 males age 18 and over.

96.2% of residents lived in urban areas, while 3.8% lived in rural areas.

There were 583 households in Tennille, of which 36.0% had children under the age of 18 living in them. Of all households, 24.9% were married-couple households, 17.7% were households with a male householder and no spouse or partner present, and 49.9% were households with a female householder and no spouse or partner present. About 31.4% of all households were made up of individuals and 16.1% had someone living alone who was 65 years of age or older.

There were 704 housing units, of which 17.2% were vacant. The homeowner vacancy rate was 2.4% and the rental vacancy rate was 7.1%.

== Notable people ==
Charles E. Choate, an architect whose works are listed on the National Register of Historic Places, resided at Tennille.

Jack Carroll Massey (June 15, 1904 – February 15, 1990) was an American venture capitalist and entrepreneur who owned Kentucky Fried Chicken, co-founded the Hospital Corporation of America, and owned one of the largest franchisees of Wendy's. He was the first American businessman to take three different companies public. Born in Tennille.

== See also ==
- Central Savannah River Area
