= Sandersville, Georgia =

- City
- Flag Seal
- Nickname: Kaolin Capital of the World
- Location in Washington County and the state of Georgia
- Coordinates: 32°58′55″N 82°48′35″W
- Country: United States
- State: Georgia
- County: Washington
- Founded: 1796
- Incorporated: 1812

Government
  - Type: Council-Mayor
  - Mayor: James W. Andrews

Area
  - Total: 12.99 sq mi (33.65 km^{2})
  - Land: 12.87 sq mi (33.34 km^{2})
  - Water: 0.12 sq mi (0.32 km^{2})
- Elevation: 446 ft (136 m)

Population (2020)
  - Total: 5,813
  - Density: 451.6/sq mi (174.38/km^{2})
- Time zone: UTC-5 (Eastern (EST))
  - Summer (DST): UTC-4 (EDT)
- ZIP code: 31082
- Area code: 478
- FIPS code: 13-68208
- GNIS feature ID: 0322445
- Website: www.sandersvillega.org

Sandersville is a city in and the county seat of Washington County, Georgia, United States. The population was 5,813 in 2020. It is also a part of the Central Savannah River Area. Sandersville is known as the "Kaolin Capital of the World" due to its abundance of kaolin.

== History ==
Established by British settlers in Creek territory in the 18th century, shortly after the American Revolution, the town of Sandersville became the county seat of Washington County in 1796. Creek leaders had not yet ceded their territory when Sandersville was settled. According to a book on Georgia place names, the city was named after M. Saunders, a local store owner. The settlement was located at an intersection of Native American Indian trails, and later the site of Saunders' general store.

The town appears on Anthony Finley's 1827 map of Georgia.

In 1864, during the Civil War, General William T. Sherman skirmished and then paused in Sandersville during his March to the Sea. Brief resistance to the advancing Union forces was centered on the courthouse. As they left, Sherman's troops burned both it and the jail, but left the rest of the town intact. A new Washington County Courthouse was built in 1869.

The Sandersville Railroad was built in 1893 as a part of the Central of Georgia Railway, but still operates today as a privately owned shortline that connects to Norfolk Southern Railway's Georgia Division Savannah District at Tennille, Georgia, 4 miles to the south.

According to the U.S. National Archive, Nation of Islam leader Elijah Muhammad grew up in Sandersville in the 1890s and 1900s. He is reported to have said that, in Sandersville, he witnessed three lynchings before the age of 10.

== Geography ==
According to the United States Census Bureau, the city has a total area of 10.45 square kilometres (4.03 sq mi), of which 9.1 square miles (24 km^{2}) is land and 0.1 square miles (0.26 km^{2}) (0.87%) is water. The area is along the "Fall Line" that separates the Piedmont Plateau and the Atlantic Coastal Plain and is characterized by rolling hills, red clay, pine and hardwood forest, swamplands, and sand beds. The area tapers off from north to south and becomes more flat. Heading north it becomes more hilly with higher elevations.

=== Climate ===
Climate data for Sandersville, Georgia, 1991–2020 normals, extremes 1914–present
Month	Jan	Feb	Mar	Apr	May	Jun	Jul	Aug	Sep	Oct	Nov	Dec	Year
Record high °F (°C)	82 (28)	85 (29)	90 (32)	94 (34)	98 (37)	107 (42)	109 (43)	102 (39)	102 (39)	99 (37)	87 (31)	83 (28)	109 (43)
Mean maximum °F (°C)	73.5 (23.1)	76.9 (24.9)	83.4 (28.6)	86.7 (30.4)	91.4 (33.0)	95.7 (35.4)	97.6 (36.4)	96.9 (36.1)	92.7 (33.7)	86.3 (30.2)	79.8 (26.6)	75.0 (23.9)	98.7 (37.1)
Mean daily maximum °F (°C)	57.9 (14.4)	61.3 (16.3)	68.7 (20.4)	76.0 (24.4)	83.1 (28.4)	88.5 (31.4)	91.6 (33.1)	89.9 (32.2)	85.0 (29.4)	76.3 (24.6)	66.9 (19.4)	59.7 (15.4)	75.4 (24.1)
Daily mean °F (°C)	46.3 (7.9)	49.0 (9.4)	55.8 (13.2)	63.0 (17.2)	71.0 (21.7)	77.8 (25.4)	81.3 (27.4)	80.0 (26.7)	74.8 (23.8)	64.6 (18.1)	54.5 (12.5)	48.4 (9.1)	63.9 (17.7)
Mean daily minimum °F (°C)	34.7 (1.5)	36.7 (2.6)	42.8 (6.0)	50.0 (10.0)	58.8 (14.9)	67.2 (19.6)	70.9 (21.6)	70.0 (21.1)	64.5 (18.1)	52.9 (11.6)	42.1 (5.6)	37.2 (2.9)	52.3 (11.3)
Mean minimum °F (°C)	19.0 (−7.2)	22.7 (−5.2)	28.3 (−2.1)	36.0 (2.2)	45.7 (7.6)	58.6 (14.8)	64.2 (17.9)	62.3 (16.8)	52.3 (11.3)	37.7 (3.2)	28.8 (−1.8)	23.9 (−4.5)	17.0 (−8.3)
Record low °F (°C)	−3 (−19)	7 (−14)	14 (−10)	26 (−3)	36 (2)	45 (7)	50 (10)	55 (13)	35 (2)	24 (−4)	18 (−8)	4 (−16)	−3 (−19)
Average precipitation inches (mm)	4.40 (112)	4.13 (105)	4.83 (123)	3.25 (83)	3.16 (80)	4.29 (109)	4.41 (112)	5.14 (131)	4.49 (114)	3.07 (78)	2.88 (73)	4.56 (116)	48.61 (1,236)
Average snowfall inches (cm)	0.0 (0.0)	0.4 (1.0)	0.0 (0.0)	0.0 (0.0)	0.0 (0.0)	0.0 (0.0)	0.0 (0.0)	0.0 (0.0)	0.0 (0.0)	0.0 (0.0)	0.0 (0.0)	0.1 (0.25)	0.5 (1.25)
Average precipitation days (≥ 0.01 in)	9.9	8.8	8.5	7.3	7.5	10.3	10.4	10.1	7.5	6.7	6.5	9.2	102.7
Average snowy days (≥ 0.1 in)	0.0	0.2	0.0	0.0	0.0	0.0	0.0	0.0	0.0	0.0	0.0	0.0	0.2
Source 1: NOAA
Source 2: National Weather Service

== Demographics ==
Historical population
Census	Pop.	Note	%±
1880	1,279		—
1890	1,760		37.6%
1900	2,023		14.9%
1910	2,641		30.5%
1920	2,695		2.0%
1930	3,011		11.7%
1940	3,566		18.4%
1950	4,480		25.6%
1960	5,425		21.1%
1970	5,546		2.2%
1980	6,137		10.7%
1990	6,290		2.5%
2000	6,144		−2.3%
2010	5,912		−3.8%
2020	5,813		−1.7%
U.S. Decennial Census; 1850-1870 1870-1880; 1890-1910 1920-1930; 1940 1950 1960; 1970 1980 1990; 2000 2010

=== 2020 census ===
As of the 2020 census, there were 5,813 people, 2,213 households, and 1,425 families residing in the city. The median age was 40.8 years. 25.0% of residents were under the age of 18 and 20.5% of residents were 65 years of age or older. For every 100 females there were 79.9 males, and for every 100 females age 18 and over there were 75.2 males age 18 and over.

90.7% of residents lived in urban areas, while 9.3% lived in rural areas.

Of all households, 30.9% had children under the age of 18 living in them. 29.2% were married-couple households, 17.5% were households with a male householder and no spouse or partner present, and 47.7% were households with a female householder and no spouse or partner present. About 34.1% of all households were made up of individuals, and 16.8% had someone living alone who was 65 years of age or older.

There were 2,671 housing units, of which 11.0% were vacant. The homeowner vacancy rate was 2.8% and the rental vacancy rate was 3.5%.

Sandersville racial composition 2020
Race	Num.	Perc.
White	1,861	32.01%
Black or African American	3,675	63.22%
Native American	3	0.05%
Asian	32	0.55%
Other/Mixed	132	2.27%
Hispanic or Latino	110	1.89%

== Economy ==
The economy of Sandersville was based on agriculture, particularly cotton, for many years. In the 1950s, an industry developed based on the mining and processing of kaolin found in the area. Sandersville is home to the Sandersville Railroad.

== Education ==
=== Washington County School District ===
The Washington County School District holds pre-school to grade twelve, and consists of a primary and elementary school, a middle school, and a high school. The district has 220 full-time teachers and over 3,821 students.

- Ridge Road Primary School
- Ridge Road Elementary School
- T. J. Elder Middle School
- Washington County High School

=== Private education ===
- Brentwood School (grades K-3 through 12)

=== Higher education ===
- Oconee Fall Line Technical College- Main Campus [North Campus ]
- Georgia Military College- Extension Centre

== Sports ==
Sandersville was home to the minor league baseball teams, the Sandersville Giants (1955–1956) and Sandersville Wacos (1953–1954). Sandersville played in the Class D Georgia State League (GSL) from 1953 to 1956 and played at Sandersville Baseball Park. Baseball Hall of Fame inductee Willie McCovey played for the Sandersville Giants in 1955. The team folded along with the Georgia State League following the 1956 season. Sandersville was an affiliate of the Milwaukee Braves (1953) and New York Giants (1955–1956).

== Newspaper ==
Sandersville has two newspapers: The Sandersville Progress and "The Spotlight". They both are published weekly. The Sandersville Progress began publication in 1870.

== Notable people ==
- Nathan Deal, 82nd Governor of Georgia
- Doris Duke, soul singer
- Robert Edwards, professional football player
- Terrence Edwards, professional football player
- Thomas W. Hardwick, lawyer and 63rd Governor of Georgia
- Herbert Jefferson Jr., actor
- Marvin Lane, professional baseball player
- Greg Minor, professional basketball player
- Elijah Muhammad, Leader of the Nation of Islam
- Takeo Spikes, professional football player
- Coot Veal, professional baseball player
- Allisha Gray, professional basketball player and Olympic gold medalist

== See also ==
- Central Savannah River Area hometown of Private Willie Duckworth Inventor of the military cadence
