= Shirley Hills =

Shirley Hills may refer to:

- Shirley Hills, Croydon, south London, a wooded area that includes the Addington Hills
- Shirley Hills Historic District, Macon, Georgia, United States
