= Ingleside Historic District =

Historic district in Georgia, United States

- U.S. National Register of Historic Places
- U.S. Historic district
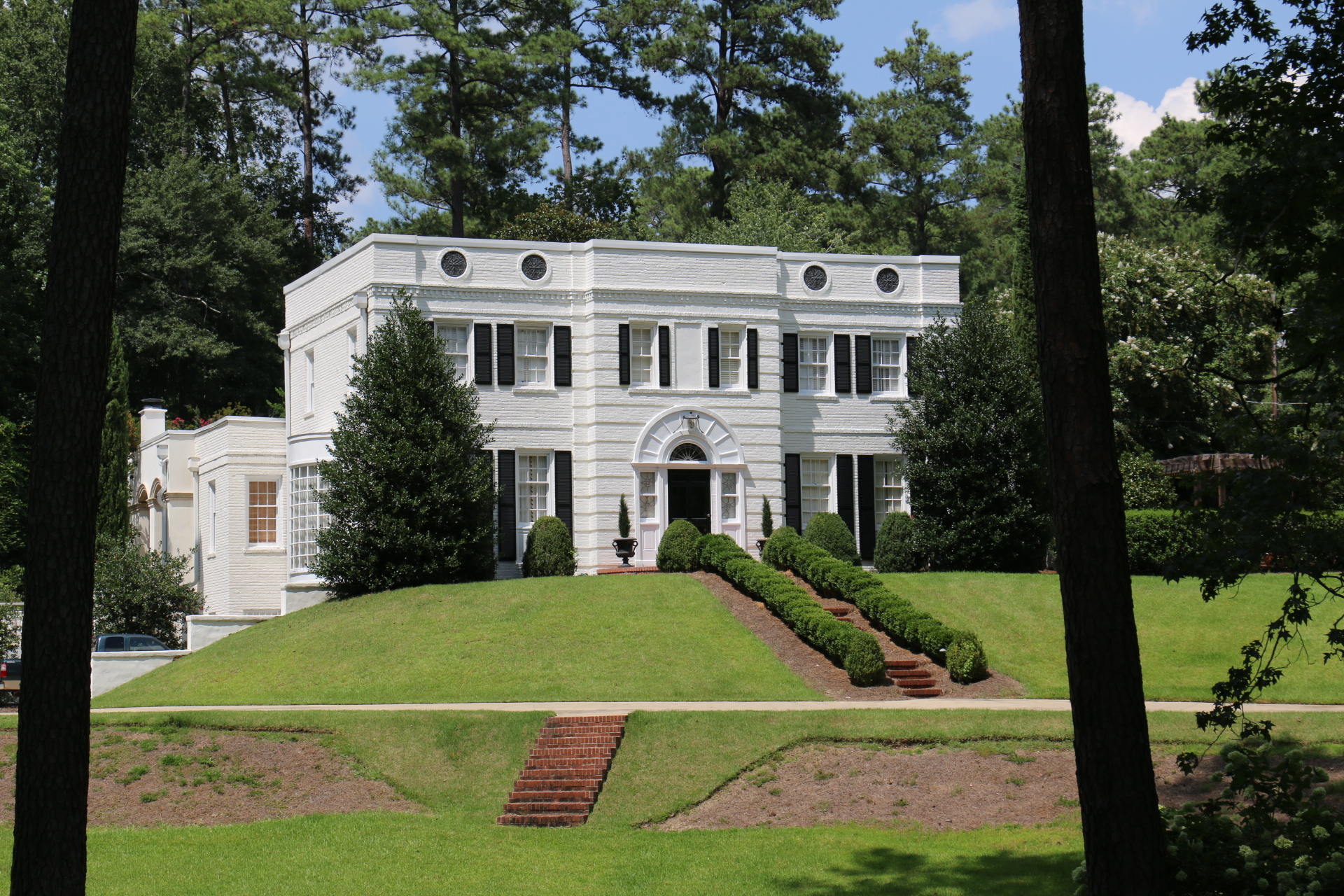
- 3192 Vista Circle

- Location within Georgia Location within the United States
- Location: Roughly bounded by Vineville Ave, Candler Dr, Bonita Pl, High Point Rd, and Forest Hill Rd., Macon
- Coordinates: 32.857132°N 83.679464°W
- Area: 549 acres (2.22 km^{2})
- Architect: Ellamae Ellis League, others
- NRHP reference No.: 16000231
- Added to NRHP: May 10, 2016

The Ingleside Historic District is a planned neighborhood and a historic district in Macon, Georgia, United States, which was listed on the National Register of Historic Places in 2016.

About 549 acres (2.22 km^{2}) in area, in 2016 it included 641 contributing buildings, four contributing structures, and two contributing sites, as well as 115 non-contributing buildings.

Architects W. Elliott Dunwody, Jackson Holliday, Ellamae Ellis League, Harry A. MacEwen, William F. Oliphant, Neel Reid, and Bernard A. Webb each designed one or more works in the district. The neighborhood itself was designed by civil engineers E.L. Gostin and S.R. Shi and landscape architect J.L. Hoffman.

Ellamae Ellis League designed a 1948 addition to the Tudor Revival 1932 Alexander School No. IV, at 3769 Ridge Avenue. The addition is contemporary in style and has long banks of windows consistent with the International Style. She also designed 3359 Osborne Place (1955-1956), 3395 Osborne Place (1940 & 1955), 3396 Osborne Place (1950s), 3180 Ingleside Avenue (1964-1965), and other works on Ridge Avenue, Riverdale Drive, and Vista Circle.
