= Porterdale Historic District =

Historic district in Georgia, United States

- U.S. National Register of Historic Places
- U.S. Historic district
- Location within Georgia Location within the United States
- Location: Roughly the city limits of Porterdale north of Elm St., Porterdale, Georgia
- Coordinates: 33°34′23″N 83°53′45″W
- Area: 525 acres (212 ha)
- Built: 1871
- Architectural style: Colonial Revival, Late Gothic Revival, other
- NRHP reference No.: 01000974
- Added to NRHP: September 17, 2001

The Porterdale Historic District in Porterdale, Georgia is a 525 acres (212 ha) historic district which was listed on the National Register of Historic Places in 2001. Its area is roughly the city limits of Porterdale north of Elm St., and it includes Colonial Revival, Late Gothic Revival, and other architecture. In 2001 it included 496 contributing buildings and eight contributing structures. It also included 37 non-contributing buildings and a non-contributing object.

It includes three mill complexes and mill worker housing.

It includes:

- Porterdale Mill (1899), built on the north bank of the Yellow River (Yellow River (Georgia)?), a three-story brick building stretching about 800 feet (240 m) along the river, with a four-story tower (see photos #3-#8 accompanying the NRHP nomination document)
- Welaunee Mill (c.1920), on south bank of the Yellow River, a two-story brick mill with a three-story tower (see photo #1).
- Osprey Mill (1916), the largest of the three mills, covering two square blocks in the center of town (see photos 35, 36, 37, 41)

Other properties in the district include:

- Porter Memorial Gymnasium, 2201 Main St, Porterdale, Georgia (1938), designed by architect Ellamae Ellis League. Damaged by fire in October 2005, it was converted in an adaptive reuse to become an outdoor event center, winning a Georgia Trust for Historic Preservation award. (See photo #12 in NRHP document.)

Edward Lloyd Thomas (surveyor) had some involvement with the district.
