= Joseph and Mary Jane League House =

Historic house in Georgia, United States

- League, Joseph and Mary Jane, House
- U.S. National Register of Historic Places
- U.S. Historic district – Contributing property
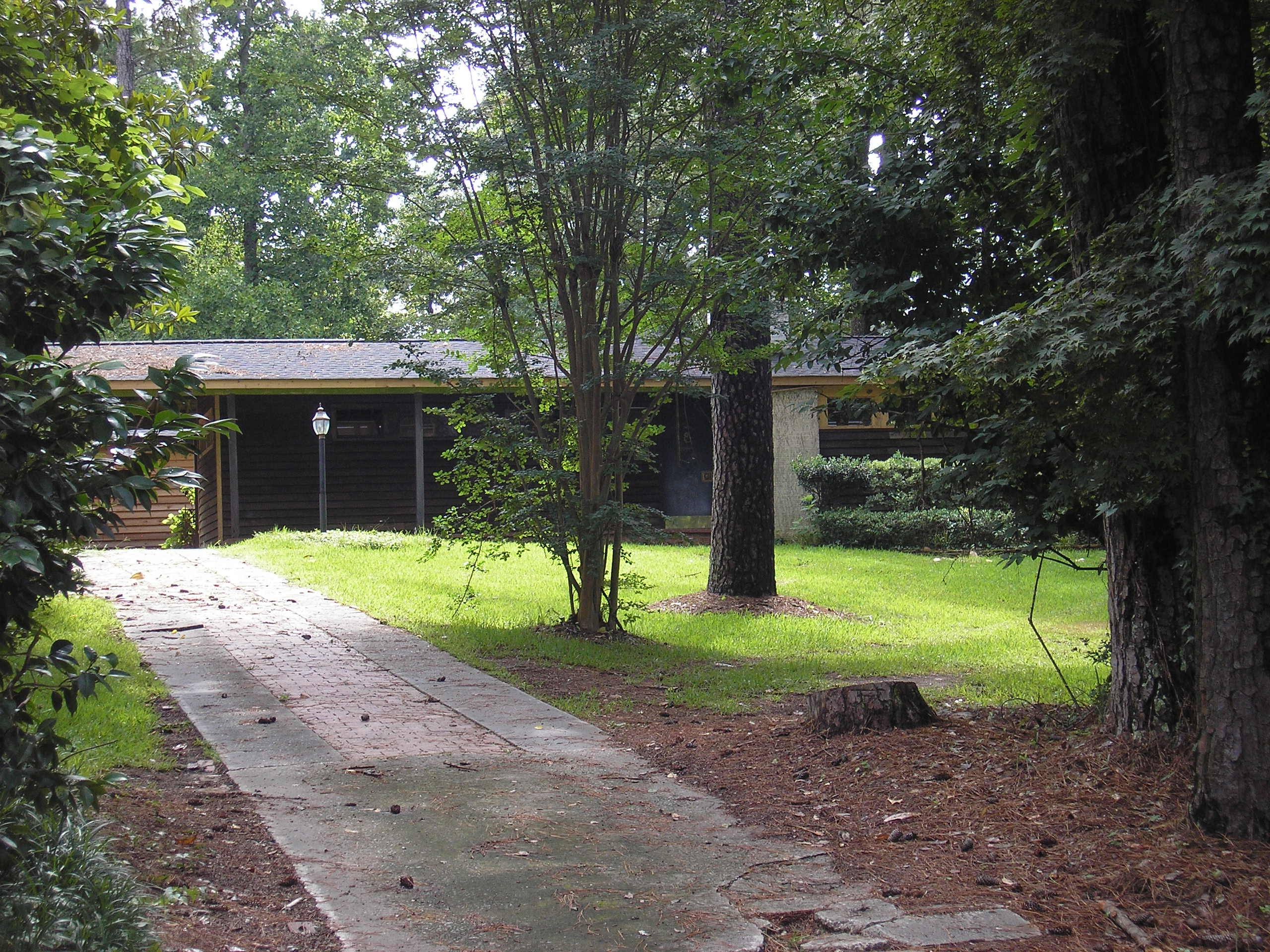
- Location: 1849 Waverland Drive, Macon, Georgia
- Coordinates: 32.873272°N 83.631837°W
- Area: approx. 0.5 acres
- Built: 1950
- Architect: Newton, Jean League
- Part of: Shirley Hills Historic District (ID14000269)
- NRHP reference No.: 08001280

Significant dates
- Added to NRHP: January 9, 2009
- Designated CP: May 27, 2014

The Joseph and Mary Jane League House, also known as the League House, is located in Macon, Georgia. It is significant for its architecture and for its association with two of the first female architects in Georgia: Ellamae Ellis League and her daughter Jean League Newton. It was listed on the National Register of Historic Places in January 2009

It was featured in a July 1953 article in the magazine Progressive Architecture. It was also included in the 1954 book Quality Budget Houses. It was listed as a featured property of the week in a program of the National Park Service that began in July 2008. It is also a contributing property within the Shirley Hills Historic District.

== See also ==
- Ellamae Ellis League House
- National Register of Historic Places listings in Bibb County, Georgia
