= Herman and Allene Shaver House =

Historic house in Georgia, United States

- U.S. National Register of Historic Places
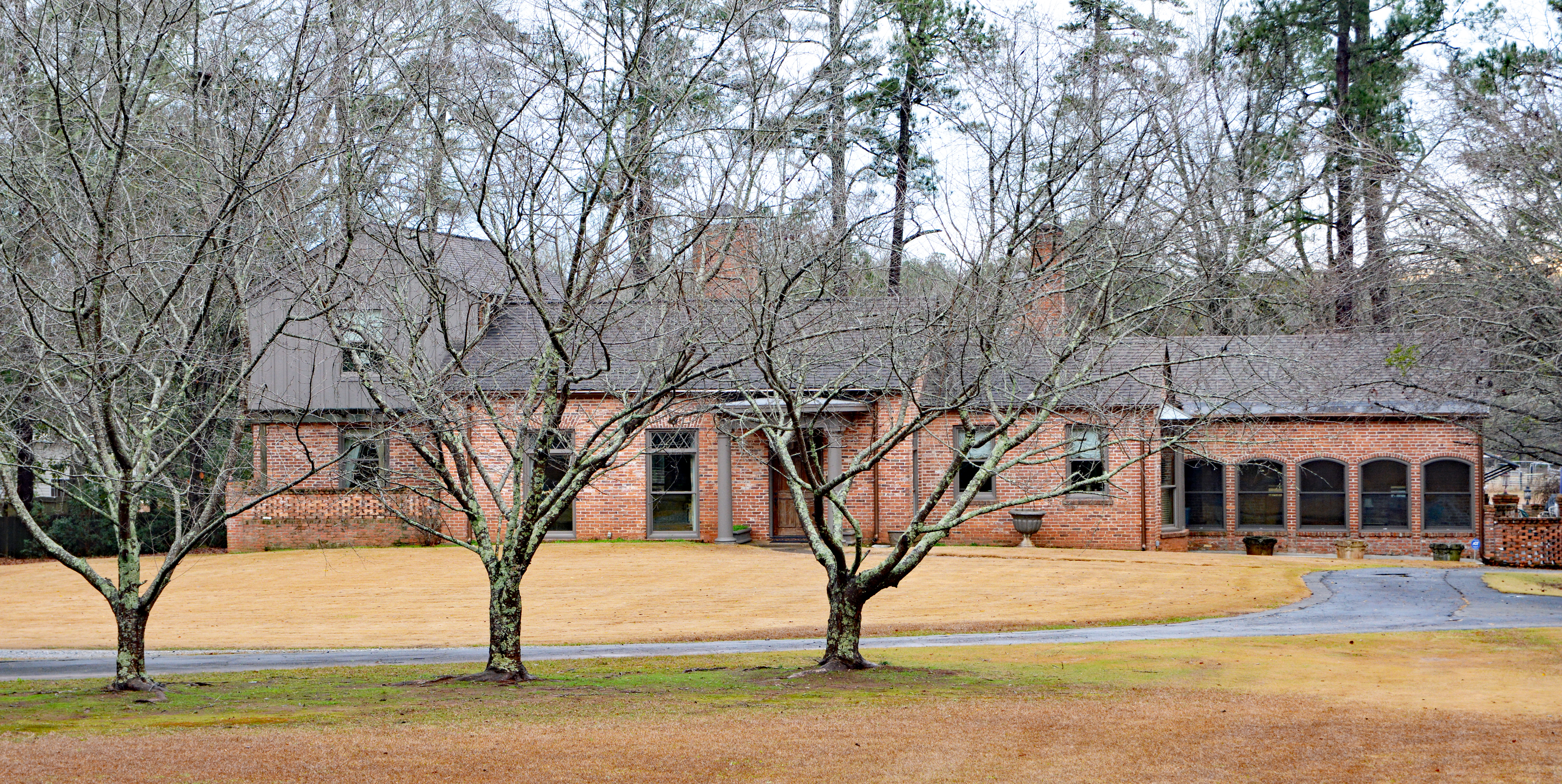

- Location within Georgia Location within the United States
- Location: 1421 Monticello Hwy., Wayside, Georgia
- Coordinates: 33.059608°N 83.605185°W
- Area: 3.22 acres (1.30 ha)
- Architect: Ellamae Ellis League
- Architectural style: Rustic
- NRHP reference No.: 13000813
- Added to NRHP: October 9, 2013

The Herman and Allene Shaver House in Wayside, Georgia was built in 1936 and was listed on the National Register of Historic Places in 2013. It was designed by architect Ellamae Ellis League.

It is a one-story U-shaped Rustic-style brick house with a two-story bedroom wing. Its largest room is the double-height living room whose ceiling is supported by hewn king-post trusses. Rustic aspects of the interior include exposed brick walls, hewn beams, cast-iron and wrought-iron fittings, and cypress paneling.

The building was modified in the 1990s by enclosure of the arcaded loggia and other changes.

It was deemed significant for the 1936 house's Rustic architecture, unusual in Georgia, "in the tradition of Frederick Law Olmsted, Calvert Vaux, and H. H. Richardson, who were inspired by the landscape and used natural forms and materials to replace expected architectural details."

Ellamae Ellis League also designed the property's one-story, two-room, brick guest cottage. The cottage, a historic pumphouse, and entrance gate posts are considered to be contributing resources in the NRHP listing. A two-car garage, a swimming pool, and a brick barbecue which were added in the 1990s remodelling were deemed non-contributing.

== Photos ==
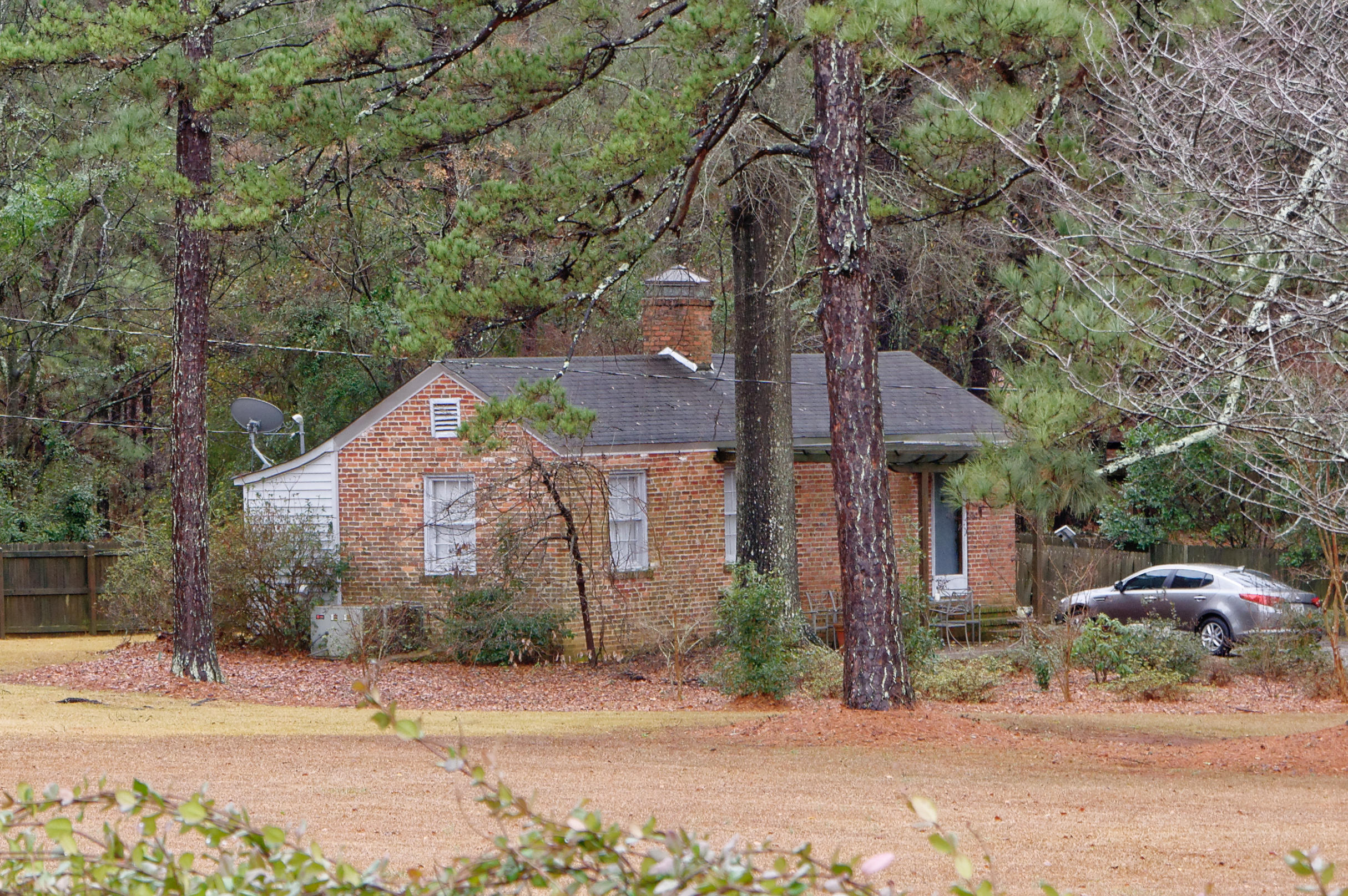
Guest cottage

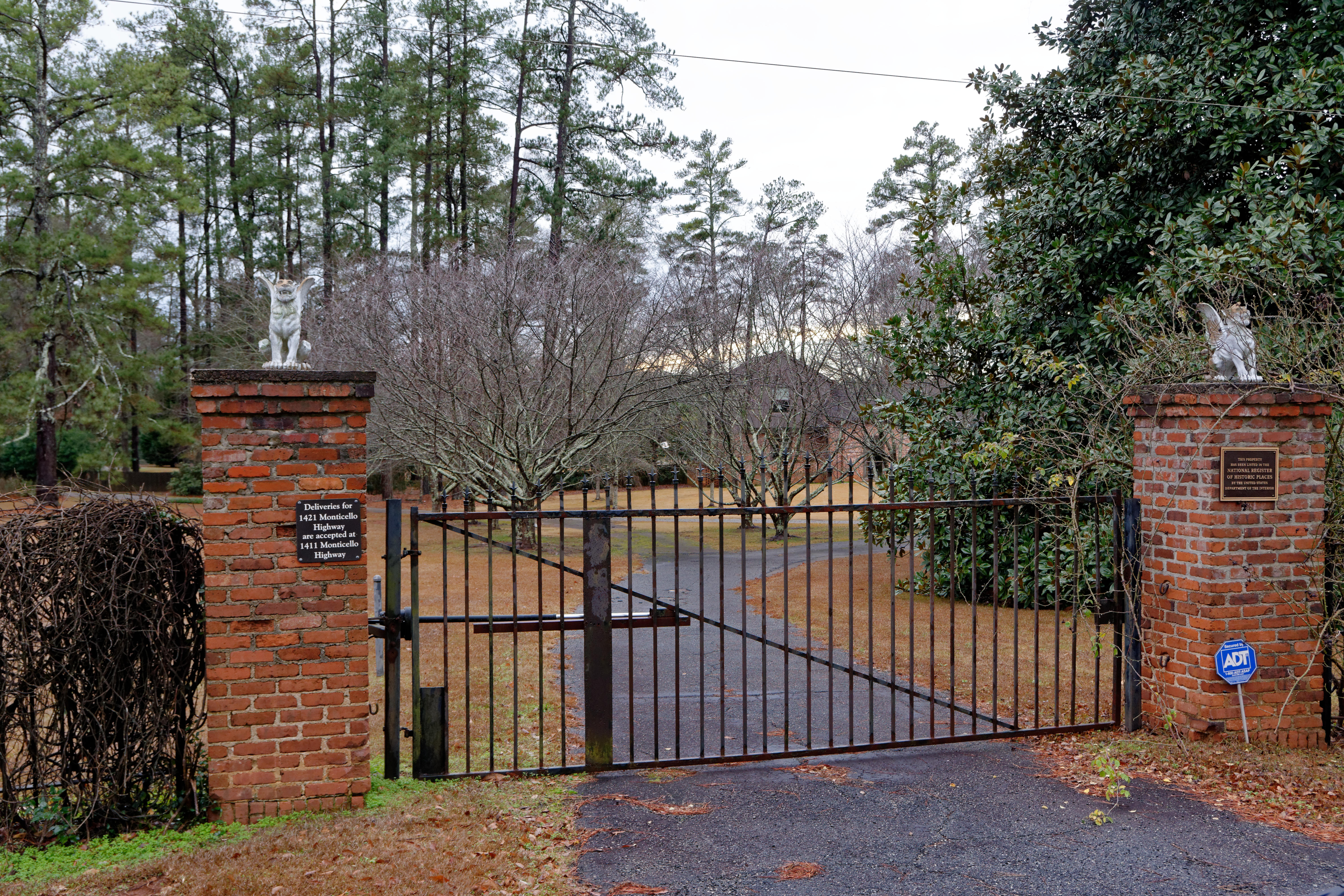
Front gate
