= Ellamae Ellis League House =

Historic house in Georgia, United States

- U.S. National Register of Historic Places
- U.S. Historic district – Contributing property
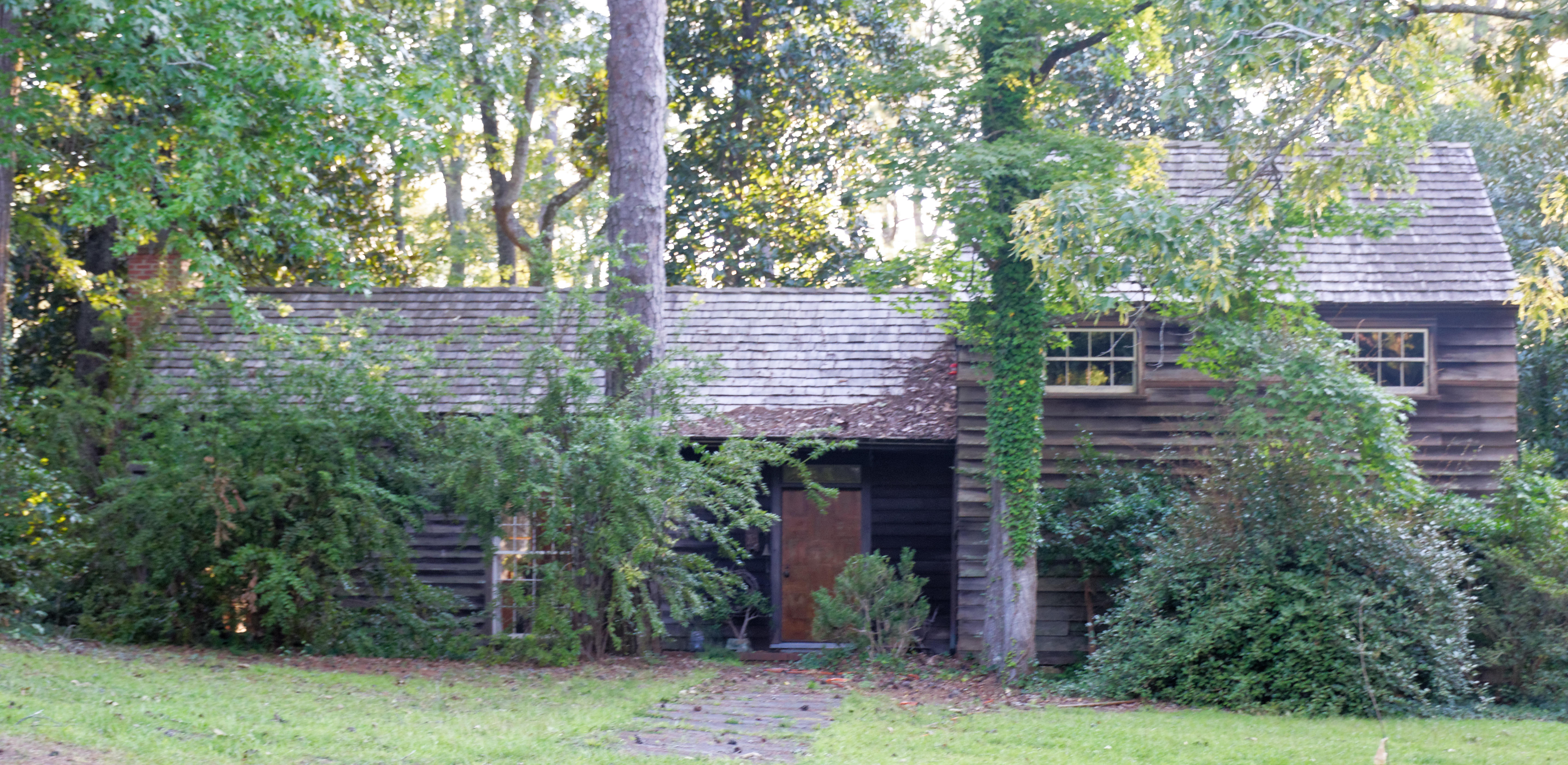
- League's personal home, which she designed in 1940 and lived in for the rest of her life.
- Location: 1790 Waverland Drive, Macon, Georgia
- Coordinates: 32.871280°N 83.631979°W.
- Built: 1940
- Architect: Ellamae Ellis League
- Part of: Shirley Hills Historic District (ID14000269)
- NRHP reference No.: 05000053

Significant dates
- Added to NRHP: February 15, 2005
- Designated CP: May 27, 2014

The Ellamae Ellis League House is a historic house in Macon, Georgia. The house was designed and owned by local architect Ellamae Ellis League and has been listed on the National Register of Historic Places since 2005. In 2022 the house was acquired by Historic Macon, a preservation group.

== History ==
Ellamae Ellis League was a twentieth-century Georgia architect. In 1940 both her children were in college, and she no longer needed to live close to work or schools. So, she designed her own home to be built in the (then) new Shirley Hills neighborhood northwest of downtown Macon.

League lived in this house from 1940 until her death in 1991. It was listed on the National Register of Historic Places in February 2005, and it was featured by the National Park Service during Women's History Month in 2005. It was the first mid-century ranch house in Georgia to be listed in the NRHP.

In 2022 the home was donated to Historic Macon, a local historic preservation group. The group plans to use $75,000 grant from the Connecticut-based 1772 Foundation to restore the house. The group plans to offer the house as a short-term rental, using the rental income to fund its maintenance and other restoration projects.

== Design ==
The League House is an asymmetrical ranch house with a split-level floor plan. Although this would become very common in later decades, this is one of the earliest in Georgia – only two others are known that predate it. It represents a move away from the bungalow style prevalent in prior years.

The house has garages on the basement level, living spaces on level one and two bedrooms above. League, who said once she had "an aversion" to the local Macon brick so common in home designs, decided to sheath the house in redwood siding.

== See also ==
- Joseph and Mary Jane League House
- National Register of Historic Places listings in Bibb County, Georgia
