= Jones County High School =

Historic public high school in Gray, Georgia, United States

- U.S. National Register of Historic Places
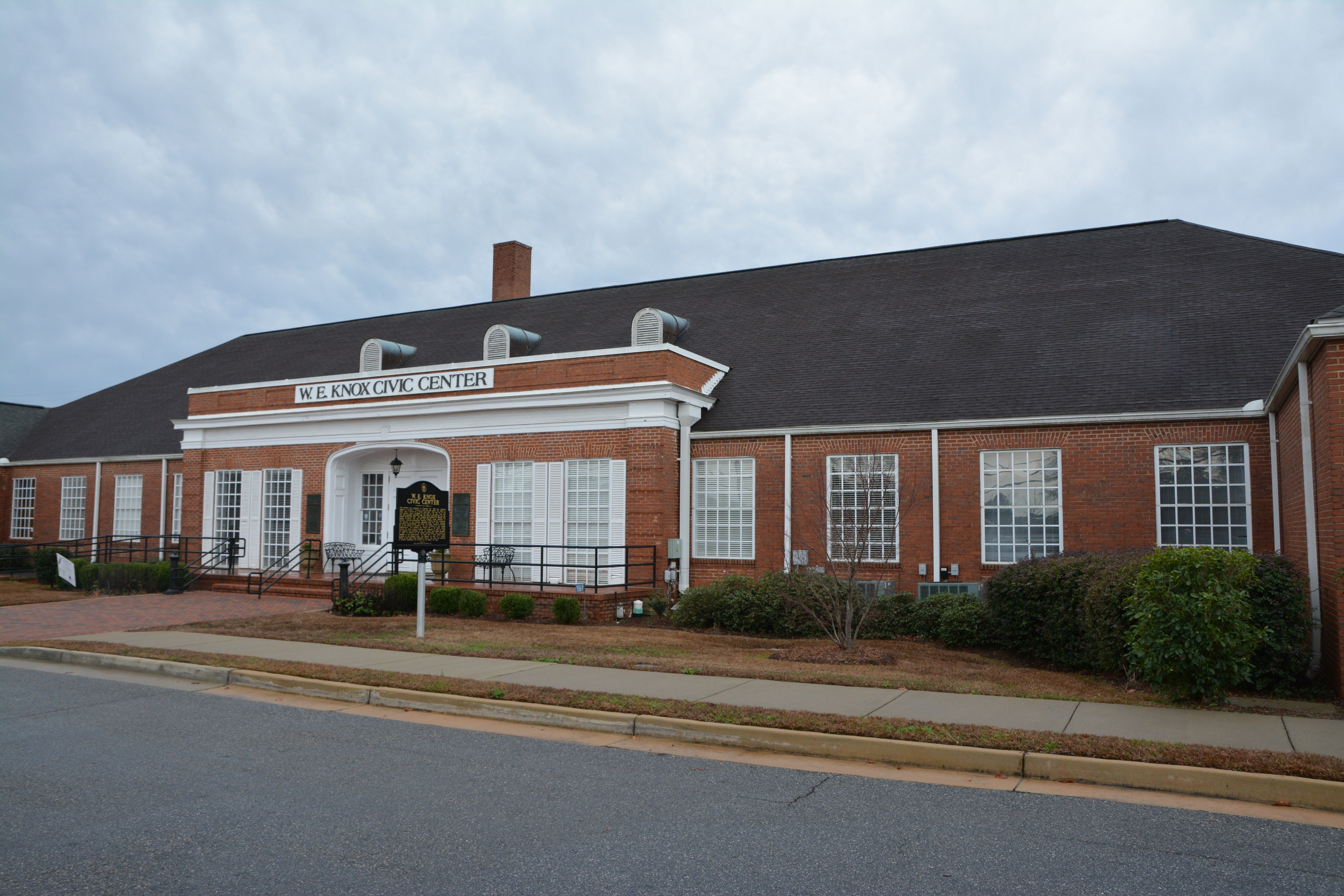

- Location within Georgia Location within the United States
- Location: 161 W. Clinton St., Gray, Georgia
- Coordinates: 33°0′26″N 83°32′19″W
- Area: 1 acre (0.40 ha)
- Built: 1936
- Architect: Ellamae Ellis League
- Architectural style: Colonial Revival
- NRHP reference No.: 99000555
- Added to NRHP: May 12, 1999

The Jones County High School, now known as the W.E. Knox Civic Center is a public high school in Gray, Georgia, United States. It was also formerly known as Gray High School, and was built in 1936 as a Public Works Administration project, to be a consolidated high school for white students. It was designed by architect Ellamae Ellis League.

It was listed on the National Register of Historic Places in 1999. It was deemed significant "as an excellent example of a H-plan school building representing the Colonial Revival style constructed with limited funds by the Public Works Administration, and for its architectural design by Ellamae Ellis League (1899-1991), a prominent and influential woman architect in Georgia."

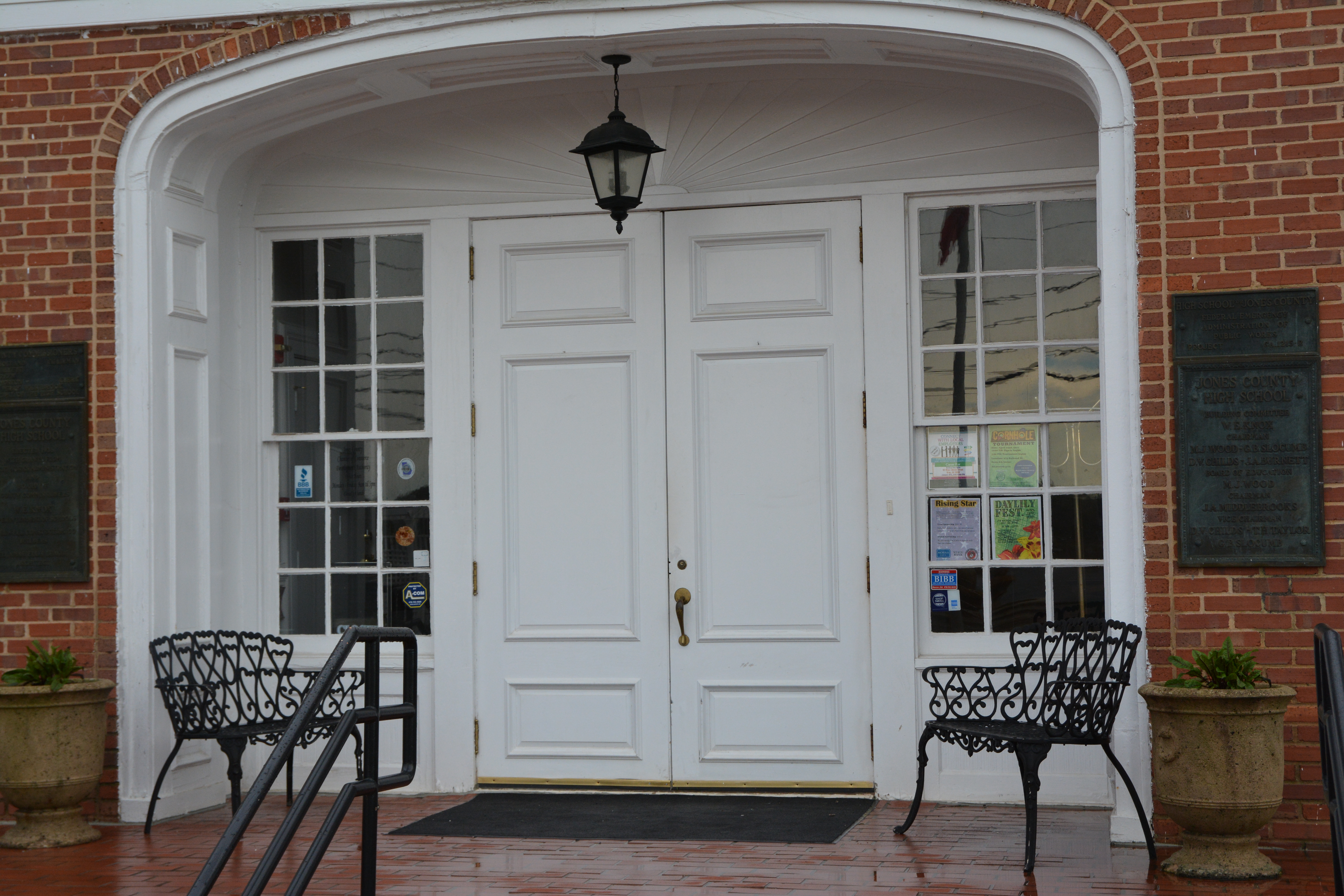
Front entrance

It is a one-story wood frame brick veneer H-plan building with a center rear ell holding the school's auditorium. Its front has a central block and adjacent wings. The center has flat roof and parapet, a wide cornice, quoins, and 16-over-16 double-hung windows. Its main doorway is recessed in an arched entranceway.

The building's owner was the Jones County/Gray Chamber of Commerce, since 1992. Nearby buildings, not included in the National Register listing, and all owned by the Jones County Board of Education, were the Jones County Junior High School with lunchroom, the Jones County Gymnasium, a Business Building, and a Vocational Building. A c.1935 library was demolished before 1999.

As of 2007, it had been repurposed as the W.E. Knox Civic Center.
