= Ellamae Ellis League =

American architect (1899–1991)

- League in 1968
- Born: Ellamae Ellis; July 9, 1899; Macon, Georgia, U.S.
- Died: March 4, 1991 (aged 91); Macon, Georgia, U.S.
- Occupation: Architect
- Years active: 1922–1975
- Children: 2
- Relatives: Charles Edward Choate (uncle); Nell Choate Jones (cousin)

Signature
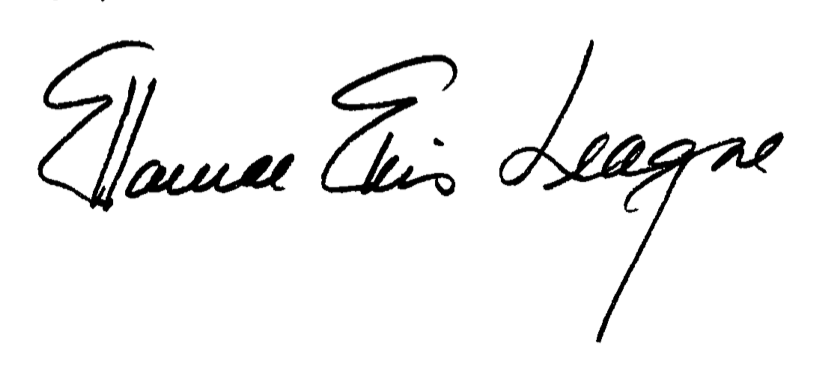

Ellamae Ellis League, FAIA (July 9, 1899 – March 4, 1991) was an American architect, the fourth woman registered architect in Georgia and "one of Georgia and the South's most prominent female architects." She practiced for over 50 years, 41 of them from her own firm. From a family of architects, she was the first woman elected a Fellow of the American Institute of Architects (FAIA) in Georgia and only the eighth woman nationwide. Several buildings she designed (including her own home) are listed on the National Register of Historic Places (NRHP). In 2016 she was posthumously named a Georgia Woman of Achievement.

== Biography ==
Ellamae Ellis was born in Macon, Georgia on July 9, 1899, the fourth child of Susan Dilworth Choate and Joseph Oliver Ellis. She attended public schools and graduated from Lanier High School in 1916.. She attended nearby Wesleyan College in 1917 and 1918 but did not graduate, as her marriage to George Forest League on June 27, 1917, would change her path.

League's children Jean and Joe were born in 1919 and 1921. In 1922 her husband of five years left her, so she found herself divorced with two children and no means of income. Six generations of her family had been architects including Charles Edward Choate, a well-known architect in Atlanta at the time. Several other relatives were artists including Nell Choate Jones and Nell Choate Shute. According to League's son Joe, the architect Curran R. Ellis (1872–1934), who designed the county courthouse and baseball stadium in Macon, is a distant relative as well. League credited her uncle with "putting the idea in her head" of becoming an architect.

=== Early career ===
In 1922 the Georgia School of Technology, whose Department of Architecture was the primary venue for architecture education in Georgia, did not allow women to attend. (This would not change until 1952). In a later newspaper interview League observed, "it's almost impossible to get a license in this state, unless you have a diploma from Georgia Tech. And women are barred as students there."

League had to seek out a different route to an architectural education. She found a job as an apprentice at the Macon firm of Dunwody and Oliphant, where she worked from 1922 to 1929. While working, she took correspondence courses from the Beaux-Arts Institute of Design (BAID) from 1924 to 1926. BAID was modeled after the École des Beaux-Arts in France and League wanted to take her education further in that vein. Leaving her young children with her parents, she continued her education with a year at Ecole des Beaux-Arts at Fontainebleau, which she attended with her cousin Nell Choate Shute in 1927 and 1928. Of the thirty people in her architecture class there, only three were women.

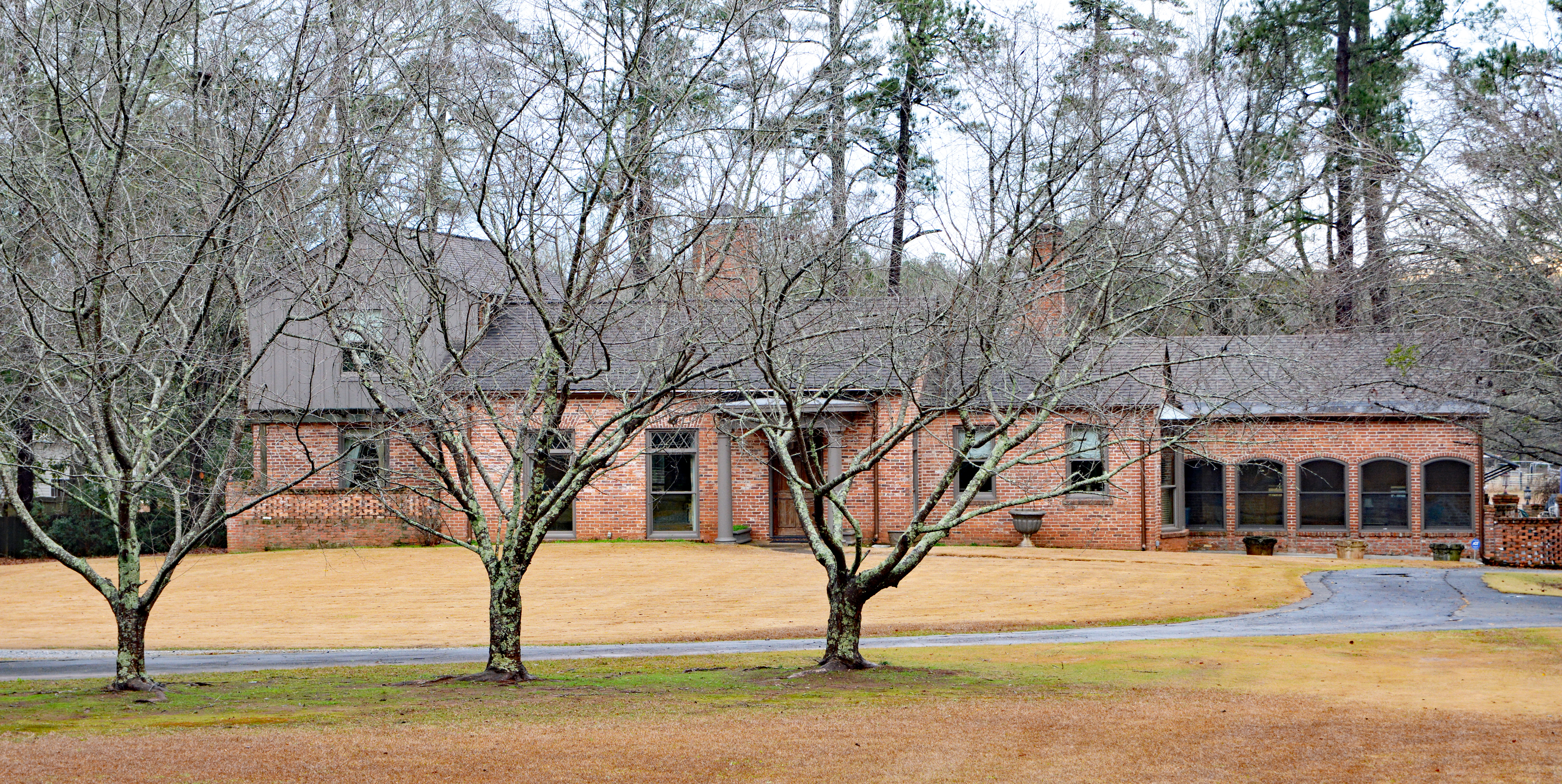
The Herman and Allene Shaver House (1936)

Upon her return she worked with other architects in Macon including George W. Shelverton and William F. Oliphant. When Oliphant started his own firm, League went with him along with Delmar A. Warren, a Georgia Tech student. Oliphant died suddenly in April 1933 at the age of 40, leaving League and Warren with a problem – neither was licensed, so they could finish existing commissions but could not legally accept new work.

The state registration for architects in Georgia required either an architecture degree (which League did not have) or ten years of experience in a licensed office (which she did) and passing a week-long examination. Her uncle gave her a crash course in the engineering parts of the test with which she was not familiar. She passed that part of the exam but failed the test on design – which was her strong suit. (One of the examiners disliked her submission). She commented later that the test was "designed to keep you out." She quickly retook that part of the exam and passed.

=== Her own practice ===
League opened her own firm in October 1933. At that time only two percent of American architects were women, and the percentage of women architects in Georgia was particularly low. League was only the fourth woman registered as an architect in the state. Most women architects at this time concentrated on residence design, but League took on a wide variety of projects. The list of her commissions from 1934 through 1969 includes many residences but also offices, retail stores, churches, schools, public housing, auditoriums, gymnasiums, hospitals, a service station and a reservoir.

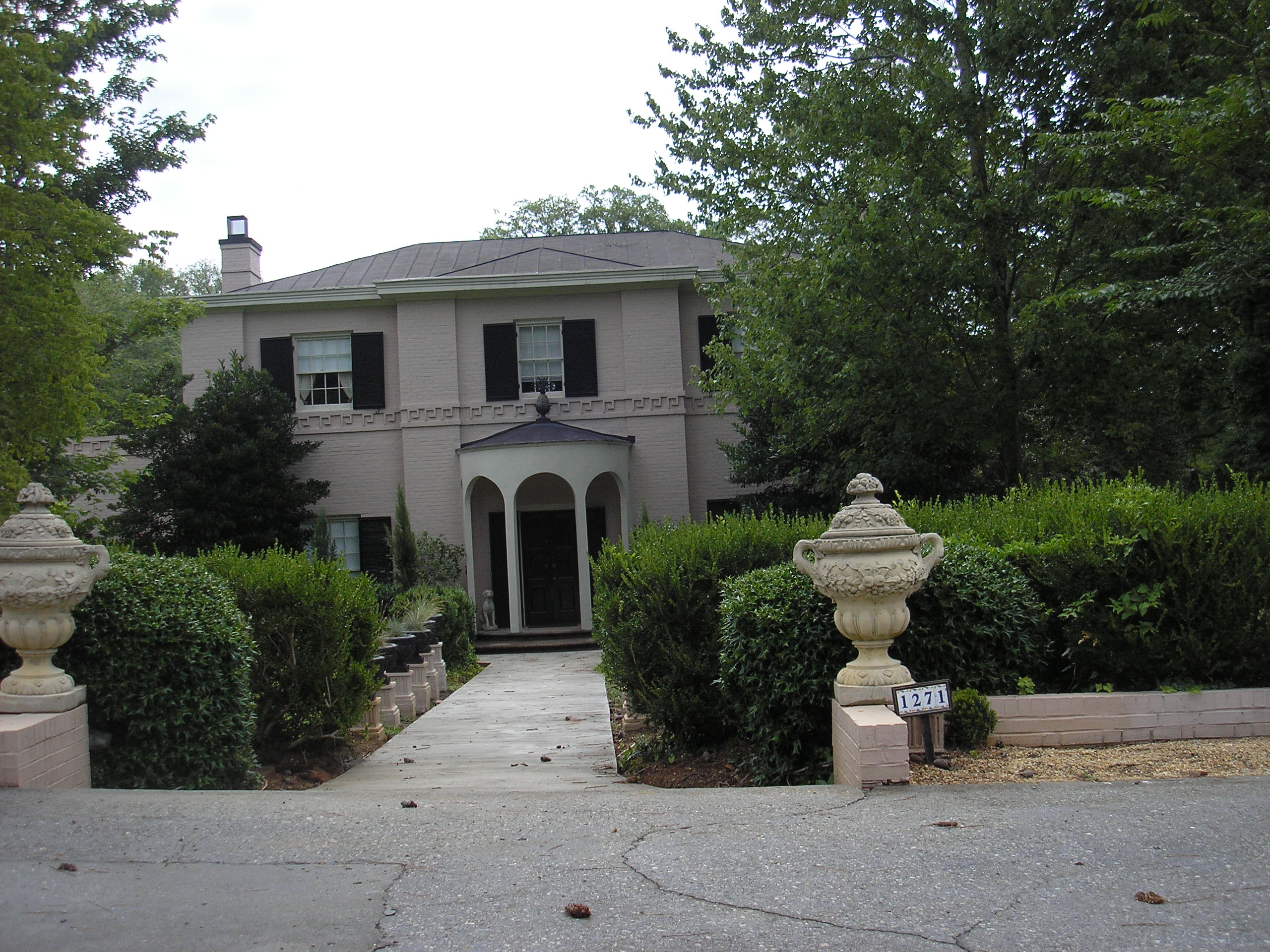
The Lee Happ house (1941) at 1271 South Jackson Springs Road in Shirley Hills in Macon is her "best known and most copied residential design".

I am always an architect. Not a woman architect, but an architect. I encourage women going into the profession not to concentrate on being separate as a woman but to concentrate on being a good architect.

— Ellamae Ellis League, Macon Telegraph interview, 1962

As her firm was founded in the middle of the Great Depression, one source of non-residence projects was commissions by the Public Works Administration. League designed a number of schools and hospitals. These became "her favorite projects, because they were so complex and were public buildings."

Another source of many commissions was James H. Porter, president of the Macon-based Bibb Manufacturing Company. His philanthropic commissions for League in Macon led to work in other locations where Bibb had operations around the statue, including Porterdale and Bibb City.

League did not establish her own distinctive style but instead followed the Ecole des Beaux Arts philosophy of "designing something that answers the need of the owner as far as function is concerned and which is pleasant to look at for both the owner and the public." She designed buildings in such styles as Colonial Revival, Classical Revival, French Vernacular Revival, Contemporary, and others.

Her firm expanded in the Post-World War II era, and League hired many young architects and gave them their start. One was Georgia Tech student Bernard A. Webb, who went on to design noted residences in the Macon area himself. League's own daughter Jean (later known as Jean League Newton) graduated from the Harvard School of Design in 1944 and joined League in her architectural practice. The firm eventually changed its name to League, Warren & Riley.

Over her career League undertook commissions in five states and 42 different counties in Georgia. A collection of 9,200 of her architectural drawings is held at the Washington Memorial Library in Macon.

=== Community involvement ===
She was selected to be a member of the American Institute of Architects (AIA) in June 1944, only the second woman from Georgia. For years she was the only woman member of the Atlanta chapter of AIA, and held several offices at the chapter and state level. In 1957 she established the Macon chapter of AIA and was its first president. Later she was chairman of the committee formed to unify the Georgia chapters, and served as president of the resulting Georgia Council of AIA from 1963 to 1964.

In 1968 League became the first woman in Georgia to be named a Fellow of the American Institute of Architects, having been nominated for that honor by the Georgia Council "for service to the profession." She was one of only eight women architects named an FAIA up to that date.

She was also involved in various civic organizations in Macon including the Macon Civic Improvement Committee and the Macon Little Theater. When demolition was threatened for Macon's Grand Opera House in 1967, League helped form the Macon Arts Council, Inc. to save it, and subsequently supervised the restoration of the building in 1969 and 1970.

=== Later life ===
League retired from her practice in 1975 after suffering a serious illness but remained an Emeritus member of AIA. She continued to receive honors from her profession after her retirement (see Honors below). She died on March 4, 1991 and is buried in Riverside Cemetery in Macon.

The tradition of architects in League's family has continued. Along with her daughter Jean, her grandson Joseph Choate League Jr. (1944-2018) was also an architect.

== NRHP listed properties ==
League designed, collaborated on, or restored a number of properties now listed on the National Register of Historic Places (NRHP):

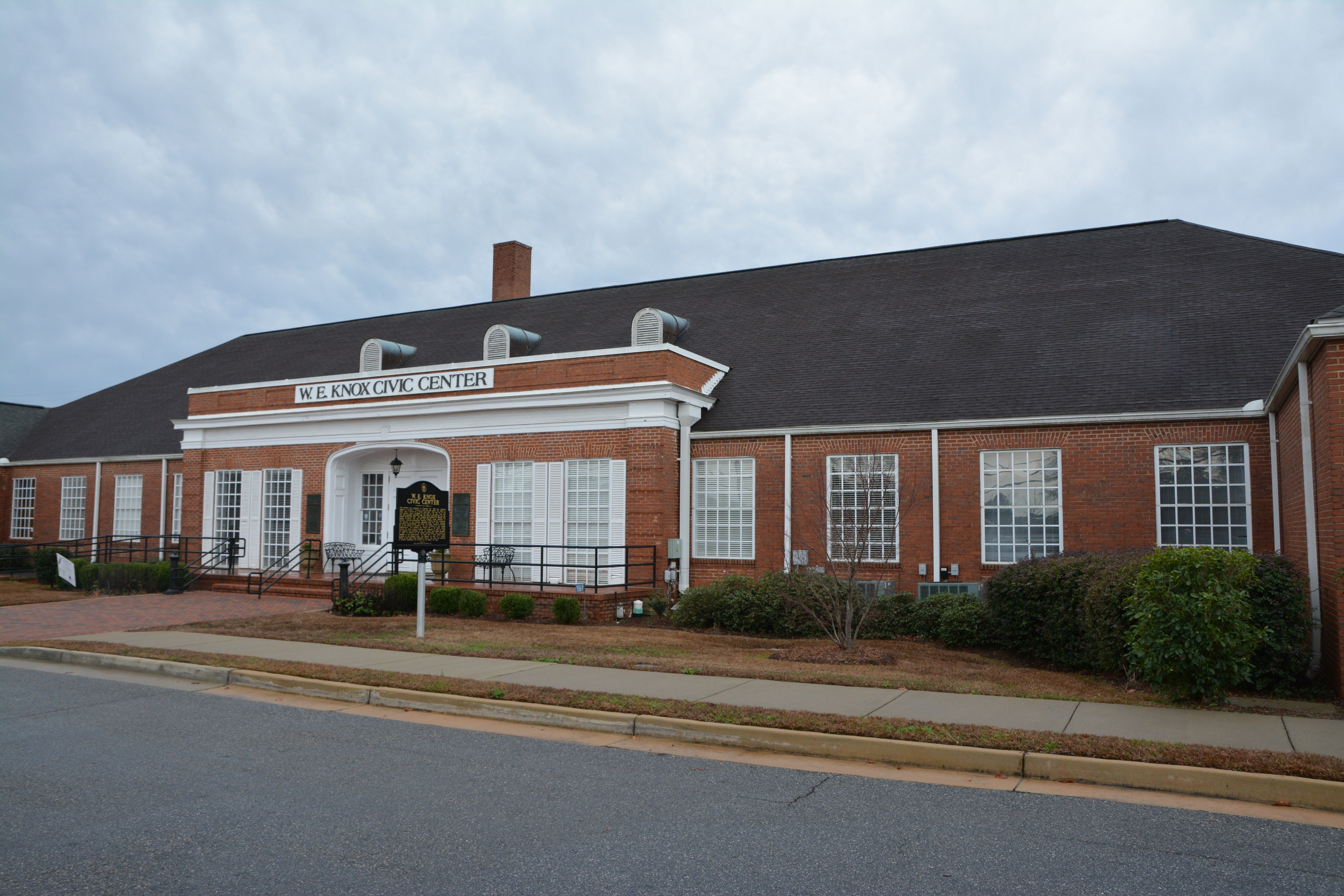
Jones County High School (1936)

- Jones County High School (a.k.a. Gray High School) 161 W Clinton St, Gray, Georgia (1936) One of League's Public Works Administration commissions, it is now repurposed as the W.E. Knox Civic Center.
- Herman and Allene Shaver House, 1421 Monticello Highway, Wayside, Georgia (1936)
- Ellamae Ellis League House, 1790 Waverland Drive, Macon, Georgia (1940) League's own home from 1940 until her death.
- Joseph and Mary Jane League House 1849 Waverland Dr, Macon, Georgia (1950) (designed with her daughter Jean League Newton)
- Renovation and restoration of the Grand Opera House (Macon, Georgia) (1968–1970)

== Other works ==
Selected additional works by League:

- Porter Memorial Gymnasium, 2201 Main St, Porterdale, Georgia (1938), part of the Porterdale Historic District. Damaged by fire in October 2005, it was converted in an adaptive reuse to become an outdoor event center, winning a Georgia Trust for Historic Preservation award.
- Leonard House (1939), 213 N. Harris St., Sandersville, Georgia, a one-story brick Colonial Revival style house with paired end chimneys, a parapet roof and accentuated front doorway, in the North Harris Street Historic District. It seems League also designed other homes in the district at about the same time.
- Comer Auditorium, 107 41st Street, Bibb City, Georgia (1941), part of the Bibb City Historic District. Damaged by rain in 2011, it was restored at a cost of $2 Million in 2013 and is now known as the Comer Center.
- Alexander School No. IV (1948 addition), 3769 Ridge Avenue, Macon, Georgia, in the Ingleside Historic District. She also designed 3359 Osborne Place (1955–1956), 3395 Osborne Place (1940 & 1955), 3396 Osborne Place (1950s), 3180 Ingleside Avenue (1964–1965), and other works on Ridge Avenue, Riverdale Drive, and Vista Circle in the district.
- Ballard-Hudson High School in Macon, Georgia (1949). Demolished circa 2005.
- Twenty-two contributing residences built between 1937 and 1959 in the Shirley Hills Historic District in Macon, Georgia.
- Mr. & Mrs. J. C. Haynes Residence, 3100 N. Craycroft Road, Tucson, Arizona (1956)
- Mr. & Mrs. William Best Jr. Residence, 11450 E. Speedway, Tucson, Arizona (1957)
- Scottish Rite Temple, 1985 Vineville Ave, Macon, Georgia. (1962).
- "Grand Topper" House, 1884 Long Ridge Place, Macon, Georgia. (1970) Built to be auctioned off to raise funds for the Grand Opera House restoration, it was later owned by Gregg Allman.

== Honors ==
League was awarded the Alumnae Award for Distinguished Achievement by Wesleyan College in 1969. She received the Ivan Allen Senior Trophy for her work on the Macon opera house renovation in 1975. On her retirement, League was presented the AIA Bronze Medal for "outstanding service to the AIA and/or the community." The Georgia chapter bestowed their Bernard R. Rothschild FAIA Award ("the highest honor AIA Georgia can bestow on an individual") on her in 1982, its inaugural year. In 2016 she was posthumously inducted into the Georgia Women of Achievement Hall of Fame.

== See also ==
- Henrietta Cuttino Dozier – the first woman architect in Georgia
- Julia Morgan – another early woman architect in California who had a career similar to League's
- Leila Ross Wilburn – another of the first woman architects in Georgia, also born in Macon
