= Nell Choate Jones =

American painter (1879–1981)

- Born: Nell Hinton Choate; May 27, 1879; Hawkinsville, Georgia, U.S.
- Died: April 15, 1981 (aged 101); New York, U.S.
- Resting place: Orange Hill Cemetery, Hawkinsville, Georgia, U.S.
- Years active: 1920s–1970s

Nell Hinton Choate Jones (1879–1981) was an American artist and educator, who painted scenes of the Southern United States in a highly individualized expressionist style. Her style is characterized by the simplification of forms, rhythmic designs, and use of vibrant colors.

== Biography ==
Nell Choate Jones was born in Hawkinsville in Pulaski County, Georgia. Her birth name was Nell Hinton Choate, and she was the daughter of Sarah Cornelia Roquemore and James Dearborn Choate, who served in the Confederate army as Captain during the Civil War (1861–65). Her cousin was Macon architect Ellamae Ellis League, and she was also a distant relative of Nell Choate Shute, the first wife of artist Ben Shute. Nell's father died when she was four, and the family moved to Brooklyn, New York. She lived much of her life in Brooklyn until her death at the age of 101.

Jones taught preschool and elementary school for many years. It wasn't until the 1920s that she began to study art at the encouragement of her husband Eugene A. Jones, a painter and etcher. She studied with Fred J. Boston, John Carlson, and Ralph Johonnot. She exhibited jointly with her husband in 1927 at Holt Gallery in New York City. Her impressionist scenes received considerable acclaim. In 1929, she attended the art school at Fontainebleau School of Fine Arts in Fontainebleau, France on scholarship and later studied in England.

She returned to Georgia in 1936 to attend the funeral of her sister. This inspired her to begin painting the South, which consumed her work for the next two decades. For example, her work Georgia Red Clay depicts the vibrant red color of Georgia's clay soil. She became active in arts and women's organizations and contributed significantly to women's causes. She served as a member of the Southern States Arts League, Studio Traveling Guild, and Boston Art Club. As a member of the Pen and Brush Club, she won the first prize in 1946 and the Founder's Prize in 1951. She was president of the Brooklyn Society of Artists from 1949–1952 and was a board member of the Brooklyn Museum of Art. She also served as the president of the National Association of Women Artists in the 1950s.

Jones was awarded an honorary doctorate by the State University of New York in 1972 and received the Distinguished Citizen Award from the Brooklyn Museum of Art in 1979. She exhibited regularly across North America in the 1940s and 1950s as well as overseas in France, Holland, Belgium, Switzerland, Greece, and Japan. Her work can be found in many museums, including the High Museum of Art in Atlanta, Georgia and the Morris Museum of Art in Augusta, Georgia.

== See also ==
- List of artists from Brooklyn
