= Shirley Hills Historic District =

Historic district in Georgia, United States

- U.S. National Register of Historic Places
- U.S. Historic district
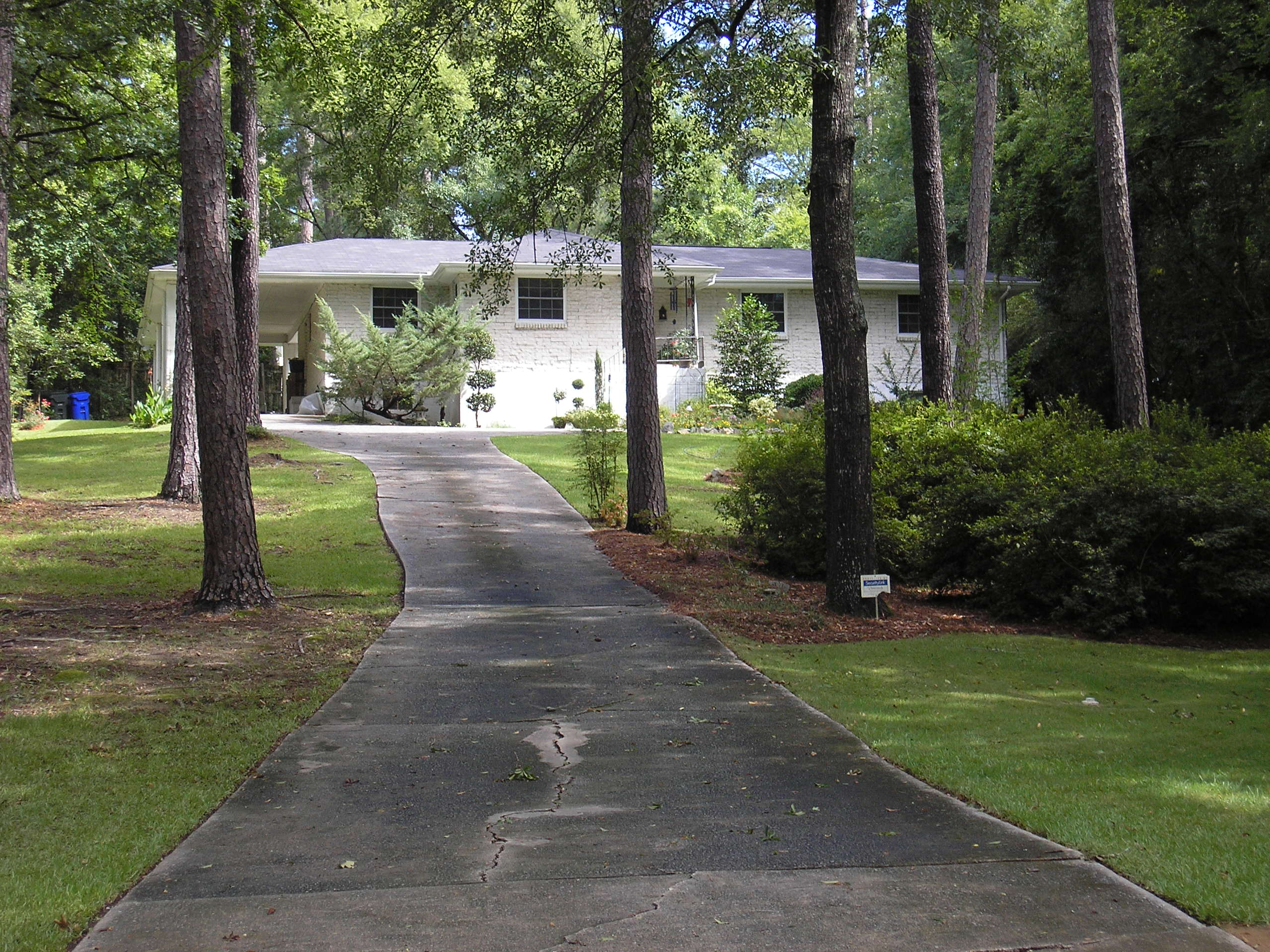
- 1725 Waveland Circle

- Location within Georgia Location within the United States
- Location: Roughly Senate Pl., Parkview Dr., Curry Dr., Briarcliff Rd., Nottingham Dr., and the Ocmulgee River; also roughly bounded by Boulevard Ave., Woodland Dr., Waveland Cir., Nottingham, Briarcliff & Upper River Rds., Macon, Georgia
- Coordinates: 32.85917°N 83.63056°W
- Area: 275 acres (111 ha) (original);
- Built: 1922
- Architect: W. Elliott Dunwody, IV; Et al.
- Architectural style: Late 19th And 20th Century Revivals, Bungalow/craftsman
- NRHP reference No.: 89001093, 14000269
- Added to NRHP: August 17, 1989 (original); May 28, 2014 (increase)

The Shirley Hills Historic District in Macon, Georgia is a historic district which was listed on the National Register of Historic Places in 1989 and was expanded in 2014. It includes 401 contributing buildings and 68 non-contributing ones, and 27 contributing sites, and one contributing structure.

Originally it was a 275 acres (111 ha) area including 85 contributing buildings, one other contributing structure, and three contributing sites. The original was roughly bounded by Senate Pl., Parkview Dr., Curry Dr., Briarcliff Rd., Nottingham Dr., and the Ocmulgee River. The boundary increase added 271 contributing buildings and 24 contributing sites.

The district includes Jackson Springs Park and a bird sanctuary. It includes two buildings which are separately listed on the National Register:

- Ellamae Ellis League House, 1790 Waverland Drive,
- Joseph and Mary Jane League House, 1849 Waverland Drive.

Notable architects whose work appears in the original area include W. Elliott Dunwody, IV (1893-1986), who designed 10 houses in the district; Ellamae Ellis League, who designed seven; Dennis & Dennis, who designed two; and John Leon Hoffman.
