= List of justices of the Supreme Court of Georgia (U.S. state) =

This is a list of the justices of the Supreme Court of Georgia, the highest judicial authority of the U.S. state of Georgia:

== Justices ==
Judge	Began active service	Ended active service	Term as chief justice
Eugenius Aristides Nisbet	1845	1853	
Joseph Henry Lumpkin	1845	1867	1863–1867
Hiram B. Warner	1845	1853	
Ebenezer A. Starnes	1853	1855	
Henry L. Benning	1853	1859	
Charles James McDonald	1855	1859	
Linton Stephens	1859	1860	
Richard F. Lyon	1859	1865	
Charles J. Jenkins	1860	1865	
Iverson L. Harris	1866	1868	
Dawson A. Walker	1866	1868	
Hiram B. Warner	1867	1880	1867–1868; 1872–1880
Joseph E. Brown	1868	1870	1868–1870
Henry Kent McCay	1868	1875	
Osborne Augustus Lochrane	1871	1872	1871–1872
William Watts Montgomery	1872	1873	
Robert Pleasant Trippe	1873	1875	
Logan Edwin Bleckley	1875	1880	
James Jackson	1875	1887	1880–1887
Willis A. Hawkins	1880	1880	
Alexander M. Speer	1880	1882	
Martin J. Crawford	1880	1883	
Samuel A. Hall	1882	1887	
Mark Harden Blandford	1883	1890	
Logan Edwin Bleckley	1887	1894	1887–1894
Thomas J. Simmons	1887	1905	1894–1905
Samuel Lumpkin	1891	1903	
Spencer Roane Atkinson	1894	1897	
Henry T. Lewis	1897	1902	
William A. Little	1897	1903	
William H. Fish	1897	1923	1905–1923
Andrew Jackson Cobb	1897	1907	
Samuel B. Adams	1902	1902	
John S. Candler	1902	1906	
Henry G. Turner	1903	1904	
Joseph Rucker Lamar	1903	1905	
Beverly Daniel Evans Jr.	1904	1917	
Joseph Henry Lumpkin II	1905	1916	
Marcus Wayland Beck	1905	1937	
Samuel C. Atkinson	1906	1942	
Horace Moore Holden	1907	1911	
Hiram Warner Hill	1911	1934	
S. Price Gilbert	1916	1936	
Walter F. George	1917	1922	
James K. Hines	1922	1932	
Richard Russell Sr.	1923	1938	1923–1938
R. C. Bell	1932	1949	1943–1946
John Belgium Hutcheson	1934	1938	
William Franklin Jenkins	1936	1948	1947–1948
Warren Grice	1937	1945	
Charles S. Reid	1938	1943	1938–1943
William Henry Duckworth	1938	1969	1948–1969
Samuel Dunbar Hewlett	1942	1942	
William Yates Atkinson Jr.	1943	1953	
Lee Buren Wyatt	1943	1960	
T. Grady Head	1945	1965	
Thomas S. Candler	1945	1966	
L. C. Groves	1948	1948	
John Harold Hawkins	1949	1960	
Bond Almand	1949	1972	1969–1972
Charles W. Worrill	1953	1954	
Homer Sutton	1954	1954	
Carlton Mobley	1954	1974	1972–1974
Joseph Dillard Quillian	1960	1966	
Benning Moore Grice	1960	1975	1974–1975
Eugene Cook	1965	1967	
Horace Elmo Nichols	1966	1980	1975–1980
John E. Frankum	1967	1970	
Hiram Keller Undercofler	1967	1981	1980–1980
Jule W. Felton	1969	1972	
Peyton Hawes	1970	1973	
William B. Gunter	1972	1977	
Robert H. Jordan	1972	1982	1980–1982
George Conley Ingram	1973	1977	
Robert Howell Hall	1974	1979	
Harold Nelson Hill Jr.	1975	1986	1982–1986
Jesse G. Bowles	1977	1981	
Thomas O. Marshall	1977	1989	1986–1989
Harold G. Clarke	1979	1994	1990–1992; 1992–1994
Hardy Gregory Jr.	1981	1989	
George T. Smith	1981	1991	
Charles L. Weltner	1981	1992	1992–1992
Richard Bell	1982	1992	
Willis B. Hunt Jr.	1986	1995	1994–1995
Robert Benham	1989	2020	1995–2001
Norman S. Fletcher	1990	2005	2001–2005
Carol W. Hunstein	1992	2018	2009–2012; 2012–2013
Leah Ward Sears	1992	2009	2005–2009
George H. Carley	1993	2012	2012–2012
Hugh P. Thompson	1994	2017	2013–2017
Harris Hines	1995	2018	2017–2018
Harold Melton	2005	2021	2018–2021
David Nahmias	2009	2022	2021–2022
Keith R. Blackwell	2012	2020	
Michael P. Boggs	2017	2025	2022–2025
Nels S. D. Peterson	2017	present	2025–present
Britt Grant	2017	2018	
Sarah Hawkins Warren	2018	present	
Charlie Bethel	2018	present	
John J. Ellington	2019	present	
Carla Wong McMillian	2020	present	
Shawn Ellen LaGrua	2021	present	
Verda Colvin	2021	present	
Andrew Pinson	2022	present	
Benjamin Land	2025	present	
