= George H. Carley =

American lawyer and judge (1938–2020)

29th Chief Justice of the Supreme Court of Georgia
- In office May 29, 2012 – July 17, 2012
- Preceded by: Carol Hunstein
- Succeeded by: Carol Hunstein (Note: Hunstein resumed her role as Chief Justice when Carley retired.)

Associate Justice of the Supreme Court of Georgia
- In office March 16, 1993 – May 29, 2012
- Appointed by: Zell Miller
- Preceded by: Richard Bell
- Succeeded by: Keith Blackwell

Chief Judge of the Georgia Court of Appeals
- In office 1989–1990

Judge of the Georgia Court of Appeals
- In office April 5, 1979 – March 16, 1993
- Appointed by: George D. Busbee

Personal details
- Born: George Holmes Carley; September 24, 1938 Jackson, Mississippi, U.S.
- Died: November 26, 2020 (aged 82) Atlanta, Georgia, U.S.
- Spouse: Sandra M. Lineberger
- Education: University of Georgia (AB, LLB)

Military service
- Branch/service: United States Army; United States Army Reserve
- Years of service: 1956–1960

George Holmes Carley (September 24, 1938 – November 26, 2020) was an American lawyer and judge. From Decatur, Georgia, he served on the Supreme Court of Georgia from March 1993 until July 2012, acting as Chief Justice for the last two months of his term.

== Early life and career ==
Carley was born in Jackson, Mississippi, in 1938, the only child of George L. Carley Jr. and Dorothy Holmes Carley. His family moved to Decatur, Georgia, in 1948. His father was a member of the United States Public Health Service and while posted in Burma, Carley attended the eighth and ninth grades at the Woodstock School in Mussoorie, India, from 1951 to 1953. Returning to the United States, Carley graduated from Decatur High School in 1956. He served in the United States Army Reserve from 1956 to 1960, and was on active duty in 1956.

Carley received his A.B. from the University of Georgia in 1960 and his LL.B. from the University of Georgia School of Law in 1962. He was a member of Alpha Tau Omega. He stated that his favorite professor in law school was the property law expert Verner F. Chaffin.

Carley was admitted to the bar in 1961 and for three months served in the title department at the Atlanta law firm of Hansell, Post, Brandon & Dorsey before quitting and returning to Decatur, where he practiced from 1963 until becoming a judge in 1979. He was briefly an attorney for the U.S. Public Housing Administration before leaving to start a solo practice that grew into a larger law firm. Carley served as a member of the Georgia House of Representatives in 1966 and in 1971 became a partner with the Decatur firm of McCurdy & Candler. He represented the Housing Authority of the City of Decatur and also served as a Special Assistant Attorney General for the Georgia Department of Transportation, handling eminent domain cases.

== Judicial career ==
Governor George D. Busbee appointed Carley to the Georgia Court of Appeals on April 5, 1979. He was subsequently elected to a full six-year term in 1980 and reelected in 1986 and 1992. He was chief judge from 1989 to 1990 and presiding judge from 1991 to 1991. On March 16, 1993, Governor Zell Miller elevated Carley to the Supreme Court of Georgia. He was elected to a full six-year term in 1994 and reelected in 2000 and 2006. In 2009, Carley was elected as presiding judge. In his retention elections, he never faced opposition.

In October 2011, Carley announced plans to retire from the Supreme Court in July 2012. Governor Nathan Deal would be able to appoint his successor, who would have to run for reelection in 2014. At the end of 2011, Chief Justice Carol Hunstein asked the Associate Justices to allow her to step down so that Carley could serve out the rest of his term as chief justice. The Associate Justices voted unanimously in favor of Huntstein's gesture. Carley officially delivered his resignation to Deal on February 3, 2012, announcing his retirement effective July 17.

On May 29, 2012, Carley was sworn in as the 29th Chief Justice of the Georgia Supreme Court. At his investiture, all six living former chief justices were in attendance: Hunstein, Robert Benham, Harold Clarke, Norman Fletcher, Willis Hunt and Leah Ward Sears. Carley became the first justice to serve as Chief Justice and presiding judge on both the Supreme Court and the Georgia Court of Appeals. After his retirement, Hunstein resumed her role as chief justice. Deal appointed Court of Appeals judge Keith Blackwell to replace Carley. Prior to retiring, Carley stated that he hoped to become a private mediator or arbitrator or a senior trial judge after leaving the Court.

== Jurisprudence ==
Carley was often the lone justice on the Supreme Court to dissent from a decision. His jurisprudence emphasized judicial deference to the legislature; for example, in 1998 he was the lone dissenter in a 6–1 decision striking down the state sodomy law.

In criminal cases, Carley often sided with the state over the defendant. However, he also emphasized legal procedure. He dissented in a decision in which the court allowed evidence from a warrantless search to be used against a woman charged in a child abuse death, writing that the Fourth Amendment "has no exception for troubling cases and we should not let hard cases make bad law."

In civil cases, Carley often sided with plaintiffs. He was known for an important pro-plaintiff decision in a no-fault insurance case from early in his judicial career.

== Personal life and death ==
Carley married Sandra M. (Sandy) Lineberger of Macon in 1960. The couple had one son.

Carley had a heart attack and later quit smoking. He was a longtime Georgia Bulldogs football fan. He was described as "quintessentially old school" and almost never appeared in public without his "signature attire" of a coat and tie, which he wore even while riding a mule in the Grand Canyon. He had retinal detachment that made him blind in his right eye with diminished vision in his left.

Carley died from COVID-19 on November 26, 2020, at the age of 82.
