= Horace Elmo Nichols =

American judge (1912–2000)

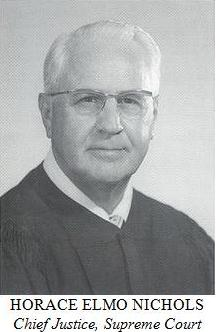
- Born: July 16, 1912; Elkmont, Alabama
- Died: June 8, 2000 (aged 87)
- Education: Cumberland University
- Occupations: Lawyer and Judge
- Years active: 1935–80
- Known for: Modernizing and streamlining Georgia's judicial system
- Title: Chief Justice of the Supreme Court of Georgia
- Term: 1975–80
- Political party: Democratic Party
- Spouse: Edith Mae Bowers
- Children: Nancy Bates Nichols Glenn; Carol Elizabeth Nichols Henwood; H. E. Nichols, Jr.
- Parent(s): Mr. and Mrs. William Henry Nichols

Horace Elmo Nichols (July 16, 1912 – June 8, 2000), also known as H. E. "Nick" Nichols, was an American jurist in Georgia who served as chief justice of the Supreme Court of Georgia from 1975 to 1980.

== Personal life ==
Nichols was born in Elkmont, Alabama, to Mr. and Mrs. William Henry Nichols. He attended public school in Birmingham. His early training in piano and voice resulted in a lifelong love of music.

He married Edith Mae Bowers in October 1945. They had two daughters and a son. Mrs. Nichols died in May 1984.

== Education ==
He received his Bachelor of Law degree from the Cumberland School of Law while it was part of Cumberland University at Lebanon, Tennessee. He later studied constitutional law at Columbia University. He was a member of the Sigma Alpha Epsilon fraternity and Blue Key Honor Society.

== Career ==
He was admitted to the State Bar of Georgia in December 1935 and began practicing law in Canton, Georgia. In 1938, he became Assistant Solicitor of the Blue Ridge Circuit in Georgia where he served until 1940 when he moved to Rome, Georgia. After practicing law for six years in Rome, he was appointed Assistant Attorney General of Georgia, serving two years. On October 18, 1948, he was appointed Judge of the Superior Court for the Rome Circuit. At the expiration of the appointment, he was elected to a full term.

In 1952, the Atlanta Constitution published stories regarding a Floyd County court's handling of some traffic tickets. Judge Nichols took exception to accusations of the court's mishandling of the cases. After the Constitution refused to publish information the Judge wanted added, he found Ralph McGill and William Fields in contempt of court and sentenced each to 20 days in jail plus a two hundred dollar fine. McGill was a nationally prominent editor and the story was carried by Time magazine. The contempt citation was reversed by the Supreme Court of Georgia in January 1953. He continued as Superior Court Judge until January 15, 1954, when Governor Herman E. Talmadge appointed him to the Court of Appeals of Georgia.

In November 1966, after twelve years on the Court of Appeals, Governor Carl E. Sanders appointed Nichols as a justice of the Supreme Court of Georgia, to a seat vacated by the resignation of Justice Joseph D. Quillian. In 1975 Nichols became Chief Justice and served until retiring in December 1980. In 1982 he became one of a group of fourteen prominent people who helped establish and founded the Georgia State University College of Law offering an American Bar Association accredited evening curriculum. He died in Atlanta on June 8, 2000, after having suffered a stroke.

== Clubs and organizations ==
Judge Nichols was a member of the Piedmont Driving Club, the Capital City Club, the Coosa Country Club, Gridiron Secret Society, Benevolent and Protective Order of Elks, and Woodmen of the World.

== Legacy ==
He was known for his support of the death penalty, but his most lasting legacy was the elevation of the Georgia judiciary to a higher level of professionalism and respect. Upon becoming Chief Justice, he insisted on the judiciary receiving the same respect as the executive and legislative branches of government. His development of a unified appeal process in death penalty cases helped to eliminate delays in executing sentences. He allowed both cameras and tape recorders in the courtroom so that the public could have a better understanding of the work of the judiciary.

Preceded by Benning M. Grice	Chief Justice of the Supreme Court of Georgia; 1975–1980	Succeeded by Hiram K. Undercofler
