= Robert H. Jordan =

American judge (1916–1992)

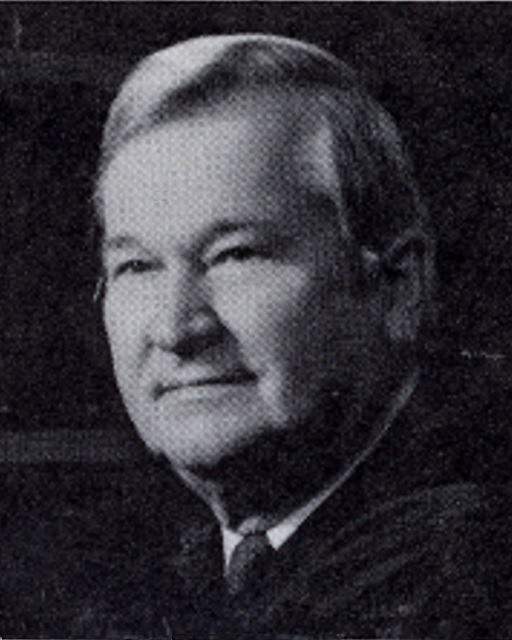
- Official portrait, c. 1980

Chief Justice of the Supreme Court of Georgia
- In office December 20, 1980 – November 1, 1982
- Preceded by: Hiram K. Undercofler
- Succeeded by: Harold N. Hill

Justice of the Supreme Court of Georgia
- In office April 3, 1972 – November 1, 1982
- Appointed by: Jimmy Carter
- Preceded by: Bond Almand
- Succeeded by: Richard Bell

Judge of the Georgia Court of Appeals
- In office November 1, 1960 – April 3, 1972
- Appointed by: Ernest Vandiver
- Preceded by: Bernard Clay Gardner
- Succeeded by: Irwin W. Stolz Jr.

President pro tempore of the Georgia State Senate
- In office January 12, 1959 – February 20, 1959
- Preceded by: Dixon Oxford
- Succeeded by: Carl Sanders

Member of the Georgia State Senate from the 25th district
- In office January 12, 1959 – March 31, 1959
- Preceded by: L. A. Mallory Jr.
- Succeeded by: John H. Woodall
- In office January 12, 1953 – January 10, 1955
- Preceded by: L. A. Mallory Jr.
- Succeeded by: William B. Steis

Personal details
- Born: Robert Henry Jordan; February 6, 1916 Talbotton, Georgia, U.S.
- Died: October 23, 1992 (aged 76)
- Party: Democratic
- Spouse: Jean Ingram (m. 1944)
- Children: 4
- Education: University of Georgia
- Occupation: Lawyer; politician

Military service
- Branch/service: United States Army
- Years of service: 1941–1946
- Rank: Major
- Unit: Office of the Inspector General
- Battles/wars: World War II; American theater

Robert Henry Jordan (February 6, 1916 – October 23, 1992) was a justice of the Supreme Court of Georgia from 1972 to 1980, and chief justice from 1980 to 1982.

== Early life, education, and career ==
Born in Talbot County, Georgia, Jordan attended the public schools, and received a J.D. from the University of Georgia School of Law in 1941. He served in the United States Army during World War II, from 1941 to 1946, achieving the rank of major. He practiced law beginning in 1946 in the Talbotton, Georgia. In 1953, he was elected to Georgia State Senate, serving again as President Pro-Tem in 1959. He briefly served on the Georgia State Highway Board in 1960, but later that year Governor Ernest Vandiver appointed Jordan to the Georgia Court of Appeals, where he served until 1972.

== Service on the Supreme Court of Georgia ==
In March 1972, Governor Jimmy Carter appointed Jordan to the Supreme Court of Georgia. Jordan became Chief Justice December 20, 1980 and served in that capacity until November 1, 1982.

Jordan also wrote a history of his home county, There Was a Land, a history of Talbot County, Georgia.

U.S. Route 80 between downtown Talbotton and the Taylor County line has been renamed the Robert Henry Jordan Memorial Highway in his honor.

Political offices
Preceded by Bond Almand	Justice of the Supreme Court of Georgia; 1972–1982	Succeeded by Richard Bell
