= Jule W. Felton =

American judge (1898–1978)

Jule Wimberly Felton (August 22, 1898 – December 21, 1978) was an American lawyer who served as a justice of the Supreme Court of Georgia from 1969 to 1972.

== Early life and education ==
Born in Montezuma, Georgia, Felton attended The Webb School in Bell Buckle, Tennessee, before receiving a B.A. from Oxford College of Emory University in Oxford, Georgia. He graduated with honors in law from Mercer University.

== Career ==
Governor Richard Russell Jr. appointed Felton to a seat on the Georgia Public Service Commission on December 31, 1931. Felton served until July 21, 1933, when he was removed from office by Governor Eugene Talmadge, which Felton later described as a "political move." Felton ran for a seat on the state supreme court in 1934, but was unsuccessful.

== Judicial service ==
In 1936, Felton was elected to a seat on the state court of appeals, and was privately sworn in by Governor Talmadge on December 21, 1936, to formally take office January 1, 1937. Felton was reelected to the court of appeals five times, without opposition, serving a total of 32 years on the court, "the longest term of any justice". He served as chief judge from 1954 to 1969, during which time he authored a line that was inscribed in marble over the bench of the court: "Upon the integrity, wisdom and independence of the judiciary depend the sacred rights of free men".

In September 1969, Governor Lester Maddox appointed Felton to a seat on the state supreme court vacated by the elevation of Bond Almand to the position of chief justice, following the death of previous Chief Justice William Henry Duckworth.

Felton served until his retirement from the court on December 31, 1971, compelled by, in his words, "a growing consensus that judges should retire at about age 70". Felton was 73 at the time of his retirement.

== Personal life and death ==
On June 24, 1930, Felton married Mary Julia Sasnett, with whom he had one son, Jule Felton Jr., who also became a lawyer, and was a successful state politician.

Felton died at Piedmont Hospital after suffering a heart attack, at the age of 80. His wife survived him, and died in May 1986.

Political offices
Preceded by Bond Almand	Justice of the Supreme Court of Georgia; 1969–1972	Succeeded by William B. Gunter
