= Carol W. Hunstein =

American judge

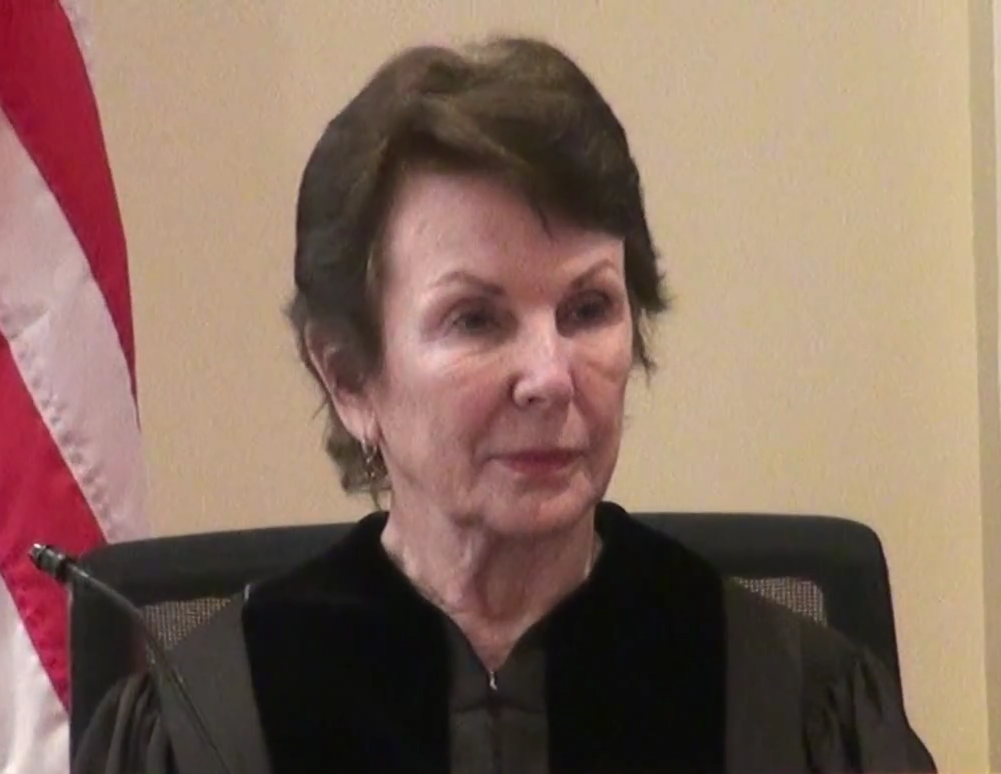

Chief Justice of the Georgia Supreme Court
- In office July 17, 2012 – August 15, 2013
- Preceded by: George H. Carley
- Succeeded by: Hugh P. Thompson
- In office July 1, 2009 – May 29, 2012 (Note: Hunstein stepped down to allow George H. Carley to serve the last two months of his judgeship as chief justice. She resumed her role when he retired.)
- Preceded by: Leah W. Sears
- Succeeded by: George H. Carley

Associate Justice of the Georgia Supreme Court
- In office August 15, 2013 – December 31, 2018
- Succeeded by: John Ellington
- In office November 1992 – July 1, 2009
- Appointed by: Zell B. Miller

Judge of the DeKalb County Superior Court
- In office 1984 – November 1992

Personal details
- Born: Carol Lynn Wyckoff; August 16, 1944 (age 81) Miami, Florida, U.S.
- Spouse: Ralph J. Hunstein (m. 1976)
- Education: Miami Dade Community College (AA); Florida Atlantic University (BS); Stetson University (JD)

Carol Wyckoff Hunstein (born August 16, 1944) is an American lawyer and judge from Georgia. She is a former Justice of the Supreme Court of Georgia. She served on the Court as an associate justice from 1992 to 2009 and 2013 to 2018 and as Chief Justice from 2009 to 2013.

== Early life and education ==
Hunstein was born in Miami, Florida, on August 16, 1944, to John C. and Mary Reynolds Wyckoff. By age 23, she was a divorced, single mother who had lost her left leg to cancer. However, she overcame this adversity receiving an Associate's degree from Miami-Dade Community College in 1970, and shortly thereafter a Bachelor of Science degree from Florida Atlantic University (FAU) in 1972. Upon graduation from FAU, Hunstein enrolled in the Stetson University College of Law. In 1976, she received her Juris Doctor, was admitted to the Georgia Bar Association, and subsequently went into private practice.

== Career ==
Hunstein moved from Florida to Atlanta, Georgia, in 1976. Having established herself in the legal community by 1984, she ran against four men for election to the Superior Court in DeKalb County and made it into the runoff. During the three-week runoff, for the first time Hunstein began using the slogan “This time, this woman,’’ and upon election became the first female superior court judge in the county.

In November 1992, Hunstein was nominated to the Supreme Court of Georgia by Governor Zell Miller. She was the second female Associate Justice in Georgia history. Hunstein was re-elected by voters four times, most recently in November 2012. In June 2009, Hunstein was unanimously elected to replace the retiring Leah Ward Sears as chief justice. Hunstein served from July 2009 until August 2013, taking a hiatus from May to July 2012 to allow presiding judge George Carley to serve as Chief Justice before he retired. Presiding judge Hugh P. Thompson was elected to replace Hunstein at the end of her term. Hunstein then resumed her role as Associate Justice, serving until her retirement at the end of 2018. She was replaced by Georgia Court of Appeals judge John Ellington.

Hunstein also served as an adjunct professor at the Emory University School of Law.

== Personal life ==
Carol married Ralph J. Hunstein in 1976. They have two daughters (Krista and Gabrielle) and a son from her previous marriage (John Abate).

== See also ==
- List of female state supreme court justices

Legal offices
Preceded by Leah Ward Sears	Chief Justice of the Supreme Court of Georgia; 2009–2013	Succeeded by Hugh P. Thompson
