= William Watts Montgomery =

American judge (1827–1897)

William Watts Montgomery (November 11, 1827 – January 9, 1897) was a justice of the Supreme Court of Georgia from 1872 to 1873.

Born in Augusta, Georgia, Montgomery attended Georgetown College and the University of Georgia until 1847, and was admitted to the bar on June 13, 1849.

He entered into private practice in Waynesboro, Georgia in partnership with John T. Shewmake. After encountering health problems, he returned to Augusta in 1854. In 1860, he was appointed solicitor-general of the Middle circuit, which included Richmond County, serving until 1866, "when he retired rather than take what was then called the "iron-clad" oath". During this time, as part of this service, he also advised the state governor, and was statutorily the equivalent of Attorney General of Georgia. In 1868 he entered into a partnership with ex-Governor Herschel V. Johnson.

In February 1872, Governor James Milton Smith appointed Montgomery to the Supreme Court of Georgia, following the elevation of sitting justice Hiram B. Warner to chief justice. Montgomery served on the court for one year, until February 1873. He then returned to Augusta and entered into a partnership with ex-Judge James S. Hook, which continued until the fall of 1887, "when the latter removed to Atlanta". Montgomery remained in solo practice until his death.

Political offices
Preceded by Hiram B. Warner	Justice of the Supreme Court of Georgia; 1872–1873	Succeeded by Robert Pleasant Trippe
