= Harold N. Hill =

American judge (1930–2010)

Harold Nelson Hill Jr. (April 26, 1930 – July 5, 2010) was an American lawyer who served as associate justice of the Supreme Court of Georgia from 1975 to 1982, and chief justice from 1982 to 1986.

== Early life and education ==
Born in Houston, Texas, and raised in Atlanta, Georgia, Hill graduated from North Fulton High School in 1948 and earned his undergraduate degree, magna cum laude, from Washington and Lee University in 1952. Hill served in the United States Army from 1952 to 1954, and then received a J.D. from Emory University School of Law in 1957.

== Legal career ==
On December 31, 1974, Governor Jimmy Carter announced that he was appointing Hill to a seat on the state supreme court vacated by the retirement of Justice Benning M. Grice. Hill was Carter's last appointment as Governor.

In 1982, Hill was elected by his fellow justices to serve as chief justice, to succeed retiring Chief Justice Robert H. Jordan.

As chief justice, Harold supported a range of proposed reforms to the judicial system, including combining specialty courts into courts of broader jurisdiction, providing defense attorneys to criminal defendants, giving prosecutors equal power to reject jurors from jury pools as was enjoyed by defense attorneys, and increasing access to discovery for criminal defendants. At the same time, he acknowledged that many of those reforms were unlikely to come about for various political reasons.

Hill retired from the state supreme court in February 1986 to return to private practice, and was succeeded as chief justice by his colleague Thomas O. Marshall.

== Personal life and death ==
Hill died of cardiac arrest while in hospice care at his home in Cumming, Georgia, at age 80.

Political offices
Preceded by Benning M. Grice	Justice of the Supreme Court of Georgia; 1975–1982	Succeeded by Richard Bell
Preceded by Robert H. Jordan	Chief Justice of the Supreme Court of Georgia; 1982–1986	Succeeded by Thomas O. Marshall
