= Harold G. Clarke =

American judge

Member of the Georgia State House of Representatives from the 33rd district
- In office January 1961 – January 1971
- Preceded by: William Bradford Freeman
- Succeeded by: Phillip Benson Ham

Associate Justice of the Supreme Court of Georgia
- In office 1979–1990
- Appointed by: George Busbee

22nd & 24th Chief Justice of the Supreme Court of Georgia
- In office August 1992 – 1994
- Succeeded by: Willis B. Hunt, Jr.
- In office 1990 – June 1992 (Note: Clarke stepped down to allow Charles L. Weltner to serve as Chief Justice before he died.)
- Preceded by: Thomas Oliver Marshall, Jr.
- Succeeded by: Charles L. Weltner

Personal details
- Born: September 28, 1927 Forsyth, Georgia
- Died: February 26, 2013 (aged 85) Forsyth, Georgia
- Party: Democratic
- Spouse: Nora (Gordon) Clarke
- Education: University of Georgia (BA, LLB)
- Profession: Attorney, politician, jurist

Harold Gravely Clarke (September 28, 1927 – February 26, 2013) was an American jurist and politician.

== Early life and education ==
Harold G. Clarke was born in Forsyth, Georgia, on September 28, 1927, to Jack H. and Ruby Lumpkin Clarke. He attended Mary Persons High School, before enlisting in the United States Army, at age 17, during the final years of World War II. While in the service, he worked as a journalist, quickly rising to the position of managing editor of Pacific Stars And Stripes. After the war, with help from the G.I. bill, Clarke enrolled in the University of Georgia, where he earned a bachelor's degree, then a law degree. He then returned to his hometown of Forsyth, to set up his law practice. In addition to practicing law, Clarke continued his earlier work as a journalist when he took on the added duties of editor and publisher of the Monroe Advertiser, a local paper owned by his father.

== Political career ==
Clarke served five terms as a member of the Georgia House of Representatives. First elected in 1960, he took office in January 1961 under the county unit system representing Monroe County as representative from the 33rd district. After the abolition of the county unit system, the 33rd district was expanded to include Butts County. Clarke was a member of the Democratic party, and served during a 10-year period when the Georgia General Assembly began transitioning from a body comprised almost exclusively of Democrats to one with a growing number of Republicans.

== Judicial career ==
After serving in the legislature, Clarke returned to the full-time practice of law. In 1976 he was elected president of the State Bar of Georgia. During his tenure as Bar president, he challenged lawyers to improve their work and better themselves. In 1979, Georgia Governor George Busbee appointed Clarke to the Georgia Supreme Court, where he served as Associate Justice until 1990. In 1990 he was elected by his colleagues to the position of 22nd Chief Justice, which he held until June 1992 when he stepped down, to allow his friend Justice Charles L. Weltner, who was battling cancer, to serve the last few months of his life as chief justice. When Justice Weltner died in August 1992, Clarke resumed the position of 22nd Chief Justice, until 1994. He has been described as one of the most influential jurists in state history. In 1985, he published a book: Remembering Forward, about growing up in a small Southern town in the 1930s and 1940s. Clarke died in Forsyth, Georgia, on February 26, 2013, at the age of 85.
