= Justice Beck =

Justice Beck may refer to:

- Charles Edward Inkin Beck, judge in Rhodesia and Zimbabwe
- Joseph M. Beck (1823–1893), associate justice of the Iowa Supreme Court
- Marcus Wayland Beck (1860–1943), associate justice of the Supreme Court of Georgia
