= Iverson L. Harris =

American judge (1805–1876)

Iverson Louis Harris (1805 – 1876) was a justice of the Supreme Court of Georgia from 1866 to 1868.

He was born in Watkinsville, Georgia. He lived in Milledgeville, Georgia. He succeeded Judge Charles J. Jenkins as the latter became governor.

He had a namesake son who was a professor at the Theosophical Society Lomaland.

Political offices
Preceded by Charles J. Jenkins	Justice of the Supreme Court of Georgia; 1866–1868	Succeeded by Hiram B. Warner
