= Hiram K. Undercofler =

American judge (1916–1998)

Hiram Keller Undercofler

Justice of the Supreme Court of Georgia
- In office 1967 – July 31, 1981

Chief Justice of the Supreme Court of Georgia
- In office March 1, 1980 – December 20, 1980

Personal details
- Born: July 25, 1916 Philadelphia, Pennsylvania, U.S.
- Died: July 23, 1998 (aged 81) Atlanta, Georgia, U.S.
- Spouse: Flora Gatewood Undercofler
- Children: Hiram Keller (son); Dale Undercofler (daughter)
- Education: Temple University (B.A.); University of Georgia School of Law (J.D.)

Military service
- Branch/service: United States Army Air Forces
- Years of service: 1940–1945
- Rank: First Lieutenant

Hiram Keller Undercofler (July 25, 1916 – July 23, 1998) was an American attorney, state legislator, and judge who served as a justice of the Supreme Court of Georgia from 1967 to 1981, including a period as chief justice in 1980.

== Early life, education, and military service ==
Born in Philadelphia, Pennsylvania, he graduated from Temple University, where he was a member of the Phi Beta Kappa honor society. He briefly attended Temple University Law School before enlisting as a flying cadet in the United States Army Air Corps in 1940. During World War II he was stationed at Souther Field in Americus, Georgia, and achieved the rank of first lieutenant. After the war, he entered the University of Georgia School of Law, receiving his Juris Doctor degree and beginning a law practice in Americus.

== Political career ==
Undercofler practiced law in Americus from 1946 to 1963 and was elected to the Georgia House of Representatives from Sumter County in 1959, serving two terms and remaining in that office until 1962.

He was appointed Georgia state revenue commissioner by Governor Carl Sanders in 1963. Undercofler modernized the department by installing computer equipment to cross-check residents' federal and state income taxes, substantially improving tax collection, and also worked to suppress liquor moonshining and bootlegging. In September 1965 he denied reports that he planned to resign, stating that he had no offers and no intention to leave the post at that time.

== Judicial service ==
In December 1966, Governor Sanders announced that he intended to appoint Undercofler to the Georgia Supreme Court to fill the seat vacated by Justice Thomas S. Candler. Undercofler joined the court in 1967 and was later elected to complete Candler's term, and to two full six-year terms of his own. Undercofler served "as a presiding Justice, from January 1, 1975 to March 1, 1980 and again from December 1980 to July 1981, and as Chief Justice from March l to December 20, 1980".

In June 1981, Undercofler announced his retirement from the bench effective July 31, 1981, which allowed Governor George Busbee to make his fourth appointment to the state Supreme Court.

== Personal life and death ==
On July 4, 1942, Undercofler married Flora Gatewood in Americus. They had one son, Hiram Jr., and one daughter, Dale. Hiram Jr. changed his name to Hiram Keller, and had a successful stage and film acting career before his death from cancer in 1997.

Undercofler died of cancer at a hospice in Atlanta shortly before his 82nd birthday.

Political offices
Preceded by Thomas S. Candler	Justice of the Supreme Court of Georgia; 1967–1981	Succeeded by Charles L. Weltner
