= Hugh P. Thompson =

American judge

Hugh Proctor Thompson (born July 7, 1943) is a former Chief Justice of the Georgia Supreme Court. He was originally appointed to the Supreme Court by Governor Zell Miller on March 1, 1994. Thompson is a graduate of the Walter F. George School of Law of Mercer University. Thompson was born in Macon, Georgia.

Legal offices
Preceded by George H. Carley	Chief Justices of the Supreme Court of Georgia; 2013–2016	Succeeded by Harris Hines
