= Charles L. Weltner =

American judge and politician (1927–1992)

Charles Longstreet Weltner
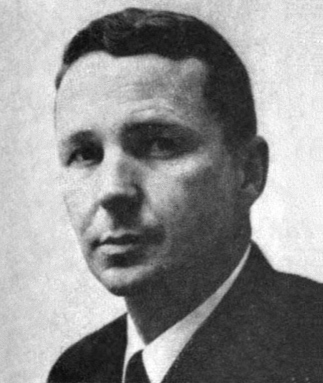

Member of the U.S. House of Representatives from Georgia's 5th district
- In office January 3, 1963 – January 3, 1967
- Preceded by: James C. Davis
- Succeeded by: Fletcher Thompson

Judge of the Fulton County Superior Court
- In office 1976–1981

Justice of the Supreme Court of Georgia
- In office 1981–1992

23rd Chief Justice of the Supreme Court of Georgia
- In office June 1992 – August 1992
- Preceded by: Harold G. Clarke
- Succeeded by: Harold G. Clarke

Personal details
- Born: December 17, 1927 Atlanta, Georgia, U.S.
- Died: August 31, 1992 (aged 64) Atlanta, Georgia, U.S.
- Party: Democratic
- Education: Oglethorpe University; Columbia Law School

Military service
- Branch/service: United States Army

Charles Longstreet Weltner (December 17, 1927 – August 31, 1992) was an American jurist and liberal politician from the U.S. state of Georgia. From 1963 to 1967, he served two terms in the U.S. House of Representatives.

== Early years and education ==
Weltner was born in Atlanta, Georgia on December 17, 1927, to Philip Weltner and Sally Hull. Philip was an attorney, academic leader, and reformer who served as the first chancellor of the Georgia Board of Regents. In 1948, Charles received a bachelor's degree from Oglethorpe University, where his father served as president, in suburban DeKalb County, Georgia. In 1950, he received a law degree from Columbia Law School in New York City. After serving two years in the United States Army, Weltner practiced law in Atlanta and worked to defeat Georgia's county-unit system and preserve the public school system after state leaders threatened to close the schools rather than integrate.

== Congress ==
In 1962, Weltner was elected to represent Georgia's 5th congressional district in the House of Representatives as a Democrat. He ran against Republican Leland James O'Callaghan, where he defeated him 55.6%–44.4%.

In 1964, he faced O'Callaghan again, and defeated him 54%–46%.

=== Record on civil rights ===
Weltner was one of only two Southern members of Congress to condemn the 16th Street Baptist Church bombing in Birmingham, Ala., in 1963 by white supremacists that killed four girls and injured between 14 and 22 other people. He was one of just two members of the state's congressional delegation to vote for the Voting Rights Act of 1965, commenting that "We must not remain forever bound to another lost cause." He also supported quick implementation of the United States Supreme Court decision to outlaw racial segregation in public schools, the 1954 decision Brown v. Board of Education. Despite this, Weltner initially voted with the majority of his Southern colleagues against the Civil Rights Act of 1964, but voted for the final version with the Senate amendment.

=== Retirement ===
In 1966, Weltner refused to run for re-election when the state Democratic Party demanded that he sign a loyalty oath that would have required him to support Lester Maddox, an ardent segregationist who was running for governor against a Republican U.S. representative, Howard Callaway. In a speech, Weltner said, "I love the Congress, but I will give up my office before I give up my principles." No other had taken the loyalty oath so literally. Weltner described Maddox as "the very symbol of violence and repression". Nevertheless, Maddox was chosen governor by the state legislature as a result of a general election impasse with Callaway and former Governor Ellis Arnall, who received critical votes as a write-in candidate. Maddox ridiculed Weltner for abandoning the House race: "Anyone who would give up his seat in Congress is sick". Conversely, both U.S. Senator Robert F. Kennedy and civil rights movement leader Martin Luther King Jr., hailed Weltner's courage for rejecting Maddox. The Macon Telegraph decreed Weltner "a public servant greatly to be admired". The Savannah Morning News termed Weltner "a man of principle" but repudiated his "foolhardy liberalism".

Callaway expressed "amusement" over the "foolish" loyalty oath and questioned whether Weltner withdrew from the race because he feared the Republican Fletcher Thompson, a state senator from Atlanta, would unseat him. Later Callaway referred to his House colleague Weltner as "courageous", but Weltner dismissed Southern Republicans at that time as "Dixiecrats in button-down shirts". Weltner said Callaway viewed Georgia as "a giant company store".

=== Campaign to regain seat ===
Weltner tried to regain his seat in 1968 on the Humphrey–Muskie ticket but lost to his Republican successor, Fletcher Thompson. He was defeated 55.6%–44.4%. In 1973, Weltner ran for mayor of Atlanta but finished third behind incumbent Sam Massell and the eventual winner, Vice Mayor Maynard Jackson.

== Judicial career ==
After leaving politics, Weltner continued his legal career, first as a judge in the Fulton County Superior Court from 1976 to 1981 and then serving as an associate justice of the Supreme Court of Georgia from 1981 to 1992. He was appointed to the Supreme Court by Governor George Busbee in October 1981, to succeed retired Justice Hiram K. Undercofler. In June 1992, Weltner was elected as chief justice of that body by his fellow justices, and he served in that role until his death in Atlanta on August 31, 1992, of esophageal cancer that had been diagnosed two years earlier.

== Awards ==
In 1991, Weltner became the second person to be honored with the John F. Kennedy Profile in Courage Award, the first having been former U.S. Representative Carl Elliott of Alabama. That same year, Weltner received an honorary Doctor of Humane Letters degree from his alma mater Oglethorpe University. An honoris causa inductee of Omicron Delta Kappa in 1969, he was honored with Omicron Delta Kappa's highest honor, the Laurel Crowned Circle Award, for excellence in leadership in 1992.

== Electoral history ==
Georgia's 5th congressional district:

Year	Republican	Votes	%	Democratic	Votes	%
1962	L. J. O'Callaghan	48,466	44.4%	√ Charles L. Weltner	60,583	55.6%
1964	L. J. O'Callaghan	55,983	46.0%	√ Charles L. Weltner	65,803	54.0%
1968	√ Fletcher Thompson	79,258	55.6%	Charles L. Weltner	63,183	44.4%

== See also ==
- List of members of the House Un-American Activities Committee

U.S. House of Representatives
Preceded by James C. Davis	Member of the U.S. House of Representatives from Georgia's 5th congressional district January 3, 1963 – January 3, 1967	Succeeded by Fletcher Thompson
