= Jonathan Lee Riches =

American fraudster (born 1976)

- Born: 1976 or 1977 (age 49–50); Philadelphia, Pennsylvania, U.S.
- Known for: Litigiousness

Jonathan Lee Riches is a convicted fraudster known for the many lawsuits he has filed in various United States district courts. Riches was incarcerated at Federal Medical Center, Lexington, Kentucky, for wire fraud under the terms of a plea bargain. His release date was April 30, 2012. He was arrested for violating his federal probation in December 2012, when he left the Eastern District of the state of Pennsylvania without permission. He drove to Connecticut and impersonated the uncle of Adam Lanza, the shooter in the Sandy Hook Elementary School incident.

== History ==
Since January 8, 2006, he has filed over 2600 lawsuits, some of which have received considerable press attention. Among the more famous defendants of his lawsuits are New England Patriots coach Bill Belichick, former President of the United States George W. Bush, former Attorney General of the United States Janet Reno, Martha Stewart, NASCAR driver Jeff Gordon, former Atlanta Falcons quarterback Michael Vick, entrepreneur Steve Jobs, celebrity blogger Perez Hilton, Somali pirates, and pop star Britney Spears. He also sued the late Benazir Bhutto, Pervez Musharraf, and the Immigration and Naturalization Service on November 7, 2007, to prevent him from being deported to Pakistan and tortured upon his release from prison in March 2012. There is no known evidence of any attempt to deport Riches.

On April 9, 2008, Riches filed a request for a temporary restraining order in a US District Court against Grand Theft Auto publisher Take-Two, developer Rockstar Games, FCI Williamsburg, and Grand Theft Auto itself, claiming that the defendants "put me in prison." The inmate stated, "Defendants contributed to Plaintiff committing identity theft. Defendant's games show sex, drugs and violence which offends me." Riches continued, "Defendants put me in prison. I face imminent danger from violent inmates who played Grand Theft Auto who will knock me out and take my gold Jesus cross."

Riches attempted to intervene as a plaintiff in the Madoff investment scandal, claiming that he "met Bernard Madoff on eharmony.com in 2001" and taught Madoff identity theft skills.

In May 2009, Riches filed for an injunction against the Guinness Book of World Records, seeking to stop them from listing him as "the most litigious individual in history". Guinness spokeswoman Sara Wilcox told The Huffington Post that there was no such listing, and no plan to create one. "'Most litigious man' is not something Guinness World Records has ever monitored as a record category," she said. The action—like the vast majority of Riches's filings—was dismissed.

Some of Riches's defendants are not even persons subject to suit. These include "Adolf Hitler's National Socialist Party" and the "13 tribes of Israel." One lawsuit, in which George W. Bush was the first-named defendant, also includes another 790 defendants that cover 57 pages. They include Plato, Nostradamus, Che Guevara, James Hoffa, "Various Buddhist Monks," all survivors of the Holocaust, the Lincoln Memorial, the Eiffel Tower, the USS Cole, the book Mein Kampf, the Garden of Eden, the Roman Empire, the Appalachian Trail, Plymouth Rock, the Holy Grail, Nordic gods, the dwarf planet Pluto, and the entire Three Mile Island accident.

A number of Riches's lawsuits have been dismissed as being "frivolous, malicious" or for failure to state a claim upon which relief could be granted. Willis Hunt, the U.S. District Court Judge who dismissed Riches's suit against Vick as "farcical," opined that his lawsuits were clearly self-promotional. As per 28 U.S. Code § 1915(g), he is barred from proceeding in forma pauperis.

In July 2018, Riches was indicted by a federal grand jury in Arizona. He is charged with making false statements and other frauds after an attempt to file a lawsuit against Gabby Giffords while posing as Jared Lee Loughner.

A collection of Riches's lawsuits was published on April Fools' Day of 2016.

In November 2018, Riches self-published Nothing is Written in Stone: A Jonathan Lee Riches Companion, which contains a selection of his lawsuits as well as an autobiography. Riches runs a YouTube channel, "JLR Investigates", where he claims to be an investigative reporter.

== See also ==
- Vexatious litigation
- Frivolous litigation
