= Richard Bell (Georgia judge) =

American judge (1920–2005)

Richard Bell (July 5, 1920 – November 28, 2005) was a justice of the Supreme Court of Georgia from 1982 to 1992.

Bell received his J.D. from Emory University School of Law in 1949, and in 1950 was elected to the Georgia House of Representatives. He served as district attorney of DeKalb County, Georgia, from 1956 to 1976, and was elected as a judge of the Georgia Superior Court in 1980. In 1982, he was elected as a justice of the state supreme court, succeeding Robert H. Jordan, and served until his retirement from the court on December 15, 1992, citing his age and desire to enjoy family and retirement. At the time of his retirement, he was the only member of the court who had initially joined the court by election rather than appointment.

In August 1954, Bell married Naomi Whittemore of Decatur, Georgia, with whom he had four children.

Political offices
Preceded by Robert H. Jordan	Justice of the Supreme Court of Georgia; 1982–1992	Succeeded by George H. Carley
