= William Franklin Jenkins =

American judge (1876–1961)

William Franklin Jenkins (September 7, 1876 – December 4, 1961) was an American judge. He was a justice of the Supreme Court of Georgia from 1936 to 1948, and chief justice from 1947 to 1948.

Born in Webster County, Georgia, Jenkins attended the public schools of Eatonton, Georgia and the University of Virginia. He received a law degree from the University of Georgia in 1896, and entered into the practice of law with his father in Putnam County, Georgia. He served on the Georgia Court of Appeals from 1916 to 1936, and was thereafter appointed to the state supreme court.

An avid reader of classics, Jenkins was a proponent of the Marlovian theory of Shakespeare authorship (that the plays of William Shakespeare were actually written by Christopher Marlowe).

Political offices
| Preceded by S. Price Gilbert | Justice of the Supreme Court of Georgia; 1936–1948 | Succeeded by L. C. Groves |
| Preceded by Robert Charles Bell | Chief Justice of the Supreme Court of Georgia; 1947–1948 | Succeeded by William Henry Duckworth |
