= Bond Almand =

American judge (1894–1985)

Chief Justice of the Supreme Court of Georgia
- In office 1969–1972
- Preceded by: William Henry Duckworth
- Succeeded by: Carlton Mobley

Justice of the Supreme Court of Georgia
- In office 1949–1969
- Preceded by: R. C. Bell
- Succeeded by: Jule Wimberly Felton

Personal details
- Born: January 13, 1894 Lithonia, Georgia, U.S.
- Died: May 13, 1985 (aged 91) Atlanta, Georgia, U.S.
- Education: Emory University; Columbia University (LLB, MA)
- Profession: Politician, judge

Military service
- Allegiance: United States
- Branch/service: United States Army Judge Advocate General's Corps
- Battles/wars: World War I

Bond Almand (January 13, 1894 – May 13, 1985) was a justice of the Supreme Court of Georgia from 1949 to 1969, and chief justice from 1969 to 1972.

Born in Lithonia, Georgia, Almand received his undergraduate degree from Emory University, followed by an LL.B. and an M.A. from Columbia University in 1916. He served in the United States Army Judge Advocate General's Corps corps in Europe during World War I. In the 1920s, he served one term in the Georgia House of Representatives, and later assisted with the drafting of legislation to reorganize the Georgia state government. In 1942, Governor Eugene Talmadge named Almand to the Fulton County Superior Court, where Almand remained until the appointment expired in 1944. In 1946, Governor Ellis Arnall returned Almand to the superior court, where he remained until 1949, when Governor Herman Talmadge elevated Almand to the state supreme court, where Almand served for 23 years.

Almand died at his home in Atlanta, at the age of 91.

Political offices
Preceded by R. C. Bell	Justice of the Supreme Court of Georgia; 1949–1969	Succeeded by Jule W. Felton
Preceded by William Henry Duckworth	Chief Justice of the Supreme Court of Georgia; 1969–1972	Succeeded by Carlton Mobley
