= Thomas O. Marshall =

American judge (1920–2003)

Thomas Oliver Marshall Jr. (June 24, 1920 – June 12, 2003) was an American lawyer and judge who served as an associate justice of the Supreme Court of Georgia from 1977 to 1986, and as chief justice from 1986 to 1989.

== Early life, education, and military service ==
Born in Americus, Georgia, he attended Emory University before receiving a Bachelor of Science in engineering from the United States Naval Academy in 1941. He served aboard Navy destroyers in the Atlantic and Pacific theaters of World War II, attaining the rank of lieutenant commander in that conflict, and later"commanded a destroyer in the Korean War". He received the Bronze Star Medal.

He received a law degree from the University of Georgia School of Law in 1948, and entered the practice of law in Americus.

== Judicial career ==
Marshall was elected to the Georgia Superior Court in 1960. In 1962, Marshall notably ruled that there had been "a clear case of election fraud" in the Sumter County state senate race, awarding the election to Carter Marshall.

In 1974, Marshall was elected to the Georgia Court of Appeals, and on June 30, 1977, Governor George Busbee named Marshall to a seat on the state supreme court vacated by the resignation of Justice G. Conley Ingram.

On February 26, 1986, Marshall was named by his colleagues on the state supreme court as the state's new chief justice, succeeding retiring Chief Justice Harold N. Hill. He retired from the court in 1989.

== Personal life and death ==
On December 20, 1946, Marshall married Angie Ellen Fitts of Macon, Georgia, with whom he had three daughters.

Marshall died at Sumter Regional Hospital at the age of 82, following complications from surgery there.

Political offices
Preceded by G. Conley Ingram	Justice of the Supreme Court of Georgia; 1977–1986	Succeeded by Willis B. Hunt Jr.
Preceded by Harold N. Hill	Chief Justice of the Supreme Court of Georgia; 1986–1989	Succeeded by Robert Benham
