= Leah Ward Sears =

American judge from Georgia (born 1955)

Leah Sears
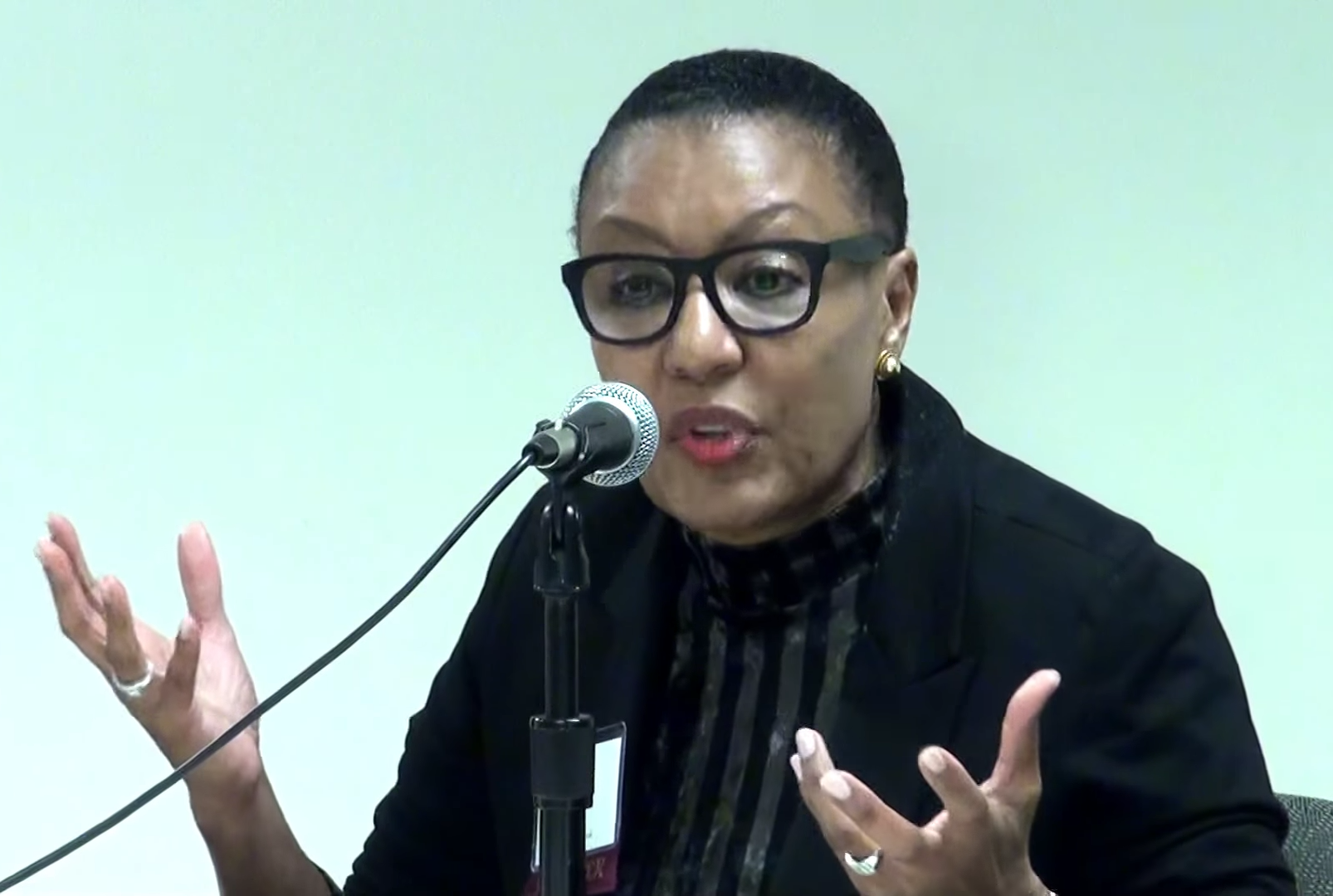

27th Chief Justice of the Georgia Supreme Court
- In office June 28, 2005 – June 30, 2009
- Appointed by: Zell Miller
- Preceded by: Norman Fletcher
- Succeeded by: Carol Hunstein

Associate Justice of the Georgia Supreme Court
- In office July 21, 1992 – June 28, 2005
- Appointed by: Zell Miller
- Succeeded by: David Nahmias

Personal details
- Born: Leah Jeanette Sears; June 13, 1955 (age 71) Heidelberg, West Germany
- Spouse(s): Love Collins (divorced 1994); Haskell Ward
- Education: Cornell University (BA); Emory University (JD); University of Virginia (LLM)

Leah Ward Sears (née Leah Jeanette Sears; born June 13, 1955) is an American jurist and former chief justice of the Supreme Court of Georgia. Sears was the first African-American female chief justice of a state supreme court in the United States. When she was first appointed as justice in 1992 by Governor Zell Miller, she became the first woman and youngest person to sit on Georgia's Supreme Court.

== Early life and education ==
Leah Ward Sears was born in Heidelberg, Germany, to United States Army Colonel Thomas E. Sears and Onnye Jean Sears. The family eventually settled in Savannah, Georgia, where she attended and graduated from Beach High School.

Sears received a B.S. from Cornell University in 1976, her Juris Doctor from Emory University School of Law in 1980, and a Master of Laws from the University of Virginia School of Law in 1995. At Cornell, Sears became a member of Alpha Kappa Alpha sorority and the Quill and Dagger society. She holds honorary degrees from Morehouse College, Clark Atlanta University, LaGrange College, Piedmont College, and Spelman College.

== Professional career ==
After graduating from law school, Sears was an attorney from 1980 until 1985 with the Atlanta law firm Alston & Bird. For many years she was also an adjunct Professor of Law at Emory University School of Law. She also taught at the University of Georgia School of Law.

=== Judicial career ===
Sears was appointed by Mayor Andrew Young to the City of Atlanta Traffic Court in 1985. She then became a Superior Court judge in 1988, becoming the first African-American woman to hold that position in the state.

Sears was appointed as a state Supreme Court justice in 1992. Twelve years later, in what is historically a non-partisan election, the Georgia Republican Party and Georgia Christian Coalition targeted Sears for defeat in 2004. However, she easily defeated her challenger with 62 percent of the vote, and became Chief Justice of the Court in June 2005.

Sears announced in October 2008 that she would resign from the state Supreme Court at the end of June 2009 when her term as Chief Justice ended.

=== Academia and private legal practice ===
Following her resignation from the Court, Sears was named as one of five finalists to become dean of the University of Maryland School of Law. However, in February 2009, Sears withdrew her name from consideration. Sears then taught courses in family law at the University of Georgia Law School and accepted a fellowship at the Institute for American Values.

On May 13, 2009, Sears announced that she would join the Atlanta offices of the law firm Schiff Hardin, with emphasis on appellate work and white-collar crime. "I'm going full steam ahead," Sears told the Atlanta Journal-Constitution. At the time, Sears was thought to be in consideration for a U.S. Supreme Court vacancy.

On September 16, 2016, Justice Sears announced her move from Schiff Hardin to Smith, Gambrell & Russell, with a focus on appellate litigation and commercial disputes. The chairman and managing partner of Smith, Gambrell, Stephen Forte, said: "We are thrilled to have Justice Sears join our firm. Not only is Justice Sears a preeminent attorney and jurist, she also possesses the leadership qualities that enhance the culture and profile or our law firm."

In October 2016, she joined the law firm of Smith, Gambrell & Russell, LLP in Atlanta, Georgia and has served as a partner since then.

In December 2016, Sears was featured in Balancing the Scales, a documentary that explores the history of women in law. Topics range from discrimination to work life balance, what it takes to become a partner in today's firms, and what we need to change for women to break the glass ceiling and really have a seat at the table where society wide decisions are made.

In May 2025, Sears was appointed interim president of Emory University and served from September 2025 to August 2026. The then-President, Dr. Gregory Fenves, transitioned to the role of Chancellor at Emory University at that time.

== Personal ==
Sears currently lives in Atlanta, Georgia with her husband Haskell Ward, former Deputy Mayor of New York City under Mayor Ed Koch. She is the mother of Addison Sears-Collins and Brennan Sears-Collins. Sears and her first husband, Love Collins III, divorced in 1994.

Sears is friends with Supreme Court justice Clarence Thomas, due to their home towns in southeastern Georgia.

Sears supports legally recognizing same-sex marriages.

The Georgia Historical Society holds the Leah Ward Sears papers, a collection that includes clippings, photographs, awards, correspondence, writings authored by Sears, and other materials that date from 1980 to 2009. A 2017 book published by the University of Georgia Press, Justice Leah Ward Sears: Seizing Serendipity, tells the story of Sears' life.

== Notable decisions ==
=== First Amendment ===
- Sears wrote a dissent in the case of Howard v. State (2000). The majority of the court rejected challenges based on right-to-privacy and first amendment considerations to a Georgia statute that criminalized the solicitation of sodomy. In her dissent, Sears stated that she would have found the statute unconstitutional because it prohibited solicitation of legal (consensual; non-paid for) sodomy. Sears saw this as a "content-based" speech restriction that could have no legitimate purpose because sodomy itself is legal.
- Sears wrote a dissent in the case of Club Southern Burlesque v. City of Carrollton (1995). The majority concluded that an ordinance placing various restrictions and limitations on strip clubs did not violate the First Amendment because the restrictions were "content-neutral" and the ordinance furthered important government interests unrelated to speech—for example, pernicious secondary effects as documented in studies commissioned by other municipalities. Sears dissented, arguing that City cannot simply reference other cities' studies to establish its important governmental interest.

=== Fourth Amendment ===
- In Fox v. State (2000), Sears held that the warrantless search of a probationer's house by a police officer (as opposed to a probation officer) was unconstitutional.
- Sears wrote a dissent in the case of Reaves v. State (2008). The case involved the legitimacy of a warrant that authorized a search for evidence of murder and cruelty to children. Sears argued that the words "notes" and "papers", which were listed on the warrant as specific items that could be sought under its terms, "lacked sufficient detail to satisfy the particularity requirement of the Fourth Amendment."
- Sears wrote a dissent in LaFontaine v. State (1998). Sears would have held an alcohol-check roadblock an unconstitutional search/seizure because, in her view, the particular roadblock allowed individual officers too much discretion -- "field officers had the discretion to control the time, the place, and the duration of the road block." At the same time that she argued on the grounds that officers were given too much discretion, she noted that the officers in the case were required by supervisors' policy to stop every car when they put the road block into effect.
- Sears concurred with the majority in Franks v. State (1997). When a suspect was booked, the booking officer asked him how he got a bloody wound that the booking officer observed. Majority concluded this question amounted to the illicit practice of "custodial interrogation" and said that no exception from rules governing custodial interrogation can be made for medical questions like this at booking. Sears concluded that booking officer can ask medical questions designed to determine if suspect needs medical attention, but that this question was too broad for any "medical question" exception.

=== Sixth Amendment ===
- Sears dissented from the majority in Gibson v. Turpin (1999). The majority held that, as with non-death cases, there is no federal or state constitutional right to state-appointed and funded counsel for habeas corpus proceedings for murderers sentenced to death. Sears would have found that such a right to appointed counsel exists for habeas proceedings for capital defendants. Sears stated: "The official taking of a human life is the ultimate government exercise of control and power over individual liberty. If it is to be done, it must be done cautiously, dispassionately, soberly, and fairly. And fundamental fairness demands that a condemned prisoner have the benefit of competent counsel [on habeas]."

=== Eighth Amendment ===
- Sears dissented from the majority's opinion in State v. Davis (2008). The Georgia Supreme Court denied (4–3) the second habeas petition filed by a convicted cop-killer. The habeas petition was based on affidavits of supposed witness recantations. In her dissent, Sears acknowledged procedural bars to considering these affidavits but advocated loosening procedural bars where there are claims of innocence in death penalty cases. The United States Supreme Court denied certiorari.
- In Wilson v. State (2007) Sears held that the Eighth Amendment precluded a ten-year prison sentence for a teenager convicted of child molestation based on an act of oral sodomy.
- Sears dissented from the majority opinion in the case of Wilson v. State (1999). Sears argued that death by electrocution is unconstitutional and inconsistent with evolving standards of decency. Alternatively, she would have held the decision until the United States Supreme Court addressed the issue in a case it was then considering.
- Sears dissented from every death-by-electrocution decision until a majority of the Georgia Supreme Court declared it violated the Georgia Constitution in 2001. Dawson v. State, 274 Ga. 327 (2001) (concurring). Sears agreed with the majority and held that death by electric chair violates the Georgia constitution.

=== Due process ===
- Sears dissented from the majority's opinion in Hill v. Head (2003). Sears would have struck down on due process grounds a Georgia law requiring murderers sentenced to death to prove intellectual disability beyond a reasonable doubt (in order to escape the death penalty). Sears argued that due process, pursuant to the 14th Amendment, requires that the burden of proof on the murderer be no more than a preponderance of the evidence.
- Sears dissented from the majority's opinion in Lumpkin v. Johnson (1998). Sears argued to overturn a murder conviction after concluding that the system by which cases are assigned to trial judges is impermissible.
- Sears dissented from the majority's opinion in McIntyre v. State (1995). Sears argued that the defendant's murder conviction should have been overturned because a judge was substituted in the middle of trial.
- Sears concurred with the majority in Powell v. State (1998). The majority concluded that Georgia sodomy statute that criminalized "private, unforced, non-commercial acts of sexual intimacy between persons legally able to consent" infringed on the "right to privacy" implied in the Georgia constitution. Sears concurred to discuss the responsibility of courts to protect constitutional rights against morals legislation from the majority.

=== General criminal matters ===
- Sears dissented from the majority opinion in Morrison v. State (2006). Sears would have reversed conviction of persons for drugs and firearms offenses because the State failed to comply with the Interstate Agreement on Detainers. As the Chief Justice recognized, however, the vast majority of State courts have upheld convictions where the IAD is not literally followed.

=== Government accountability ===
- Phillips v. Hanse (2006).

=== Taxation ===
- Johnstone v. Thompson (2006). In contrast to the majority, which held that using tax dollars collected from a special purpose tax that did not include providing all middle and high school students with laptops, Sears argued in her dissent, along with Harold Melton, that allocating tax proceeds for laptops was not an abuse of discretion.

=== Election law ===
- O'Kelley v. Cox (2004). In contrast to the majority, which held that citizens have no right to invoke the power of the judiciary to enjoin the enactment of a proposed constitutional amendment because the judiciary is vested with the power to determine the constitutionality of legislation, not the constitutionality of resolutions still in the legislative process of enactment. Sears argued in her dissent, along with Robert Benham, that the judiciary has the power to enjoin the proposed amendment because the Georgia constitution prohibits ballot measures that amend the Georgia Constitution in multiple ways under the single subject rule.

=== SCOTUS reviews ===
- State v. Davis (2008). The Georgia Supreme Court denied (4–3) the second habeas petition filed by a person convicted of killing a police officer based on affidavits of several witness recantations. In her dissent, Sears acknowledged procedural bars to considering these affidavits but advocated loosening procedural bars where there are claims of innocence in death penalty cases. The United States Supreme Court denied certiorari.
- State v. Randolph (2004). Sears joined a 4–3 majority that found that the consent of one resident to search common spaces is not effective when the other resident is present and explicitly refuses consent. The United States Supreme Court affirmed the state Supreme Court majority.
- Greene v. State (1996). Sears dissented in this capital case. She argued that the dismissal of several jurors who had "qualms" about the death penalty was incorrect. The United States Supreme Court unanimously agreed with Sears and reversed, holding the majority applied an incorrect legal standard for juror dismissals.
- Reich v. Collins, 1992 and 1993. The Georgia Supreme Court concluded that a state taxpayer could not get a refund for taxes he paid under a valid state tax law that was later invalidated by the Supreme Court. The Supreme Court remanded in light of a recently decided case requiring such a refund unless the state had a clear and exclusive pre-deprivation procedure for contesting taxes. The Georgia Supreme Court again denied a refund, arguing it had such a scheme. Sears joined a dissent that would have provided a refund. The Supreme Court reversed, saying Georgia's pre-deprivation scheme was not clearly exclusive, and thus taxpayer must be allowed to pursue a refund action. [See 513 U.S. 106 (1994).]

== Judicial Review of Superior Court decisions ==
During the time that Sears sat as a Superior Court judge, eleven cases in which she rendered a verdict were ultimately reviewed by the Georgia Supreme Court. In three of the eleven cases (or 27% of the time), Sears was reversed.

- Wright v. Robinson (1993). Superior Court Judge Sears had concluded that a medical malpractice claimant can voluntarily dismiss a claim and refile it within six months, even when the later filed claim is untimely. The state Supreme Court reversed.
- Robinson v. State (1991). The Georgia Supreme Court concluded that Superior Court Judge Sears erred by failing to give a "circumstantial evidence" instruction in a case where there was direct evidence of crime, but witness supplying direct evidence had been impeached.

== 2004 election campaign ==
In 2004, Sears ran for re-election against challenger Grant Brantley. During the election campaign, Sears was characterized by conservative opponents as an activist judge.

Her campaign raised $553,666 and has spent $264,535.

- Sears: 745,011, or 62.3%
- Brantley: 451,320, or 37.7%

The Sears–Brantley election contest was the first in the state to be conducted under rules that allow opposing candidates to discuss legal issues and each other's records. Until 2004, a restriction existed that forbade discussion of candidates' records or other issues. George Weaver, who tried unsuccessfully to unseat Sears in 1998, brought a successful lawsuit to end that restriction.

== Career history, organization memberships, and awards ==
=== Career history ===
- Alston & Bird Attorneys at Law, Atlanta, Georgia, lawyer, 1980–1985
- City Court of Atlanta, traffic court judge, 1985–1987
- Fulton Superior Court, Atlanta, judge, 1988–1992
- State Supreme Court of Georgia, justice, 1992–2009
- Founder of Battered Women's Project of Columbus, Georgia

=== Organization membership ===
- National Association of Women's Judges
- Georgia Association of Black Women Attorneys(founding president)
- Chair, Chief Justice's Commission on Professionalism
- Chair, Supreme Court Commission on Civil Justice
- Chair, Supreme Court's Commission on Marriage, Children and Families
- Georgia Tech Advisory Board
- The Links
- Alpha Kappa Alpha sorority
- Georgia Historical Society Board of Curators
- The Carter Center, Board of Trustees
- Emory University, Board of Trustees

=== Awards ===
- NAACP award for community service
- 2006 Trumpet Award—Law
- 2008 Honoree—Second Annual Wayne A. McCoy Memorial Historymaker's Program
- 2007–2009 Rosalynn Carter Fellow in Public Policy
- Leadership Atlanta

== See also ==
- Barack Obama Supreme Court candidates
- List of African-American jurists
- List of female state supreme court justices
- Troy Davis case
- Savannah Women of Vision

Legal offices
| Preceded by Norman Fletcher | Chief Justice of the Supreme Court of Georgia; 2005–2009 | Succeeded by Carol Hunstein |
