= Leland James O'Callaghan =

American businessman and politician (1915–1997)

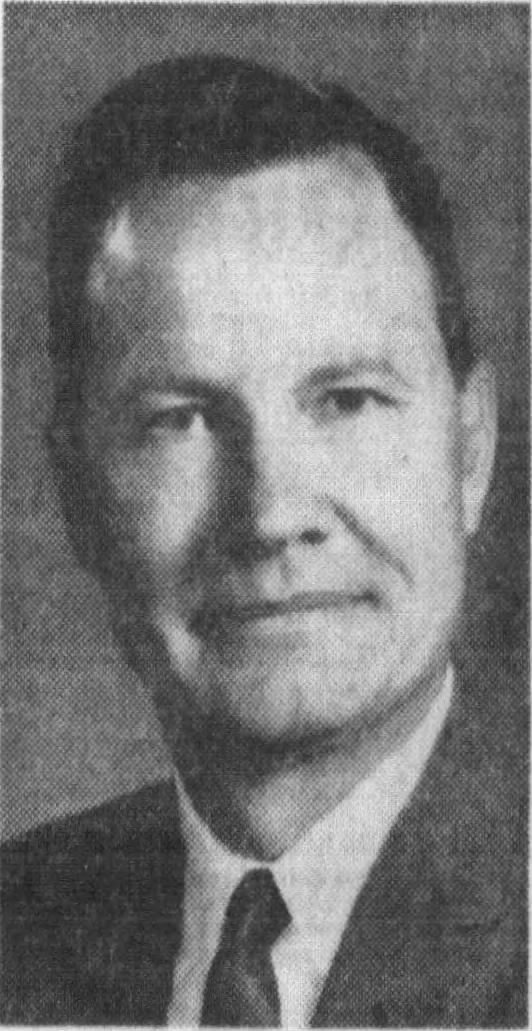

President of the Atlanta Board of Education
- In office 1959–1961

Personal details
- Born: June 17, 1915 Atlanta, Georgia, U.S.
- Died: January 22, 1997 (aged 81) Jacksonville, Florida, U.S.
- Party: Republican
- Spouse: Mary Mees (m. 1941)
- Children: 6
- Education: Georgia Tech

Military service
- Branch/service: United States Army; United States Air Forces; United States Air Force; Georgia Air National Guard
- Battles/wars: World War II

Leland James O'Callaghan (June 17, 1915 – January 22, 1997) was an American businessman and politician from Georgia. He was an important civic leader, businessman, and political leader from Atlanta.

== Early life ==
O'Callaghan was born on June 17, 1915, in Atlanta, Georgia. He attended the Atlanta public schools, and in 1937, graduated from Georgia Tech. He served in the Air Force during World War II where he rose to the rank of Lieutenant Colonel. He later served as a Colonel in the Georgia Air National Guard. In 1946, he founded the Dealers Supply Co., which he served as president. He was elected to the Atlanta Board of Education as a representative of the 5th Ward in 1957. In 1959, he was president of the Atlanta Board of Education for two years, which was caught in the turmoil of school integration at the time. During the Massive Resistance, in contrast to fellow Southerners, he resisted pressure to close the schools and insisted they remain open. Despite the backlash from his friends and other board members, he successfully achieved integration without incident.

== Political career ==
O'Callaghan began his political career when he ran for the State Legislature in 1956 against Hoke Smith. In 1962, he ran for Congress in Georgia's 5th congressional district. He expected to run against Democratic incumbent James C. Davis, but Davis lost the primary to Weltner in the primary on September 26. In his campaign, he ran as an "Eisenhower Republican," and a fiscally conservative platform. He pledged to cut taxes, defend the free enterprise system, and "establish faith in the individual as the foundation of our national life." On racial issues, he "vowed to represent all the people of the Fifth district." Despite O'Callaghan being endorsed by the Atlanta Daily World, Weltner defeated him by 10,000 votes. O'Callaghan had received 30% of the Black vote, whereas Weltner received 70%.

In 1964, he ran again in the same district, facing Charles L. Weltner a second time. O'Callaghan ran to the right as a Goldwater Republican. He advocated for the repeal of the public accommodations and fair employment practices of the Civil Rights Act of 1964, although he qualified his statement. However, he refused to run an overt segregationist campaign. On October 19, he issued a statement declaring he would be more inclined to support the civil rights bill if the fair employment provisions included every business in the country. He also urged voters to comply with the Civil Rights Act once it became the law. His campaign also focused its attacks on Governor Sanders, Mayor Allen, and President Johnson. In the general election, O'Callaghan lost by a margin of 18,966 votes.

== Electoral history ==
Georgia's 5th congressional district:

Year	Republican	Votes	%	Democratic	Votes	%
1962	L. J. O'Callaghan	48,466	44.4%	√ Charles L. Weltner	60,583	55.6%
1964	L. J. O'Callaghan	55,983	46.0%	√ Charles L. Weltner	65,803	54.0%

== Personal life ==
He married his wife, Mary Mees, on June 14, 1941. Together, they had five daughters and one son. He died in Jacksonville, Florida, on January 22, 1997, aged 81 due to a stroke.
