= Keith R. Blackwell =

American judge (born 1975)

Keith Blackwell
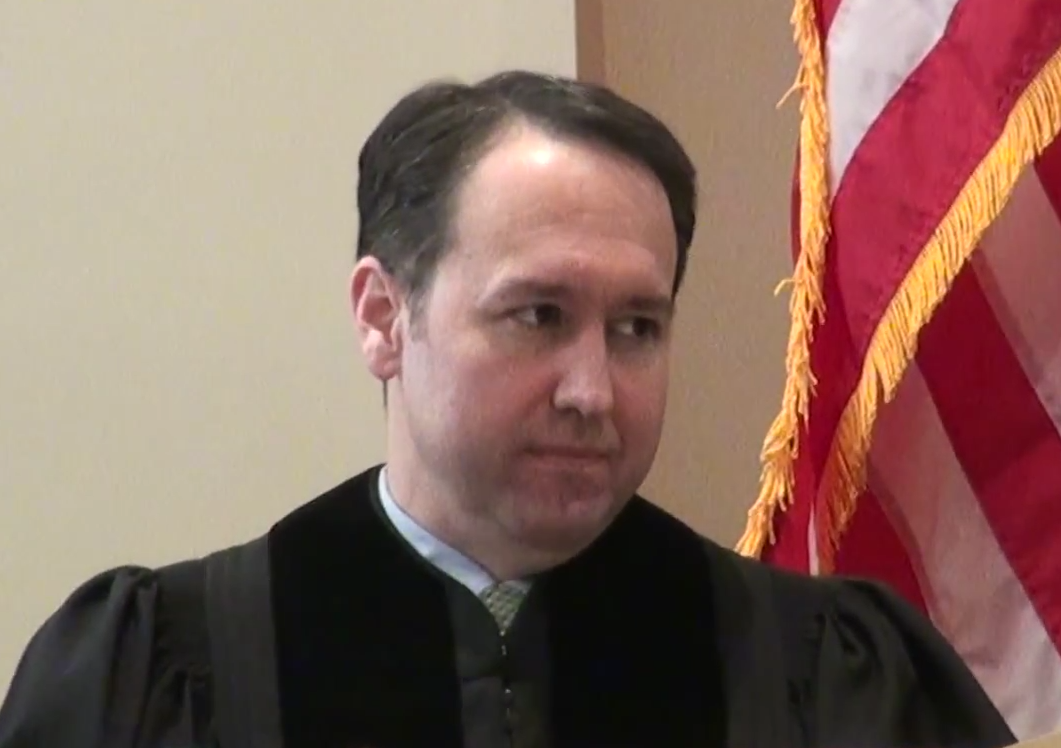
- Blackwell in 2017

Associate Justice of the Supreme Court of Georgia
- In office July 19, 2012 – November 18, 2020
- Appointed by: Nathan Deal
- Preceded by: George Carley
- Succeeded by: Shawn Ellen LaGrua

Judge of the Georgia Court of Appeals
- In office November 1, 2010 – July 19, 2012
- Appointed by: Sonny Perdue
- Preceded by: G. Alan Blackburn
- Succeeded by: William M. Ray II

Personal details
- Born: July 4, 1975 (age 51) Cherokee County, Georgia, U.S.
- Party: Republican
- Education: University of Georgia (BA, JD)

Keith Robert Blackwell (born July 4, 1975) is a former Associate Justice of the Supreme Court of Georgia.

== Education ==
Blackwell received his Bachelor of Arts in political science from the University of Georgia in 1996 and his Juris Doctor from the University of Georgia School of Law in 1999.

== Judicial career ==
He was a judge of the Georgia Court of Appeals, to which he was appointed by Governor Sonny Perdue on November 1, 2010. He was later named to the Supreme Court of Georgia by Governor Nathan Deal on June 25, 2012. On February 28, 2020, Blackwell announced his intention to resign, effective November 18, 2020.

== Possible appointment to U.S. Supreme Court ==
In September 2016, he was named as a possible Supreme Court of the United States nominee by Donald Trump.

== Electoral history ==
2014

Georgia Supreme Court Results, May 20, 2014
Party	Candidate	Votes	%
Nonpartisan	Keith R. Blackwell (incumbent)	719,530	100.00%
Majority		719,530	100.00%
Total votes		719,530	100.00%

== See also ==
- Donald Trump Supreme Court candidates

Legal offices
Preceded by G. Alan Blackburn	Judge of the Georgia Court of Appeals; 2010–2012	Succeeded by William McCrary Ray II
Preceded by George Carley	Associate Justice of the Supreme Court of Georgia; 2012–2020	Succeeded by Shawn Ellen LaGrua
