= Atlanta Board of Education =

Elected governing body of Atlanta Public Schools

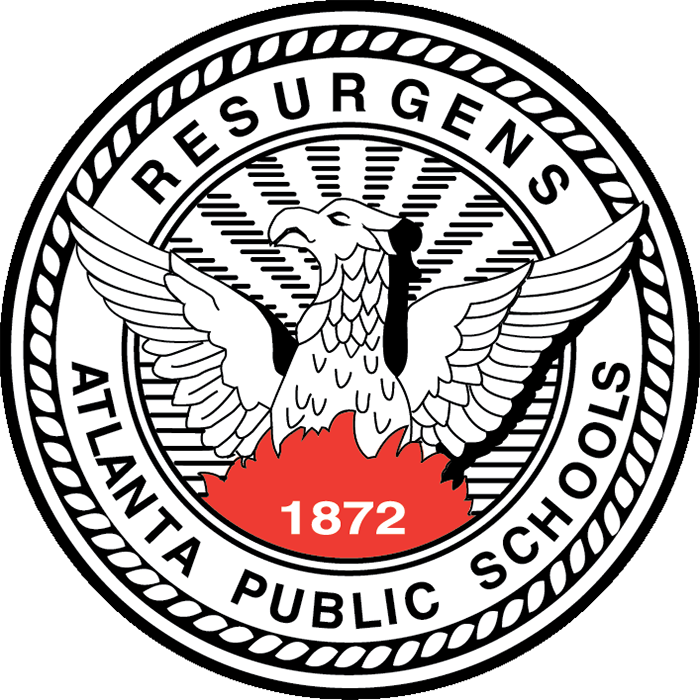

Leadership
- Chair: Erika Mitchell
- Vice-Chair: Jennifer McDonald

Structure
- Seats: 9 seats: 6 district seats 3 at-large seats
- Length of term: four-year term Chair and Vice-Chair elected by board every two years
- Salary: $22,500

Elections
- Last general election: Tuesday, Nov. 7, 2023
- Next general election: 2025

Website
- Official website

The Atlanta Board of Education is the governing body of Atlanta Public Schools. The board has nine members: six are elected by geographical districts and three are elected citywide. All serve four-year terms.

While the board establishes and approves policies that govern the school system, the day-to-day administration of the school district is the responsibility of the Superintendent, who is appointed by the board.

== Members ==
- Katie Howard (District 1)
- Arreta L. Baldon (District 2)
- Ken Zeff (District 3)
- Jennifer McDonald (District 4 and Vice Chair)
- Erika Y. Mitchell (District 5 and Board Chair)
- Tolton Pace (District 6)
- Alfred “Shivy” Brooks (at-large, Seat 7)
- Cynthia Briscoe Brown (at-large, Seat 8)
- Jessica Johnson (at-large, Seat 9)

== Compensation ==
Board members are paid an annual salary of $22,500 ($24,500 for the Chair and $23,500 for the Vice Chair). Compensation increased to $22,500 ($24,500 for the Chair and $23,500 for the Vice Chair) on January 1, 2022.

== Notable former members ==
- Leland James O'Callaghan, president of the Atlanta Board of Education from 1959 to 1961
- Benjamin Mays, former president of the Atlanta Board of Education and Morehouse College
- Eugene Mitchell, former president of the Atlanta Board of Education
- Rufus Early Clement, first Black elected official in Atlanta since Reconstruction, president of Clark Atlanta University
- Jason Esteves, at-large member (2014–2022) and chair of the board (2018–2021)
