= John J. Ellington =

American judge (born 1960)

John Ellington

Associate Justice of the Supreme Court of Georgia
- Incumbent
- Assumed office December 19, 2018
- Preceded by: Carol W. Hunstein

Judge of the Georgia Court of Appeals
- In office July 12, 1999 – December 19, 2018
- Appointed by: Roy Barnes
- Succeeded by: Ken Hodges

Personal details
- Born: October 26, 1960 (age 65) Vidalia, Georgia, U.S.
- Education: University of Georgia (BBA, JD)

John J. Ellington (born October 26, 1960) is an associate justice of the Supreme Court of Georgia and former judge of the Georgia Court of Appeals.

== Early life and education ==
Ellington was born in Vidalia, Georgia on October 1, 1960. He graduated from the University of Georgia with a Bachelor of Business Administration in Accounting in 1982, and from the University of Georgia School of Law with a Juris Doctor in 1985.

== Career ==
Ellington began his career as a general trial lawyer and a partner with the law firm of Andrew, Threlkeld, & Ellington.

=== State court service ===
In 1991, he was appointed to serve as judge of the Treutlen County State Court. He also served as a municipal court judge and later as a superior court judge. He was sworn in as the 66th Judge of the Georgia Court of Appeals by Georgia Governor Roy Barnes on July 12, 1999. He was elected statewide to a full six-year term in 2000 and re-elected in 2006 and 2012.

=== Georgia Supreme Court ===
Ellington was considered in 2016 for one of three seats on the court. In early 2018 Ellington announced his intention to run for the state Supreme Court seat being vacated by retiring Justice Carol W. Hunstein. He was elected, unopposed, on November 6, 2018. He was sworn into office on December 19, 2018.

Legal offices
Preceded by Carol W. Hunstein	Associate Justice of the Supreme Court of Georgia; 2018–present	Incumbent
