= Nels S. D. Peterson =

American judge (born 1978)

Nels Peterson
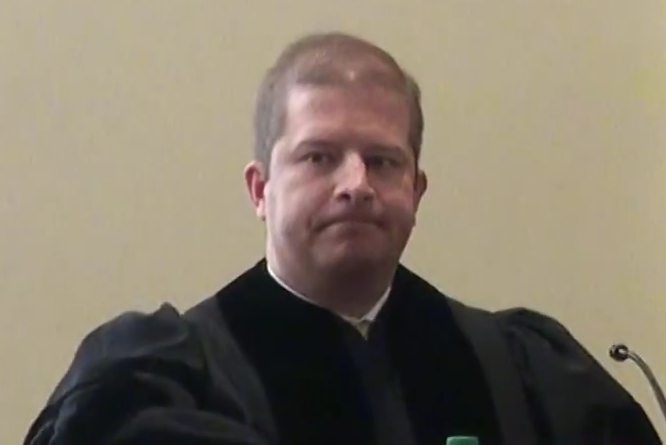

Chief Justice of the Georgia Supreme Court
- Incumbent
- Assumed office April 1, 2025
- Preceded by: Michael P. Boggs

Justice of the Georgia Supreme Court
- Incumbent
- Assumed office January 1, 2017
- Appointed by: Nathan Deal
- Preceded by: Seat established

Personal details
- Born: Nels Stefan David Peterson; September 17, 1978 (age 47)
- Education: Kennesaw State University (BS); Harvard University (JD)

Nels Stefan David Peterson (born September 17, 1978) is an American lawyer serving as the chief justice of the Supreme Court of Georgia. In February 2025, he was elected to serve as chief justice of the court.

== Biography ==
Peterson graduated from Kennesaw State University with a Bachelor of Science in political science and a minor in economics. He received his Juris Doctor from Harvard Law School.

Upon graduation from law school, Peterson served as a law clerk to Judge William H. Pryor Jr. of the United States Court of Appeals for the Eleventh Circuit. He then practiced at King & Spalding in Atlanta, where he focused on securities law, corporate governance, mergers and acquisitions, and appellate law. He was then appointed as former Georgia Governor Sonny Perdue’s Executive Counsel. He then served as Solicitor General of Georgia under the direction of then state Attorney General Sam Olens. He is a member of the Federalist Society.

== Judicial career ==
=== Georgia Court of Appeals ===
Peterson was appointed to the Georgia Court of Appeals by Governor Nathan Deal for a term starting January 1, 2016. He was appointed after the state legislature expanded the composition of the court from 12 to 15 seats. His appointment was considered unconstitutional by some in the legal community, but it was ultimately upheld by the Supreme Court of Georgia.

=== Georgia Supreme Court ===
Governor Nathan Deal appointed Peterson to the Supreme Court of Georgia effective January 1, 2017. He was unanimously selected as presiding justice and sworn in on July 18, 2022. In February 2025, he was elected to serve as chief justice of the court, for a term beginning April 1.

== Personal life ==
Peterson is married to his wife Jennifer and they have two children. They reside in Marietta, Georgia.

== Electoral history ==
2018

Georgia Supreme Court Results, May 22, 2018
Party	Candidate	Votes	%
Nonpartisan	Nels S.D. Peterson (incumbent)	885,265	100.00%
Majority		885,265	100.00%
Total votes		885,265	100.00%

Legal offices
New seat	Associate Justice of the Georgia Supreme Court; 2017–present	Incumbent
Preceded by Michael P. Boggs	Chief Justice of the Georgia Supreme Court; 2025–present	Incumbent
