= Norman S. Fletcher =

American judge

Norman Sears Fletcher (born July 10, 1934) is an American lawyer and jurist from the state of Georgia. He served on the Supreme Court of Georgia for over 15 years and was the Chief Justice of that body from 2001 through 2005.

== Early life and education ==
Fletcher was born in Fitzgerald, Georgia, to Frank Pickett Fletcher and Hattie Sears Fletcher. He attended the University of Georgia where he was a member of the Phi Kappa Literary Society and the Order of the Greek Horsemen, earning an A.B. degree in 1956 and then attended the University of Georgia School of Law earning an LL.B. in 1958. He later earned an LL.M. from the University of Virginia School of Law in 1995.

As a high school student in Fitzgerald, Fletcher became interested in law from two local attorneys, Carlyle McDonald (the mayor of the town and a trial lawyer) and Harvey Jay, a district attorney. After watching McDonald and Jay oppose each other in criminal trials, Fletcher decided to become an attorney.

== Professional career ==
After graduating from law school in 1958, Fletcher joined the law firm of Mathews, Maddox, Walton and Smith in Rome, Georgia. He then moved to LaFayette, Georgia, in 1963 and formed a law firm with Irwin W. Stolz Jr. and George P. Shaw. Fletcher also served as the Lafayette city attorney from 1965 through 1989 and the Walker County, Georgia attorney from 1973 through 1988. From 1979 through 1989, he also was a special assistant attorney general for the state of Georgia.

Fletcher also served in numerous other positions while maintaining his private practice including board member of the Attorney's Title Guaranty Fund from 1971 through 1975, president of the Lookout Mountain Bar Association from 1973 to 1974, president of the University of Georgia Law School Association in 1977, chair of Local Government Section of the State Bar of Georgia from 1977 to 1978), president of the City Attorney's Section of the Georgia Municipal Association from 1978 to 1979, a member of the State Disciplinary Board from 1984 to 1987, chair of the Investigative Panel from 1986 to 1987, board member of LaFayette Chamber of Commerce and president of the LaFayette Rotary Club.

In 1989, Fletcher was appointed to the Supreme Court of Georgia by Governor Joe Frank Harris, to a seat vacated by the retirement of Hardy Gregory Jr. Fletcher was the chief justice of the Court from 2001 until 2005. Fletcher retired from the Court in 2006. He is a fellow of both the American Bar and the Georgia Bar Foundations and is a master in the Joseph Henry Lumpkin Inn of Court.

== Sources ==
- "An Interview with Norman S. Fletcher, Chief Justice, Supreme Court of Georgia" (PDF). Georgia Bar Journal. 7 (4). State Bar of Georgia: pp. 29–35. February 2002.
- Biography on old Supreme Court of Georgia website (accessed December 7, 2006)

Legal offices
Preceded by Robert Benham	Chief Justice of the Supreme Court of Georgia; 2001–2005	Succeeded by Leah Ward Sears
Preceded by Hardy Gregory Jr.	Associate justice of the Supreme Court of Georgia; 1989–2001	Succeeded by Robert Benham
