= William Henry Duckworth =

American judge (1894–1969)

Justice of the Supreme Court of Georgia
- In office 1938–1969

Chief Justice of the Supreme Court of Georgia
- In office 1948–1969
- Preceded by: William Franklin Jenkins
- Succeeded by: Bond Almand

Personal details
- Born: October 21, 1894 Blairsville, Georgia, United States
- Died: August 9, 1969 (aged 74) Decatur, Georgia, United States
- Education: Young Harris College
- Military career
- Allegiance: United States
- Branch: United States Navy Reserve
- Conflicts: World War I

William Henry Duckworth (October 21, 1894 – August 9, 1969) was a justice of the Supreme Court of Georgia from 1938 to 1948, and chief justice from 1948 to 1969.

Born in Blairsville, Georgia to John Francis Duckworth and Laura Jane Woods, Duckworth attended Young Harris College from 1915 to 1917, then served in the United States Navy Reserve during World War I, in 1918. He read law in a law office to be admitted to the State Bar of Georgia in 1919, and engaged in the private practice of law in Cairo, Georgia from 1919 to 1937. He then served as assistant Attorney General of Georgia from 1937 to 1938, when he became an associate justice of the Supreme Court of Georgia. When passed over for an appointment to a vacant seat on the court, Duckworth ran in the Democratic primary and defeated two other candidates for the position.

Duckworth married Willabel Pilcher, with whom he had 3 children. He died in Decatur, Georgia.
