= Carla Wong McMillian =

American judge (born 1973)

Associate Justice of the Supreme Court of Georgia
- Incumbent
- Assumed office April 10, 2020
- Appointed by: Brian Kemp
- Preceded by: Robert Benham

Judge of the Georgia Court of Appeals
- In office January 24, 2013 – April 10, 2020
- Appointed by: Nathan Deal
- Preceded by: Harris Adams
- Succeeded by: Verda Colvin

Personal details
- Born: May 27, 1973 (age 53) Augusta, Georgia, U.S.
- Party: Republican
- Education: Duke University (BA); University of Georgia (JD)

Carla Wong McMillian (born May 27, 1973) is an associate justice of the Supreme Court of Georgia and former judge of the Georgia Court of Appeals.

== Early life and career ==
McMillian was born and raised in Augusta, Georgia. Her paternal grandparents immigrated from southern China to San Francisco then moved to Georgia in the 1910s and opened a grocery store, where her father was born. Her mother emigrated from Hong Kong to marry her dad and Chinese was her first language. McMillian attended Westminster Schools of Augusta, graduating the top of her class. McMillian received her bachelor's degrees in both history and economics from Duke University and her Juris Doctor from the University of Georgia School of Law. She later served as a law clerk to William Clark O'Kelley of the United States District Court for the Northern District of Georgia. She then went on to be a partner with Sutherland Asbill & Brennan LLP.

== Judicial career ==
=== State court service ===
On June 18, 2010 McMillian was one of three candidates recommended by the nominating commission for a vacancy on the Griffin Judicial Circuit. On August 11, 2010 Governor Sonny Perdue appointed McMillan to be a Judge of the Georgia State Court for Fayette County.

=== Georgia Court of Appeals ===
On January 16, 2013 Governor Nathan Deal appointed McMillian to the Georgia Court of Appeals to fill the vacancy created by the resignation of A. Harris Adams. She was sworn into office on January 24, 2013. She is the first Asian Pacific American state appellate judge ever to be appointed in the Southeast. Upon her election in 2014, Judge McMillian became the first Asian American to be elected to a statewide office in Georgia.

=== Georgia Supreme Court ===
In early March 2020, McMillian was submitted as a potential nominee to the governor, along with Judge Verda Colvin, Judge Sara L. Doyle and Judge Shawn LaGrua, all women. On March 27, 2020, Governor Brian Kemp announced his appointment of McMillian to the Supreme Court of Georgia. She fills the seat left vacant by Robert Benham who retired on March 1, 2020. At the time of her appointment, McMillian became the first Asian American woman in the Southeast to be appointed to the state's highest court.

== Personal life ==
She is married to her husband, Lance McMillian, a lawyer and author, and they have two children.

Since 2019, she serves or has served in leadership roles for the Georgia Asian Pacific American Bar Association, the Fayette County Historical Society, the Partnership Against Domestic Violence, the Real Life Center, the Atlanta Chapter of the Federalist Society for Law and Public Policy Studies, the Georgia Legal History Foundation. She is a Republican.

== See also ==
- List of Asian American jurists

Legal offices
Preceded by Robert Benham	Associate Justice of the Supreme Court of Georgia; 2020–present	Incumbent
