= Verda Colvin =

American judge (born 1965)

Associate Justice of the Georgia Supreme Court
- Incumbent
- Assumed office July 29, 2021
- Appointed by: Brian Kemp
- Preceded by: Harold Melton

Judge of the Georgia Court of Appeals
- In office April 10, 2020 – July 28, 2021
- Appointed by: Brian Kemp
- Preceded by: Carla Wong McMillian
- Succeeded by: Andrew Pinson

Personal details
- Born: June 25, 1965 (age 60) Atlanta, Georgia, U.S.
- Education: Sweet Briar College (BA); University of Georgia (JD)

Verda M. Colvin (born June 25, 1965) is an associate justice of the Supreme Court of Georgia and former judge of the Georgia Court of Appeals.

== Education ==
Colvin received her bachelor's degree from Sweet Briar College and her Juris Doctor from the University of Georgia School of Law in 1993.

== Legal career ==
Previously, she served as an Assistant United States Attorney for the Middle District of Georgia, Assistant District Attorney for the Clayton County District Attorney's Office, Assistant General Counsel for Clark Atlanta University, Assistant Solicitor for the Solicitor's Office in Athens-Clarke County, and as an associate for Ferguson, Stein, Watt, Wallas, and Gresham.

== Judicial career ==
=== State court service ===
Colvin was appointed to the Macon Circuit Superior Court by Georgia Governor Nathan Deal on March 24, 2014. A March 25, 2016, address by Colvin to a group of students as part of a “Consider the Consequences” program for at-risk students that Judge Colvin was unaware was being recorded went viral and was viewed hundreds of thousands of times, picked up by local, national and international media, and played by teachers for their students. In June 2019, she was appointed to a state judicial commission.

=== Appointment to Georgia Court of Appeals ===
On March 27, 2020, Governor Brian Kemp appointed Colvin to the Georgia Court of Appeals. She was sworn in on April 10, 2020. She is the state's first African-American female appointed to the Georgia Court of Appeals by a Republican governor.

=== Appointment to Georgia Supreme Court ===
On July 20, 2021, Colvin was appointed to the Supreme Court of Georgia by Governor Brian Kemp, to the seat vacated by justice Harold Melton, who retired on July 1, 2021.

Legal offices
Preceded by Harold Melton	Associate Justice of the Supreme Court of Georgia; 2021–present	Incumbent
