= Marcus Wayland Beck =

American judge

Personal details
- Born: April 28, 1860
- Died: January 21, 1943 (aged 82)

Marcus Wayland Beck (April 28, 1860 – January 21, 1943) was a justice of the Supreme Court of Georgia from 1905 to 1937.

== Life and career ==
Beck was born in Harris County, Georgia, on April 28, 1860, to parents James and Margaret (Wells) Beck. After attending the University of Mississippi and the University of Georgia, and becoming a member of the Phi Delta Theta fraternity, Beck graduated in 1881 with an A.B. Degree and in 1882 with an L.L.D degree. He opened a law practice in Jackson, Georgia after teaching briefly.

Between 1890 and 1898, Beck served as a state senator, a solicitor general, and a superior court judge of the Flint Circuit. In 1898, he resigned his seat to accept a commission as a major and enter the Spanish–American War with the Third Georgia Volunteer Infantry, serving with the occupation of Cuba. At the end of the war he returned to private practice as an attorney until his appointment by Georgia governor Joseph M. Terrell to the Georgia Supreme Court in 1905, a position to which he was later elected at regular terms. He succeeded to presiding justice in October 1917, a position he held until illness forced his retirement in 1937. He is buried next to his wife, Caroline and his son, Marcus Wayland Beck, Jr. in the Jackson City Cemetery.
