= Shawn Ellen LaGrua =

American judge (born 1962)

Associate Justice of the Supreme Court of Georgia
- Incumbent
- Assumed office January 7, 2021
- Appointed by: Brian Kemp
- Preceded by: Keith R. Blackwell

Personal details
- Born: 1962 (age 63–64)
- Education: University of Georgia (BA); Georgia State University (JD)

Shawn Ellen LaGrua (born 1962) is an associate justice of the Georgia Supreme Court.

== Education ==
LaGrua received a Bachelor of Arts in Political Science from the University of Georgia in 1984, and received her Juris Doctor from Georgia State University College of Law in 1987.

== Legal and academic career ==
After her graduation from law school, from 1987 to 1990 she served as an assistant district attorney for DeKalb County; from 1992 to 1999 she as the Senior Assistant District Attorney for Fulton County, from 1999 to 2001 she served as the Chief Assistant District Attorney for the Tallapoosa Circuit. From 2004 to 2007 she served as a Solicitor General for DeKalb County, Georgia. Prior to her elevation to the bench from 2007 to 2010 she was the Inspector General for the Georgia Secretary of State. She is also an adjunct professor at Georgia State University College of Law.

== Judicial career ==
=== Superior Court of Fulton County ===
She was appointed as a Judge of the Fulton County Superior Court in 2010.

=== Georgia Supreme Court ===
LaGrua was one of four finalists being considered for the vacancy. On December 1, 2020, Governor Brian Kemp announced his appointment of LaGrua to be an associate justice of the Supreme Court of Georgia to the seat vacated by Justice Keith R. Blackwell who resigned on November 18, 2020. She was sworn into office on January 7, 2021.

Legal offices
Preceded by Keith R. Blackwell	Associate Justice of the Supreme Court of Georgia; 2021–present	Incumbent
