= Willis B. Hunt Jr. =

American judge (born 1932)

Willis Beverly Hunt Jr.

Senior Judge of the United States District Court for the Northern District of Georgia
- Incumbent
- Assumed office June 30, 2005

Judge of the United States District Court for the Northern District of Georgia
- In office March 24, 1995 – June 30, 2005
- Appointed by: Bill Clinton
- Preceded by: Horace Ward
- Succeeded by: Timothy Batten

Chief Justice of the Georgia Supreme Court
- In office 1994–1995
- Preceded by: Charles L. Weltner
- Succeeded by: Robert Benham

Justice of the Georgia Supreme Court
- In office 1986–1994
- Appointed by: Joe Frank Harris
- Preceded by: Thomas O. Marshall
- Succeeded by: Harris Hines

Personal details
- Born: Willis Beverly Hunt Jr. December 10, 1932 (age 93) Malden, Massachusetts, U.S.
- Education: Emory University (LLB); University of Virginia (LLM)

Willis Beverly Hunt Jr. (born December 10, 1932) is an inactive senior United States district judge of the United States District Court for the Northern District of Georgia.

== Education and career ==
Hunt was born in Malden, Massachusetts. He graduated from Emory University in 1954 with a Bachelor of Laws. While a student at Emory, Hunt became a brother of the Alpha Tau Omega fraternity. After completing his degree, Hunt served in the United States Army from 1955 to 1957, after which he was a special agent with the Federal Bureau of Investigation from 1957 to 1959. Leaving the Bureau, he practiced law privately for thirteen years: in Clearwater, Florida, from 1959 to 1960; in Atlanta, Georgia, from 1960 to 1967; and in the Houston County, Georgia cities of Perry and Warner Robins, from 1967 to 1971. At this time, Hunt re-entered government service, being a judge on the Houston County Superior Court from 1971 to 1986. He unsuccessfully ran for a seat on the Georgia Supreme Court in 1982, finishing fifth out of six in a statewide election. He was appointed by Governor Joe Frank Harris to the Georgia Supreme Court in 1986, to a seat vacated by the elevation of Thomas O. Marshall to chief justice, following the resignation of former Chief Justice Harold N. Hill. During his time on the Georgia Supreme Court, Hunt earned a Master of Laws from the University of Virginia School of Law in 1990.

=== Federal judicial service ===
On January 23, 1995, Hunt was nominated by President Bill Clinton to a seat on the United States District Court for the Northern District of Georgia vacated by Horace Ward. Hunt was confirmed by the United States Senate on March 24, 1995, and received his commission the same day. Hunt assumed senior status on June 30, 2005. His courtroom is located in the Richard B. Russell Federal Building and United States Courthouse in downtown Atlanta.

=== Notable cases ===
Among Hunt's leading cases since his appointment to the federal bench was a major corruption trial in early 2001, in which the Atlanta Business Chronicle saw a connection to the scandals of the late Clinton administration. Hunt assumed senior status on June 30, 2005, but continues to hear cases in that capacity; and received some media coverage when he dismissed a lawsuit as "farcical" by prisoner Jonathan Lee Riches against NFL Quarterback Michael Vick.

Legal offices
Preceded by Horace Ward	Judge of the United States District Court for the Northern District of Georgia; 1995–2005	Succeeded by Timothy Batten
