= Robert Benham (judge) =

American judge

Chief Justice of the Supreme Court of Georgia
- In office 1995–2001
- Preceded by: Willis B. Hunt Jr.
- Succeeded by: Norman S. Fletcher

Associate Justice of the Supreme Court of Georgia
- In office 1989 – March 1, 2020
- Nominated by: Joe Frank Harris
- Succeeded by: Carla Wong McMillian

Judge of the Georgia Court of Appeals
- In office April 3, 1984 – 1989
- Nominated by: Joe Frank Harris

Personal details
- Born: September 25, 1946 (age 79) Cartersville, Georgia
- Education: Tuskegee University (B.S.); University of Georgia School of Law (J.D.); University of Virginia (LL.M.)

Robert Benham (born September 25, 1946) is a retired American lawyer and jurist who served on the Supreme Court of Georgia for over 30 years, retiring in March 2020. He was the second African-American graduate of the University of Georgia School of Law, the first African-American to serve on the Supreme Court of Georgia, and the first African-American to serve as the court's chief justice.

== Early life and education ==
Justice Benham is a lifelong resident of Georgia, and was born to Jesse Knox Benham and Clarence Benham in Cartersville, Georgia. He graduated from Summer Hill High School in Cartersville in 1963, and Tuskegee University with a Bachelor of Science in Political Science in 1967, attended Harvard University, graduated from the University of Georgia School of Law with a Juris Doctor in 1970, and received his Master of Laws from the University of Virginia in 1989. While attending the University of Georgia, he was a member of the Demosthenian Literary Society.

After completing law school, Benham served in the U.S. Army Reserve, attaining the rank of Captain. He then served briefly as a trial attorney for Atlanta Legal Aid Society, Inc., later returning to Cartersville, where he engaged in the private practice of law, served as Special Assistant Attorney General, and served two terms as President of the Bartow County Bar Association. Justice Benham became the first African American to establish a law practice in Bartow County.

== State judicial service ==
In 1984, Justice Benham was appointed by Governor Joe Frank Harris to the Georgia Court of Appeals, where he served for five years following his statewide election to the court, distinguishing himself as the first African American to win statewide election in Georgia since Reconstruction.

== Service on the Supreme Court of Georgia ==
In 1989, Justice Benham was further distinguished as the first African American to serve on the Supreme Court of Georgia, following his appointment by Governor Harris. He won the statewide election to a full term on the Supreme Court in 1990, and continued to serve on the court until his retirement on March 1, 2020. Justice Benham served as the court's Chief Justice from 1995 to 2001.

== Memberships ==
Justice Benham holds membership in numerous professional organizations, including eight national, state, and local bar associations, the American Judicature Society, the Lawyers' Club of Atlanta, the National Criminal Justice Association, the Georgia Bar Foundation, the Georgia Legal History Foundation (Trustee), and Scribes - The American Society of Writers on Legal Subjects. He is a former vice president of the Georgia Conference of Black Lawyers, a former board member of the Federal Lawyers Association and of the Georgia Association of Trial Lawyers. He is the former chairman of the Governor's Commission on Drug Awareness & Prevention, a member of the State Bar Task Force on the Involvement of Women & Minorities in the Profession, the Georgia Commission on Children & Youth, the National Association of Court Management, and a member of the National Conference of Chief Justices, a member of the Federal-State Jurisdiction Committee, President of the Society for Alternative Dispute Resolution, Chairman of the Judicial Council, Chairman of the Chief Justice's Commission on Professionalism, and a member of the Governor's Southern Business Institute.

Benham is a member of Alpha Phi Alpha fraternity.

Legal offices
Preceded by Thomas O. Marshall	Chief Justice of the Supreme Court of Georgia; 1995–2001	Succeeded by Norman S. Fletcher
