= Carl Sanders =

American lawyer and politician (1925–2014)

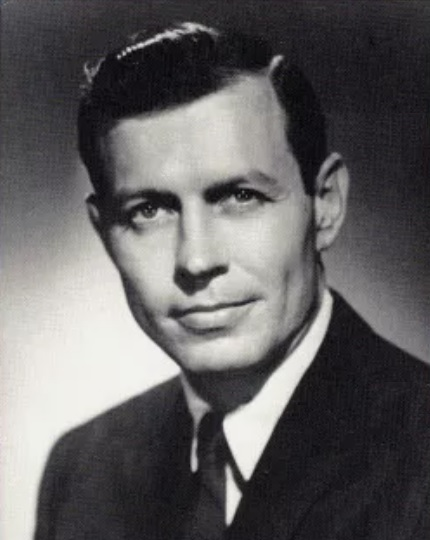
- Campaign portrait, 1962

74th Governor of Georgia
- In office January 14, 1963 – January 10, 1967
- Lieutenant: Peter Zack Geer
- Preceded by: Ernest Vandiver
- Succeeded by: Lester Maddox

President pro tempore of the Georgia State Senate
- In office February 20, 1959 – January 14, 1963
- Preceded by: Robert H. Jordan
- Succeeded by: Harry C. Jackson

Member of the Georgia State Senate from the 18th district
- In office January 14, 1957 – January 14, 1963
- Preceded by: M. Brinson Jones
- Succeeded by: J. B. Fuqua; Milford A. Scott

Member of the Georgia House of Representatives from Richmond County
- In office January 10, 1955 – January 14, 1957
- Succeeded by: Bernard F. Miles

Personal details
- Born: Carl Edward Sanders; May 15, 1925 Augusta, Georgia, U.S.
- Died: November 16, 2014 (aged 89) Atlanta, Georgia, U.S.
- Resting place: Westover Memorial Park, Augusta, Georgia, U.S.
- Party: Democratic
- Spouse: Betty Bird Foy (m. 1947)
- Education: University of Georgia (LLB)
- Occupation: Lawyer; politician

Military service
- Branch/service: United States Army; Army Air Forces
- Years of service: 1943–1945
- Battles/wars: World War II; American theater

Carl Edward Sanders Sr. (May 15, 1925 – November 16, 2014) was an American lawyer and politician who served as the 74th governor of Georgia from 1963 to 1967.

== Early life and education ==
Carl Sanders was born on May 15, 1925, in Augusta, Georgia, United States to a middle class family. He later stated that he had "an exceptionally happy and secure childhood." He attended the Academy of Richmond County, where he performed well academically and played on the school football team. He was made an alternate appointee to the United States Military Academy, but when the primary appointee claimed the spot Sanders accepted a football scholarship and enrolled at the University of Georgia in 1942. He played as a left-handed quarterback on the freshman football team.

While Sanders was at college, the United States entered World War II, and in 1943 he left his studies and joined the United States Army Air Forces. He was commissioned as a lieutenant and piloted B-17 Flying Fortress aircraft. He named his own bomber "Georgia Peach", but was never deployed overseas. After the war he returned to the University of Georgia to complete his studies. He studied law, passing the bar examination in early 1947 and finishing his courses in December. He played with the Georgia Bulldogs and went to the Oil Bowl. He was a member of the Chi Phi fraternity, the Phi Kappa Literary Society, Gridiron Secret Society, and the school debate team. On September 6, 1947, he married Betty Foy, an art student he had met at the university. They had two children together. Sanders started practicing law in Augusta with Henry Hammond before establishing his own practice with several other partners. He devoted a significant amount of time to practice early on to pay off medical debt after his wife fell ill.

== Legislative career ==
Sanders garnered an interest in politics from his father, who had served on the Richmond County Board of Commissioners. In 1954, Sanders won a seat in the Georgia House of Representatives, successfully defeating a "Cracker Party" candidate. Two years later he was elected to the Georgia State Senate. At the time, a rotation agreement meant the seat was typically held in successive fashion by a denizen of Richmond County, of Jefferson County, and of Glascock County. He was re-elected in 1958 and 1960, making him the only person to ever serve three consecutive terms from a multi-county Georgia senatorial constituency while the rotation agreements were in use.

In 1958 Sanders chaired a Senate committee which investigated potential corruption in the Rural Roads Authority during Governor Marvin Griffin's tenure. The committee found that the authority spent too much money on construction projects, located new roads without proper consideration, and was ineffective at maintaining existing roads. It recommended that the agency be dissolved and that future rural road projects be allocated based on population density, all financed with a pay-as-you-go system. Lieutenant Governor Ernest Vandiver became political allies with Sanders as a result of his committee work and made him Senate floor leader in 1959. Vandiver became governor, and that year a federal judge ordered the Atlanta Board of Education to draft a plan to racially desegregate schools. Vandiver called 60 people to the Governor's Mansion to discuss either proceeding with desegregation or closing the schools. Only Sanders and House floor leader Frank Twitty advised desegregation, the former fearing that suspending schools "would have created a generation of illiterates." Vandiver ultimately had schools closed only temporarily while the Georgia General Assembly revised state segregation statutes. He opposed a proposal to make the school issue subject to a statewide referendum. With the governor's support, Sanders was elected president pro tempore of the Senate on February 20, 1959, after Robert H. Jordan's resignation, and served in that position during the chamber's 1960 and 1962 regular sessions.

== Gubernatorial career ==
=== 1962 election ===
Sanders decided to make a bid for higher office in 1962. Initially mulling over a potential race for the office of lieutenant governor which had a retiring incumbent, he had doubts when a similarly-named Atlanta attorney, Carl F. Sanders, declared his candidacy. Carl E. Sanders suspected that the other man had been planted to confuse voters and spoil his chances by another candidate, Peter Zack Geer. Geer denied the allegation. Carl E. Sanders then decided to run for governor. At the time he launched his candidacy in late April, Georgia used the county unit system in its primaries, whereby the candidate who won the majority in most counties secured the party nomination, instead of the candidate which earned the majority of all votes across the state. This system greatly limited the chances of urban candidates for decades. Several weeks into the primary, federal courts declared this method unconstitutional, and left the nomination to be decided by popular vote. Sanders campaigned on "a platform of progress", pledging to improve education, reorganize the State Highway Department, revamp mental health and penal institutions, recruit industry, and reapportion the General Assembly.

Already seeking the nomination in the Democratic primary were former governor Marvin Griffin and incumbent Lieutenant Governor Garland T. Byrd. Byrd withdrew from the race after suffering a heart attack in May. Griffin was a staunch supporter of racial segregation. He attacked Sanders as too young for the governorship and not committed enough to defending segregation. Sanders supported segregation but felt it was useless to oppose federal integration orders. He promised to "maintain Georgia's traditional separation" but said he opposed race-baiting politics and that "I tip my hat to the past, but I take off my coat to the future." He also promised to keep public schools open, even if the federal government ordered them to integrate. Griffin held a rally with Alabama governor-elect George Wallace, another staunch segregationist, to demonstrate his support for racial separation. Sanders mocked this strategy at his own rally the same day, describing Griffin as "so weak in his belief in Georgia and her people that he plans to import an outsider to meddle in our affairs. I don't need an Alabama crutch to help me." Griffin pledged to oppose federal court orders to integrate and throughout the campaign vilified the "Negro bloc vote" in Georgia. Following a confrontation between the white supremacist Ku Klux Klan and the Georgia State Patrol at a Klan rally, Griffin offered that he was unsure of how to handle such a situation. Sanders accused the former governor of having prior knowledge of the rally and of bringing Klansmen into Georgia. Sanders also accused Griffin of having run a corrupt administration in his previous term. In the primary, he defeated Griffin, receiving 494,978 votes (58.7 percent) to Griffin's 332,746 (39 percent). Most of his support came from urban areas. He then won the general election. He took the oath of office on January 14 and was formally inaugurated as governor the following day. Aged 37 upon his assumption of the office, he was the youngest governor in the country at the time.

=== Executive actions ===
Sanders appointed a Governor's Commission for Efficiency and Improvement in Government, which managed reforms in the penal system, mental healthcare, the civil service, the Highway Department, the Department of Agriculture, and the Department of Education. He worked with Atlanta Mayor Ivan Allen Jr. to bring professional sports teams to the capital city, and in 1963 he recruited a friend, Rankin M. Smith Sr., to fund the creation of the Atlanta Falcons football team.

Sanders campaigned as a racial segregationist and did not actively support the civil rights movement for blacks when in office, but was forced to address racial issues on several occasions. He was regarded by observers as a racial moderate, and described his own position as "a segregationist but not a damned fool." He regarded both white reactionaries and black civil rights activists as politically extreme. Concerned that racial violence would interfere with his plans to expand Georgia's economy, he said, "while I am governor we are going to obey the laws, we are not going to resist federal court orders with violence, and we are not going to close any schools." He appointed some blacks to state boards and the first blacks to the State Patrol and Georgia National Guard. Overall, his administration was staffed predominantly by whites and he appointed no black agency heads or judges. When confrontations between different groups over racial issues appeared, he tended to try and negotiate compromises, though he sent state police to Savannah in July 1963 to head off violence and placed police on standby in Atlanta in mid-1966 when Mayor Allen confronted angry black demonstrators. He criticized rioters and testified to Congress against the passage of the Civil Rights Act of 1964, arguing it violated property rights.

=== Legislative affairs ===
By the time Sanders became governor, it was common for this official to wield wide influence over the General Assembly, including being able to essentially name the Speaker of the House and legislative committee chairmen. He was one of the last governors to be able to exercise this amount of authority over the legislature. In 1963 Leroy Johnson became the first black state senator in Georgia in decades. When guards at the State Capitol informed Sanders that Johnson and his black pages were ignoring signs designating "white" and "colored" restrooms and water fountains, the governor had the signage removed. Later, Johnson attempted to dine at the Commerce Club, an Atlanta venue frequented by legislators and other members of the state's political and economic elite. The white maître d' refused Johnson service, so he contacted Sanders. Sanders called club founder Robert W. Woodruff, who subsequently instructed the maître d' to serve Johnson.

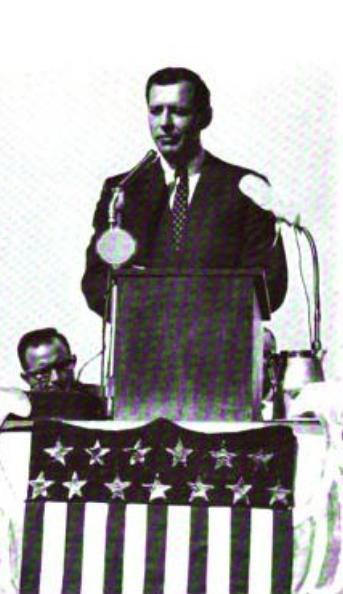
Sanders speaking at an airport dedication, 1966

Sanders was a fiscal conservative. Most of his budgeting focus was directed at public education. His administration's 1963 budget recommendation to the General Assembly devoted 56 percent of expenditures to education. At the governor's request, the legislature created the Governor's Commission to Improve Education, with 25 members appointed by the governor. The body included the first black people appointed to a state commission since the Reconstruction era. Equipped with the commission's recommendations, the following year he stated that Georgia's education system was a "modern crisis" and called for a $30 million increase in taxes to improve schools. This included a 50 cent increase on the tax per gallon on liquor, a 12 cent increase on the tax per case of beer, 1% increase in the corporate income tax, and the elimination of the vendors' commission on collection of the general sales tax. He further requested that the State Board of Education be empowered to establish minimum standards and that $100 million in bonds be issued to fund new educational institution construction. The General Assembly incorporated his suggestions with minimal alterations. Over the course of his tenure, schoolteacher and university faculty salaries were raised, 10,000 additional teachers were hired, a record number of new schools were built, new junior colleges and vocational schools were created, and a Governor's Honors Program was established.

Sanders asked the legislature to appropriate funds for airport construction to attract industry to outlying communities. As a result, 33 new community airports were established in Georgia between 1965 and 1966. Georgia's economy performed well during his tenure, and the state had a budget surplus when he left office.

While serving as governor, Sanders supported an attempt by the General Assembly to draft a new state constitution in 1963. The proposed document was prevented from being scheduled for a referendum necessary to ratify it by a United States district court, which ruled that since the legislators who had created the constitution were from malapportioned districts, their work was invalid. Sanders was deeply disappointed by the ruling. The decision was later reversed by the United States Supreme Court, but by then there was not sufficient political will to revamp the constitution. On February 17, 1964, the Supreme Court ruled in Wesberry v. Sanders that Georgia had to redraw its congressional districts to comply with the principle of one man, one vote. The General Assembly had only four days to respond before its session was scheduled for adjournment, but Sanders urged it to redraw the districts. The legislators struggled with the process, and after his own floor leader had resigned the revisions to failure, Sanders visited the House floor on February 21 to encourage the body to keep working. Despite the vocal dissatisfaction of some legislators, a revised districting plan was ultimately passed.

=== Political affairs ===
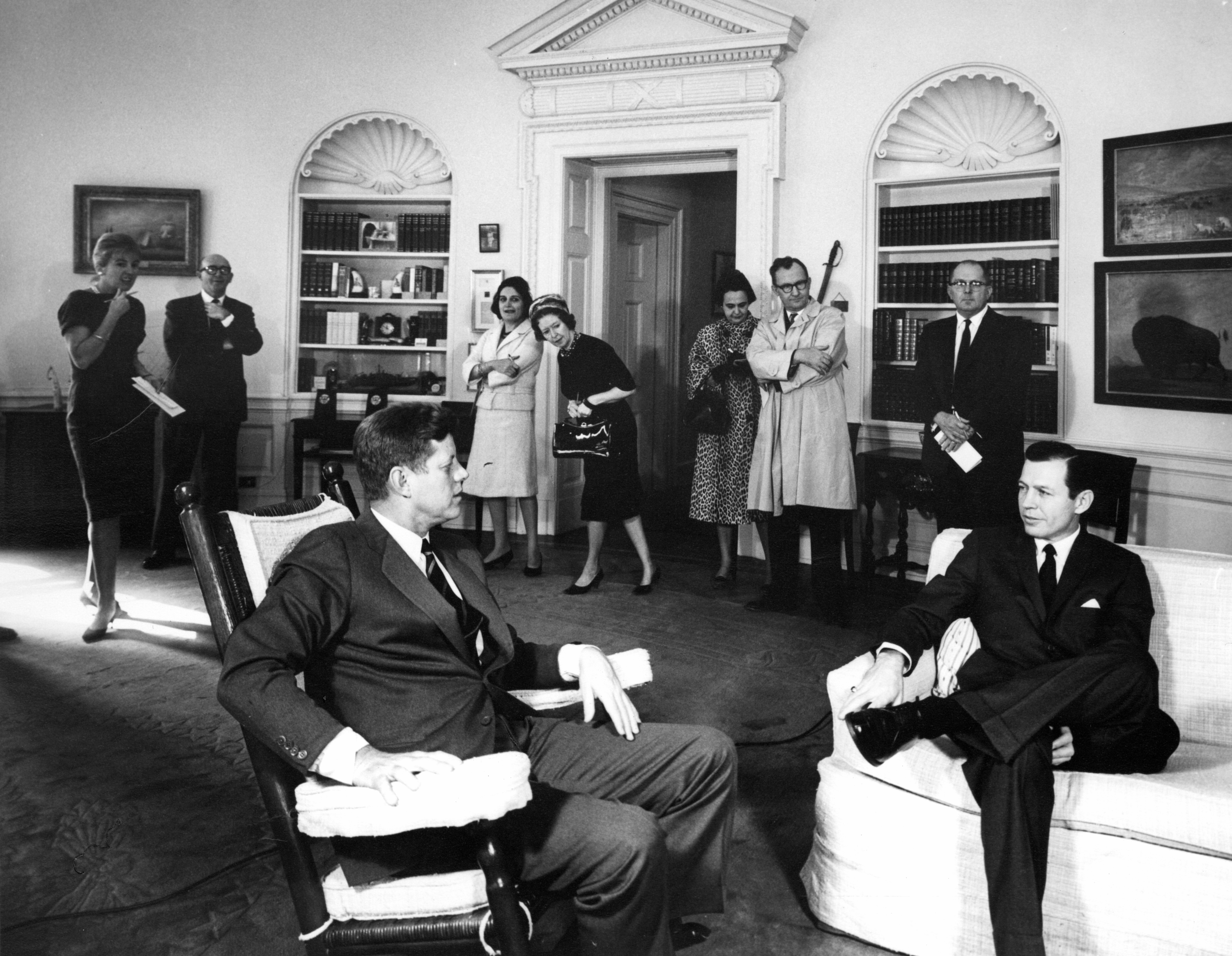
Sanders with President John F. Kennedy in 1962

Shortly after winning election, Sanders visited President of the United States John F. Kennedy. He was generally supportive of the president's administration and used his New Frontier rhetoric.

In 1964 Sanders appointed a biracial delegation to represent Georgia at the 1964 Democratic National Convention, the first time that black people were represented on the delegation. Sanders explained, "[T]his is not a social club. This is purely a political organization, based on the fact that every voter should be represented."

Under the term limit law then in effect, Sanders was ineligible to run for re-election in 1966. In the general election campaign that year, he endorsed Democratic nominee Lester Maddox, a segregationist, as his successor though the two had disagreed on many issues. At the Democratic State Convention in Macon on October 15, 1966, Sanders told the delegates: "A man should be loyal to his country, his family, to his God and to his political party—and don't you ever forget it." In his speech, Sanders likened Maddox's Republican opponent, U.S. Representative Howard Callaway, to the "arrogance of Richard Nixon, the chameleon ability of Ronald Reagan to switch rather than fight, and the callous concern for human needs that is a throwback to McKinley, Harding, and Coolidge." Callaway criticized Sanders for mishandling the state budget surplus, a position which weakened the Republican among anti-Maddox moderate voters. Callaway led Maddox in the popular vote but failed to win a majority, and the Democratic-controlled Georgia General Assembly chose Maddox as governor. Sanders was succeeded by Maddox on January 10, 1967.

== 1970 gubernatorial campaign ==
Sanders left office at the peak of his popularity and turned down several offers for federal government positions from President Johnson. Instead he returned to mount an unsuccessful campaign for governor in 1970. The other two candidates in the Democratic primary were former state senator Jimmy Carter and black attorney Chevene Bowers King. Sanders was initially favored by most political observers as the candidate most likely to win. Early polls conducted at the behest of Carter showed most Georgians held a favorable view of Sanders' previous gubernatorial term. Carter directed his campaign team to frame his opponent as anti-democratic, "nouveau riche", "Atlanta-oriented", overly liberal, and hostile to George Wallace.

Carter attempted to portray himself as friendly to the "average man" and working-class voters, while portraying Sanders as out-of-touch and regularly referring to him as "Cuff Links Carl". He also regularly claimed without basis that Sanders had used his time in office to enrich himself. Sanders ran with the slogan "Carl Sanders ought to be governor again," which appeared to some voters as arrogant. Furthermore, while his television advertisements showed him as a man of success while jogging, boating, and flying, Carter's ads focused on his farming background and suggested that Sanders was the candidate of the "big-money boys".

Carter's campaign anonymously distributed a photo of Sanders getting doused with a bottle of champagne by a black Atlanta Hawks basketball player celebrating a victory at a game. The photo communicated several potentially damaging messages about Sanders, including his wealth, an association with alcohol (which was disliked in teetotalist rural communities) and a personal connection with a black person. The Carter campaign also published anonymous "fact-sheets" which described Sanders as a staunch ally of controversial black legislator Julian Bond (the two actually disliked one another), noted his attendance at the funeral of civil rights activist Martin Luther King Jr., and attacked him for denying Wallace an official visit to the state. At the same time, the campaign set up a fictitious "Black Concern Committee" to draw black support away from Sanders by arguing that he had failed to honor promises to the black community during his gubernatorial tenure. Carter's campaign press secretary later described their efforts as a "nigger campaign".

In the September 9 Democratic primary, Carter led with 388,280 votes, while Sanders placed second with 301,179 votes, most of them from blacks or urbanites. With the contest moving to a runoff since no candidate had won an outright majority, Sanders began a series of attacks on Carter. At a press conference shortly after the first primary, he called Carter "a smiling hypocrite" and a staunch liberal. When Carter refused to debate him, Sanders hosted a televised debate with an empty chair, though the absent opponent brushed the event aside, quipping "Some folks said the chair was ahead." After Carter secured the endorsement of segregationist publisher Roy V. Harris, Sanders' campaign crafted a pamphlet which depicted Carter climbing into a bed with Harris. Sanders' workers also created another pamphlet showing a picture of dilapidated tenant housing on Carter's farm, captioned "Isn't it time someone spoke up for these people?" Carter denounced the literature as smear sheets and warned his campaign workers about their distribution. During the last few days of the campaign, Sanders' organization launched an intense effort to fly the pamphlets into far-flung areas of the state. Many were intercepted by Carter supporters posing as Sanders campaigners and destroyed.

In the runoff primary Carter won with 60 percent of the vote. Sanders received 93 percent of the black vote and the support of his erstwhile backers, but Carter won overwhelmingly in rural areas. He felt guilty about the tactics he had employed, and after his win he called Sanders to apologize for attacking his character. Carter was victorious in the subsequent general election, and was later elected President of the United States in 1976. Sanders remained bitter about the 1970 campaign, and later said of Carter, "He is not proud of that election, and he shouldn't be proud of it," though he also thought Carter made "more of a class distinction than a race distinction" in the campaign. He never pursued public office after his loss but remained an active fundraiser for Democratic candidates. He served as the finance chairman of the Georgia Democratic Party during George Busbee's gubernatorial tenure.

== Later life and death ==
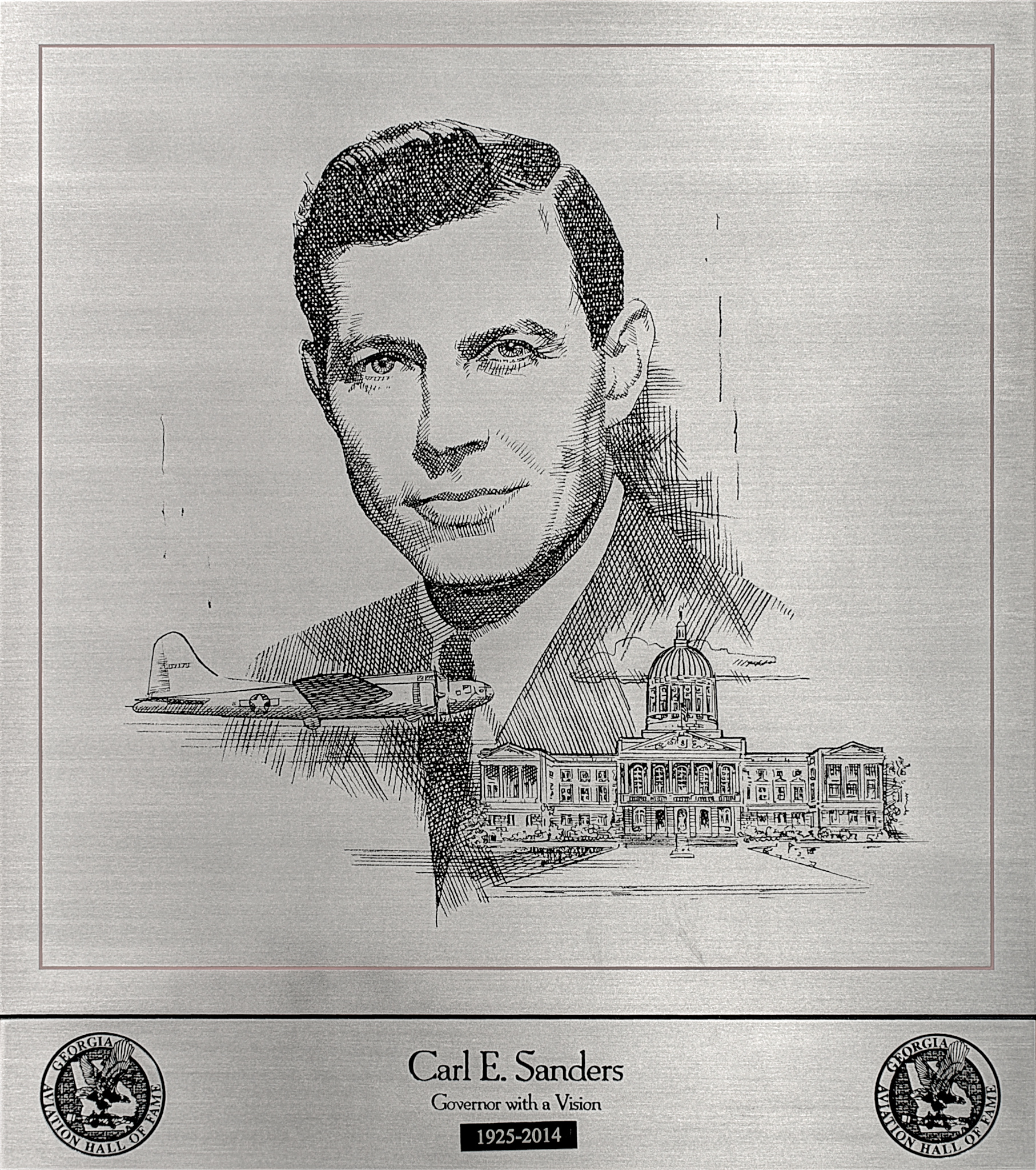
Plaque of Sanders at the Georgia Aviation Hall of Fame

Sanders and real estate developer Thomas G. Cousins purchased the St. Louis Hawks and transferred the franchise to Atlanta on 2 May 1968.

In 1967 Sanders joined with several other lawyers to create the firm Troutman, Sanders, Lockerman & Ashmore in Atlanta. He renewed his focus on the firm—which was renamed Troutman Sanders in 1992—after his loss in the 1970 gubernatorial race and recruited Georgia Power and Southern Company as clients. He became chairman of First Georgia Bank in 1973. He served as chairman of the law firm for thirty years, and in 2006 became its chairman emeritus. At the time of his death, Troutman Sanders had grown to include 600 lawyers. Sanders died in Atlanta on November 16, 2014, at the age of 89, after a fall at his home.

In recognition of his role in encouraging the construction and expansion of airports in Georgia, he was inducted into the Georgia Aviation Hall of Fame in 1997. The Carl E. Sanders Family YMCA opened in Buckhead, Atlanta, in 2000, after a gift to construct it was made in Sanders’ honor by Guy Millner.

== Works cited ==
- Buchanan, Scott E. (2011). Some of the People Who Ate My Barbecue Didn't Vote for Me: The Life of Georgia Governor Marvin Griffin. Vanderbilt University Press. ISBN 9780826517616.
- Cook, James F. (1988). "Carl Sanders and the Politics of the Future". In Henderson, Harold P.; Roberts, Gary L. (eds.). Georgia Governors in an Age of Change: From Ellis Arnall to George Busbee. University of Georgia Press. ISBN 9780820310053.
- Hathorn, Billy Burton (1987). "The Frustration of Opportunity: Georgia Republicans and the Election of 1966". Atlanta History: A Journal of Georgia and the South. XXXI (4) (winter ed.): 37–52.
- Henderson, Harold Paulk (2008). Ernest Vandiver, Governor of Georgia. University of Georgia Press. ISBN 9780820330600.
- Lauth, Thomas P. (2021). Public Budgeting in Georgia: Institutions, Process, Politics and Policy. Springer. ISBN 9783030760236.
- Sanders, Randy (1992). ""The Sad Duty of Politics": Jimmy Carter and the Issue of Race in His 1970 Gubernatorial Campaign". The Georgia Historical Quarterly. 76 (3): 612–638. JSTOR 40582593.
- Sanders, Randy (2002). Mighty Peculiar Elections: The New South Gubernatorial Campaigns of 1970 and the Changing Politics of Race. Gainesville: University Press of Florida. ISBN 0-8130-2565-6.

Party political offices
Preceded by Ernest Vandiver	Democratic nominee for Governor of Georgia; 1962, 1966	Succeeded by Lester Maddox
Political offices
Preceded by Ernest Vandiver	Governor of Georgia; 1963–1967	Succeeded by Lester Maddox
