= Supreme Court of Georgia (U.S. state) =

Highest court in the U.S. state of Georgia

Coordinates: 33.748496°N 84.38913°W

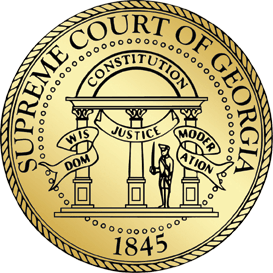
- Seal of the Supreme Court of Georgia
- Interactive map of Supreme Court of Georgia
- Established: 1845
- Location: Atlanta, Georgia
- Composition method: Non-partisan statewide election
- Authorised by: Georgia Constitution
- Appeals to: Supreme Court of the United States (for matters involving federal law or the U.S. Constitution only)
- Number of positions: 9, by statute
- Website: gasupreme.us

Chief Justice
- Currently: Nels S.D. Peterson
- Since: April 1, 2025
- Lead position ends: March 31, 2029

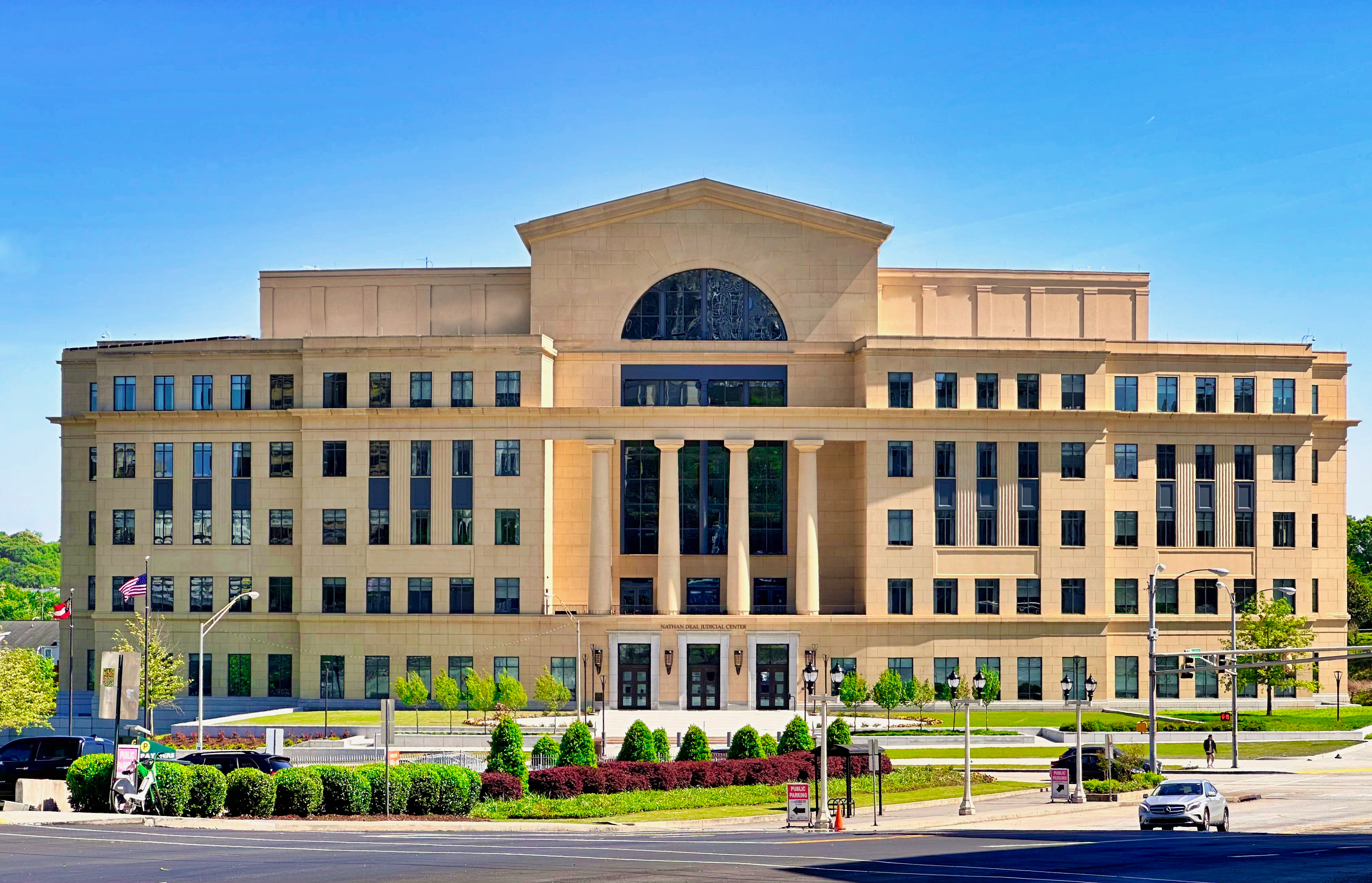
The Supreme Court of Georgia is located at the Nathan Deal Judicial Center in Atlanta

The Supreme Court of Georgia is the highest judicial authority of the U.S. state of Georgia. The court was established in 1845 as a three-member panel, increased in number to six, then to seven in 1945, and finally to nine in 2017. Since 1896, the justices have been elected by the people of the state. The justices are currently elected in statewide non-partisan elections for six-year terms, with any vacancies filled through an appointment by the Governor.

The first Chief Justice of the Court was Joseph Henry Lumpkin, who was appointed to that position in 1863. Under the current Constitution of Georgia, the Chief Justice is designated as "the chief presiding and administrative officer of the court," and is elected by the justices. The justices also elect a Presiding Justice to serve if the Chief Justice is absent or is disqualified. As of 2025, the chief justice of the court is Nels S.D. Peterson, and the Presiding Justice is Sarah Hawkins Warren. Both justices were sworn into their respective positions on April 1, 2025.

== History ==
Georgia was established as a state under the Federal Constitution in 1788. In the state's early days the justice system was set up so that matters of law were settled at a local level with no appellate courts. In 1799, the Judiciary Act stated that the judges of Georgia would meet annually and discuss any laws or rules that may have or would cause argument among the state. This allowed much of the laws and rules to be somewhat uniform across the state. This did not last long, however, as the General Assembly (state legislature) repealed that procedure in 1801, referring any arguments then-outstanding back to each county for decision by the local presiding judge.

From then, the judges of the superior courts (the general trial courts) began conferring informally on difficult points of law. When a group of superior court judges declared an act of the legislature unconstitutional, however, the legislature in 1815 disapproved even of this practice.

At that point, with no way of ensuring superior court decisions would be uniform throughout the state, several successive governors from the 1820s to 1840s urged the creation of a supreme court. In 1828, Governor John Forsyth complained that the then-eight superior court judges were not bound by precedent from either their predecessors nor from a higher court. As a result, there was neither "uniformity nor certainty in the laws for the security of the rights of persons or property. The confusion produced by contemporary contradictory decisions, everyday increases – property is held and recovered in one part, and lost in another part of the state under like circumstances – rights are asserted and maintained in one circuit, and denied in another, in analogous cases."

The state Constitution was finally amended in 1835 to authorize the establishment of a supreme court, but the court itself was not established by legislative act until 1845. The original court consisted of three justices: Joseph Henry Lumpkin as the presiding justice, Hiram Warner, and Eugenius A. Nisbet. Their salaries were $2,500 a year. The court held its first session in Talbotton, Georgia, on January 26, 1846, and held sessions by "riding circuit," that is, holding court at several locations throughout the superior court circuits of the state, traveling at their own expense.

Subsequent state constitutions and amendments have modified the composition and practice of the court. The 1865 Constitution, following the American Civil War, ended the practice of circuit-riding by providing that the court would sit in the state capital (today, Atlanta). An 1896 constitutional amendment expanded the court by three justices and provided for popular election of the justices. A seventh justice was added by an amendment in 1945. The current state constitution authorizes up to nine justices, and the eighth and ninth seats were created by the Appellate Jurisdiction Reform Act in 2016.

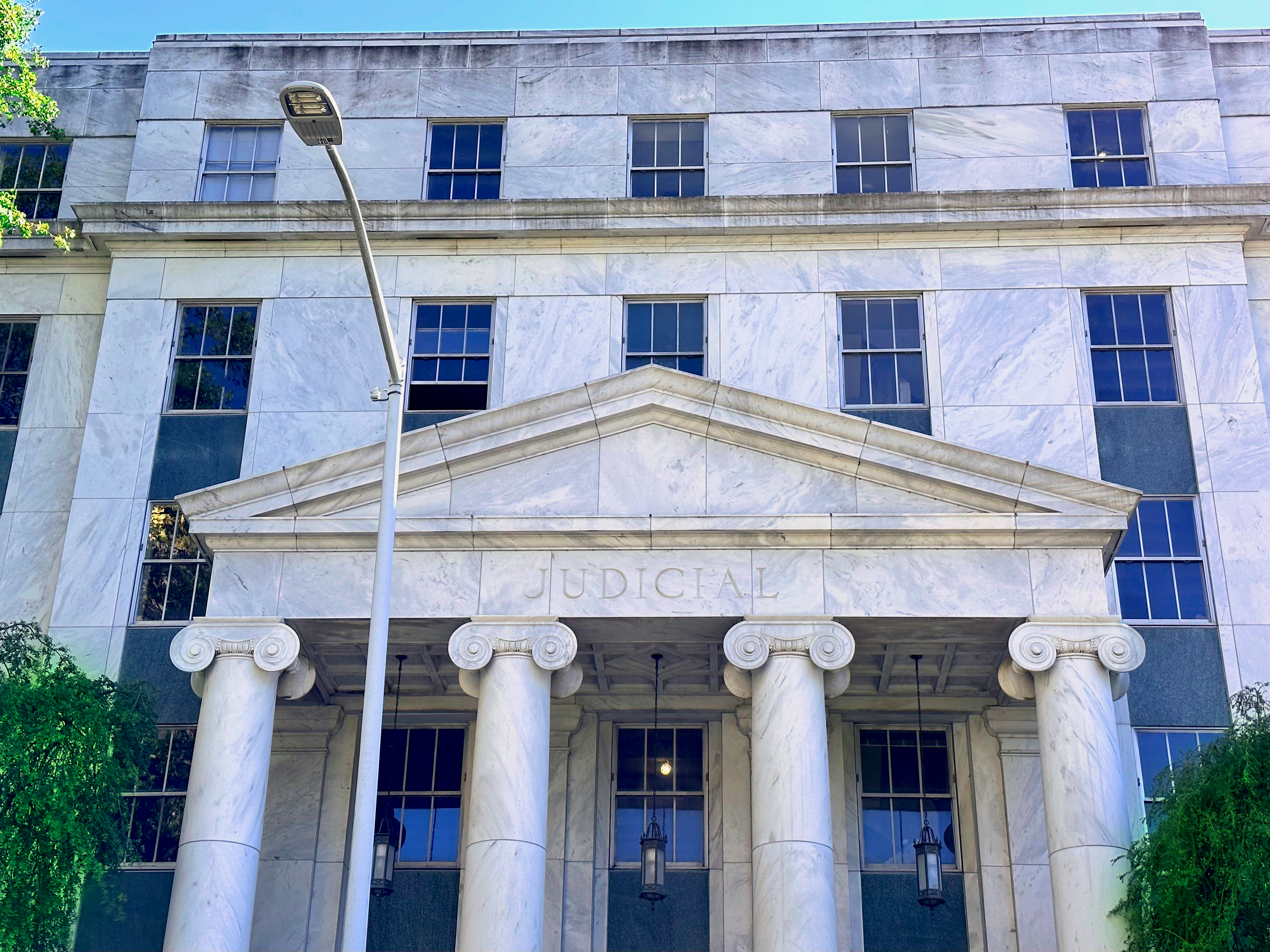
The building that housed the Supreme Court of Georgia from 1954 until 2019.

The supreme court was originally housed in room 341 on the third floor of the Georgia State Capitol. In 1954 it moved to room 606 on the sixth floor of the Judicial Building across the street. On Dec. 6, 2019, the supreme court moved into the Nathan Deal Judicial Center at 330 Capitol Ave. S.E. The seven-story, 215,000-square-foot judicial center is the most expensive state-funded building in Georgia history, costing $130 million to build in 2019. It is named after former governor Nathan Deal.

== Justices ==
=== Current justices ===
Name	Born	Start	Chief term	Term ends (Note: Term ends Dec. 31 of the year listed.)	Appointer	Law school
Nels S. D. Peterson, Chief Justice	September 17, 1978 (age 48)	January 1, 2017	2025–present	2030	Nathan Deal (R)	Harvard
Sarah Hawkins Warren, Presiding Justice	1981 or 1982 (age 44–45)	September 17, 2018	–	2032	Nathan Deal (R)	Duke
Charlie Bethel	March 3, 1976 (age 50)	October 2, 2018	–	2032	Nathan Deal (R)	Georgia
John J. Ellington	October 26, 1960 (age 66)	December 19, 2018	–	2030	—N/a (Note: Took office after winning a nonpartisan election.)	Georgia
Carla Wong McMillian	May 27, 1973 (age 53)	April 10, 2020	–	2028	Brian Kemp (R)	Georgia
Shawn Ellen LaGrua	1962 (age 63–64)	January 7, 2021	–	2028	Brian Kemp (R)	Georgia State
Verda Colvin	1965 (age 60–61)	July 29, 2021	–	2028	Brian Kemp (R)	Georgia
Andrew Pinson	1986 (age 39–40)	July 20, 2022	–	2030	Brian Kemp (R)	Georgia
Benjamin Land	1967 or 1968 (age 58–59)	July 24, 2025	–	2032	Brian Kemp (R)	Georgia

=== Chief justices ===
Name	Year appointed	End term
Joseph Henry Lumpkin	1863	1867
Hiram B. Warner	1867, 1872	1868,1880
Joseph E. Brown	1868	1870
Osborne Augustus Lochrane	1871	1872
James Jackson	1880	1887
Logan Edwin Bleckley	1887	1894
Thomas J. Simmons	1894	1905
W. H. Fish	1905	1923
Richard Russell Sr.	1923	1938
Charles S. Reid	1938	1943
R. C. Bell	1943	1946
William Franklin Jenkins	1946	1948
William Henry Duckworth	1948	1969
Bond Almand	1969	1972
Carlton Mobley	1972	1974
Benning M. Grice	1974	1975
Horace Elmo Nichols	1975	1980
Hiram K. Undercofler	1980	1980
Robert H. Jordan	1980	1982
Harold N. Hill, Jr.	1982	1986
Thomas O. Marshall	1986	1989
Charles L. Weltner	1990	1992
Harold G. Clarke	1990	1994
Willis B. Hunt, Jr.	1994	1995
Robert Benham	1995	2001
Norman S. Fletcher	2001	2005
Leah Ward Sears	2005	2009
Carol W. Hunstein	2009	2012
George H. Carley	2012	2012
Carol W. Hunstein	2012	2013
Hugh P. Thompson	2013	2016
P. Harris Hines	2017	2018
Harold Melton	2018	2021
David Nahmias	2021	2022
Michael P. Boggs	2022	2025
Nels S.D. Peterson	2025	Present

== Jurisdiction ==
The Supreme Court of Georgia has the right and authority over every case that involves the review of select appellate jurisdiction. The cases in which it can perform rule over are the cases that bring in question of constitutionality of a law, constitutional arrangement, or mandate. Any election contest can be judged by the Supreme Court of Georgia and the cases it has appellate jurisdiction in are the following:

- Cases including wills;
- Cases of divorce and alimony;
- Equity cases;
- Habeas Corpus cases;
- Cases certified to it by the Court of Appeals;
- Title to land cases;
- Cases in which a death sentence could be charged or was charged; and
- Extraordinary remedies cases.

Each justice can create an opinion, but it must be passed to the other justices, and after a discussion, depending on the majority, that opinion can be taken in or nulled. In the instance that any justice cannot serve in a case due to disqualification or any other reason, a judge to substitute has is sent by the Court to take that place.

== Courtroom security ==
Courtroom security is provided by the Capitol Police Division of the Georgia Department of Public Safety.

== Bar admissions ==
The Supreme Court of Georgia is unusual among state high courts in that, while it sets forth and implements the rules for admitting new lawyers to the state bar, it does not formally conduct the admissions itself. Instead, new lawyers are admitted to practice by taking an oath before a judge of one of the superior courts (that is, a local trial-level court).

The Office of Bar Admissions is an administrative arm of the Supreme Court that is responsible for implementing the rules for admission. That Office assists two separate boards appointed by the Supreme Court. The Board to Determine Fitness of Bar Applicants handles "character and fitness" issues, inquiring into a candidate's "honesty, trustworthiness, diligence, [and] reliability" to determine fitness to practice law. The Board of Bar Examiners administers and grades the state's bar examination each February and July. Subject to educational and other criteria, the boards will certify for admission candidates who meet the character and fitness requirements and pass both the bar examination and the Multistate Professional Responsibility Examination. Candidates may then obtain admission to the Bar by appearing in superior court, and then separately seek admission to the Court of Appeals and the Supreme Court.

== See also ==
- Fiat justitia ruat caelum ("let justice be done though the heavens fall"), the phrase engraved on the wall behind the bench in the Supreme Court of Georgia
- State Bar of Georgia
- Courts of Georgia
- Judiciary of Georgia
  - Georgia Court of Appeals
  - Georgia Superior Courts

== Citations ==
- History of the Supreme Court of Georgia (accessed February 17, 2014)

Huebner, Timothy. The Southern Judicial Tradition: State Judges and Sectional Distinctiveness, 1790–1890. Athens, Ga.: University of Georgia Press, 1999.

- Supreme Court of Georgia Rules

Georgia, S. O. (2016). Rules. Retrieved April 20, 2017, from http://www.gasupreme.us/rules/
