= 2026 Georgia Supreme Court election =

- May 19, 2026

The 2026 Georgia Supreme Court election was held on May 19, 2026, to elect three justices to the Supreme Court of Georgia. The elections are officially nonpartisan, though candidates may receive the support of political parties.

Since 1896, justices on the Supreme Court and judges on the Court of Appeals have been directly elected in statewide elections. Judicial elections were made non-partisan in 1983. Elections for nonpartisan state judgeships have been held on the date of the legislative primary since 2012, and were previously held on the general election ballot in November during even-numbered years.

Two of the three seats up for election are being contested by multiple candidates.

== Campaign ==
Incumbent conservative justices Charlie Bethel and Sarah Warren, both appointed by former Republican governor Nathan Deal, are being challenged by liberal candidates Miracle Rankin and Jen Jordan respectively. The election being held in the immediate aftermath of the Louisiana v. Callais decision, both liberal candidates have made voting rights central themes of their campaigns, with abortion rights, particularly their opposition to Georgia's six week abortion ban, also receiving attention. Incumbent justice Benjamin Land, appointed by Republican governor Brian Kemp, is running for his seat unopposed. No incumbent justice on the Georgia Supreme Court has lost re-election in over 100 years.

== Bethel seat ==
=== Candidates ===
==== Declared ====
- Charlie Bethel, incumbent justice
- Miracle Rankin, personal injury attorney

=== Endorsements ===
Charlie Bethel

Federal officials

- BJay Pak, former United States Attorney for the Northern District of Georgia (2017–2021) (Republican)

Statewide officials

- Nathan Deal, former governor of Georgia (2011–2019) (Republican)
- Brian Kemp, governor of Georgia (2019–present) (Republican)
- Harold Melton, former supreme court chief justice (2018–2021) and associate justice (2005–2021) (Republican)

State senators

- Jason Carter, former state senator from the 42nd district (2010–2015) (Democratic)

Individuals

- Ashleigh Merchant, criminal defense attorney

Organizations

- NFIB Georgia PAC
Miracle Rankin

Federal officials

- Kamala Harris, former Vice President of the United States (2021–2025) (Democratic)
- Eric Holder, former United States Attorney General (2009–2015) (Democratic)
- Barack Obama, former President of the United States (2009–2017) (Democratic)

U.S. Senators

- Jon Ossoff, Georgia (2021–present) (Democratic)

Individuals

- Charlie Bailey, chair of the Democratic Party of Georgia (2025–present)

Organizations

- EMILYs List
- End Citizens United
- Fair Fight Action
- Georgia AFL-CIO
- Georgia Conservation Voters
- Georgia Equality
- Georgia Federation of Democratic Women
- Georgia National Organization for Women
- Indivisible Cobb, North Metro Atlanta, Savannah, and Sweetwater
- March On PAC
- National Democratic Redistricting Committee
- Planned Parenthood Votes
- Reproductive Freedom for All
- Service Employees International Union
- UFCW Local 1996

Political parties

- Democratic Party of Georgia
- Clayton County Democrats
- Emanuel County Democratic Committee
- Floyd County Democrats
- Fulton County Democrats
- Hall County Democratic Party
- Muscogee County Democratic Committee
- Pickens County Democratic Committee

=== Results ===
Results by county: Bethel: 50–60%; 60–70%; 70–80%; 80–90%; Rankin: 50–60%; 60–70%; 70–80%

Charlie Bethel's seat
Candidate	Votes	%
Charlie Bethel (incumbent)	990,743	51.11
Miracle Rankin	947,697	48.89
Total votes	1,938,440	100.00

== Warren seat ==
=== Candidates ===
==== Declared ====
- Jen Jordan, former state senator from the 6th district (2017–2023) and Democratic nominee for attorney general in 2022
- Sarah Warren, incumbent justice

=== Endorsements ===
Jen Jordan

Federal officials

- Kamala Harris, former Vice President of the United States (2021–2025) (Democratic)
- Eric Holder, former United States Attorney General (2009–2015) (Democratic)
- Barack Obama, former President of the United States (2009–2017) (Democratic)

U.S. Senators

- Jon Ossoff, Georgia (2021–present) (Democratic)

Individuals

- Charlie Bailey, chair of the Democratic Party of Georgia (2025–present)

Organizations

- EMILYs List
- End Citizens United
- Fair Fight Action
- Georgia AFL-CIO
- Georgia Conservation Voters
- Georgia Equality
- Georgia Federation of Democratic Women
- Georgia National Organization for Women
- Indivisible Cobb, North Metro Atlanta, Savannah, and Sweetwater
- March On PAC
- National Democratic Redistricting Committee
- Planned Parenthood Votes
- Reproductive Freedom for All
- Service Employees International Union
- UFCW Local 1996

Political parties

- Democratic Party of Georgia
- Clayton County Democrats
- Emanuel County Democratic Committee
- Floyd County Democrats
- Fulton County Democrats
- Hall County Democratic Party
- Muscogee County Democratic Committee
- Pickens County Democratic Committee
Sarah Warren

Statewide officials

- Brian Kemp, governor of Georgia (2019–present) (Republican)

Organizations

- NFIB Georgia PAC

=== Results ===
Results by county: Warren: 50–60%; 60–70%; 70–80%; 80–90%; Jordan: 50–60%; 60–70%

Sarah Warren's seat
Candidate	Votes	%
Sarah Warren (incumbent)	1,140,325	59.33
Jen Jordan	781,748	40.67
Total votes	1,922,073	100.00

== Land seat ==
=== Candidates ===
==== Declared ====
- Ben Land, incumbent justice

=== Results ===
Ben Land's seat
Candidate	Votes	%
Ben Land (incumbent)	1,717,722	100.00
Total votes	1,717,722	100.00
