= Jen Jordan =

American lawyer and politician (born 1974)

Member of the Georgia State Senate from the 6th district
- In office December 15, 2017 – January 9, 2023
- Preceded by: Hunter Hill
- Succeeded by: Jason Esteves

Personal details
- Born: Jennifer Lyn Auer; October 17, 1974 (age 51) Jacksonville, North Carolina, U.S.
- Party: Democratic
- Spouse: Lawton Jordan (m. 2004)
- Children: 2
- Education: Georgia Southern University (BS); University of Georgia (JD)

Jennifer Lyn Auer Jordan (born October 17, 1974) is an American lawyer and politician who represented District 6 in the Georgia State Senate from 2017 to 2023. She is a member of the Democratic Party. She was the party's nominee for Attorney General of Georgia in the 2022 election, losing to Republican incumbent Chris Carr. In 2026, Jordan was a candidate for the Supreme Court of Georgia, losing to incumbent Justice Sarah Hawkins Warren.

== Early life and education ==
Jennifer Lyn Auer was born on October 17, 1974, at Marine Corps Base Camp Lejeune North Carolina to Winona Giddens Purser and Michael James Auer. Michael had been stationed at Camp Lejeune since high school. When she was in kindergarten, her parents divorced. After the divorce, Winona moved to Eastman, Georgia, with her two children, Jen and Jessica. Winona was employed as a hairdresser, and the family lived in a small apartment.

Jordan was educated in the Dodge County School District. She received her bachelor's degree from Georgia Southern University and a Juris Doctor, magna cum laude, from the University of Georgia School of Law. During her time at law school, Jordan was a member of the Georgia Law Review and of the school's award-winning moot court team. She is a master with the Joseph Henry Lumpkin Inn of Court.

== Career ==
=== Legal career ===
After graduating from law school, Jordan worked as a federal clerk for judge Anthony Alaimo of the United States District Court for the Southern District of Georgia.

From 2002 to 2004, Jordan was an attorney with Bondurant, Mixson & Elmore LLP in Atlanta. From 2004 to 2008, she was a trial attorney with the Barnes Law Group. Jordan was part of the team to litigate Perdue v. Lake, a constitutional challenge to the 2006 Photo ID Act.

From 2010 to 2014, Jordan served as Of Counsel for the Bird Law Group Professional Corporation. From 2013 to 2015, she ran her own law firm, The Jordan Firm. Since 2015, she has been a partner with Shamp, Jordan, & Woodward in Atlanta. In 2018, Jordan won the Golden Rule Insurance Company case, against an insurance agency that had claimed that breast cancer was a pre-existing condition and refused to cover treatments for an insured patient.

=== Georgia state senate ===
==== 2017 campaign ====
In 2017, Jordan beat 7 competitors to compete in a runoff election against Democrat Jaha Howard for the Georgia State Senate's 6th district after Hunter Hill resigned in order to run for governor. Jordan promised she would raise the minimum wage in Georgia to $10.10 per hour and give local municipalities the power to set their own wage standards.

On December 5, 2017, she defeated Howard. Her victory in this election ended what had been a Republican supermajority in the State Senate. Jordan defeated Howard by having 10,681 votes (64%), while Howard had only 6,017 votes (36%).

==== Voting rights ====
In early 2021, Jordan was outspoken in her opposition to SB 202, claiming that the bill amounted to a "hostile takeover of local elections boards." When companies began to boycott Georgia after the bill was passed, Jordan said that she would rather have "people and companies in this state use their economic power for change than not come here at all."

==== Environmental justice and Sterigenics ====
Jordan's district, which includes a broad swath of the Northern Atlanta suburbs, includes a medical sterilization plant called Sterigenics. In 2019, testing revealed that neighborhoods around the plant were experiencing spikes in the amount of ethylene oxide, a chemical which can cause cancer, in the air. Jordan sent information about the situation to Gov. Brian Kemp and Attorney General Chris Carr, asking for their help in resolving the situation in August 2019. In September 2019, she sued the Georgia Environmental Protection Division in response to a consent order which permitted the plant to continue operating with some limitations despite releasing toxins, arguing that the company had unlawfully entered into an agreement which endangered her neighbors and constituents with the EPD.

A temporary restraining order issued on April 1, 2020, allowed the plant to resume full operations despite the pending lawsuit due to increased need for medical sterilization during the COVID-19 epidemic. On April 8, 2020, a federal judge issued a consent order allowing the plant to continue indefinitely under the terms of the restraining order. Jordan cited the Sterigenics lawsuit, and Chris Carr's refusal to become involved, as reasons she decided to run for Attorney General in the 2022 elections.

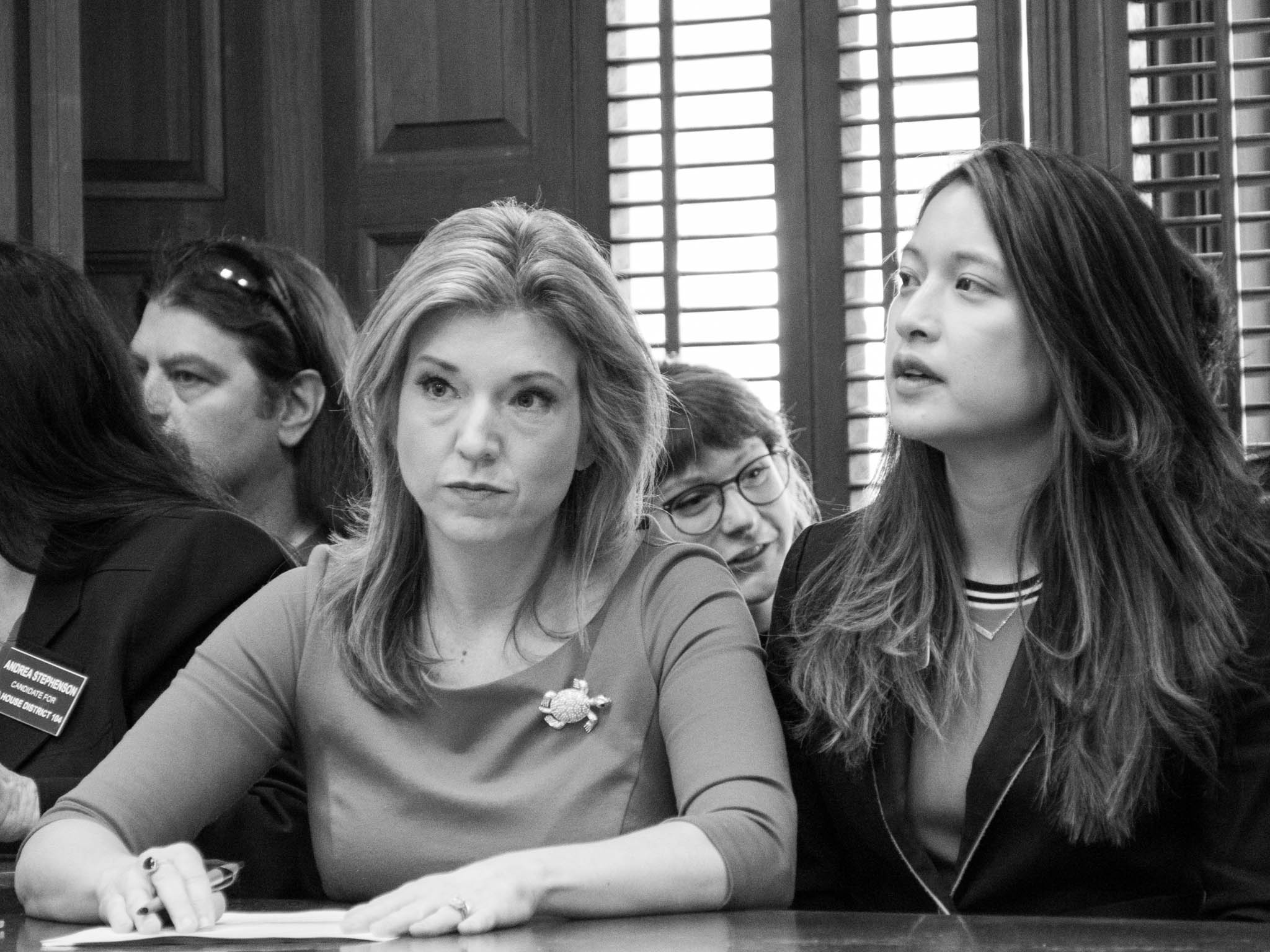
Jordan sitting next to Bee Nguyen while discussing abortion laws. (May 15, 2019)

==== Abortion ====
Georgia House Bill 481 was a bill that would have outlawed abortions 20 weeks after conception, in violation of Supreme Court precedent in Roe v. Wade and Casey v. Planned Parenthood. Jordan opposed the bill; giving a speech about her own experiences with pregnancy loss and prenatal medical care and asking Republican lawmakers not to "insert [themselves] in the most personal, private, and wrenching decisions that women make every single day."

Following her speech against the bill, she testified before the U.S. Senate Judiciary Committee in order to prevent Senate Bill 160 from being passed.

==== 2018 and 2020 elections ====
In 2018, Jordan won re-election against Republican Leah Aldridge with 58% of the vote. In 2020, Jordan won re-election against Republican Harrison Lance with 62% of the vote.

=== 2022 attorney general campaign ===
On April 14, 2021, Jordan announced she was running for attorney general of Georgia, against incumbent Christopher M. Carr. She planned to fight for women's issues, defend voting rights, prevent pollution, create new gun control laws to prevent shootings, and protect children from child predators. If she won, she would've been the first female attorney general of Georgia. She was endorsed by End Citizens United. She lost the election and conceded to Carr.

=== 2026 Supreme Court campaign ===
Jordan was defeated in the 2026 Georgia Supreme Court election for the Supreme Court of Georgia in a challenge to incumbent Sarah Warren. Her campaign was intertwined and contemporary with that of Miracle Rankin, who ran to replace incumbent Charlie Bethel. Despite being an ostensibly "Non-Partisan Election", with the candidates' party affiliations not being mentioned on the ballot, the Democratic Party of Georgia extensively supported Jordan and Rankin, and was a primary backer of their campaigns. Jordan was endorsed by prominent Democratic officials such as Jon Ossoff & Barack Obama.

== Personal life ==
Jordan is originally from South Georgia but had moved to the Atlanta area for her law practice. She and her husband, Lawton, have two children.

Party political offices
Preceded by Charlie Bailey	Democratic nominee for Attorney General of Georgia; 2022	Succeeded by Tanya Miller
