= Georgia State Agricultural and Mechanical School System =

The Georgia State Agricultural and Mechanical School System was a system of state-supported agricultural and mechanical schools established in Georgia in 1906. The schools were created by the Georgia General Assembly under the Perry Act, which provided for an agricultural and mechanical school in each congressional district of the state. The schools were intended to provide rural secondary education, with instruction emphasizing agriculture, mechanical arts, and domestic science.

== History ==
The Georgia General Assembly approved the creation of the district agricultural and mechanical schools on August 18, 1906. The act authorized the governor to establish and maintain an industrial and agricultural school in each congressional district. The schools were described as branches of the State College of Agriculture, a department of the University of Georgia.

The system initially consisted of eleven schools, later twelve, corresponding to Georgia's congressional districts. The schools offered basic high school-level instruction with an emphasis on agriculture, home economics, and practical training. Although they were considered postsecondary institutions when established, their early curricula largely served the role of rural secondary education.

One of the original schools was the Eleventh District A & M School in Douglas, Georgia. Its campus included three original 1907 buildings designed by architect Haralson Bleckley: Peterson Hall, Davis Hall, and Powell Hall. Bleckley also provided designs for buildings at several other Georgia A&M school campuses.

By the 1920s, changes in secondary and higher education contributed to the decline of the district A&M school system. The General Assembly passed the Thrash Bill in 1927, allowing some A&M schools to be converted into junior colleges. The Eleventh District A&M School became South Georgia State Junior College in 1927, South Georgia State College in 1929, and South Georgia College in 1936. It later became South Georgia State College.

Several institutions that originated as district A&M schools later developed into colleges or universities, including institutions associated with Georgia Southern University, University of West Georgia, Valdosta State University, Abraham Baldwin Agricultural College, Georgia Southwestern State University, and South Georgia State College.

== Later proposed university system ==
In 2019 the system was in the news for a proposal to merge three historically black colleges into it, by state legislative bill SB278. A revised bill would allow the three institutions to keep their original names, but was still controversial. The institutions are Albany State University, Fort Valley State University, and Savannah State University.

== See also ==
- Agricultural education
- Land-grant university
- University System of Georgia
