= Benjamin Land =

American judge

Associate Justice of the Georgia Supreme Court
- Incumbent
- Assumed office July 24, 2025
- Appointed by: Brian Kemp
- Preceded by: Michael P. Boggs

Judge of the Georgia Court of Appeals
- In office July 20, 2022 – July 23, 2025
- Appointed by: Brian Kemp
- Preceded by: Andrew Pinson
- Succeeded by: Paige Reese Whitaker

Personal details
- Born: Benjamin Arthur Land Columbus, Georgia
- Education: University of Georgia (BBA, JD)

Benjamin Arthur Land is an American lawyer who was appointed to serve as an associate justice of the Georgia Supreme Court since 2025. He served as a judge of the Georgia Court of Appeals from 2022 to 2025.

== Education ==
Land graduated from high school in his hometown of Columbus, Georgia, in 1985, and was awarded a scholarship to attend the University of Georgia. He received a Bachelor of Business Administration summa cum laude from the University of Georgia in 1989 and his Juris Doctor summa cum laude, with him finishing with the second-best GPA in his class, from the University of Georgia School of Law in 1992. While at Georgia Law, Land served on the editorial board for the Georgia Law Review, clerked with Georgia Supreme Court justice George T. Smith, and was elected to the Order of the Coif.

== Legal career ==
After graduating from law school, Land chose to join Jerry Buchanan and his brother Clay at a recently created law firm in Columbus rather than join a larger firm in Atlanta. Land stayed at the firm ten years with Clay, until the latter was nominated by George W. Bush to a seat on the United States District Court for the Middle District of Georgia, and 25 1/2 years with Buchanan. Land's speciality as a lawyer was dealing with complex civil litigation. While he worked in Columbus, Land was the president of the Columbus Inn of Court and the Columbus Bar Association.

== Judicial career ==
=== Chattahoochee Judicial Circuit ===
Land left private practice on February 7, 2018, when he was appointed by Georgia Governor Nathan Deal to serve as Muscogee County Superior Court judge as a part of the Chattahoochee Judicial Circuit. He served as the president of the Chattahoochee Judicial Circuit Bar Association while in that position.

=== Georgia Court of Appeals ===
On February 14, 2022, Land was appointed to the Georgia Court of Appeals to replace judge Andrew Pinson by governor Brian Kemp. Land became the first person from Columbus to serve on the Court of Appeals in its history. Land won reelection as judge in 2024, with no opposition running against him. In January 2025, Land and two of his colleagues ruled that Fulton County District Attorney Fani Willis could not revive her racketeering case against president Donald Trump. This came a month after Land opposed a ruling by those same colleagues that Willis should be disqualified from the 2020 Georgia election investigation because of the latter's relationship with special prosecutor Nathan Wade.

=== Georgia Supreme Court ===
On July 17, 2025, Land was appointed to the Supreme Court of Georgia by Brian Kemp to replace outgoing judge Michael P. Boggs. He was sworn in on July 24. Land ran unopposed in the 2026 Supreme Court election, and won reelection.

Legal offices
| Preceded by Michael P. Boggs | Associate Justice of the Georgia Supreme Court; 2025–present | Incumbent |
