= Britt Grant =

American judge (born 1978)

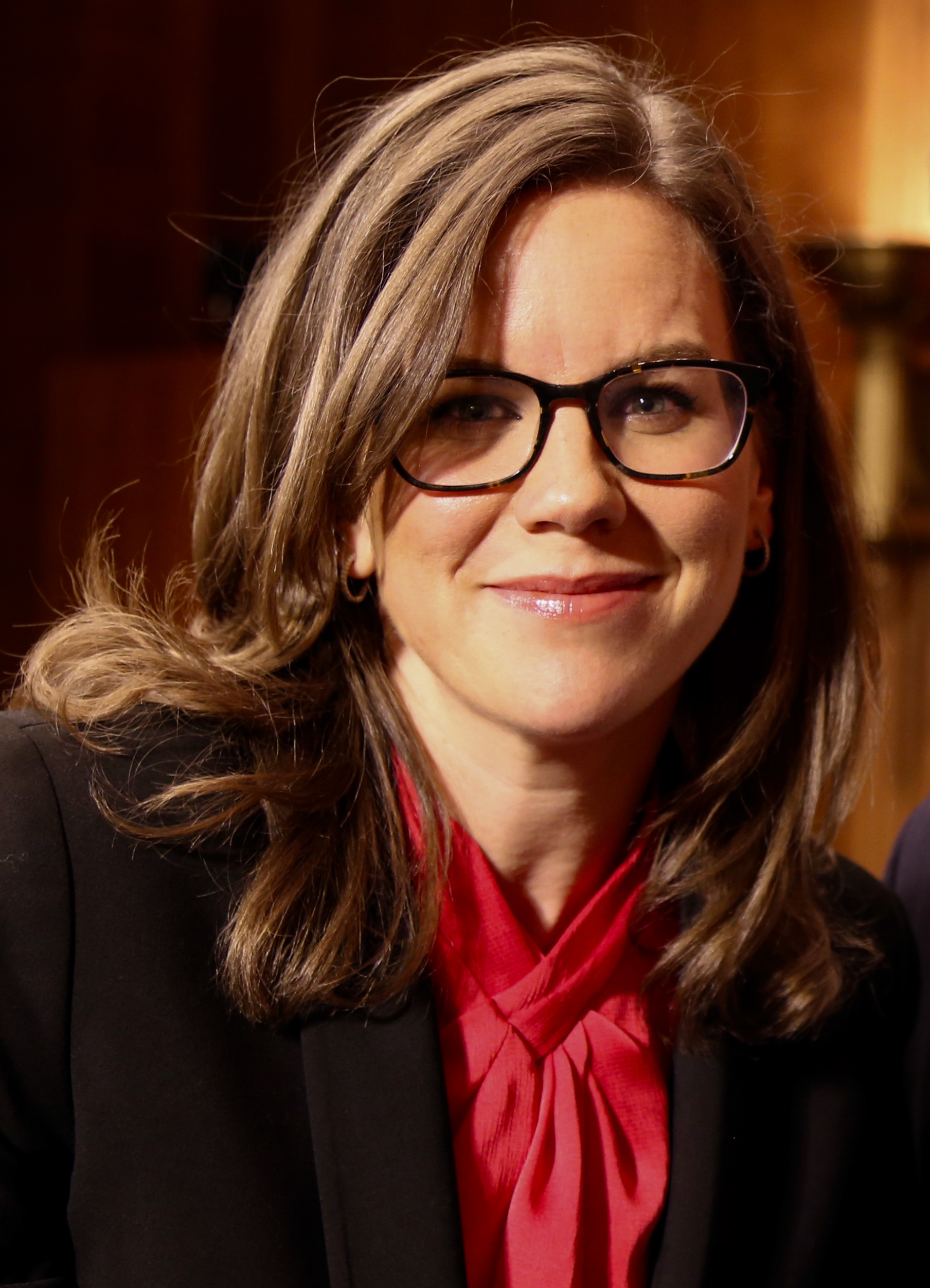

Judge of the United States Court of Appeals for the Eleventh Circuit
- Incumbent
- Assumed office August 3, 2018
- Appointed by: Donald Trump
- Preceded by: Julie E. Carnes

Associate Justice of the Georgia Supreme Court
- In office January 1, 2017 – August 3, 2018
- Appointed by: Nathan Deal
- Preceded by: Seat established
- Succeeded by: Sarah Hawkins Warren

Solicitor General of Georgia
- In office January 6, 2015 – January 1, 2017
- Governor: Nathan Deal
- Preceded by: Nels S. D. Peterson
- Succeeded by: Sarah Hawkins Warren

Personal details
- Born: Elizabeth Britt Cagle; 1978 (age 47–48) Atlanta, Georgia, U.S.
- Party: Republican
- Spouse: Justin Grant
- Children: 3
- Education: Wake Forest University (BA); Stanford University (JD)

Britt Cagle Grant (née Cagle; born 1978) is an American attorney and judge who is a United States circuit judge of the United States Court of Appeals for the Eleventh Circuit. She is a former Justice of the Supreme Court of Georgia.

== Early life and legal career ==
Grant was born Elizabeth Britt Cagle in Atlanta, Georgia. Grant attended high school at The Westminster Schools. She studied English literature and politics at Wake Forest University, graduating with a Bachelor of Arts, summa cum laude, in 2000.

From 2000 to 2004, Grant worked for then-Congressman Nathan Deal in Washington, D.C., and served in various roles in the administration of President George W. Bush. She then attended Stanford Law School, where she was a managing editor of the Stanford Journal of International Law and a senior articles editor of the Stanford Law and Policy Review. Grant also served as president of the school's Federalist Society chapter. She graduated with a Juris Doctor with distinction in 2007.

Grant was a law clerk to then-Judge Brett Kavanaugh of the United States Court of Appeals for the District of Columbia Circuit from 2007 to 2008. From 2008 to 2012, Grant was in private practice at the law firm Kirkland & Ellis. From 2012 to 2014, she was an attorney for legal policy in the Office of the Georgia Attorney General.

== State Solicitor General and appointment to state Supreme Court ==
From 2015 to 2017, Grant was Solicitor General for the State of Georgia. On January 1, 2017, Governor Nathan Deal appointed her to a seat on the Supreme Court of Georgia. On November 17, 2017, Grant was named by President Donald Trump as a potential nominee to the Supreme Court of the United States. On August 3, 2018, her service on the state supreme court was terminated when she was elevated to the United States Court of Appeals for the Eleventh Circuit.

== Federal judicial service ==
On April 10, 2018, President Donald Trump nominated Grant to serve as a United States circuit judge of the United States Court of Appeals for the Eleventh Circuit. She was nominated to the seat vacated by the retirement of Judge Julie E. Carnes, who subsequently assumed senior status on June 18, 2018. On May 23, 2018, a hearing on her nomination was held before the Senate Judiciary Committee. On July 19, 2018, her nomination was reported out of committee by an 11–10 vote. On July 30, 2018, the United States Senate invoked cloture on her nomination by a 52–44 vote. On July 31, 2018, Grant was confirmed by a 52–46 vote. She received her judicial commission on August 3, 2018.

In November 2020, Grant wrote for the divided panel majority when it found that a municipality's ban on minor conversion therapy violated the First Amendment to the United States Constitution.

== Personal life ==
She is married to Justin G. Grant, who worked for the Central Intelligence Agency. They have three children.

== Electoral history ==
2018

Georgia Supreme Court Results, May 22, 2018
Party	Candidate	Votes	%
Nonpartisan	Britt Grant (incumbent)	896,313	100.00%
Majority		896,313	100.00%
Total votes		896,313	100.00%

== See also ==
- Donald Trump Supreme Court candidates

Legal offices
New seat	Associate Justice of the Georgia Supreme Court; 2017–2018	Succeeded by Sarah Hawkins Warren
Preceded by Julie E. Carnes	Judge of the United States Court of Appeals for the Eleventh Circuit; 2018–present	Incumbent
