= Miracle Rankin =

American personal injury attorney

Personal details
- Born: Louisiana, U.S.
- Party: Democratic
- Education: Spelman College (BA); University of Georgia (JD)

ShaMiracle Johnson Rankin is an American personal injury attorney based in Atlanta, Georgia. A graduate of Spelman College and the University of Georgia School of Law, she also served as the 40th president of the Georgia Association of Black Women Attorneys. She is currently a partner at Morgan & Morgan. In 2026, she announced her candidacy for the Supreme Court of Georgia which she lost to incumbent justice Charlie Bethel.

== Early life and education ==
Rankin is a native of Louisiana. She attended Spelman College, where she received a Bachelor of Arts in English language and literature in 2006. While at Spelman, she joined the Alpha Kappa Alpha sorority. She subsequently earned her Juris Doctor degree from the University of Georgia School of Law in 2009.

== Career ==
Since law school, Rankin has been a practicing attorney in Georgia since 2010. She was a partner at The CP Law Group in Atlanta where she served as defense counsel for two Fortune 500 insurance companies. She then joined Morgan & Morgan in 2022. Rankin has spent most of her career focusing on personal injury litigation. She is a former president of the Georgia Association of Black Women Attorneys.

=== Supreme Court of Georgia campaign ===
Rankin announced her candidacy in a joint press conference with former State Sen. Jen Jordan (D), a fellow personal injury attorney who is running for another seat as a challenger in the nonpartisan state Supreme Court election on May 19, 2026. In her announcement, Rankin argued that the state Supreme Court needed to "stand up for Georgia's civil liberties that are being stripped away." She stressed the need for judicial independence in the role as part of her campaign. Rankin and Jordan's sudden announcements were noted by The Atlanta Journal-Constitution to have "stunned the legal establishment" because it was unexpected. Rankin and Jordan announced in May 2026 that they were seeking to file a lawsuit under seal against the Judicial Qualifications Commission, noting in a public statement that they were trying to "prevent irreparable harm to their campaigns."

Although nonpartisan, the Democratic Party and other organizations affiliated with it have announced their support of Rankin's campaign, with the AJC noting that Democrats were "aggressively campaigning" for the election. The Chair of the Democratic Party of Georgia noted that Rankin's race was one of two that were "the most money that the Georgia Democratic Party has spent in judicial races in 20 years." At an annual Democratic gala in Atlanta, Senator Jon Ossoff praised both Rankin and Jordan's candidacies. In April 2026, Rankin received endorsements from the Service Employees International Union and the Georgia Conservation Voters, and in May, Reproductive Freedom for All and Planned Parenthood Votes announced their endorsements of Rankin's campaign.

Rankin lost to incumbent Justice Charlie Bethel in the election by a margin of 51.1% to 48.8%.

== Personal life ==
Rankin is married and has two children. At 32 years old, she was diagnosed with stage-one breast cancer.
