= Rilla Moran Woods =

First elected president of The National Federation of Democratic Women

Rilla Moran Woods (1924–2011) was the first elected president of The National Federation of Democratic Women and the first woman to serve as Director of Public Affairs for the United States General Services Administration.
