= Christian A. Coomer =

American judge (born 1974)

Judge of the Georgia Court of Appeals
- In office October 31, 2018 – August 16, 2023
- Appointed by: Nathan Deal
- Preceded by: Charlie Bethel
- Succeeded by: J. Wade Padgett

Member of the Georgia House of Representatives from the 14th District
- In office January 10, 2011 – October 15, 2018
- Preceded by: Barry Loudermilk
- Succeeded by: Mitchell Scoggins

Personal details
- Born: Christian Aaron Coomer; October 31, 1974 (age 51)
- Spouse: Heidi Coomer
- Children: 3
- Education: Lee University (BA); University of Georgia (JD); Air Command and Staff College

Christian Aaron Coomer (born October 31, 1974) is an American lawyer who served as a judge of the Georgia Court of Appeals from 2018 to 2023, representative in the Georgia House of Representatives from 2011 to 2018, and an active-duty Air Force Judge Advocate from 2001 to 2005, Georgia Air National Guard Judge Advocate and Reserve Judge Advocate from 2005 to 2025.

In August 2023, Coomer was removed from office by the Georgia Supreme Court for "patterns of bad faith behavior" with regard to a former client he represented in 2015-2016.

== Education ==
Coomer received his Bachelor of Arts in Communication from Lee University in Cleveland, Tennessee and earned his Juris Doctor at the University of Georgia School of Law.

== Career ==
=== Law practice and military service ===
Coomer's professional experience included operating his own law practice and serving as a judge advocate in the U.S. Air Force Reserve's JAG Corps. Coomer spent four years on active duty with the United States Air Force. Upon separating from active duty, he began serving in the reserve component as a member of Georgia Air National Guard and the Air Force Reserve. He has worked as a special assistant United States attorney, in which he represented the Air Force in labor and employment matters before federal and state agencies, served as general counsel to a military hospital, prosecuted courts-martial, trained military members on law enforcement standards and the law of armed conflict, and managed the General Courts-Martial docket in the Air Force. Coomer completed Air Command and Staff College. He has been awarded the Air Force Meritorious Service Medal and the Global War on Terrorism Service Medal, among other awards and decorations. He has attained the rank of lieutenant colonel.

=== State legislator service ===
Coomer served as a Republican in the Georgia House of Representatives for District 14 from 2011 to 2018. He served as Republican majority whip Chairman of the House Committee on Transportation, and as Administration Floor Leader. He was a member of the standing committees on Appropriations, Banks and Banking, Ethics, Judiciary Noncivil, Juvenile Justice, Retirement, Rules, and Transportation. He was also appointed to the Public Defender Council Legislative Oversight Committee, the Fiscal Affairs Oversight Joint Subcommittee, the Juvenile Justice State Advisory Group, and the Transit Study Commission. In 2017, Governor Deal appointed Coomer to the Court Reform Commission. The same year, Coomer was named Legislator of the Year by the Georgia Chamber of Commerce.

=== Judicial career ===
==== Appointment to Adairsville Municipal Court ====
In 2013, Coomer was appointed to a vacant seat on the Adairsville, Georgia, Municipal Court. He served as a judge until 2014.

==== Appointment to Georgia Court of Appeals ====
On September 14, 2018, Coomer was appointed to the seat vacated by Charlie Bethel. His appointment was effective October 31, 2018.

==== Consideration for Georgia Supreme Court ====
In 2018 Coomer was among three candidates under consideration for the Supreme Court of Georgia after the retirement of Harris Hines.

=== Controversies and removal ===
On March 6, 2020, Coomer was accused in a lawsuit by a former client of malpractice and fraud. He publicly denied allegations he had defrauded his former client.

The Atlanta Journal-Constitution reported in May 2020 that the Georgia Bureau of Investigation allegedly opened an investigation into Coomer based, at least in part, on the lawsuit filed by his former client for fraud and malpractice.

Coomer settled the fraud and malpractice lawsuit brought by his former client sometime in late July 2020, and the case was dismissed by the former client with prejudice.

The Georgia Judicial Qualifications Commission filed formal charges against Coomer on December 28, 2020. The Georgia Supreme Court rejected the recommendations of the Commission as made, the Commission made revised recommendations and, on August 16, 2023, the Georgia Supreme Court removed Christian from office for patterns of bad faith behavior regarding his use of campaign funds and his dealings with a legal client. The former client that had sued Christian had said, “If I’d have thought all this would happen I don’t think I would have said a word. He’s a good man.”

On November 19, 2024, the Supreme Court of Georgia accepted Coomer’s amended petition for voluntary discipline and suspended his law license for two years, nunc pro tunc to August 16, 2023, after he admitted violating several Georgia Rules of Professional Conduct in connection with his representation and business transactions with his former client. He was ineligible to practice law until August 16, 2025.

== Personal ==
Christian met his wife, Heidi, at Lee University. They have three children, Christian, Collin, and Vivian. Coomer is a member of Adairsville Church of God.

Legal offices
Preceded by Charlie Bethel	Judge of the Georgia Court of Appeals; 2018–2023	Succeeded by Jeffrey A. Watkins
