= Michael P. Boggs =

American judge (born 1962)

Michael Boggs
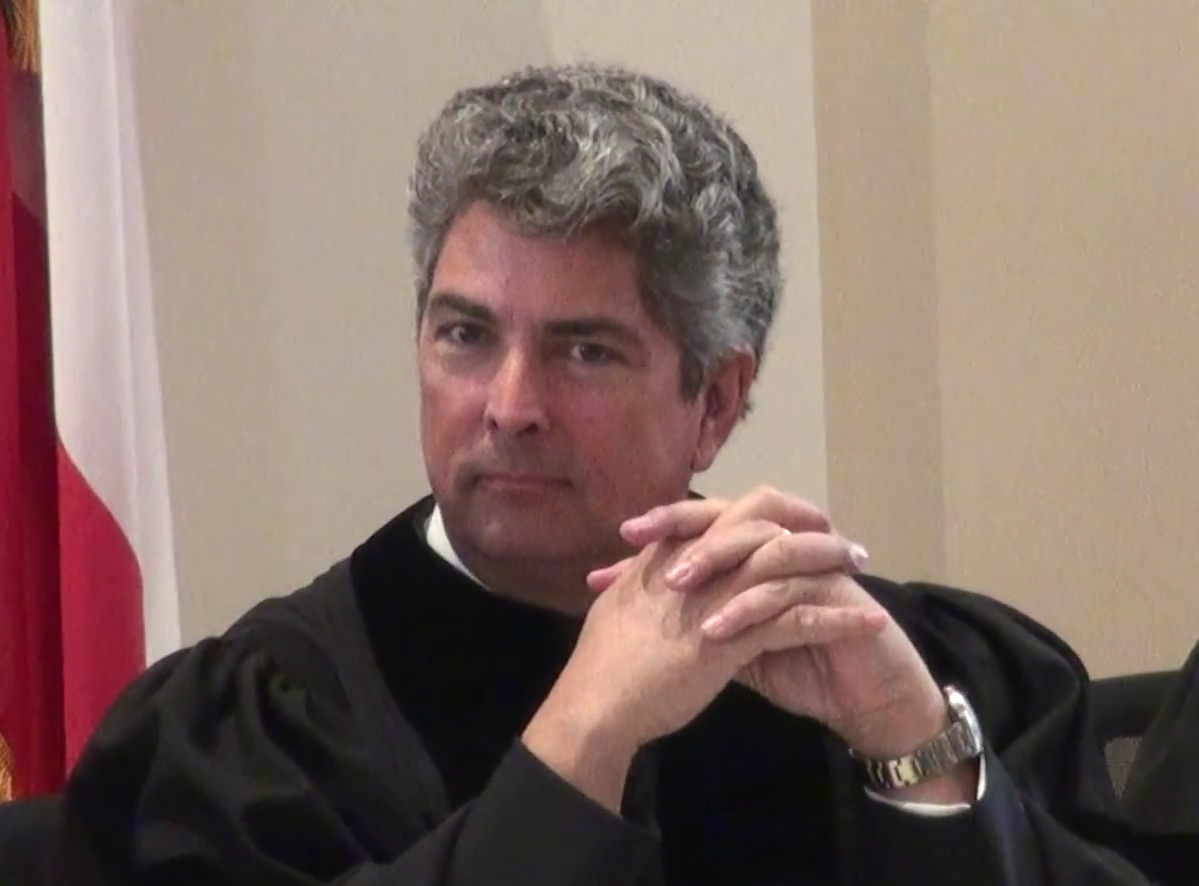

Chief Justice of the Georgia Supreme Court
- In office July 18, 2022 – March 31, 2025
- Preceded by: David Nahmias
- Succeeded by: Nels S. D. Peterson

Associate Justice of the Georgia Supreme Court
- In office January 1, 2017 – March 31, 2025
- Appointed by: Nathan Deal
- Preceded by: Hugh P. Thompson
- Succeeded by: Benjamin Land

Judge of the Georgia Court of Appeals
- In office 2012–2016
- Appointed by: Nathan Deal
- Preceded by: J. D. Smith
- Succeeded by: Charlie Bethel

Member of the Georgia House of Representatives from the 168th district
- In office January 8, 2001 – January 10, 2005
- Preceded by: Harry D. Dixon
- Succeeded by: Tommy Smith

Personal details
- Born: December 28, 1962 (age 63) Largo, Florida, U.S.
- Party: Democratic
- Education: Georgia Institute of Technology (attended); Waycross College (attended); Georgia Southern University (BA); Mercer University (JD)

Michael P. Boggs (born December 28, 1962) is an American lawyer who served as the chief justice of the Supreme Court of Georgia from 2022 until 2025. He served as an associate justice of the court starting in 2017. He is a former judge of the Georgia Court of Appeals and a former nominee to be a United States district judge of the United States District Court for the Northern District of Georgia. He was appointed to the state Supreme Court by Georgia Governor Nathan Deal.

== Biography ==
Boggs received a Bachelor of Arts in 1985 from Georgia Southern College. He received a Juris Doctor in 1990 from the Walter F. George School of Law at Mercer University. From 1990 to 1998, he served as an attorney in private practice at a number of law firms.

From 1998 to 2005, he was a sole practitioner. In 2000, he was elected as a Democrat to the Georgia House of Representatives, holding office until 2004. From 2004 to 2012, he served as a Superior Court judge of the Waycross Judicial Circuit of the First Judicial Administrative District of Georgia of the Georgia Superior Court, where he established and presided over the court's felony drug court program. From January 2012 to 2017, he served as a judge of the Georgia Court of Appeals.

=== Failed nomination to U.S. district court ===
On December 19, 2013, President Barack Obama nominated Boggs to serve as a United States district judge of the United States District Court for the Northern District of Georgia, to the seat expected to be vacated by Judge Julie E. Carnes, who was nominated to United States Court of Appeals for the Eleventh Circuit on the same day. His nomination was pending before the Senate Judiciary Committee, however, Sen. Patrick J. Leahy, who led the Judiciary Committee, told The New York Times that "it had become clear after talking to his colleagues that Mr. Boggs, under fire from Democrats for his conservative positions, could not win committee support....Mr. Boggs earns the unusual distinction as the first Obama judicial nominee this term to fail because of Democratic opposition." David Scott, U.S. Representative Georgia's 13th district, criticized the nomination of Boggs because of Boggs' votes in the legislature to retain Confederate insignia in the state flag of Georgia, restrict abortion, and ban same-sex marriage. Boggs was nominated as part of a group of nominees that won approval of Georgia's U.S. senators, to allow votes on their nominations as part of a "package deal." He received a hearing before the full panel of the United States Senate Judiciary Committee on May 13, 2014.

On December 30, 2014, retiring Sen. Saxby Chambliss (R-GA) revealed that he had been advised in late November by White House Chief of Staff Denis McDonough that Boggs would not be renominated in 2015 for confirmation by the 114th Congress.

=== Service on Georgia Supreme Court ===
On November 9, 2016 Governor Nathan Deal appointed three new justices to the Georgia Supreme Court, including Boggs. He was seated on January 1, 2017. He won the 2018 and 2024 Georgia judicial elections uncontested. He became chief justice on July 18, 2022. In February 2025, he announced his intention to retire from the Supreme Court and return to private practice. Subsequently, the court elected Nels S.D. Peterson to become the next chief justice.

== See also ==
- Barack Obama judicial appointment controversies

Legal offices
Preceded by Hugh P. Thompson	Associate Justice of the Georgia Supreme Court; 2017–2025	Succeeded by Benjamin Land
Preceded by David Nahmias	Chief Justice of the Georgia Supreme Court; 2022–2025	Succeeded by Nels S. D. Peterson
