= Andrew Pinson =

American judge (born 1985 or 1986)

Associate Justice of the Supreme Court of Georgia
- Incumbent
- Assumed office July 20, 2022
- Appointed by: Brian Kemp
- Preceded by: David Nahmias

Judge of the Georgia Court of Appeals
- In office August 30, 2021 – July 20, 2022
- Appointed by: Brian Kemp
- Preceded by: Verda Colvin
- Succeeded by: Ben Land

Personal details
- Born: Andrew Alan Pinson; 1986 (age 39–40)
- Education: University of Georgia (BBA, JD)

Andrew Alan Pinson (born 1986) is an American lawyer who was appointed to serve as an associate justice of the Georgia Supreme Court since 2022. He served as a judge of the Georgia Court of Appeals from 2021 to 2022.

== Education ==
Pinson received a Bachelor of Business Administration in finance summa cum laude from the University of Georgia and his Juris Doctor summa cum laude from the University of Georgia School of Law. While at Georgia Law, he served as Executive Articles Editor for the Georgia Law Review.

== Legal career ==
Pinson served as a law clerk to judge David B. Sentelle of the United States Court of Appeals for the District of Columbia Circuit and then to associate justice Clarence Thomas of the Supreme Court of the United States. Pinson was a lawyer at Jones Day in Atlanta where he served in the issues and appeals practice. He then went on to be the Deputy Solicitor General and later Solicitor General of Georgia, taking office on September 16, 2018, after the elevation of Sarah Hawkins Warren to the Supreme Court.

== Judicial career ==
=== Georgia Court of Appeals ===
Pinson was sworn in as a judge of the Georgia Court of Appeals on August 31, 2021, after being appointed by Georgia Governor Brian Kemp, becoming one of the youngest members at age 35.

=== Georgia Supreme Court ===
==== Appointment ====
In July 2021, Pinson was one of six candidates under consideration for appointment to the Georgia Supreme Court following the retirement of justice Harold Melton, the seat was eventually filled by Verda Colvin. On February 14, 2022, the governor appointed Pinson to be an associate justice of the Georgia Supreme Court following the resignation of David Nahmias July 17, 2022. He was sworn into office on July 20, 2022. Pinson was succeeded by Ben Land on the court of appeals.

==== Election to full term ====
In May 2024, Pinson was elected to a full term on the Supreme Court over former U.S. Representative John Barrow by a 55% to 45% margin.

== See also ==
- List of law clerks for the tenth seat of the Supreme Court of the United States

Legal offices
Preceded by David Nahmias	Associate Justice of the Supreme Court of Georgia; 2022–present	Incumbent
