= Tyree Building =

- U.S. National Register of Historic Places
- U.S. Historic district – Contributing property
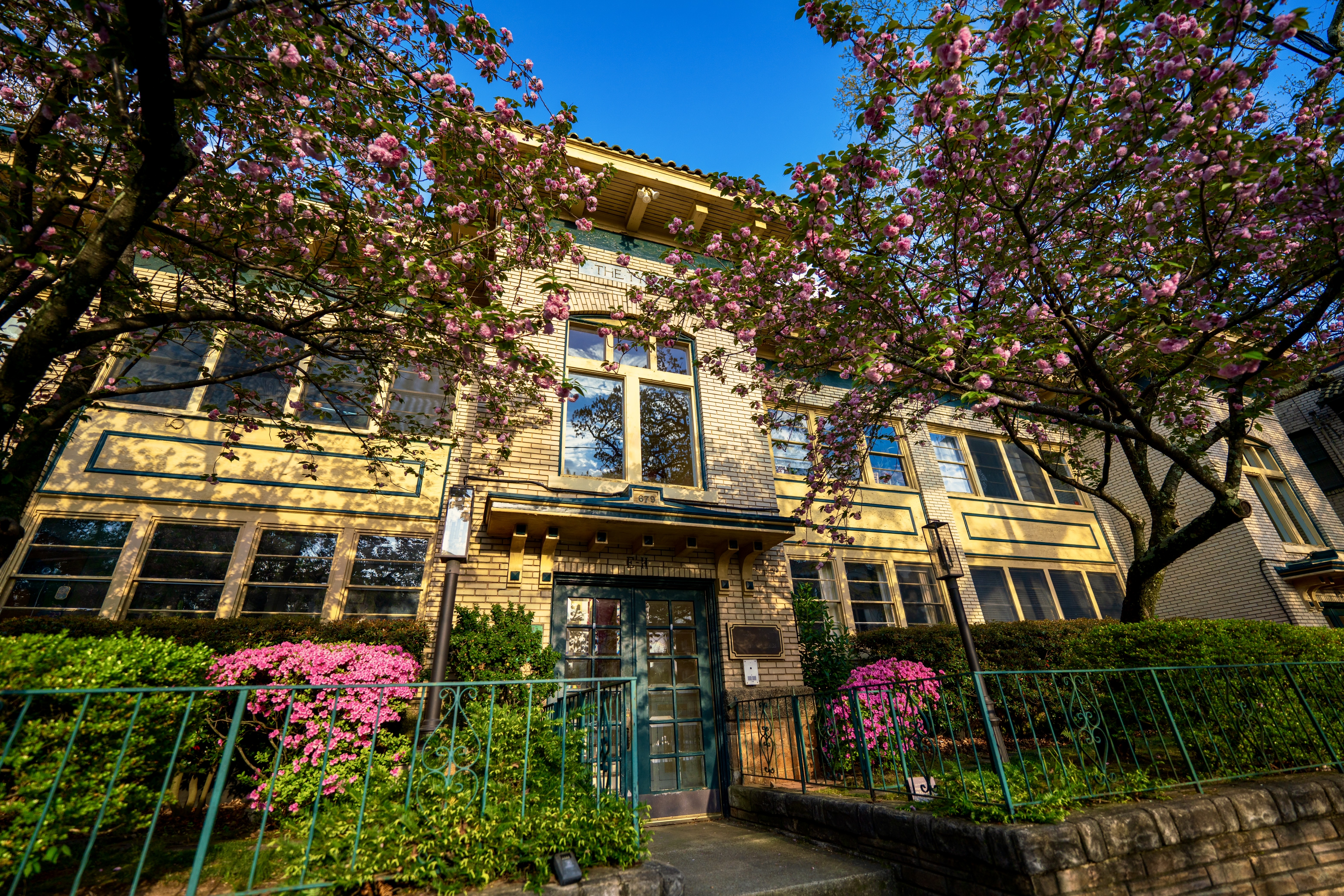
- Building in the spring of 2026

- Location within Georgia
- Location: 679 Durant Pl., NE, Atlanta, Georgia
- Coordinates: 33°46′23″N 84°22′31″W
- Area: less than one acre
- Built: 1915-16
- Architect: Haralson Bleckley
- Part of: Midtown Historic District
- NRHP reference No.: 82002421
- Added to NRHP: July 15, 1982

The Tyree Building is an apartment building located at 679 Durant Place NE, in Atlanta, Georgia. It was designed by Haralson Bleckley and was one of the earliest garden apartments buildings in Atlanta. It was built in 1915–16. Since 1982, it has been listed on the National Register of Historic Places.

The Tyree is one of the first buildings in Atlanta built in the Beaux-Arts style. Only a few out of many Atlanta apartment buildings designed by Bleckley have survived. The apartments were converted into condominiums in 1980.
