= Griffin Commercial Historic District =

Historic district in Georgia, United States

- U.S. National Register of Historic Places
- U.S. Historic district
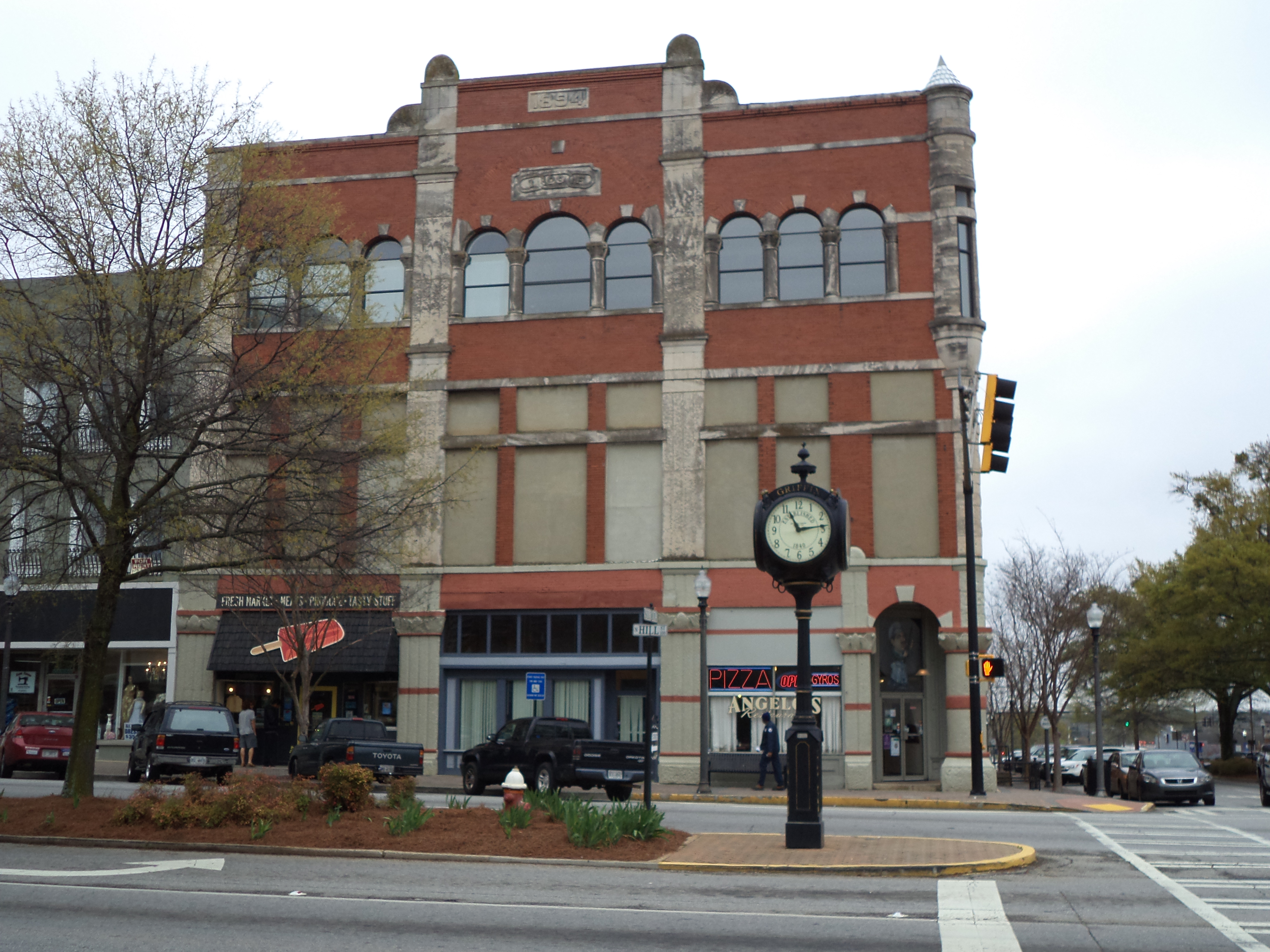
- Griffin Building on N. Hill St. (GA 155) and E Solomon St. Built in 1894

- Location within Georgia Location within the United States
- Location: Roughly bounded by Central Alley, Sixth, Taylor and Eighth Sts., Griffin, Georgia
- Coordinates: 33°14′57″N 84°15′51″W
- Area: 28 acres (11 ha)
- Built: 1895; 131 years ago
- Architect: Haralson Bleckley, others
- Architectural style: Late 19th and Early 20th Century American Movements, Late 19th And 20th Century Revivals, Italianate
- NRHP reference No.: 88002310
- Added to NRHP: November 16, 1988

The Griffin Commercial Historic District, in Griffin, Georgia, is a 28 acres (11 ha) historic district which was listed on the National Register of Historic Places in 1988. It included 93 contributing buildings, two contributing structures, and a contributing site. The district is roughly bounded by Central Alley, Sixth, Taylor and Eighth Streets.

The area, covering about eight city blocks, includes:

- Griffin City Hall (the historic one, designed by Haralson Bleckley)
- Opera House/Odd Fellows Hall (1892), a Romanesque-style three-story brick building with stone details
- Griffin Hotel (c.1910), designed by Atlanta architect Haralson Bleckley. It is a brick two-story U-shaped building.
- many other commercial buildings
- at least three churches
