= David Nahmias =

American judge

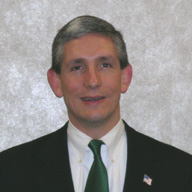

Chief Justice of the Georgia Supreme Court
- In office July 1, 2021 – July 17, 2022
- Preceded by: Harold Melton
- Succeeded by: Michael P. Boggs

Associate Justice of the Georgia Supreme Court
- In office September 3, 2009 – July 17, 2022
- Appointed by: Sonny Perdue
- Preceded by: Leah Ward Sears
- Succeeded by: Andrew Pinson

United States Attorney for the Northern District of Georgia
- In office 2004–2009
- President: George W. Bush
- Preceded by: William S. Duffey Jr.
- Succeeded by: Sally Yates

Personal details
- Born: September 11, 1964 (age 61)
- Education: Duke University (BA); Harvard University (JD)

David E. Nahmias (born September 11, 1964) is an American lawyer who served as a justice of the Supreme Court of Georgia from 2009 to 2021 and as its chief justice from 2021 to 2022. He is the former United States Attorney for the Northern District of Georgia. Nahmias is currently a partner at the law firm Jones Day.

== Background and early career ==
Nahmias attended Briarcliff High School and was Georgia's STAR student. He graduated from Duke University as salutatorian in 1986 with a Bachelor of Arts, summa cum laude, in political science. He later attended Harvard Law School, where he was an editor of the Harvard Law Review along with Barack Obama. He graduated from Harvard in 1991 with a Juris Doctor, magna cum laude.

== Career ==
After law school, Nahmias was a law clerk to Judge Laurence H. Silberman of the U.S. Court of Appeals for the District of Columbia Circuit from 1991 to 1992 and then to Justice Antonin Scalia of the U.S. Supreme Court from 1992 to 1993.

He worked for law firm of Hogan & Hartson in Washington, D.C. In 1995, Nahmias joined the U.S. Attorney's Office in Atlanta in January. In October 2001, Nahmias was detailed to the United States Department of Justice Criminal Division in Washington to serve as Counsel to the Assistant Attorney General.

After being nominated by President George W. Bush and confirmed by the United States Senate, on December 1, 2004, Nahmias returned home to Atlanta to take office as the United States Attorney for the Northern District of Georgia.

=== Georgia Supreme Court ===
Nahmias was named to the Supreme Court of Georgia by Governor Sonny Perdue on August 13, 2009, to fill the vacancy left by the resignation of Leah Ward Sears. He took office on September 3, 2009, and won re-election in November 2010. On September 4, 2018, Nahmias was sworn in as Presiding Justice, replacing Harold Melton, who became Chief Justice on the same day. He was sworn in as Chief Justice on July 1, 2021. He resigned on July 17, 2022.

In 2020, Nahmias wrote a ruling that authorized a loophole that allowed any Georgia Supreme Court judge who faces a serious re-election challenge to resign and have the Georgia governor appoint a new judge to a full term, thus disincentivizing challenges against incumbents and undermining competitive elections.

== See also ==
- List of law clerks for the ninth seat of the Supreme Court of the United States

Legal offices
Preceded by Leah Ward Sears	Associate Justice of the Georgia Supreme Court; 2009–2022	Succeeded by Andrew Pinson
Preceded by Harold Melton	Chief Justice of the Georgia Supreme Court; 2021–2022	Succeeded by Michael P. Boggs
