= Georgia's 14th House of Representatives district =

State district in Georgia, USA

Georgia's 14th State House of Representatives district
Representative
Mitchell Scoggins; R–Cartersville
- Demographics: 85.2% White; 7.8% Black; 5.7% Hispanic; 0.3% Asian
- Population: 53,839

District 14 elects one member of the Georgia House of Representatives. It contains parts of Bartow County and Cherokee County.

== Members ==
- Barry Loudermilk (2005–2011)
- Christian A. Coomer (2011–2018)
- Mitchell Scoggins (since 2019)
