= South Georgia State College =

Public college in Douglas and Waycross, Georgia, US

- Type: Public college
- Established: 1906
- Parent institution: University System of Georgia
- President: Dr Gregory M. Tanner, EdD
- Students: 2,346
- Location: Douglas and Waycross, Georgia, United States; 31°29′45″N 82°51′19″W
- Campus: Suburban, 190 acres (77 ha)
- Colors: Navy and gray
- Nickname: Hawks
- Sporting affiliations: NJCAA Division I, GCAA
- Website: sgsc.edu

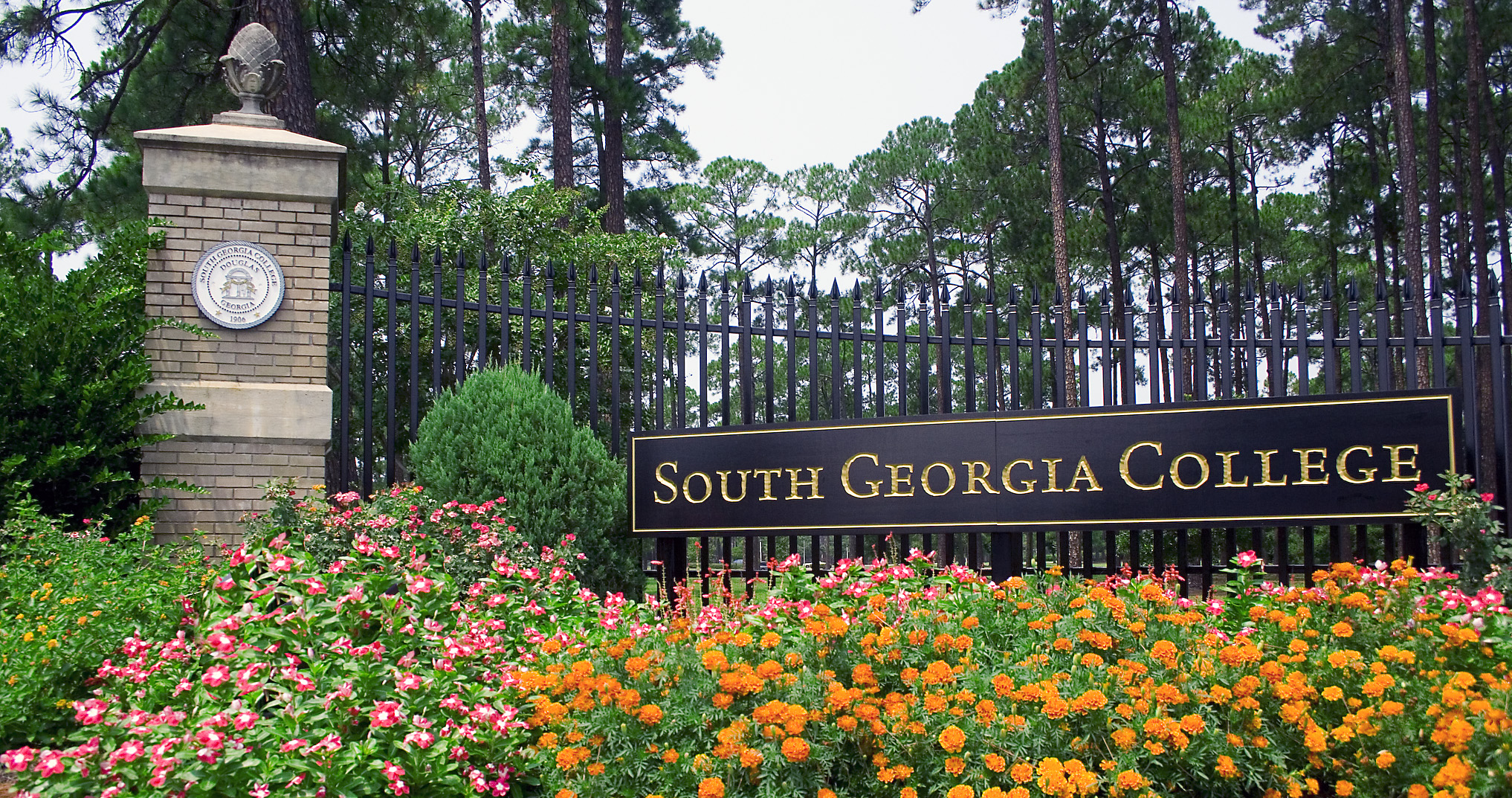
Front gate of South Georgia State College, 2017

South Georgia State College is a public college in Douglas and Waycross, Georgia, United States. It is part of the University System of Georgia.

== History ==
=== Eleventh District A & M School ===
On August 18, 1906, the Georgia General Assembly enacted the Perry Act approving the construction of a secondary-level school in each of Georgia's congressional districts. At the time, few rural residents of Georgia received more than an eighth-grade education. The Eleventh District A & M School was one of the eleven (later twelve) educational centers created to cater to the predominantly agricultural-based economy in Georgia.

Douglas, the seat of government for Coffee County, was selected as one of the original eleven towns for the location of an A & M school. Its residents collected $55,000 in cash and 30 acres (12 hectares) of land, then valued at $50 per acre (.4 hectares), to be donated towards the construction of the school. Unlike other towns in the Eleventh District, Douglas added free water and electricity for ten years to its bid as an extra incentive. Douglas was a fast-growing town with a population that grew from only 617 in 1900 to 1,600 people in 1907. Construction started the same year and the agriculture school began offering classes in 1908. Charles Wesley Davis, a Tennessee-native, was hired as the first principal with the mandate to develop a comprehensive high school curriculum beyond vocational studies.

=== South Georgia College ===
The school became Georgia's first state-supported two-year college in 1927. In 1932 South Georgia State College emerged as one of the original 26 institutions of the University System of Georgia. Joseph Meriwether Thrash joined the faculty in 1907, and later served as the fifth principal of the A & M School. He became the college's first president in 1927.

The other original school, Waycross College, was established by the University System of Georgia as a two-year college in the Ware County-Waycross area by the Board of Regents in December 1970. A site for the College was approved by the Board in February 1973 and the name Waycross Junior College was approved by the Board of Regents in January 1975. The institution opened for classes in September 1976. In June 1987, the name was officially changed to Waycross College. Dr. James Dye was its first president, serving in that capacity until 1996.

In January 2012, the Board of Regents of the University System of Georgia approved the merger of South Georgia College with Waycross College. The new institution was established in January 2013 as South Georgia State College.

== Campus ==
Undergraduate demographics as of Fall 2023
| Race and ethnicity | Total |
|---|---|
| White | 57% |
| Black | 25% |
| Hispanic | 12% |
| Two or more races | 3% |
| Unknown | 2% |
| International student | 1% |
Economic diversity
| Low-income (Note: The percentage of students who received an income-based federal Pell grant intended for low-income students.) | 61% |
| Affluent (Note: The percentage of students who are a part of the American middle class at the bare minimum.) | 39% |

- Eleventh District A & M School-South Georgia College Historic District
- U.S. National Register of Historic Places
- U.S. Historic district
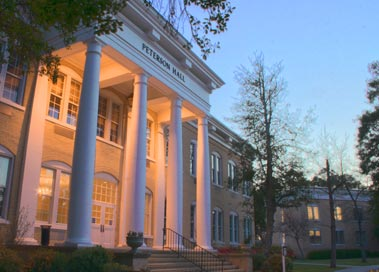
- Peterson Hall

- Location within Georgia Location within the United States
- Location: 100 West College Park Drive, Douglas, Georgia
- Area: 190 acres (77 ha)
- Built: 1906
- Architect: Bleckley, Haralson; Abreu & Robeson
- Architectural style: International Style, Late 19th And 20th Century Revivals
- NRHP reference No.: 10000274
- Added to NRHP: May 21, 2010

The Eleventh District A & M School-South Georgia College Historic District was named a historic district on the National Register of Historic Places in 2010. Some of the contributing buildings and structures are the 1907 semi-circular drive with the surrounding buildings: Peterson Hall, Davis Hall, and Powell Hall that were designed by Haralson Bleckley, the Atlanta architect who also designed Georgia's other A & M Schools. Other buildings include the IT-Nursing Building, Stubbs Hall, Tanner Hall, and Alumni House.

=== Library ===
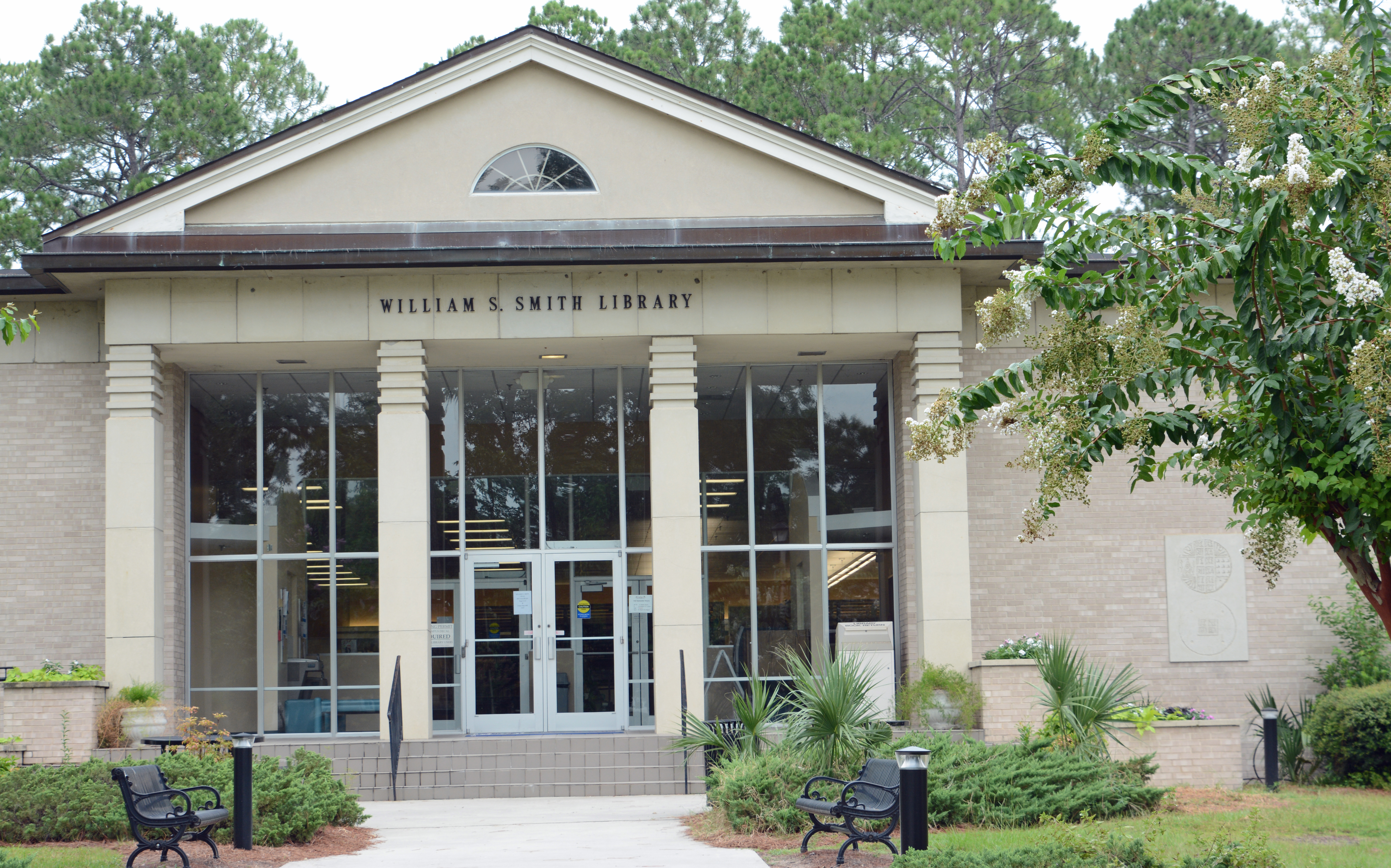
William S. Smith Library

Holdings in the South Georgia State College William S. Smith Library exceed 100,000 items, including reference books, bound periodicals, government documents, pamphlets, maps and videotapes. The library subscribes to 327 journals and ten newspapers. Back issues are available in a variety of formats: CD-ROM, paper, microfiche and microfilm. GALILEO (Georgia Library Learning Online, a statewide initiative) links SGSC's library with others in Georgia to offer more than 100 generalized and specialized research databases. The reference area also offers CD-ROM based indexes to general periodicals and newspapers. Computer workstations offer access to the Internet through the campus network. Word-processing software is also available.

=== Wellness Center Complex ===
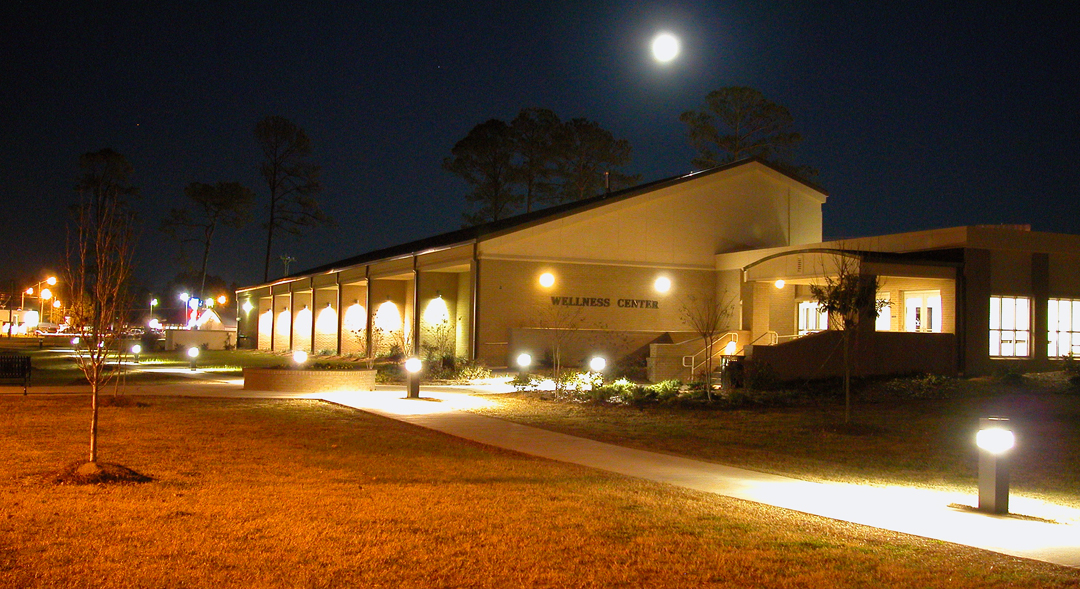
SGSC's Wellness Center at night

The Wellness Center Complex features racquetball courts, a free-weight area, an aquatic center, exercise rooms, aerobics, and a gymnasium containing a basketball/volleyball court. The aquatic center features an indoor swimming pool, locker rooms, outdoor patio, and classroom space.

== Organization and administration ==
South Georgia State College is accredited by the Commission on Colleges of the Southern Association of Colleges and Schools to award certificates and associate degrees. South Georgia State College is also certified under the National League for Nursing and the Georgia Board of Nursing.

== Athletics ==
South Georgia State College currently sponsors 9 NJCAA Division I teams: baseball, softball, men's and women's cross country, men's and women's swimming, men's basketball, and women's soccer. South Georgia State College is a member of the Georgia Collegiate Athletic Association and the National Junior College Athletic Association.
