= Mitchell Scoggins =

American politician

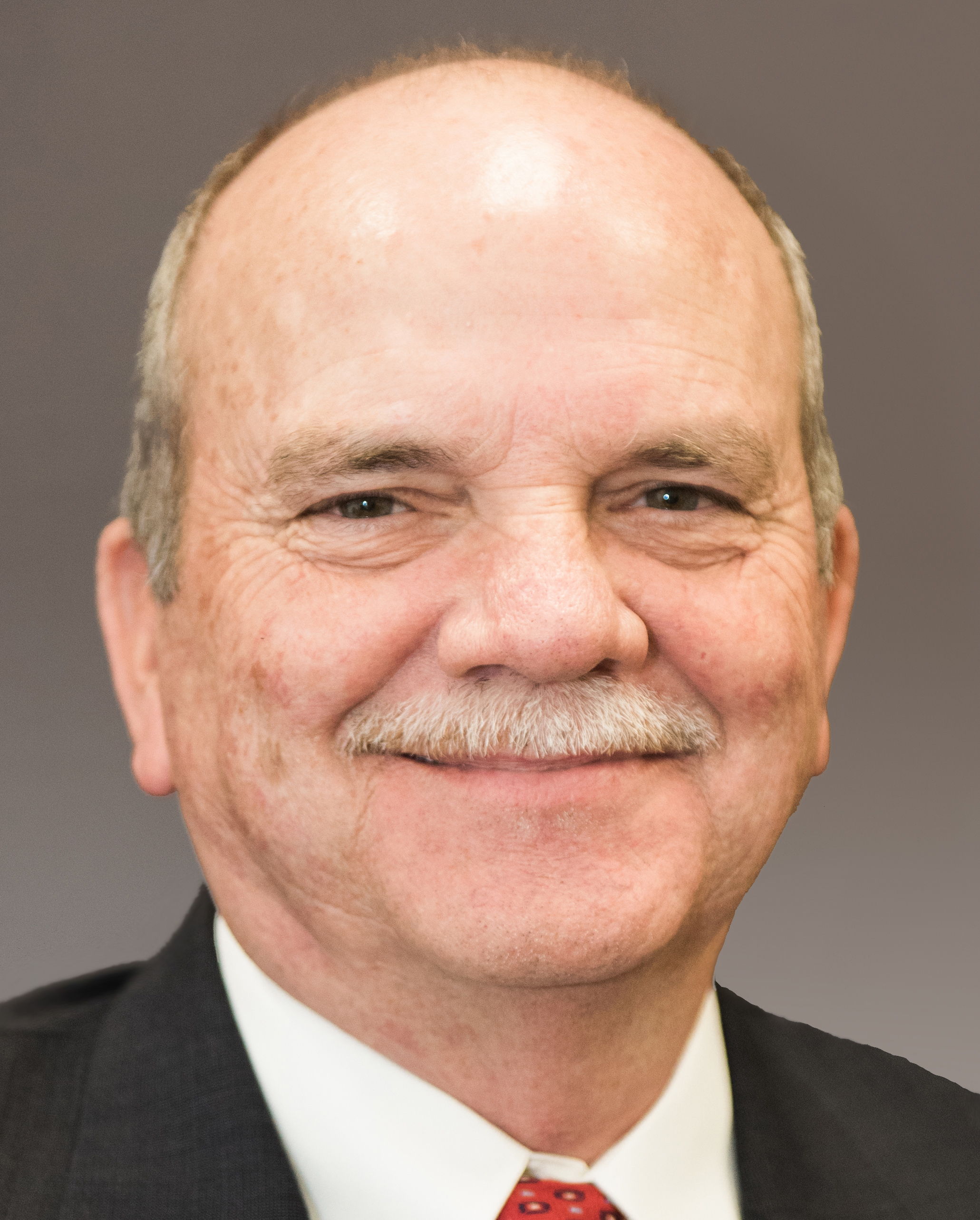

Member of the Georgia House of Representatives from the 14th district
- Incumbent
- Assumed office January 14, 2019
- Preceded by: Christian Coomer

Personal details
- Born: November 6, 1955 (age 70)
- Party: Republican

Mitchell Lee Scoggins (born November 6, 1955) is an American politician. He is a member of the Georgia House of Representatives from the 14th District.
