= Eleventh District A & M School–South Georgia College Historic District =

Historic district in Georgia, United States

- U.S. National Register of Historic Places
- U.S. Historic district
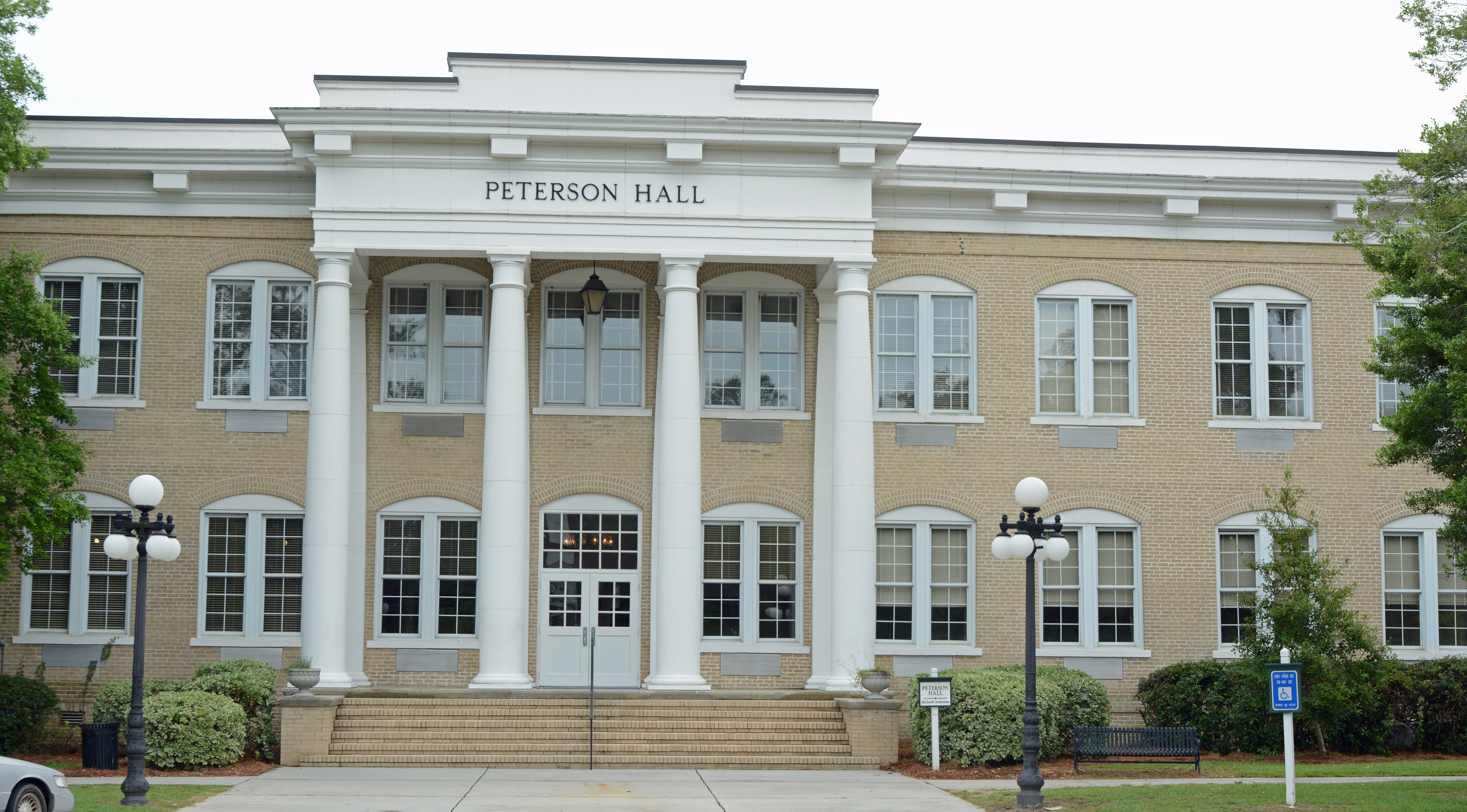
- Peterson Hall, one of the three original 1907 buildings

- Location within Georgia Location within the United States
- Location: Roughly bounded by College Park Dr., Brooks & Tiger Rds., Douglas, Georgia
- Area: 48 acres (19 ha)
- Built: 1906
- Architect: Haralson Bleckley, Abreu & Robeson
- Architectural style: Late 19th and 20th Century Revivals, International Style
- NRHP reference No.: 10000274
- Added to NRHP: May 21, 2010

The Eleventh District A & M School–South Georgia College Historic District is a part of South Georgia State College in Douglas, Georgia. Ten of its buildings are listed as contributing properties in a historic district listed on the National Register of Historic Places.

== History ==
The Eleventh District A & M School was one of the original eleven regional high schools created by the Georgia General Assembly in 1906, in a system which became the Georgia State Agricultural and Mechanical School System. The school evolved into a junior college - the first state-supported junior college in Georgia. It was named South Georgia State Junior College from 1927 to 1929, South Georgia State College from 1929 to 1936, South Georgia College from 1936 until sometime in the early 2010s, when it was named South Georgia State College again.

There are ten campus buildings built between 1907 and 1958 which are listed as contributing buildings. Three are Peterson Hall (originally the Academic Building), and original dormitories Davis Hall and Powell Hall. These all date from 1907 and were designed by the Atlanta architect Haralson Bleckley.

== Contributing buildings ==
- Peterson Hall (1907)
- Davis Hall (1907)
- Powell Hall (1907)
- College Dining Hall (now IT-Nursing Building) (1927)
- Golf Shack (ca. 1927)
- Clower Gymnasium (1936)
- Thrash Hall (library, 1939)
- Alumni House (originally the president's house) (1953)
- Tanner Hall (1956)
- Stubbs Hall (1958)
Campus buildings

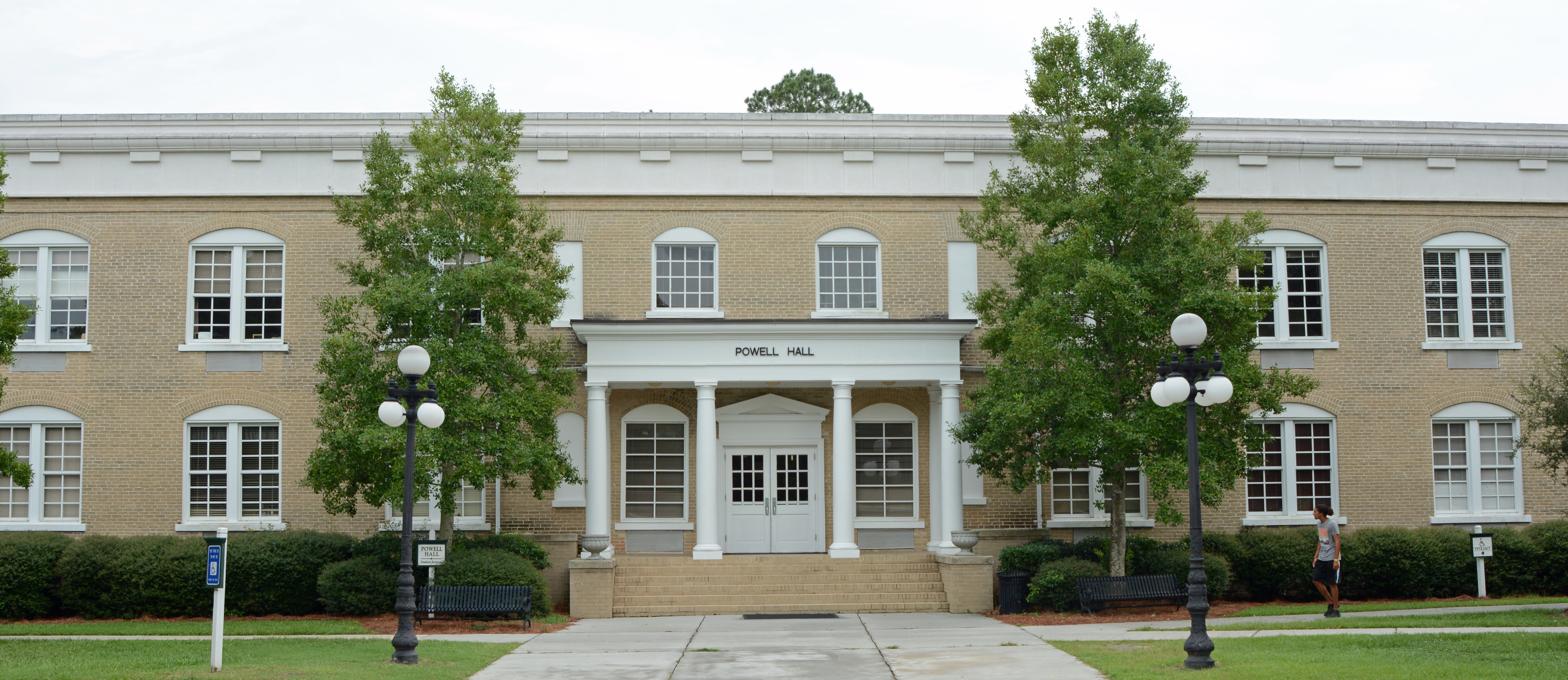
Powell Hall

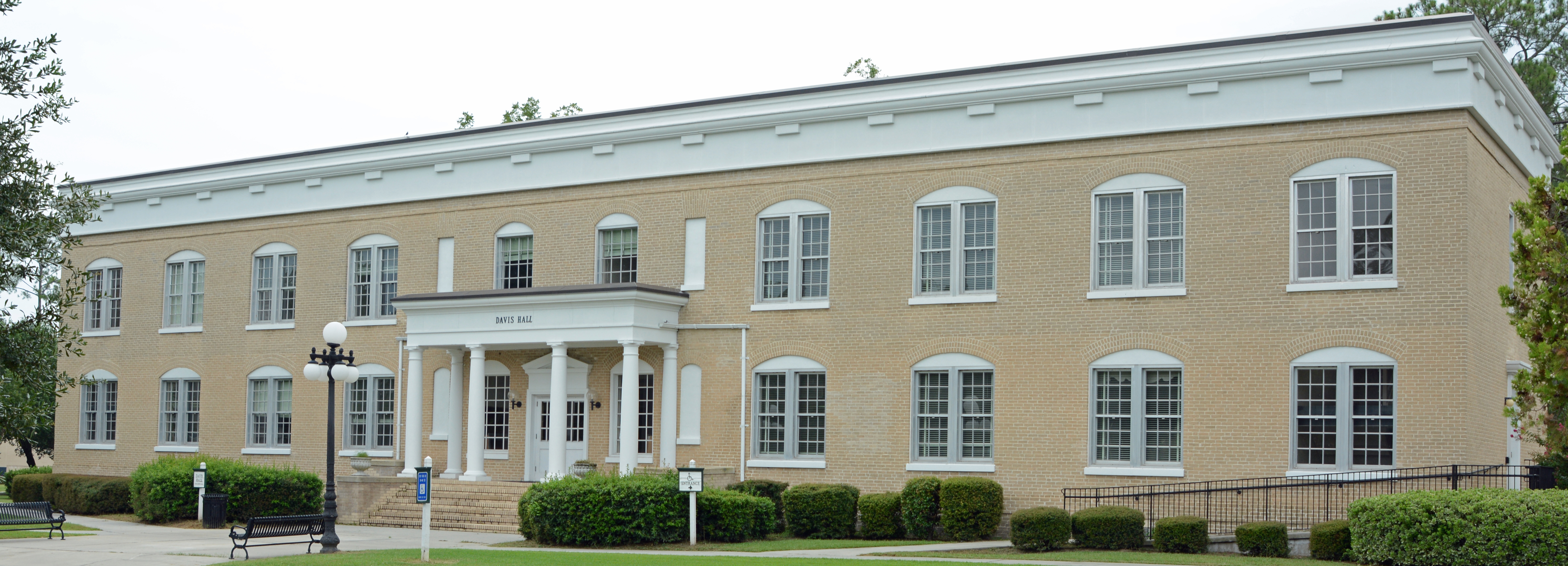
Davis Hall

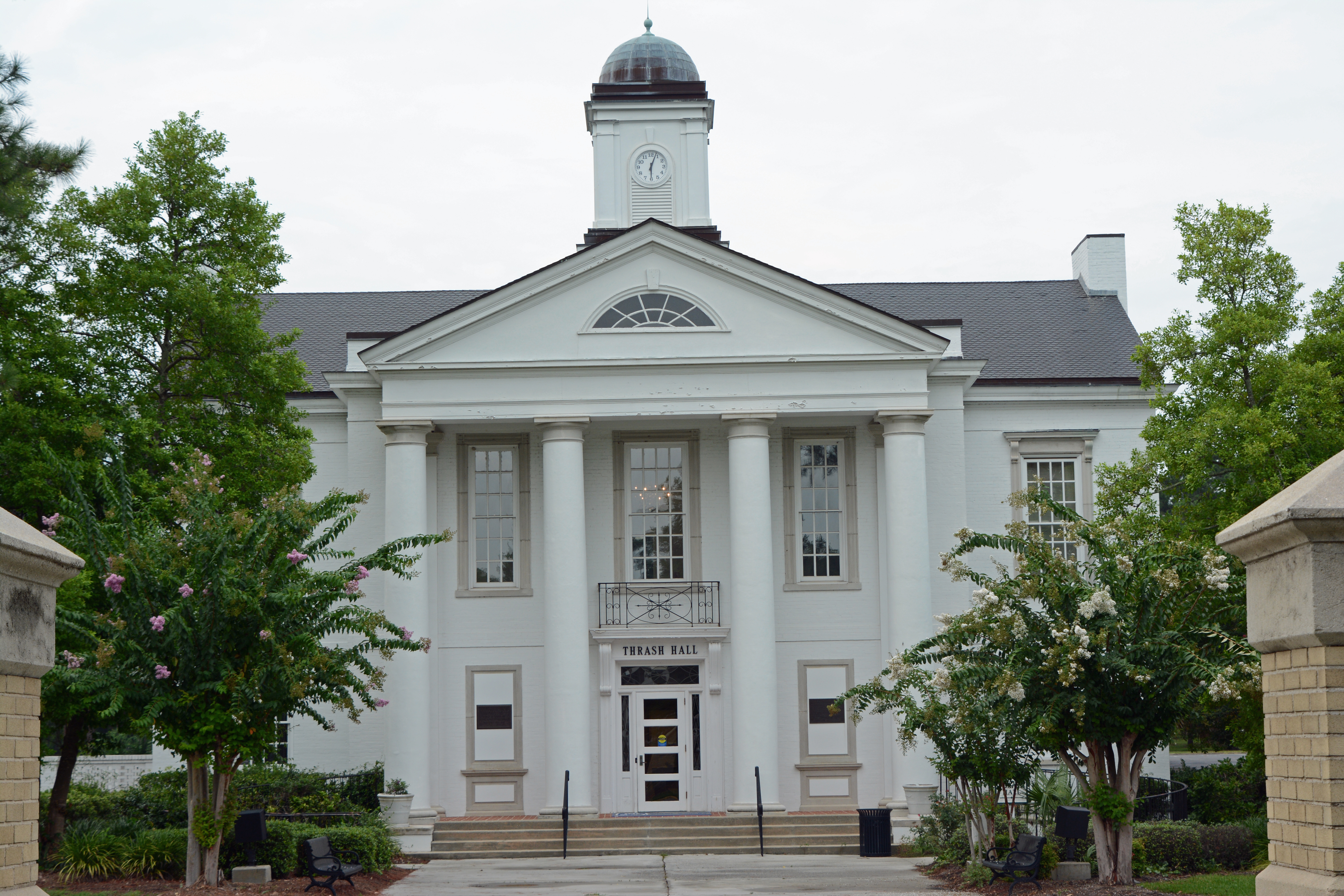
Thrash Hall

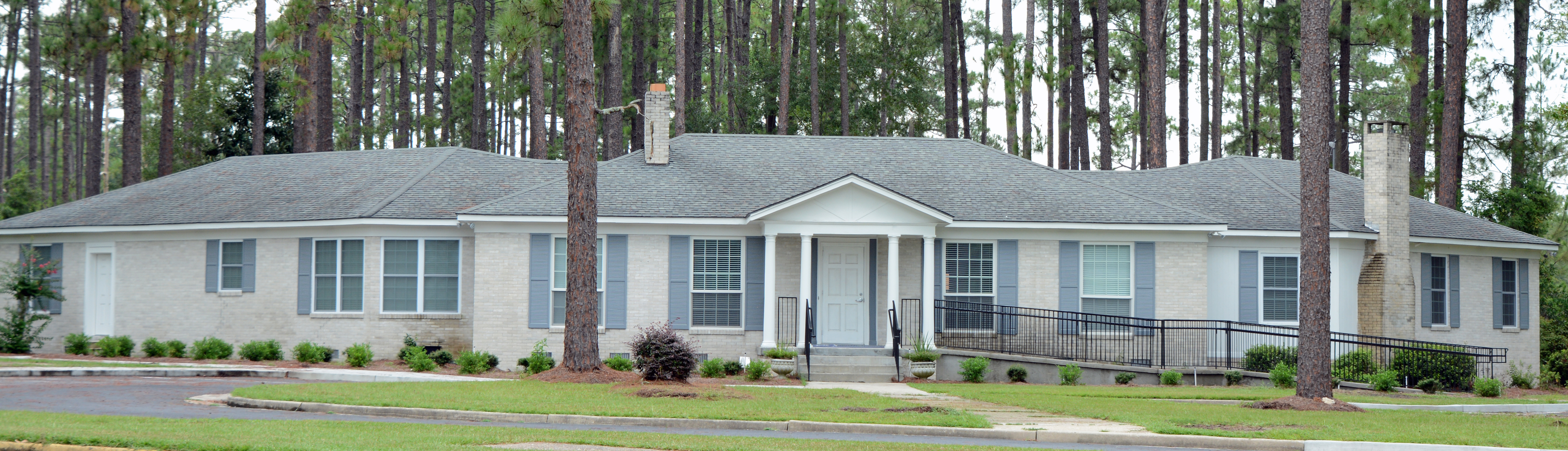
President's house (Alumni house)

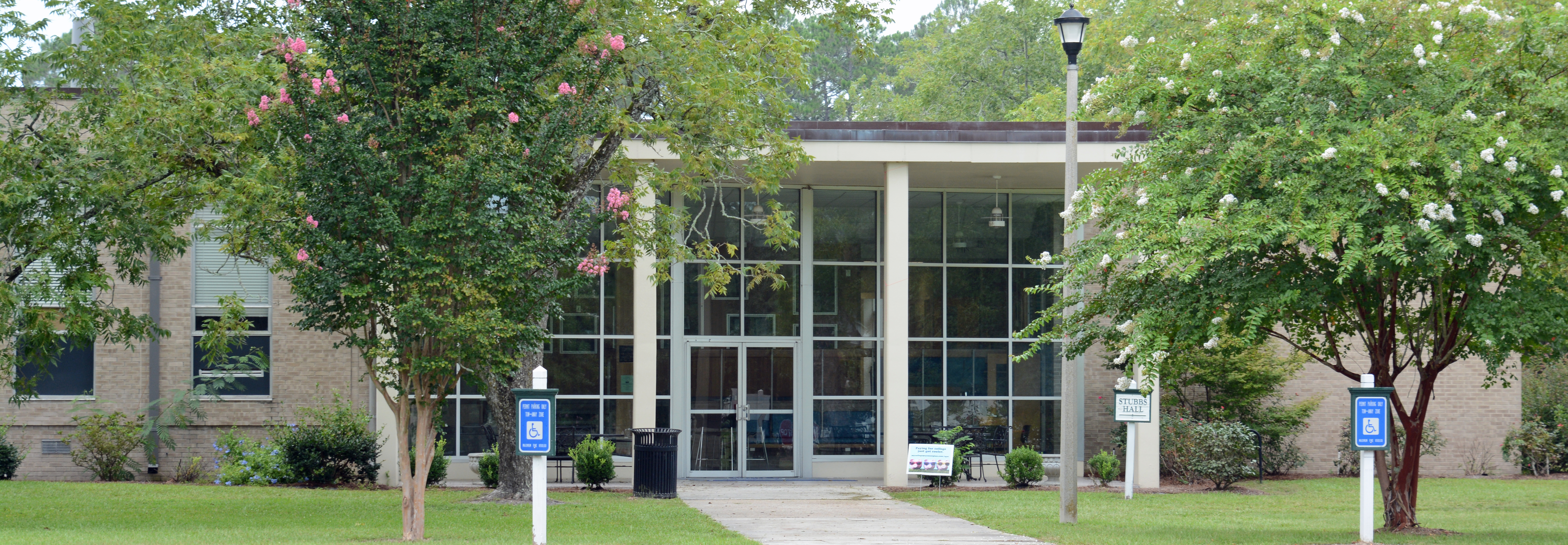
Stubbs Hall
