= Griffin City Hall =

- U.S. Historic district – Contributing property
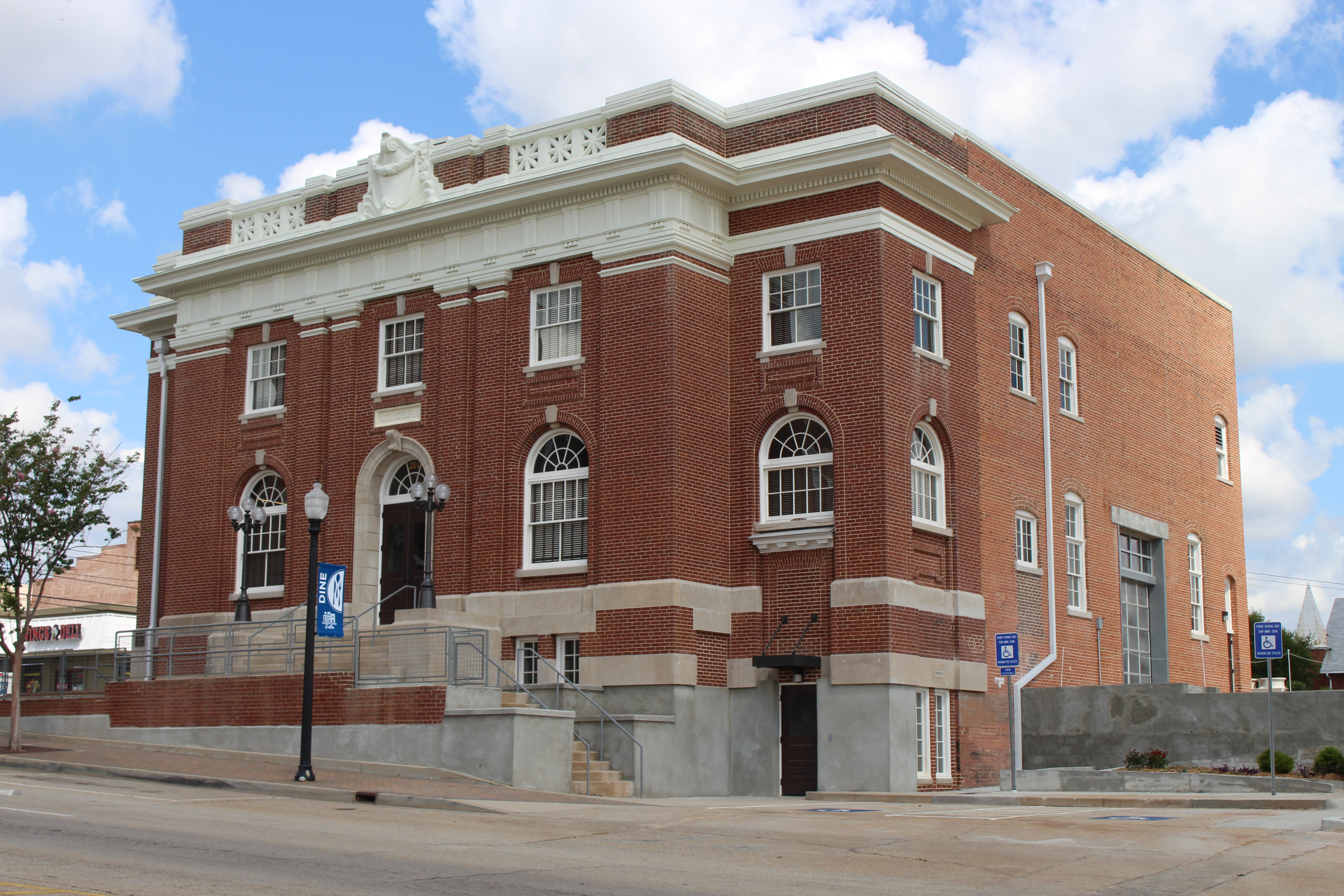
- Front view, 2019

- Location within Georgia Location within the United States
- Location: 201 E. Solomon St, Griffin, Georgia
- Coordinates: 33.248878°N 84.261895°W
- Built: 1910; 116 years ago
- Architect: Haralson Bleckley
- Architectural style: Colonial Revival
- Part of: Griffin Commercial Historic District (ID88002310)

The Griffin City Hall, in Griffin, Georgia, was built around 1910. It was designed by Atlanta architect Haralson Bleckley. It has become known as Old City Hall or Historic City Hall, and is located on the northeast corner of E. Solomon St. at N. 6th St. in Griffin.

It was built to serve as a city hall and fire station.

It was named one of Georgia's top 10 endangered buildings in 2014. It is a contributing building in the Griffin Commercial Historic District.

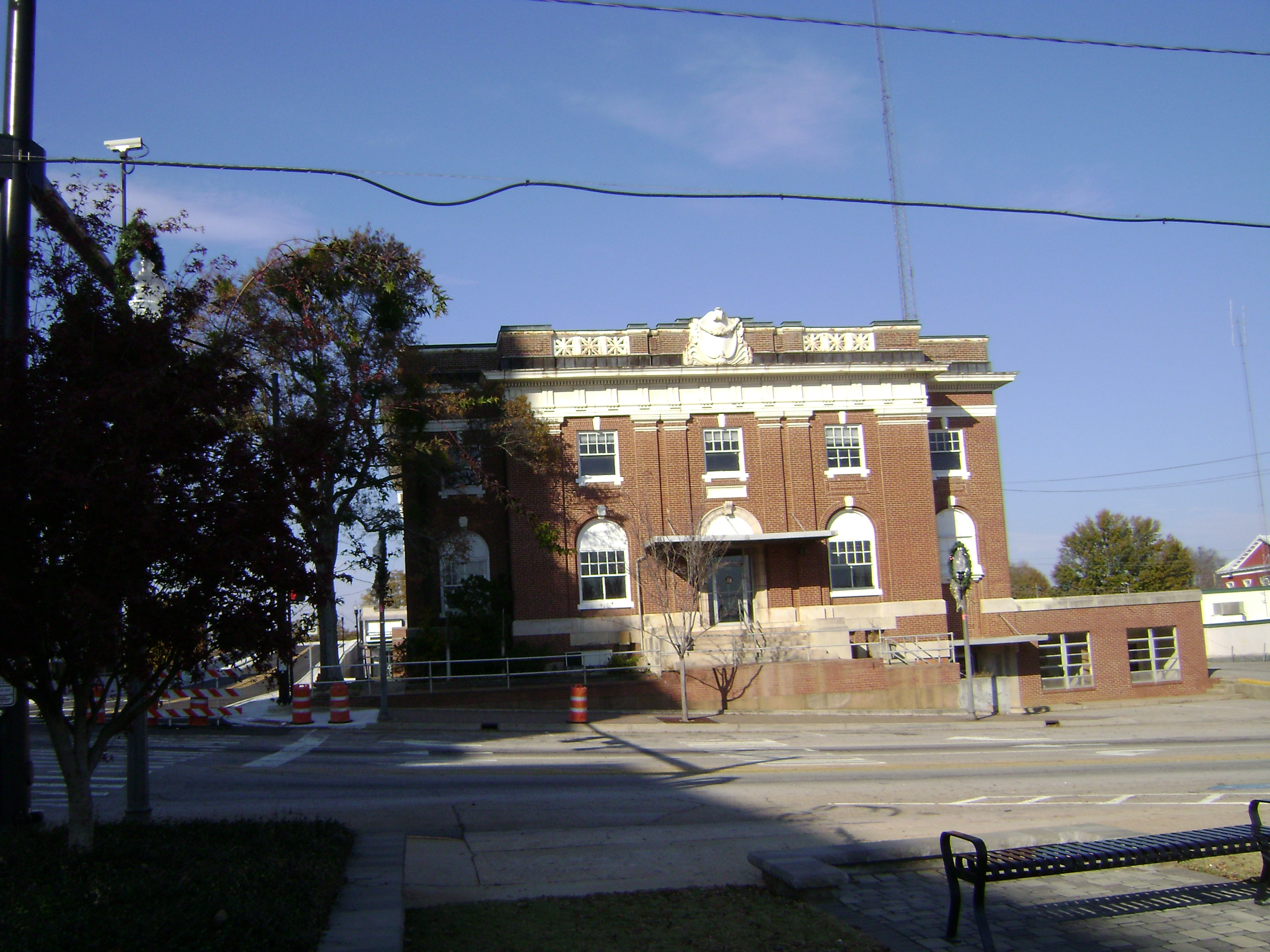
Building in 2012
