= Midtown Historic District (Atlanta) =

Historic district in Georgia, United States

- U.S. National Register of Historic Places
- U.S. Historic district
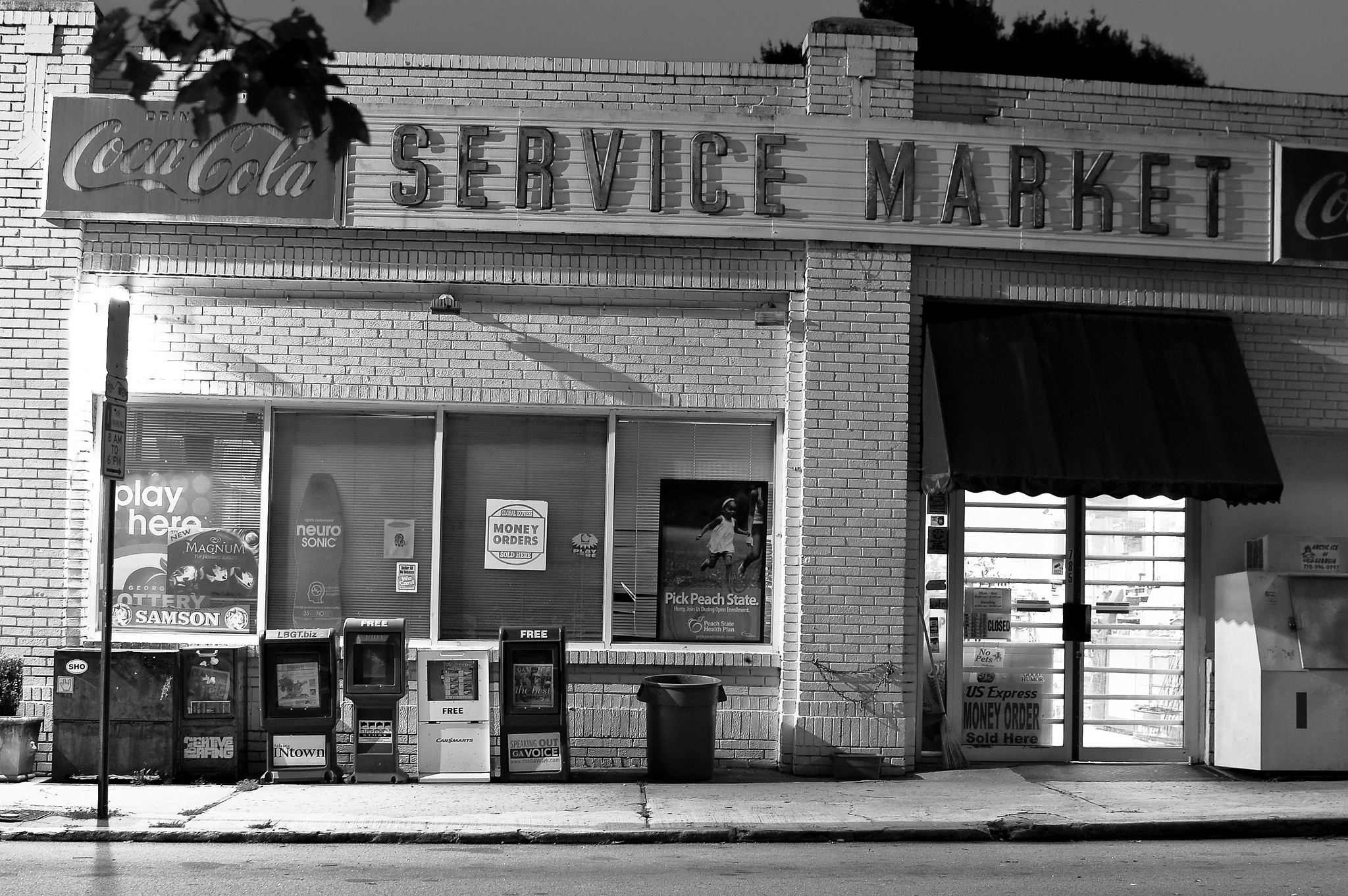
- A market in the historic district

- Location within Atlanta
- Location: Roughly bounded by 10th St., Ponce de Leon Ave., Piedmont Ave., and Lakeview Ave., Atlanta, Georgia
- Coordinates: 33°46′40″N 84°22′28″W
- Area: 360 acres (1.5 km^{2})
- Built: 1885
- Architect: Haralson Bleckley; W.A. Brightwell and Sons, et al.
- Architectural style: Queen Anne, Bungalow/Craftsman, multiple
- NRHP reference No.: 99000161
- Added to NRHP: February 12, 1999

The Midtown Historic District in Midtown Atlanta, Georgia is a historic district that was listed on the National Register of Historic Places in 1999. It is roughly contiguous with what the Midtown Alliance organization calls the "Midtown Neighborhood", which is only part of the much larger Midtown neighborhood. The Midtown Local Historic District organization seeks to designate most of the current historic district as a "local historic district", which unlike simply being listed on the National Register, provides tools for preservation of the historic architecture.

The listing included 722 contributing buildings and a contributing structure on 360 acres (1.5 km^{2}). It also included 168 non-contributing buildings and 47 non-contributing sites.

It includes works by Haralson Bleckley, W.A. Brightwell & Sons, Mitchell & Conklin, Lewis E. Crook, Willis F. Denny, Walter T. Downing, C.E. Frazier, Bruce and Morgan, Gottfried Norrman, Benjamin R. Padgett, Emil Seiz, Hentz, Adler & Shutze, Bleckley & Tyler, Harry L.Walker, and Lelia Ross Wilburn.
