= Stanford Journal of International Law =

- Discipline: International law
- Language: English
- Edited by: Chenxi Wang, Zachary Marcone

Publication details
- Former name: Stanford Journal of International Studies
- History: 1966-present
- Publisher: Stanford Law School (United States)
- Frequency: Biannual
- Impact factor: 1.0 (2022)

Standard abbreviations
- Bluebook: Stan. J. Int'l L.
- ISO 4: Stanf. J. Int. Law

Indexing
- ISSN: 0731-5082 (print); 2164-8301 (web)
- LCCN: 82641108
- OCLC no.: 971093974

Links
- Journal homepage; Online archive at HeinOnline

The Stanford Journal of International Law is a biannual student-run law journal covering international law, including public international law, comparative law, human rights, international relations, and international trade. It also publishes shorter academic notes on policy issues of international character, recent developments in international law, and book reviews. It is published by the Stanford Law School and was established in 1966. The journal also hosts keynote speakers and annual symposia.

The staff consists of an executive board and over a dozen member editors who assist with preparation of the material that is published in each issue.

Complete archives are available via LexisNexis, WestlawEdge, ProQuest, and HeinOnline.

== Abstracting and indexing ==
The journal is abstracted and indexed in: Current Contents/Social & Behavioral Sciences, EBSCO databases, ProQuest databases, Scopus, and the Social Sciences Citation Index. According to the Journal Citation Reports, the journal has a 2022 impact factor of 1.0.
