= Waycross College =

Former college in Georgia, U.S.

Coordinates: 31.20590°N 82.38847°W

- Type: Two-year college
- Active: 1976–2013
- President: Dr. Mary Ellen Wilson, Interim President
- Administrative staff: 74
- Undergraduates: 989
- Location: Waycross, Georgia, USA
- Campus: 150 acres (.607 km^{2})
- Colors: Burgundy and Gray
- Mascot: Swamp Fox
- Website: www.waycross.edu
- Consolidated into South Georgia State College on January 8, 2013

Waycross College was a two-year unit of the University System of Georgia. The college's philosophy was to provide opportunities for those who need special preparation for regular college-level courses while giving well-prepared students immediate access to transfer courses that can be applied toward advanced study appropriate to their academic goals.

The Board of Regents of the University System approved the establishment of a two-year college in the Ware County-Waycross area in December 1970. A site for the college was approved by the Board in February 1973. A bond issue was approved in May 1973. An official name, Waycross Junior College, was approved by the Board of Regents in January 1975. Waycross Junior College opened for classes in September 1976. In June 1987, the official name was changed to Waycross College.

In January 2012, the Board of Regents of the University System of Georgia approved the merger of the school with South Georgia College. The two institutions were consolidated into a new institution named South Georgia State College in January 2013.

Waycross College was accredited by the Commission on Colleges of the Southern Association of Colleges and Schools to award associate degrees

== Campus photos ==
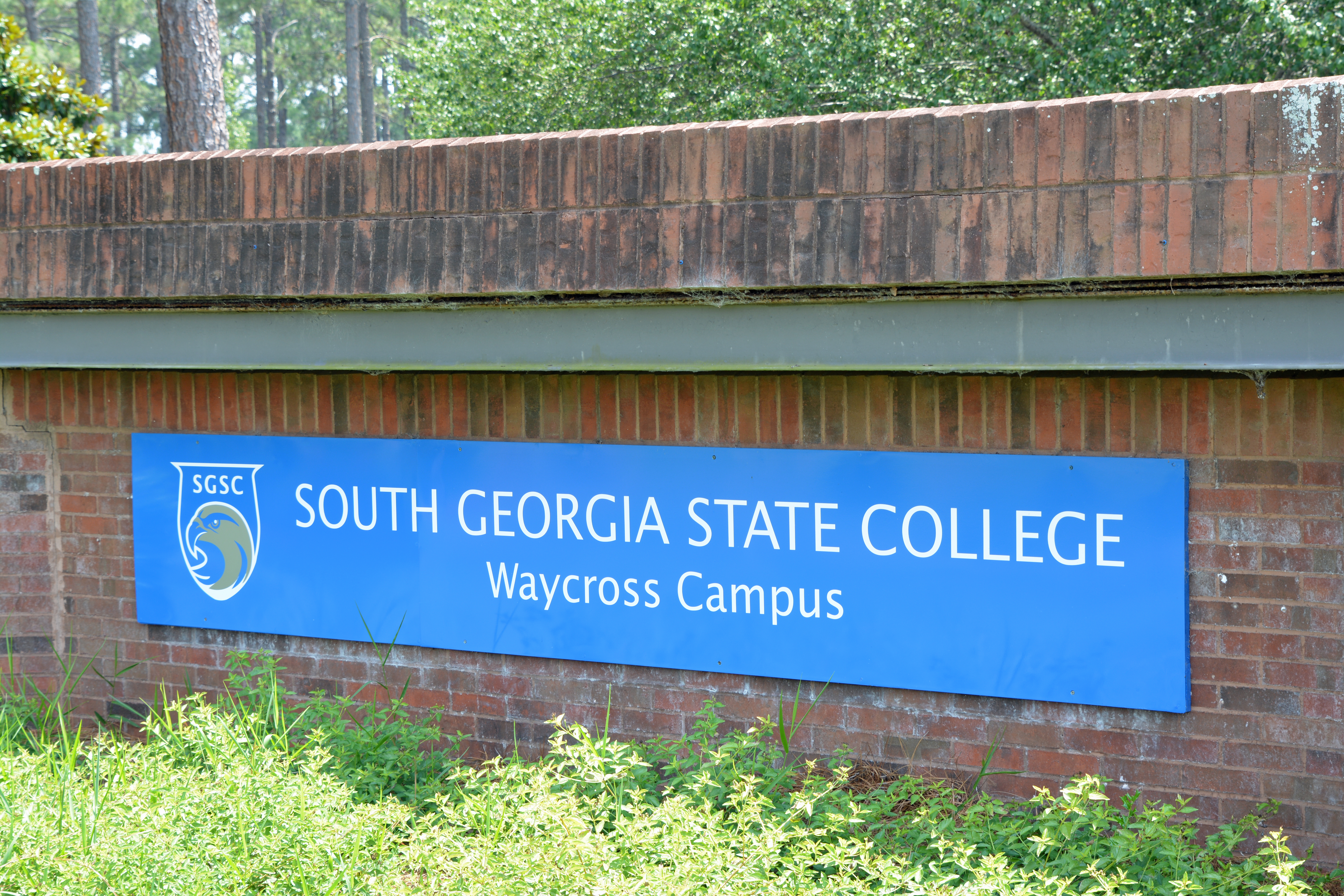
sign

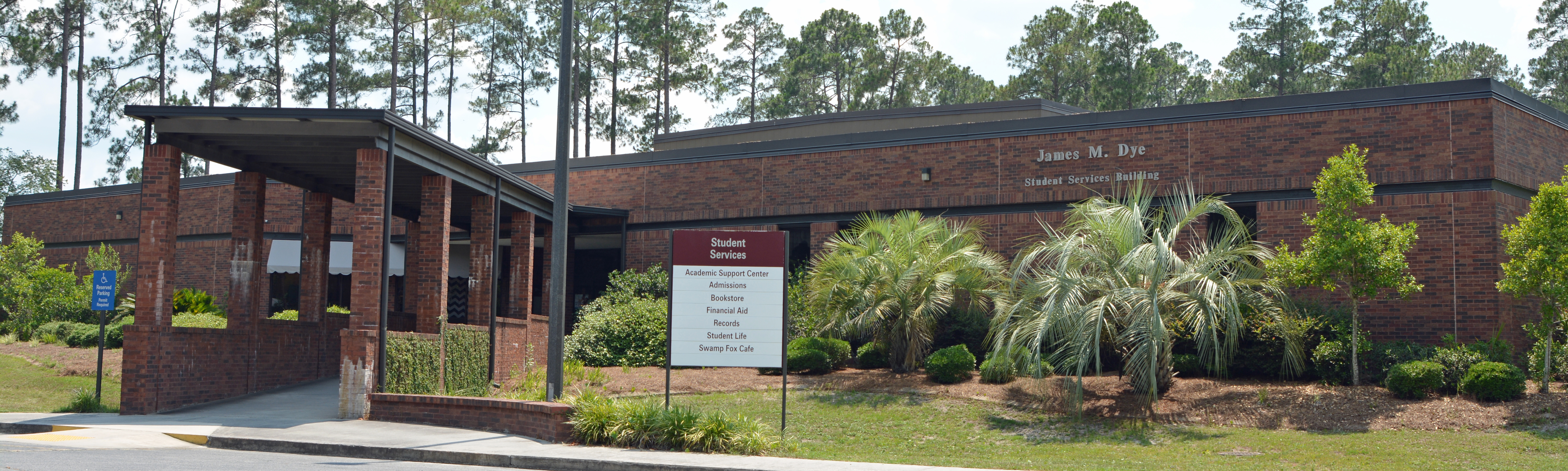
James M. Dye Student Services Building

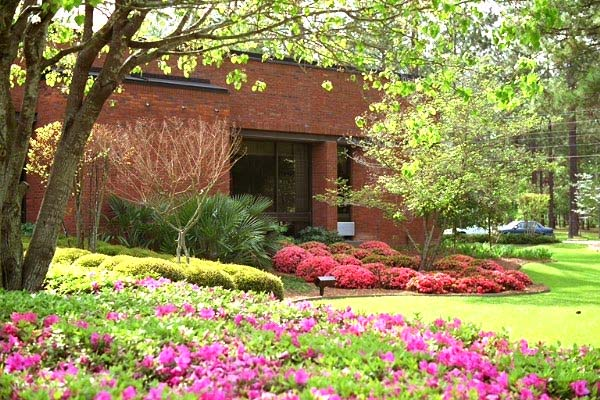
The Administration Building
