= Ashleigh Merchant =

American criminal defense attorney

- Education: University of Florida (BA); University of Florida Levin College of Law (JD)
- Occupation: Criminal defense attorney
- Organization: Merchant Law Firm, P.C
- Spouse: John Merchant
- Children: 2

Ashleigh B. Merchant is an American criminal defense attorney based in Georgia. She has represented clients in a number of high-profile cases, including the Young Thug YSL RICO trial, and is known for leading the effort to disqualify Fulton County District Attorney Fani Willis from the Georgia election racketeering prosecution against President Donald Trump and several co-defendants.

== Early life and education ==
Merchant is originally from Clearwater, Florida. She earned a bachelor's degree in political science from the University of Florida and a juris doctor (JD) from the University of Florida Levin College of Law in 2003. While in law school, she competed in moot court and won the Herbert Weschler National Criminal Law Moot Court Competition in Buffalo, New York. Merchant also clerked for a criminal defense attorney, gaining experience in high‑stakes cases, including a capital murder matter she successfully argued before the U.S. Supreme Court — a case which set precedent regarding defendants’ rights to reverse convictions based on inadequate trial representation.

== Legal career ==
After graduating, Merchant began her legal career at the Southern Center for Human Rights in Atlanta, Georgia, where she focused on death penalty defense and prisoners’ rights litigation. There, she represented death‑row inmates in state and federal habeas cases and litigated for improved prison conditions.

Merchant then served as a public defender with the Fulton County Public Defender’s Office, handling cases in both the complex trial and appellate divisions, including serious felony matters such as murder, vehicular homicide, and armed robbery.

Merchant and her husband, John Merchant, later established a private practice, The Merchant Law Firm, P.C., in Marietta, Georgia, where she continues to represent clients in criminal defense and civil rights matters. She was elected president of the Georgia Association of Criminal Defense Lawyers in 2024 and is a member of the Cobb County Bar Association. Merchant was recognized in the 2014 Georgia Super Lawyers Rising Stars edition, an honor given to only 2.5% of attorneys in the state. She is admitted to practice in all state courts in Georgia.

== Notable cases ==
=== Georgia election racketeering prosecution involving Donald Trump ===
In January 2024, Merchant, representing Donald Trump co-defendant Mike Roman, filed a motion to disqualify District Attorney Fani Willis from overseeing the Georgia election interference case. She alleged that Willis’s romantic relationship with special prosecutor Nathan Wade created a conflict of interest.

The motion and subsequent hearings received national attention. Judge Scott McAfee ultimately ruled that Willis could remain on the case if Wade stepped down, while criticizing her judgment and acknowledging the appearance of a conflict. Merchant’s role in the proceedings was widely covered and raised her national profile.

In December 2024, the Georgia Court of Appeals disqualified Willis from the case, citing the "appearance of impropriety" created by her relationship with Wade. The court’s ruling reversed the trial judge’s earlier decision, marking a significant legal victory for Trump and the co-defendants. Merchant, who had first raised the issue on behalf of Roman, told CBS News that Willis should not have been allowed to prosecute the case.

In March 2025, a separate court ordered Willis to pay more than $54,000 in attorney's fee to Merchant for violating Georgia's Open Records Act. The ruling found that Willis’ office had been “openly hostile” to Merchant’s document requests and had acted in “a lack of good faith.” The order required Willis to turn over all relevant records within 30 days, further strengthening Merchant’s position in her challenge to the prosecution.

=== Young Thug YSL RICO trial ===
Merchant also represented attorney Brian Steel, lead counsel for rapper Young Thug in his ongoing racketeering trial. In June 2024, she secured a Georgia Supreme Court ruling that stayed Steel’s 20-day contempt of court sentence imposed by Judge Ural Glanville. She argued that the order was improper and that Steel was performing his duties as defense counsel.

=== Defense of Ryan Alexander Duke in Tara Grinstead murder case ===
Merchant served as defense counsel for Ryan Alexander Duke, who was charged in the disappearance and death of Tara Grinstead, a high school teacher in Irwin County, Georgia, whose case remained unsolved for more than a decade. Duke was arrested in 2017 after confessing to investigators that he had killed Grinstead during a burglary, and led authorities to the location where her body was allegedly burned.

At trial in 2022, Merchant argued that Duke’s confession was coerced while he was under the influence of drugs and challenged the reliability of the evidence linking Duke to the crime. She contended that Duke did not harm Grinstead and urged the jury to reject the prosecution’s case.

In 2020, Merchant represented Duke in an appeal before the Supreme Court of Georgia (Case No. S20A1522), challenging the trial court’s denial of state funding for expert witnesses and investigative assistance. She argued that Georgia’s Indigent Defense Act required the state to provide such resources to indigent defendants even when represented by private or pro bono counsel, citing constitutional concerns of due process and equal protection.

In February 2025, the Georgia Court of Appeals dismissed several charges against Duke and co‑defendant Bo Dukes in Ben Hill County, ruling that the statute of limitations had expired. Merchant stated the ruling vindicated her defense argument that prosecutors had delayed prosecution too long. Duke had previously been acquitted of murder but convicted of concealing Grinstead’s death, a conviction he continues to appeal.

== Personal life ==
Merchant lives in Marietta, Georgia, with her husband and law partner, John, and their two daughters.
