= Charlie Bethel =

American judge (born 1976)

Associate Justice of the Supreme Court of Georgia
- Incumbent
- Assumed office October 2, 2018
- Appointed by: Nathan Deal
- Preceded by: Harris Hines

Judge of the Georgia Court of Appeals
- In office January 1, 2017 – October 2, 2018
- Appointed by: Nathan Deal
- Preceded by: Michael P. Boggs
- Succeeded by: Christian A. Coomer

Member of the Georgia State Senate from the 54th district
- In office January 10, 2011 – December 31, 2016
- Preceded by: Don Thomas
- Succeeded by: Chuck Payne

Personal details
- Born: Charles Jones Bethel; March 3, 1976 (age 50) Athens, Georgia, U.S.
- Party: Republican
- Education: University of Georgia (BBA, JD)

Charles Jones "Charlie" Bethel (born March 3, 1976) is an associate justice of the Supreme Court of Georgia. He is a former Judge of the Georgia Court of Appeals. Before his judicial tenure, he served as Senator in the Georgia General Assembly from Dalton, Georgia. Bethel was first elected Senator in the 2010 general election and served Georgia's 54th district—a constituency which includes Murray and Whitfield counties, and portions of Gordon and Pickens counties as well.

== Early life and education ==
Charlie Bethel graduated cum laude in 1998 from the University of Georgia's Terry College of Business with a Bachelor of Business Administration in business management. He stayed with the University of Georgia, graduating with a Juris Doctor from the University of Georgia School of Law in 2001. Bethel was admitted to the State Bar of Georgia in 2001 and practiced law from 2003 to 2005. He is admitted to practice law in all of Georgia's state courts, the United States District Court for the Northern District of Georgia, and the Supreme Court of the United States. Bethel was an assistant solicitor for the city of Dalton from 2003 to 2004.

== Political career ==
Bethel was elected to the Georgia Senate in 2010 as a Republican and sworn in the following year. Bethel was a three-term Senator and sat on the Senate Government Oversight, Insurance and Labor, Judiciary, Judiciary Non-Civil, and Reapportionment and Redistricting committees.

== Judicial career ==
=== Georgia Court of Appeals ===
On November 9, 2016, the day after being elected to his fourth Senate term, Bethel was appointed to be a Judge of the Georgia Court of Appeals by Governor Nathan Deal. He assumed the seat of Michael P. Boggs who was appointed to the Supreme Court of Georgia. He took the bench on January 1, 2017, for a term that would have ended on December 31, 2018.

=== Georgia Supreme Court ===
On September 14, 2018, Governor Deal appointed Bethel to the Supreme Court of Georgia to fill the seat vacated by the retirement of Harris Hines. He was sworn into office on October 2, 2018.

Legal offices
Preceded by Harris Hines	Associate Justice of the Georgia Supreme Court; 2018–present	Incumbent
