= Harold Melton =

American judge

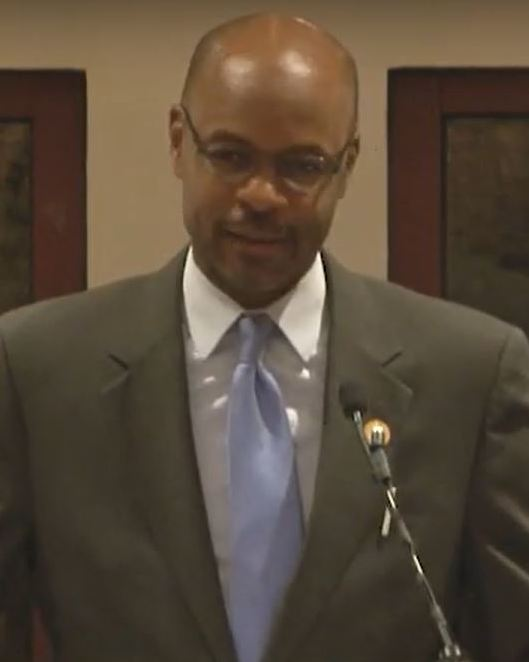
- Melton in 2019

Chief Justice of the Georgia Supreme Court
- In office September 4, 2018 – July 1, 2021
- Preceded by: Harris Hines
- Succeeded by: David Nahmias

Associate Justice of the Georgia Supreme Court
- In office July 1, 2005 – July 1, 2021
- Appointed by: Sonny Perdue
- Preceded by: Norman S. Fletcher
- Succeeded by: Verda Colvin

Personal details
- Born: Harold David Melton; September 25, 1966 (age 60) Washington, D.C., U.S.
- Party: Republican
- Spouse: Kimberly D. Melton
- Children: 3
- Education: Auburn University (BA); University of Georgia (JD)

Harold David Melton (born September 25, 1966) is a former chief justice of the Supreme Court of Georgia.

== Early years and education ==
A 1984 graduate of Joseph Wheeler High School in Marietta, Georgia, Melton received a Bachelor of Science from Auburn University, where he served as Student Government Association President, and his Juris Doctor from the University of Georgia School of Law in 1991. From 1991 to 2002, he served as a Volunteer Leader of Young Life Ministries and is currently a board member of Atlanta Youth Academy and the Director of Teen Ministry at Southwest Christian Fellowship Church.

At Auburn University, Melton served as the Student Government Association president for the 1987–88 academic year. He was the first African-American student elected to that position in Auburn history. He was also the first "independent" (non-fraternity member) elected to that position. The Melton Student Center, at Auburn University, is named for Justice Melton.

== Political and legal background ==
Prior to joining the Court, Melton served as Executive Counsel to Governor Perdue. Before serving as Executive Counsel, Melton spent 11 years as Assistant Attorney General in the Georgia Department of Law.

== Service on the Georgia Supreme Court and after ==
Melton was first appointed to the Court by Governor Sonny Perdue on July 1, 2005, to fill a vacancy on the bench created by the retirement of Justice Norman S. Fletcher. His appointment marked the first time a Republican governor had made an appointment to the Supreme Court since 1868 when Governor Rufus B. Bullock selected Justices Joseph E. Brown and H. K. McCay. He was sworn in as chief justice on September 4, 2018, by former chief justice Harris Hines. On February 12, 2021, Melton announced his intent to retire effective July 1, 2021.

He accepted a partnership in Troutman Pepper effective July 19, 2021. In October 2021, Melton was appointed to the Carl E. Sanders Chair in Political Leadership at the University of Georgia School of Law.

In July 2022, Melton became the first expert-in-residence for the Georgia State University College of Law

Legal offices
Preceded by Norman S. Fletcher	Associate Justice of the Georgia Supreme Court; 2005–2021	Succeeded by Verda Colvin
Preceded by Harris Hines	Chief Justice of the Georgia Supreme Court; 2018–2021	Succeeded by David Nahmias
