= Georgia Law Review =

- Discipline: Law
- Language: English
- Edited by: Dayle Lauren McCallar

Publication details
- History: 1966–present
- Publisher: University of Georgia School of Law
- Frequency: quarterly

Standard abbreviations
- Bluebook: Ga. L. Rev.
- ISO 4: Ga. Law Rev.

Indexing
- ISSN: 0016-8300

Links
- Journal homepage; Twitter @GaLRev

The Georgia Law Review is the flagship publication of the University of Georgia School of Law. It was established in 1966 and is run by second- and third-year law students, operating independently from the School of Law faculty and administration.

== History ==
Efforts to start a student-run law review at the University of Georgia go back to at least 1948 when two proposals were submitted but rejected by law school Dean J. Alton Hosch largely on financial grounds. Dean Hosch was dismissive of similar efforts in 1960 and 1963 citing his belief that there were already too many law reviews. Following Hosch's retirement in 1964, a successful effort to organize a law review was undertaken and the first issue was published in the Fall of 1966.

== Notable people ==
- Sally Yates, partner in multinational Global 30 firm, former acting United States Attorney General, served as the executive editor.
- Andrew Pinson, Justice, state Supreme Court, was a law clerk to an associate justice of the Supreme Court of the United States, was a former state Solicitor General, served as executive articles editor.
