= National Federation of Democratic Women =

Women's wing in the U.S. Democratic Party

- Abbreviation: NFDW
- Formation: October 6, 1971; 54 years ago
- Founders: 27 women
- Founded at: Washington, D.C., United States
- Type: Women's wing
- Key people: Rilla Moran (first President)
- Parent organization: Democratic Party
- Affiliations: Democratic Party
- Website: www.nfdw.com

The National Federation of Democratic Women (NFDW) is the official organization of the Democratic Party focusing on women's issues. The NFDW was established in 1971 as a means of supporting women's voices within the Democratic Party of the United States. The NFDW hosts national and state-level conferences and activities. The NFDW is a recognized constituent group of the Democratic National Committee (DNC) and therefore has three seats on the DNC and the president of NFDW is part of the executive committee of the DNC.

The NFDW has 37 chapters around the country and looks to expand to every state and protectorate.

== History ==
The National Federation of Democratic Women was formed on October 6, 1971, when 27 women gathered at breakfast during the Democratic Women's Leadership Conference at the Capitol Hilton in Washington, D.C. Rilla Moran was elected temporary chair and the group set May 1972, Nashville, Tennessee, as the first annual meeting.

Rilla Moran (from Tennessee) was elected the first President of the Federation at the May 1972 meeting and served until 1977 when Jean Ohm of South Dakota was elected president. At this convention, the women of the Federation established the Founders Internship for a young woman between the ages of 18 and 25 to work at the Democratic National Committee.

During the period 1972–1977, the Federation gained recognition from the Democratic National Committee as the official women's organization and received a seat on the DNC Executive Committee and three seats on the DNC. Rilla Moran Woods, C. DeLores Tucker and Caroline Wilkins were instrumental in establishing this official recognition for NFDW through their work on the Charter Commission and the 1976 Democratic National Convention Committee.

== See also ==
- Women's political organizations in the United States
