= Haralson Bleckley =

American architect (1870–1933)

- Born: January 31, 1870; Atlanta, Georgia
- Died: December 5, 1933 (aged 63); Atlanta, Georgia
- Resting place: Oakland Cemetery
- Occupation: Architect
- Spouse: Ollie Evans
- Parent(s): Logan Edwin Bleckley; Caroline Haralson
- Relatives: John Brown Gordon (maternal uncle)

Haralson Bleckley (January 31, 1870 - December 5, 1933) was an American architect who designed many buildings in his hometown of Atlanta, Georgia. Several of his works are listed on the National Register of Historic Places (NRHP). His office was in the Flatiron Building. He also proposed the Bleckley Plaza Plan, a largescale architectural project that would have seen the creation of a large plaza in downtown Atlanta.

Bleckley designed the University of Georgia Library Building built in 1904. He also designed the Bona Allen Mansion, built in 1911–12 in Buford, Georgia: Other works include:

- Several works in Eleventh District A & M School-South Georgia College Historic District, Douglas, Georgia, NRHP-listed. Including:

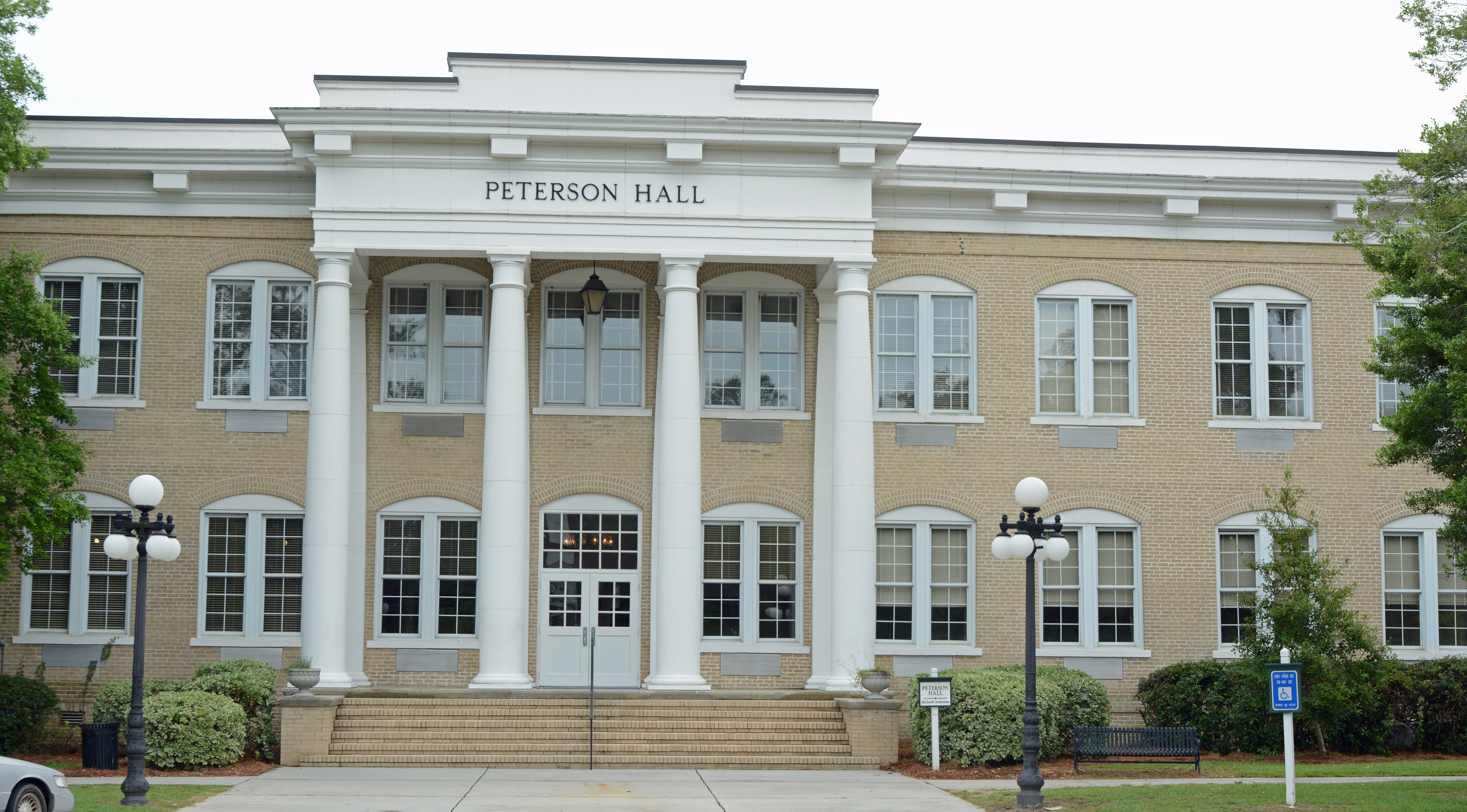
Peterson Hall

  - Peterson Hall (1907, originally the Academic Building)
  - Davis Hall (1907, a dormitory)
  - Powell Hall (1907, a dormitory)
- Baptist Church (1909), Ponce de Leon Avenue, Atlanta
- Fourth Ward School (1910) in Atlanta.
- Griffin Hotel (1910), included in Griffin Commercial Historic District, Griffin, GA (Bleckley, Haralson), NRHP-listed
- Griffin Hospital and Nurses' Home (c.1910), Griffin, Georgia
- Griffin City Hall
- One or more works in Third District A & M School-Georgia Southwestern College Historic District, 800 Wheatley St., Americus, GA (Bleckley, Haralson), NRHP-listed
- Tyree Building (1915–16), 679 Durant Pl., NE, Atlanta, GA (Bleckley, Haralson), NRHP-listed also included in the Midtown Historic District
