= Harris Hines =

American judge

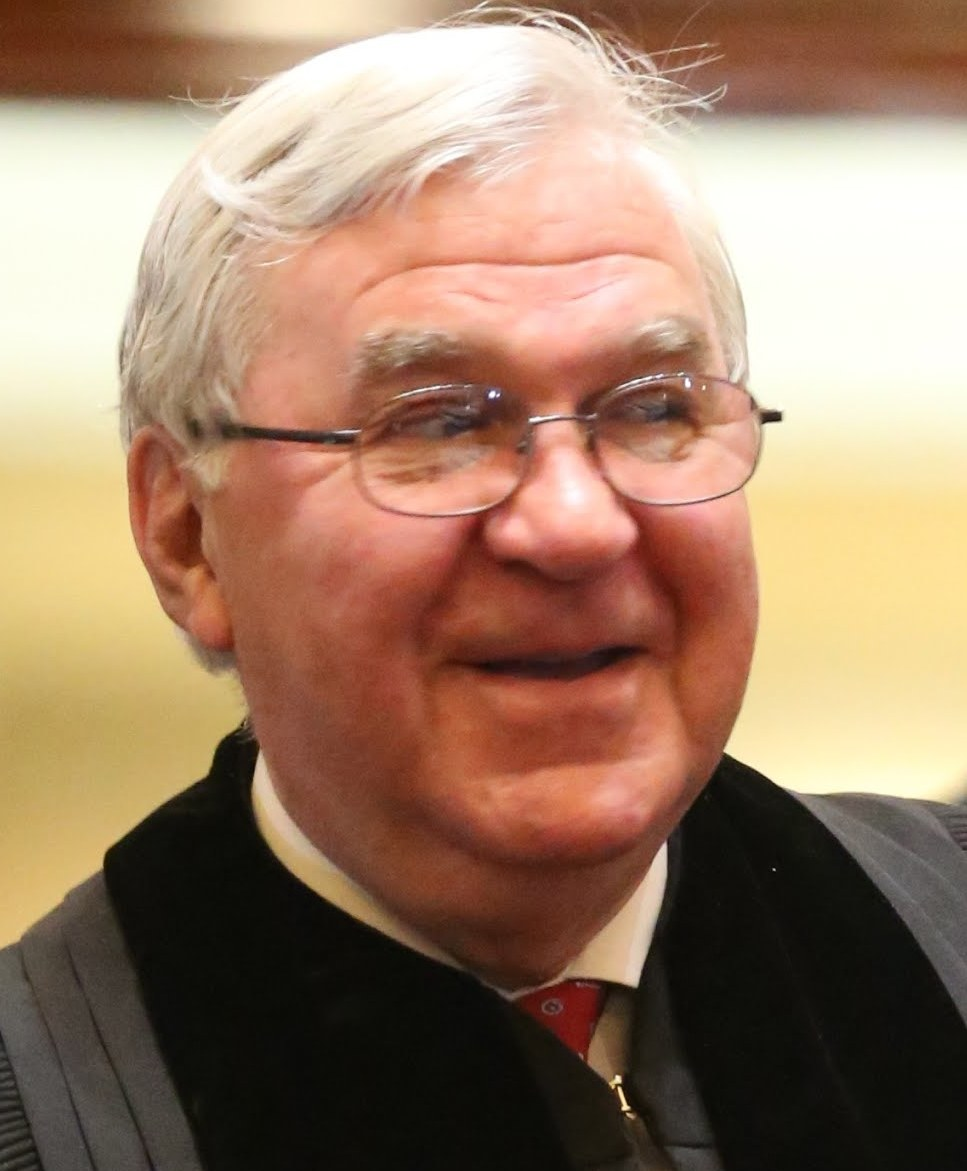
- Harris Hines, Chief Justice, Supreme Court, State of Georgia, US

Chief Justice of the Georgia Supreme Court
- In office January 6, 2017 – August 31, 2018
- Preceded by: Hugh P. Thompson
- Succeeded by: Harold Melton

Associate Justice of the Georgia Supreme Court
- In office July 26, 1995 – January 6, 2017

Personal details
- Born: September 6, 1943 Atlanta, Georgia, U.S.
- Died: November 4, 2018 (aged 75) Atlanta, Georgia, U.S.
- Education: Emory University (BA, JD)

Preston Harris Hines (September 6, 1943 – November 4, 2018) was the chief justice of the Georgia Supreme Court in the United States for a span which began in 2017 and ended in 2018.

== Early years and education ==
Preston Hines was born on September 6, 1943, in Atlanta, Georgia, to James and Edith Hawkins Hines and graduated from Henry W. Grady High School. Hines received his bachelor's from Emory University in 1965 and his J.D. degree from Emory University School of Law in 1968.

== Legal career ==
In 1969, after being admitted to the state bar, Hines moved to Cobb County where he worked for a Marietta law firm then named Edwards, Bentley, Awtrey & Parker. He practiced civil defense. The firm represented developers and lenders during a period when the Atlanta suburbs were undergoing rapid growth and economic expansion. The firm also represented the county and several city governments. Hines particularly liked handling business litigation. Looking back at that time, Hines recalled "I wasn’t one of those who always wanted to be a judge".

== Judicial career ==
In 1974, just five years out of law school, friends submitted Hines' name for an opening on the Cobb County State Court. After making the short-list, Hines drove to the state capitol to be interviewed by then-Gov. Jimmy Carter. Although Hines did not know Carter, or his family, they had friends and backgrounds in common. Hines' father and Carter were both from Sumter County. And "the Hines family farmed near the town of Leslie, not too far from the Carter home and peanut farm in Plains". Carter appointed Hines to the bench in May, 1974. It was a short-term appointment, since the post was coming up for election later that year. Hines had to run in the August primary and then the November general election. He won. Later, when Cobb County created a new position on the county Superior Court, Hines ran for that, and won.

On July 26, 1995, Hines was appointed to the Georgia Supreme Court by Governor Zell Miller. "I’m not going to say I knew the governor" said Hines "But if you’re going to be appointed, you better have somebody who knows something about the governor. I had friends who certainly knew the governor. He was a good guy." Hines was subsequently re-elected by the voters of the state.

Hines was elected Chief Justice by his colleagues in September 2016. He announced his intent to retire on August 31, 2018. On April 17, 2018, Harold Melton was elected as Hines' successor, and he was sworn in by Hines on September 4, 2018.

== Death and legacy ==
Hines died in a single-car accident on Interstate 85 in Atlanta, on November 4, 2018, just over two months after retiring from the bench. His funeral was attended by hundreds, including many prominent members of the Georgia legal community, judiciary, state and federal officials, as well as both the Governor and Governor-elect. He was 75.

Legal offices
Preceded by Hugh P. Thompson	Chief Justice of the Georgia Supreme Court; 2017–2018	Succeeded by Harold Melton
