= Sarah Hawkins Warren =

American judge (born 1981 or 1982)

Associate Justice of the Supreme Court of Georgia
- Incumbent
- Assumed office September 17, 2018
- Appointed by: Nathan Deal
- Preceded by: Britt Grant

Personal details
- Born: Sarah Mashburn Hawkins; 1981 or 1982 (age 43–44) Atlanta, Georgia, U.S.
- Spouse: Blaise Warren
- Children: 3
- Education: Duke University (BA, JD)

Sarah Hawkins Warren (born c. 1981 or 1982) is an American lawyer and judge serving as the presiding justice of the Supreme Court of Georgia since 2025. She was originally appointed to the Supreme Court as an associate justice by Georgia Governor Nathan Deal on August 22, 2018, to fill the vacancy created when Britt Grant was appointed to the United States Court of Appeals for the Eleventh Circuit. Warren was sworn in by Gov. Deal and assumed her seat on the court on September 17, 2018. She is on the Advisory Board of the Atlanta Lawyers Chapter of the Federalist Society.

== Early life and career ==
Warren graduated from The Westminster Schools, then received a bachelor's degree from Duke University and her Juris Doctor degree from Duke University School of Law. She served as a law clerk to Judge Richard J. Leon of the United States District Court for the District of Columbia and for Judge James Larry Edmondson of the U.S. Court of Appeals for the Eleventh Circuit.

She became a partner at the law firm Kirkland & Ellis, based in the Washington, D.C. office, where she represented the State of Georgia in Florida v. Georgia (2018), a United States Supreme Court original jurisdiction case that was part of the long-running dispute over the flow of river water among those two states and Alabama.

Warren and her husband, Blaise Warren, have three children and reside in Atlanta.

=== State solicitor general ===
Warren has also held several positions in Georgia's Office of the Attorney General. Immediately before her judicial appointment, Warren served as the state Solicitor General from January 2017, a position in which she also succeeded Britt Grant.

=== Supreme Court of Georgia ===
In the June 2020 election in Georgia, Warren faced opposition to her Court seat from Hal Moroz. She was one of two justices facing opposition on the Court. She retained her seat by a 79%-21% margin. In February 2025, she was elected to serve as the presiding justice of the court, for a term beginning April 1.

Legal offices
| Preceded by Britt Grant | Associate Justice of the Georgia Supreme Court; 2018–present | Incumbent |
