= Henry Lewis =

Henry Lewis may refer to:

== Arts and entertainment ==
- Henry Lewis (artist) (1819–1904), British-born American painter and showman
- Henry Clay Lewis (1825–1850), American short story writer and medical doctor
- Henry Jackson Lewis (c. 1857–1891), African-American political cartoonist
- Henry Lewis (musician) (1932–1996), American double-bassist and orchestral conductor
- Henry Lewis (playwright), English playwright in 2015 Laurence Olivier Awards and The Comedy About a Bank Robbery

== Military figures ==
- Henry Balding Lewis (1889–1966), U.S. Army officer
- Henry Lewis (Medal of Honor) (1844–1930), Medal of Honor recipient

== Politicians ==
- Henry Gould Lewis (1820–1891), Connecticut politician
- Henry Owen Lewis (1842–1913), Irish Member of Parliament for Carlow Borough, 1874–80
- Henry T. Lewis (1847–1903), justice of the Supreme Court of Georgia

== Sports figures ==
- Henry Lewis (American football) (active in 1921), American football player
- Henry Lewis (baseball) (fl. 1943), American baseball player
- Henry Lewis (footballer), Sierra Leonean footballer in 2012 Malaysia Premier League

== Others ==
- Henry Lewis (escaped slave), escaped from William Jarvis, a leading official in Upper Canada
- Henry Carvill Lewis (1853–1888), American geologist and mineralogist
- Henry Lewis (academic) (1889–1968), professor of Welsh
- Henry Lewis (surveyor) (1813–1889), discoverer of Lewis Pass in New Zealand
- Henry Ardern Lewis (1879–1957), Church of England minister and Cornish Bard
- Henry Roger Justin Lewis (born 1925), British lawyer in Fiji

== See also ==
- Harry Lewis (disambiguation)
- Hal Lewis (disambiguation)
