= Early Entrance Program =

Early Entrance Program may refer to:

- Transition School and Early Entrance Program, at the University of Washington
- Early Entrance Program (CSU), at the California State University
