= Hal Lewis =

Hal Lewis may refer to:

- Harold Lewis (1923–2011), physicist
- Hal Lewis (Aku) (died 1983), radio personality
- Hal Lewis (American football, born 1935), American football player for the Indianapolis Colts, Buffalo Bills and Oakland Raiders
- Hal Lewis (American football, born 1944), American football player for the Denver Broncos, see List of American Football League players
- Henry T. "Hal" Lewis (1847–1903), justice of the Supreme Court of Georgia

== See also ==
- Harry Lewis (disambiguation)
- Henry Lewis (disambiguation)
- Harold Lewis (disambiguation)
