= Harry Lewis =

Harry Lewis may refer to:

== Arts and entertainment ==
- Sinclair Lewis (Harry Sinclair Lewis, 1885–1951), American novelist and playwright
- Harry Lewis (musician) (1916–1998), English saxophonist and clarinetist
- Harry Lewis (actor) (1920–2013), American actor and restaurateur
- Harry Lewis (a.k.a. Wroetoshaw/W2S) (born 1996), British YouTuber, streamer, and member of the Sidemen

== Sports ==
- Harry Lewis (Australian footballer) (1880–1946), Australian rules footballer
- Harry Lewis (boxer) (1886–1956), American world champion welterweight boxer
- Harry Lewis (footballer, born 1896) (1896–?), English footballer
- Harry Lewis (footballer, born 1910) (1910–2006), Welsh footballer
- Harry Lewis (footballer, born 1997), English football goalkeeper
- Harry Lewis (footballer, born 2004), English footballer

== Others ==
- Harry E. Lewis (1880–1948), Jewish-American lawyer and judge from New York
- Harry S. Lewis (1861–1940), English Jewish author and communal worker
- Harry Lewis (politician) (born 1941), American politician
- Harry R. Lewis (born 1947), American computer scientist, author, and university administrator

== Other uses ==
- Sir Harry Lewis, American-bred Thoroughbred racehorse
- "The Ballad of Harry Lewis", a comedic song from the album My Son, the Folk Singer, by Alan Sherman

== See also ==
- Henry Lewis (disambiguation)
- Harold Lewis (disambiguation)
