= Early entrance to college =

Early entry to higher education

Early entrance to college, sometimes called early admission or early enrollment, is the practice of allowing students to be accelerated into college, one or more years before the traditional age of college entrance, and without obtaining a high school diploma. In some cases this is done individually. Often, however, it is done as part of a cohort acceleration program, in which many such students are accelerated into college together at the same time. These programs are usually targeted to gifted students, and may provide the students with a social support network and help in dealing with the adjustment.

By placing students into full-time college studies, early entrance differs from dual enrollment, early college high school, Advanced Placement, International Baccalaureate, and Advanced International Certificate of Education programs, which are alternative methods of earned college credits (or their equivalent) while in high school.

Early entrance programs take a number of forms. Some, like the Advanced Academy of Georgia and The Clarkson School, are special programs within larger colleges. The University of Washington's Transition School and Early Entrance Program, started in 1977, allows a small group of academically advanced students each year to, instead of attending high school, they attend a one-year college preparatory program following enrollment as matriculated freshmen at the university. In other programs, like the early entrance program at Shimer College, the Program for the Exceptionally Gifted at Mary Baldwin University, and the Early Entrance Program at CSULA, early entrants study side-by-side with traditional college students. Bard College at Simon's Rock is the only four-year college designed exclusively for younger students. Also, some colleges do allow some younger people who have early enrollment to take classes and be a part of the college community.

== History ==
=== Context ===
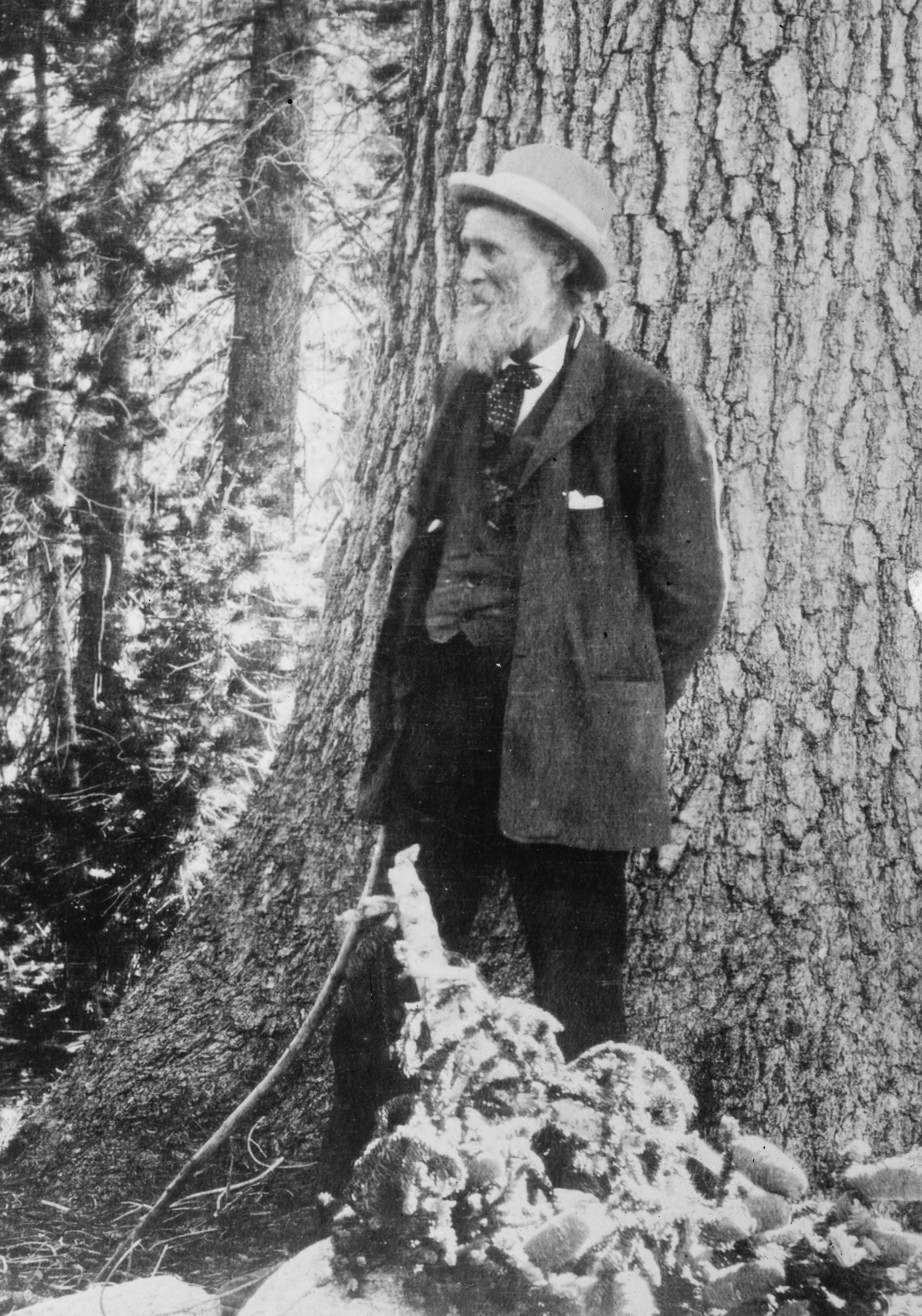
Pioneering environmentalist John Muir. Muir enrolled at the University of Wisconsin without any prior formal schooling.

Prior to the 20th century, entrance to most American colleges was by examination or by a preparatory course prescribed specifically for that college. Students who could demonstrate their readiness for higher education were able to enter at whatever age was appropriate. Many colleges routinely admitted students as young as fourteen. Some students entered college entirely self-taught, or after having received only informal tutoring.

In the late 19th century, as the subject matter of higher education became more diverse, pressure grew to standardize both higher education in general and the transition between secondary and higher education in particular. The first school to make the high school diploma a necessary and sufficient condition of admission was the University of Michigan in 1870; as high school education was standardized through accreditation bodies beginning in the 1880s, more colleges and universities followed Michigan's lead.

In the first decade of the 20th century, the Carnegie Foundation adopted the "count" system that the North Central Association had devised in 1902 to compare different secondary and tertiary curricula. 15 or 16 Carnegie units (corresponding to four years of high school) became a standard requirement for entry into American colleges and universities, and a high school diploma soon became the "sine qua non" for college entrance". Although many students did reach college before their 18th birthday, they could do so only if their high school accelerated them to early graduation.

=== First organized ventures ===
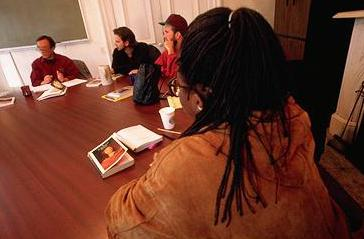
A discussion class at Shimer College. Shimer's early entrance program has contributed a significant fraction of the student body for more than 60 years.

Pushback against the artificial constraints imposed by the "Carnegie unit" system began in the early 1930s. Little Rock Junior College in Arkansas conducted an experimental program in 1933 and 1934, admitting students in the top 25% academically as freshmen after their junior year of high school. Another early innovator was the University of Louisville, which in 1934 also began admitting promising high school students after their junior year. These early programs all produced highly positive academic outcomes, but were not emulated elsewhere. Although the Louisville program was still active in the 1950s, as of 2011 the university only admits high school students on a concurrent enrollment basis.

A more radical approach was adopted by Robert Maynard Hutchins for the College of the University of Chicago. Beginning in 1937, the University of Chicago's experimental, interdisciplinary College program admitted students beginning in the sophomore year of high school. Because there were few formal requirements, early entrants in this program were largely self-selecting, and came mostly from nearby schools such as the University High School. Early entrants were subject to five additional comprehensive examinations, but otherwise went through the same academic program as high school graduates. Although the University of Chicago eventually abandoned this program, it was adopted by tiny Shimer College in 1950, and continues there in a modified form to the present day.

During World War II, the government made academic acceleration a high priority, particularly in high school, in order to ensure recruits were as highly educated as possible. In 1942, the Educational Policies Commission made a formal recommendation that colleges admit academically skilled high school students after their junior year. Schools including the University of Illinois and Ohio State University adopted wartime early entrance policies. The programs adopted in this period, however, faced stiff opposition from high schools, and did not outlast the war.

=== The Early Admission Program ===
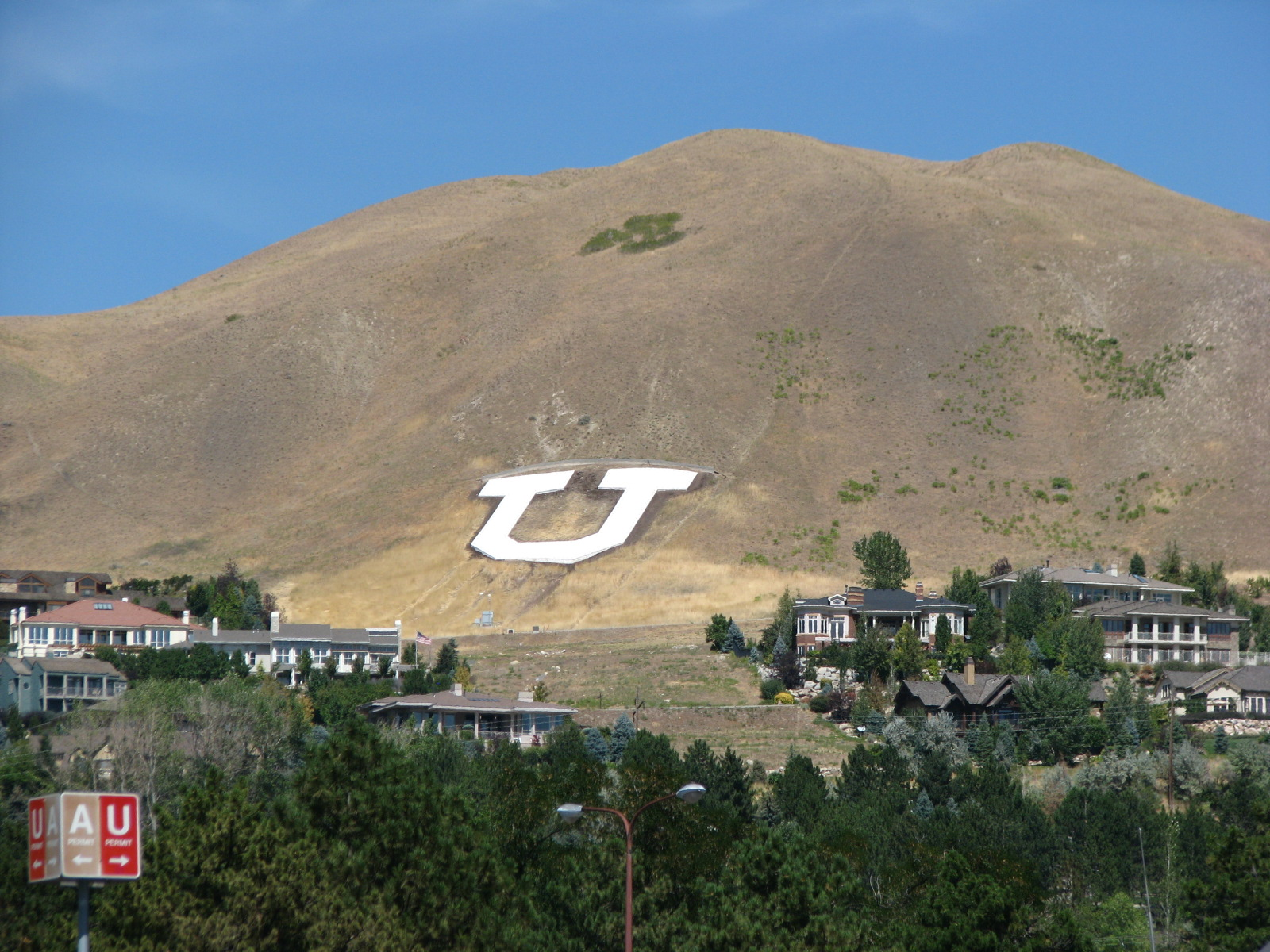
The University of Utah "U" in Salt Lake City. The University is one of the few original participants in the Early Admission Program to still admit selected high school juniors.

Robert Maynard Hutchins, who established the pioneering program at the University of Chicago, subsequently became head of the Ford Foundation in 1951. In this position, Hutchins established the Fund for the Advancement of Education, which provided a several-year grant for scholarship funding in the 1950s to support small early entrance programs at a wide spectrum of colleges and universities. Part of a suite of five programs addressing the transition between high school and college, the Early Admission Program drew impetus from the military's need for optimally trained recruits during the Korean War.

Although originally intended to involve only four large universities, the "Early Admission Program" ultimately encompassed twelve schools: Yale, Columbia, Wisconsin, Utah, Chicago, Louisville, Fisk, Goucher, Lafayette, Morehouse, Oberlin, and Shimer. Each school chose its own entrance requirements, with most opting to be highly selective. Shimer was unique in following the original Hutchins model and opening the program to all ability levels, although this approach was modified after the initial experiment.

National in scope and involving grants totaling US$3.4 million, the Early Admission Program targeted high school students who "seemed ready, both academically and in personal maturity, to undertake college work." The Fund commissioned two independent studies on the outcomes of the program, one approaching it from a psychological point of view and one from the perspective of educational attainment. Both studies reported strongly positive outcomes.

After the money from the Fund's grant ran out in the mid-1950s, many of the participating schools discarded the program. Among the first to do so was the University of Chicago, which in 1953 terminated the early entrance program it had been operating since the 1930s. Other schools, intrigued by the strong results, established experimental programs of their own; in 1956, 29 member schools of the College Board were operating early entrance programs, of which only 6 had been part of the Early Admission Program. But in the absence of strong institutional support, and facing resistance and skepticism from both high schools and universities, these programs subsequently died away. The early entrance programs at three of the original participating schools, however, continue to the present day: Shimer College, Goucher College, and the University of Utah.

=== Subsequent programs ===
School, high school and college had been the established order for a long time. The more I thought about this, the more I came to believe it was not right for our time.

— Elizabeth Blodgett Hall

In the 1960s, social pressure in favor of egalitarianism restrained any further large-scale efforts on gifted education, of which early entrance was considered a part. However, programs continued at a few of the EAP colleges.

In 1966, Simon's Rock opened as the only college in the United States with a student body consisting entirely of early entrants. Simon's Rock was founded by Elizabeth Blodgett Hall, formerly the headmistress of Concord Academy, who wanted to create "an institution that would provide learning for students who had begun to think independently."

In 1971, Julian Stanley at Johns Hopkins University reignited interest in early entrance and in gifted education generally with his Study of Mathematically Precocious Youth, in which he worked one-on-one with students entering Johns Hopkins as young as 13.

Following the Johns Hopkins example, in 1977 the University of Washington (UW) inaugurated the first structured early entrance program for students younger than 15. The UW program, known as the Transition School and Early Entrance Program, has provided a model for many subsequent early entrance programs targeting highly gifted students. Such programs include the all-girl Program for the Exceptionally Gifted established at Mary Baldwin University (formerly Mary Baldwin College) in 1985, allowing students to enroll as early as their seventh-grade year, as well as the Early Entrance Program at California State University, Los Angeles.

In 1978, the University of Science and Technology of China (USTC) started the first early entrance program in the People's Republic of China. As a result of this program's success, it was subsequently replicated at 12 additional universities in China.

== List of early entrance programs ==
=== Canada ===
Program name	Associated university	Location
The University Transition Program	University of British Columbia	Vancouver, British Columbia

=== China ===
Program name	Associated university	Location
Special Class for the Gifted Young	University of Science and Technology of China	Hefei, Anhui
Special Class for the Gifted Young	Xi'an Jiaotong University	Xi'an, Shaanxi

=== United States ===
Program name	Associated university	Location
Academy for Young Scholars	University of Washington	Seattle, Washington
Accelerated Scholars Program	Wentworth Military Academy	Lexington, Missouri
Advanced Academy of Georgia (defunct)	University of West Georgia	Carrollton, Georgia
Bard College at Simon's Rock	Bard College (Independently accredited)	Great Barrington, Massachusetts
Accelerated Collegiate Experience	Florida Gulf Coast University	Fort Myers, Florida
Boston University Academy	Boston University	Boston, Massachusetts
College Academy @ BC	Broward College	Davie, Florida
Early College at Northwestern	University of Northwestern – St. Paul	Roseville, Minnesota
Early College Program at Robert E. Lee High School	Florida State College at Jacksonville	Jacksonville, Florida
Early Entrance Program	California State University, Los Angeles	Los Angeles, California
Early Entrant Program	Shimer College	Chicago, Illinois
Early Honors Program	Alaska Pacific University	Anchorage, Alaska
Florida Atlantic University High School	Florida Atlantic University	Boca Raton, Florida
Georgia Academy	Middle Georgia State University	Cochran, Georgia
Kansas Academy of Mathematics and Science	Fort Hays State University	Hays, Kansas
Missouri Academy of Science, Mathematics and Computing	Northwest Missouri State University	Maryville, Missouri
Bucksbaum Early Entrance Academy	University of Iowa, Belin-Blank Center	Iowa City, Iowa
Program for the Exceptionally Gifted	Mary Baldwin University (women only)	Staunton, Virginia
Resident Honors Program	University of Southern California	Los Angeles, California
Texas Academy of Mathematics and Science	University of North Texas	Denton, Texas
The Clarkson School	Clarkson University	Potsdam, New York
The Early College at Guilford	Guilford College	Greensboro, North Carolina
The Early College of Forsyth	Forsyth Technical Community College	Winston-Salem, North Carolina
Transition School and Early Entrance Program	University of Washington	Seattle, Washington
The Carol Martin Gatton Academy of Mathematics and Science in Kentucky	Western Kentucky University	Bowling Green, Kentucky
The Craft Academy for Excellence in Science and Mathematics	Morehead State University	Morehead, Kentucky
Early College Program	College of Central Florida	Ocala, Florida
George Washington University Early College Program	The George Washington University	Washington, DC

== See also ==
- Early college high school

== Works cited ==
- Allen, John (Spring 2005). "The Ford Boys" (PDF). On Wisconsin: 30–35. Archived from the original (PDF) on 2011-12-10.
- Boardman, Charles W. (1943). "Findings from Selected Studies on Early Admission to College". The School Review. 51 (8): 460–470. doi:10.1086/440952. S2CID 144078073.
- Brubacher, John Seiler; Willis, Rudy (1997). Higher education in transition: A history of American colleges and universities (4th ed.). Transaction Publishers. ISBN 1560009179.
- Dzuback, Mary Ann (1991). Robert M. Hutchins: Portrait of an educator. University of Chicago Press. ISBN 0-226-17710-6.
- Fund for the Advancement of Education (1953). Bridging the gap between school and college. New York. OCLC 757300.
- Fund for the Advancement of Education (1957). They went to college early. New York. OCLC 00235008.
- Gross, Miraca; Van Vliet, Helen (2005). "Radical acceleration and early entry to college: A review of the research". Gifted Child Quarterly. 49 (2): 154–171. doi:10.1177/001698620504900205. S2CID 144450943.
- Harbeson, John W. (1943). "Acceleration on the Junior College Level". Official Report Including a Record of the National Convention, American Association of School Administrators: 124–126.
- Kerr, Barbara (2009). "Early Admission, College". Encyclopedia of Giftedness, Creativity, and Talent, Volume 1. SAGE. pp. 266–267. ISBN 978-1-412-94971-2.
- Muratori, Michelle (2007). Early entrance to college. Prufrock Press. ISBN 9781593631994.
- Rudolph, Frederick (1962). The American college and university: A history. University of Georgia Press. ISBN 0820312843.
- Scanlon, John J. (1955). "Challenging the Able Student". The High School Journal. 38 (6): 217–223.
- Thelin, John R. (2004). A history of American higher education. Taylor & Francis. ISBN 0801880041.
- Woodring, Paul (1970). Investment in innovation: An historical appraisal of the Fund for the Advancement of Education. Little, Brown & Co. OCLC 103369.
