= Harold Lewis (disambiguation) =

Harold Lewis (1923–2011) was an American physicist.

Harold Lewis may also refer to:

- Harold Ralph Lewis (1931–2002), American physicist
- H. Craig Lewis (Harold Craig Lewis, 1944–2013), American politician from Pennsylvania
- H. Gregg Lewis (Harold Gregg Lewis, 1914–1992), American economist
- H. H. Lewis (Harold Harwell Lewis, 1901–1985), Communist American poet

== See also ==
- Harry Lewis (disambiguation)
- Hal Lewis (disambiguation)
