= Early Entrance Program (CSU) =

California State University entrance program for gifted individuals

The Early Entrance Program (EEP) was an early college entrance program for gifted individuals of middle-school and high school ages at California State University, Los Angeles (CSULA), United States, based on a similar program of the same name at the University of Washington's Seattle campus (the Transition School and Early Entrance Program). The program allows participants to skip normal schooling and become full-time, degree-seeking college students. Among early college entrance programs in the United States, EEP (along with programs like UW Academy for Young Scholars) has adopted a different approach. Instead of offering a preparatory year, like Transition School students, or the more common model of dual enrollment, students are admitted directly into the university. Applicants to EEP largely come from the Greater Los Angeles Area, but some move from elsewhere in the United States or from other countries to attend.

== Students ==
There are approximately 40 students left in the Early Entrance Program, known as "EEPsters".

=== Transition to University Life ===
The program takes several intermediary steps ensure a smooth transition from a secondary school setting to university life. EEPsters had access to a lounge to socialize with each other. Support and guidance from families and older EEPsters help most freshmen adjust quickly to collegiate life. Older EEPsters often become active participants in university life, assimilating inconspicuously into roles of community service, organizations, and student governments.

=== Clubs and Organizations ===
EEPsters have participated in many of CSULA's on-campus clubs and organizations, including General Education Honors Club, Associated Students Incorporated (ASI Student Governance), and multiple research laboratories. The Early Entrance Program Club (EEPC) also provides a social outlet and community for EEPsters.

== Notable alumni ==
- Leana Wen, physician, public health advocate, author and Director of Planned Parenthood.
