= Ernest Henley =

Ernest Henley may refer to:

- Ernest Henley (athlete) (1889–1962), British athlete
- Ernest M. Henley (1924–2017), American atomic and nuclear physicist

== See also ==
- William Ernest Henley (1849–1903), English poet
