= Georgia Academy of Arts, Mathematics, Engineering and Science =

The Georgia Academy

Address
- 1100 Second St. Cochran, GA. 31014

Information
- School type: Dual-Enrollment Early College Program
- Established: 1997
- Director: Mrs. Susan N. Collins
- Staff: Mrs. Ashley Turner, Dr. David Fuller
- Grades: Rising 10th-12th graders
- Age range: 15-18
- Slogan: Georgia's Best and Brightest
- Newspaper: The Gauntlet
- School fees: Meal Plan, Room & Board, Lab Fee
- Website: Official website

The Georgia Academy (formerly the Georgia Academy of Arts, Mathematics, Engineering and Sciences, a.k.a. GAMES), is a dual-enrollment early college entrance program created in 1997 and facilitated by the University System of Georgia in the United States. Typically, juniors in high school who meet the base requirements of GPA and SAT/ACT scores may apply and be admitted to the two-year program which is located at the Cochran, Georgia campus of Middle Georgia State University, although rising seniors and exceptional sophomores may also apply. Students at the Georgia Academy receive college-level education with specialization in the fields of the arts, mathematics, engineering and science. Academy students take a full college course load and can participate in activities such as the Honors Program, Undergraduate Research, and collegiate clubs such as Science Club, Anime Club, Dungeons & Dragons, the PSYCH-KNIGHTS, Model African Union, Mock Mediation and Math Competition.

Students live in residence halls located on the Middle Georgia State University campus in Cochran, interact with faculty, and are given similar status to traditional students within the university. When students complete the program, they are awarded associate's degrees as well as high school diplomas from their former high schools, and can enter a four-year college or university with junior standing.

More than 700 students have been admitted to The Georgia Academy since its inception in 1997, and The Academy counts two Gates Millennium Scholars (2009 & 2014) among its many very successful alumni.

== After the Academy ==
Following completion of an associate degree from Middle Georgia State University and receiving a high school diploma, Academy alumni have gone on to attend schools such as:

- Agnes Scott College
- Auburn University
- Brenau University
- Brown University
- California Institute of Technology
- Carnegie Mellon University
- Clemson University
- College of Charleston
- Cornell University
- Duke University
- Emory University
- Fisk University
- Florida A&M University
- George Washington University
- Furman University
- Georgetown University
- Georgia Institute of Technology
- Georgia State University
- Howard University
- Illinois State University
- Iowa State University
- Johns Hopkins University
- Loyola University
- Massachusetts Institute of Technology
- Middle Georgia State University
- New York University
- Oglethorpe University
- Pennsylvania State University
- Purdue University
- Rochester Institute of Technology
- Samford University
- Tulane University
- University of Alabama
- University of California
- University of Chicago
- University of Colorado
- University of Florida
- University of Georgia
- University of Miami
- University of Oklahoma Honors College
- University of Pennsylvania
- University of South Carolina
- University of Southern California
- University of Tennessee
- University of Virginia
- U.S. Naval Academy
- Vanderbilt University
- Washington University
- Washington & Lee University
- Yale University

== The Georgia Academy Student Creed: ==
To Develop our potential in life through our individual, academic, and social endeavors;

To Promote respect, responsibility and maturity by displaying our elite character and integrity to the University and community;

To Live in unity with diversity while fully benefiting from the advantages of The Georgia Academy throughout the rest of our lives.

== See also ==
- Advanced Academy of Georgia
