= Samuel C. Atkinson =

American judge (1864–1942)

Samuel Carter Atkinson (1864 – October 5, 1942) was a justice of the Supreme Court of Georgia from 1906 until his death in 1942.

== Biography ==
Born in Brunswick, Georgia, he graduated from the University of Georgia in 1884 and entered the practice of law the following year.

He was a judge of the city court of Brunswick for a term of four years under the administration of Governor William Yates Atkinson. In December 1905, Governor Terrell announced his intent to appoint Atkinson to a seat being vacated by the resignation of Justice John S. Candler, effective January 15, 1906. Following Atkinson's appointment in 1906, remained on the court until 1942, and "held the distinction of having served on the court longer than any other justice in the state's history".

== Personal life and death ==
On January 10, 1906, Atkinson married Lillie Slaton, sister of John M. Slaton, who was then speaker of the Georgia House of Representatives, and who later served as governor of Georgia.

Atkinson died in a hospital at the age of 78.

Political offices
Preceded by John S. Candler	Justice of the Supreme Court of Georgia; 1906–1942	Succeeded by Samuel D. Hewlett
