= Samuel B. Adams =

American judge

Samuel Barnard Adams (September 8, 1853 – March 20, 1938) was a justice of the Supreme Court of Georgia in 1902.

Born in Savannah, Georgia, to William B. and Laleah Pratt Adams, Adams received an A.B. from the University of Georgia in 1872. After gaining admission to the bar in 1873, Adams entered the practice of law in Savannah, serving as a city attorney there for over twenty years. In 1877, Adams "was involved in a duel with another Savannah attorney, Rodolph Rufus Richards":

The challenge was issued by Richards as he felt that he had been dishonored by Adams. Neither man was harmed in the exchange of shots; they both signed a settlement apologizing to each other.

Due to his involvement in the duel, Adams was forced to leave his church, and join a different one.

In 1902, Adams was appointed by Governor Allen D. Candler to fill an unexpired term on the Supreme Court of Georgia, created by the resignation of Justice Henry T. Lewis.

Adams died in Savannah, and was interred in Bonaventure Cemetery.

Political offices
Preceded by Henry T. Lewis	Justice of the Supreme Court of Georgia; 1902–1902	Succeeded by John S. Candler
