= Hans Frauenfelder =

Swiss American physicist and biophysicist (1922–2022)

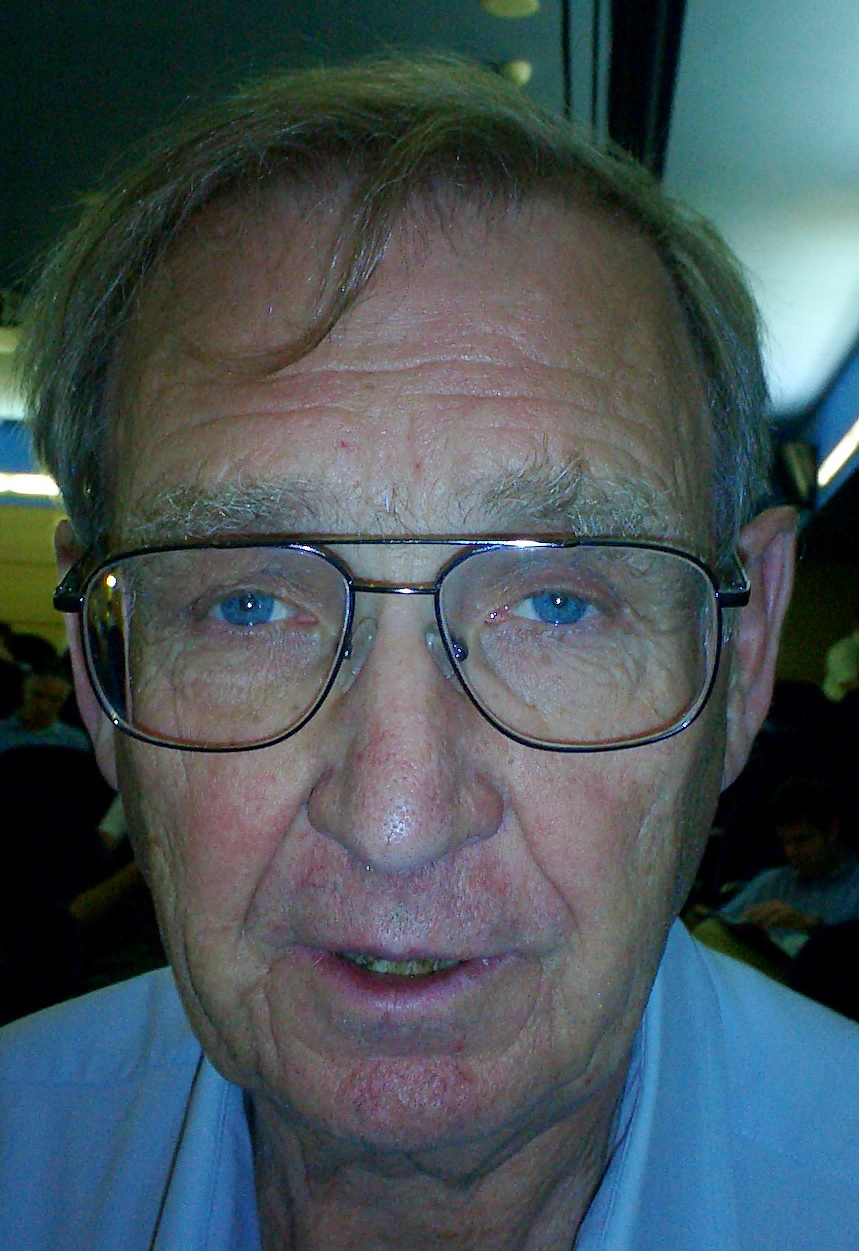
- Born: July 28, 1922; Schaffhausen, Switzerland
- Died: July 10, 2022 (aged 99); Tesuque, New Mexico, U.S.
- Citizenship: American
- Education: Swiss Federal Institute of Technology
- Known for: Perturbed angular correlation protein folding and dynamics
- Awards: Max Delbruck Prize (1992); Richtmyer Memorial Award (1981); Racah Lecture (1984); Guggenheim Fellowship (1958)
- Scientific career
- Fields: Physicist
- Workplaces: Los Alamos National Laboratory; University of Illinois at Urbana-Champaign
- Doctoral advisor: Paul Scherrer
- Other academic advisors: Gregor Wentzel; Wolfgang Pauli
- Doctoral students: Harold Ralph Lewis

Hans Frauenfelder (July 28, 1922 – July 10, 2022) was an American physicist and biophysicist notable for his discovery of perturbed angular correlation (PAC) in 1951. In the modern day, PAC spectroscopy is widely used in the study of condensed matter physics. Within biophysics, he is known for his experimental and theoretical research on the dynamical behavior of protein tertiary structure.

== Education ==
Frauenfelder received his Dr. sc. nat. in physics in 1950 at the Swiss Federal Institute of Technology (ETH) in Zurich under Paul Scherrer, his thesis being on the study of radioactive surfaces. At ETH, he was also taught by Gregor Wentzel and Wolfgang Pauli. Through Pauli, he also got to know many of the leading scientists such as Hendrik Kramers, Werner Heisenberg, Hans Jensen, and Wolfgang Paul.

== Career ==
Frauenfelder migrated to the United States in 1952, joining the department of physics at the University of Illinois at Urbana-Champaign as a research associate. He stayed at the UIUC till 1992, ultimately as Center for Advanced Study Professor of Physics, Chemistry, and Biophysics.

His research interests included nuclear physics, particle physics, conservation laws, the Mössbauer effect, and the biophysics of protein folding and motions.

Frauenfelder was a visiting scientist at the European Organization for Nuclear Research (CERN) in 1958/59, 1963 and 1973.

In 1992, Frauenfelder moved to the Los Alamos National Laboratory where he directed the Center for Nonlinear Studies (CNLS) until 1997. In 1997, he left CNLS and joined the theoretical biology and biophysics group at Los Alamos (T-10 recently renamed T-6) and continued research in biophysics.

Frauenfelder was the inventor of the "Frauenfelder Rules", which provide a guideline about the most successful way to run a seminar at a research workshop, according to which a presentation should take up no more than 66% of the allotted time, the rest being used for questions and in-depth discussion.

== Personal life ==
Frauenfelder died in Tesuque, New Mexico, on July 10, 2022, eighteen days away from his 100th birthday.

== Honors ==
Frauenfelder was elected a Fellow of the American Physical society in 1961. He was a member of the National Academy of Sciences (elected in 1975), the American Philosophical Society, and a Foreign Member of the Royal Swedish Academy of Sciences.

== Publications ==
- Thomas G. Ebrey, Hans Frauenfelder, Barry Honig, and Koji Nakanishi Biophysical Studies, University of Illinois Press (1988) ISBN 0-252-01528-2
- Hans Frauenfelder, The Mössbauer Effect, W. A. Benjamin, Inc. (1962) ASIN B000Q7QEBG
- Hans Frauenfelder and Ernest M. Henley, Subatomic Physics, Benjamin Cummings (1991) ISBN 0-13-859430-9

== See also ==
- Wolfgang Pauli
- Paul Scherrer
- Quantum Aspects of Life
