= Harold Ralph Lewis =

African American physicist

Harold Ralph Lewis, Jr.
- Born: 7 June 1931; Chicago, Illinois
- Died: 25 March 2002 (aged 70); Hanover, New Hampshire
- Education: University of Chicago; University of Illinois Urbana-Champaign
- Known for: Ermakov–Lewis invariant
- Scientific career
- Thesis: [ProQuest 301884940 A Method for Measuring Magnetic Fields in Superconductors] (1958)
- Doctoral advisor: Hans Frauenfelder

Harold Ralph Lewis, Jr., (7 June 1931 - 25 March 2002) was an American physicist, researcher at the Los Alamos National Laboratory, and professor at Dartmouth College. Lewis worked on Project Sherwood and conducted research in nuclear physics and plasma physics.

== Early life and education ==
Harold Ralph Lewis was born on 7 June 1931 in Chicago, Illinois.

Lewis completed his undergraduate studies at the University of Chicago, where he earned A.B. and S.B. degrees in physics. He received his A.B. in 1951 and S.B. in 1953.

He then began his graduate studies at the University of Illinois Urbana-Champaign, where he completed his master's degree in physics in 1955 and his PhD in physics in 1958. His doctoral thesis was titled "A Method for Measuring Magnetic Fields in Superconductors," and his doctoral advisor was Hans Frauenfelder. His thesis combined experimental research in nuclear physics and superconductivity.

== Career ==
After completing his graduate studies, Lewis was a postdoctoral research associate at Heidelberg University from 1958 to 1960. During those two years, he conducted research in theoretical nuclear physics at the university's Institute for Theoretical Physics.

From 1960 to 1963, he was an instructor in the physics department at Princeton University. There, his research focused on experimental work in nuclear spectroscopy.

In 1963, Lewis pivoted his research focus to plasma physics, and joined the Los Alamos National Laboratory (LANL) as a staff scientist. He worked on Project Sherwood, which would later become the controlled thermonuclear division. Lewis' research centered on controlled thermonuclear fusion project, and he served as deputy group leader and associate group leader of the magnetic fusion theory group.

From 1975 to 1976, Lewis took a yearlong leave from LANL and served as a visiting professor at the University of Wisconsin-Madison. Over the course of his career, he also held visiting faculty positions at Pennsylvania State University; the University of the Witwatersrand; the Culham Centre for Fusion Energy in the United Kingdom; and the French Alternative Energies and Atomic Energy Commission (CEA) and the French National Centre for Scientific Research (CNRS). He tutored in the undergraduate and graduate programs at St. John’s College in Santa Fe, New Mexico.

Lewis became a professor of physics at Dartmouth College in 1991, and taught there until his retirement in 1999.

== Research ==
In his doctoral and postdoctoral research, Lewis' focused on nuclear physics; superconductivity; theoretical nuclear physics; and experimental nuclear spectroscopy.

Starting in 1963 at LANL, Lewis' research centered on plasma physics, with an emphasis on the theory of collisionless plasmas. Other research contributions have included: "the study of explicitly time-dependent invariants of time-dependent Hamiltonian systems, description of solutions of the initial-value problem for the small-signal response of collisionless plasmas, use of Hamilton's principle to generate algorithms for the numerical simulation of the equations of collisionless plasmas and other Hamiltonian systems; and the application of time-dependent operator invariants in the description of quantum systems." Lewis' research in this direction led him to rediscover the Ermakov-Lewis invariant, a quantity conserved during Hamiltonian evolution of a harmonic oscillator system.

While at Dartmouth, Lewis published on plasma physics of nonideal magnetohydrodynamic steady states in fusion devices and on some nonlinear mechanics problems. He also used computing resources at the National Energy Research Scientific Computing Center.

== Other work ==
In 1973, Lewis contributed to a six-volume translation of Wolfgang Pauli's lecture notes, Pauli Lectures on Physics, from German to English.

== Awards ==
In 1983, Lewis became a fellow of the Los Alamos National Laboratory. He was also a fellow of the American Physical Society. Other awards include:

- University fellow at the University of Illinois Urbana-Champaign, 1954
- Honorary M.A. from Dartmouth College, 1993

== Personal life ==
Lewis was married to Renate Lewis and they had two children. He was fluent in German, and an accomplished clarinetist and outdoorsman.
