= Advanced Academy of Georgia =

- Type: Public
- Active: 1995–2017
- Location: Carrollton, Georgia, United States
- Colors: Blue and Red

The Advanced Academy of Georgia was a residential joint high school and early college entrance program at the University of West Georgia in Carrollton, Georgia. It was established by Dr. Beheruz Sethna in the 1995–1996 academic year. It stopped accepting new residential students during the 2015-2016 academic year, and the program was phased out in May 2017. Students earned a full year of high school credit in one semester at the college level.

== See also ==
- Georgia Academy of Arts, Mathematics, Engineering and Science
