= Ermakov–Lewis invariant =

Invariant in quantum mechanics

In quantum mechanics, the Ermakov–Lewis invariant is a conserved quantity used to analyze explicitly time-dependent systems, especially the time-dependent harmonic oscillator. Because many quantum Hamiltonians are time-dependent, methods that identify constants of motion or invariants are central; the Ermakov–Lewis invariant provides such an integral of motion and underpins exact or approximate solutions. It is one of several invariants known for this system.

Let $\Omega : \R \to \R$ be a function. It defines a time dependent harmonic oscillator Hamiltonian reads

$$\hat{H} =\frac{1}{2}\left[\hat{p}^2+\Omega^2(t)\hat{q}^2\right].$$

The Ermakov–Lewis invariant for this type of interaction is

$$\hat{I}=\frac{1}{2}\left[  \left( \frac{\hat{q}}{\rho}\right)
^{2}+(\rho\hat{p}-\dot{\rho}\hat{q})^{2}\right],$$

where $\rho : \R \to \R$ is a solution to the Ermakov equation

$$\ddot{\rho}+\Omega^{2}\rho=\rho^{-3}.$$

$\hat{I}$ is a unitary transformation of the time independent harmonic oscillator Hamiltonian:
$$\frac{1}{2}\left[\hat{p}^2+\hat{q}^2\right]=\hat{T}\hat{I}\hat{T}^{\dagger}, \quad \hat{T}=e^{i\frac{\ln\rho }{2}(\hat{q}\hat{p}+\hat{p}\hat{q}
)}e^{-i\frac{\dot{\rho}}{2\rho}\hat{q}^{2}}=
e^{i\frac{\ln\rho}{2}\frac{d\hat{q}^2}{dt}}
e^{-i\frac{\hat{q}^{2}}{2}\frac{d\ln\rho}{dt}},$$
This allows an easy form to express the solution of the Schrödinger equation for the time dependent Hamiltonian. The exponential term $e^{i\frac{\ln\rho }{2}(\hat{q}\hat{p}+\hat{p}\hat{q} )}$ is a squeeze operator. The other exponential term $e^{-i\frac{\dot{\rho}}{2\rho}\hat{q}^{2}}$ is a shear operator (momentum-dependent phase shift).

This approach simplifies problems such as the Quadrupole ion trap, where an ion is trapped in a harmonic potential with time dependent frequency.

== Phase-space geometry ==
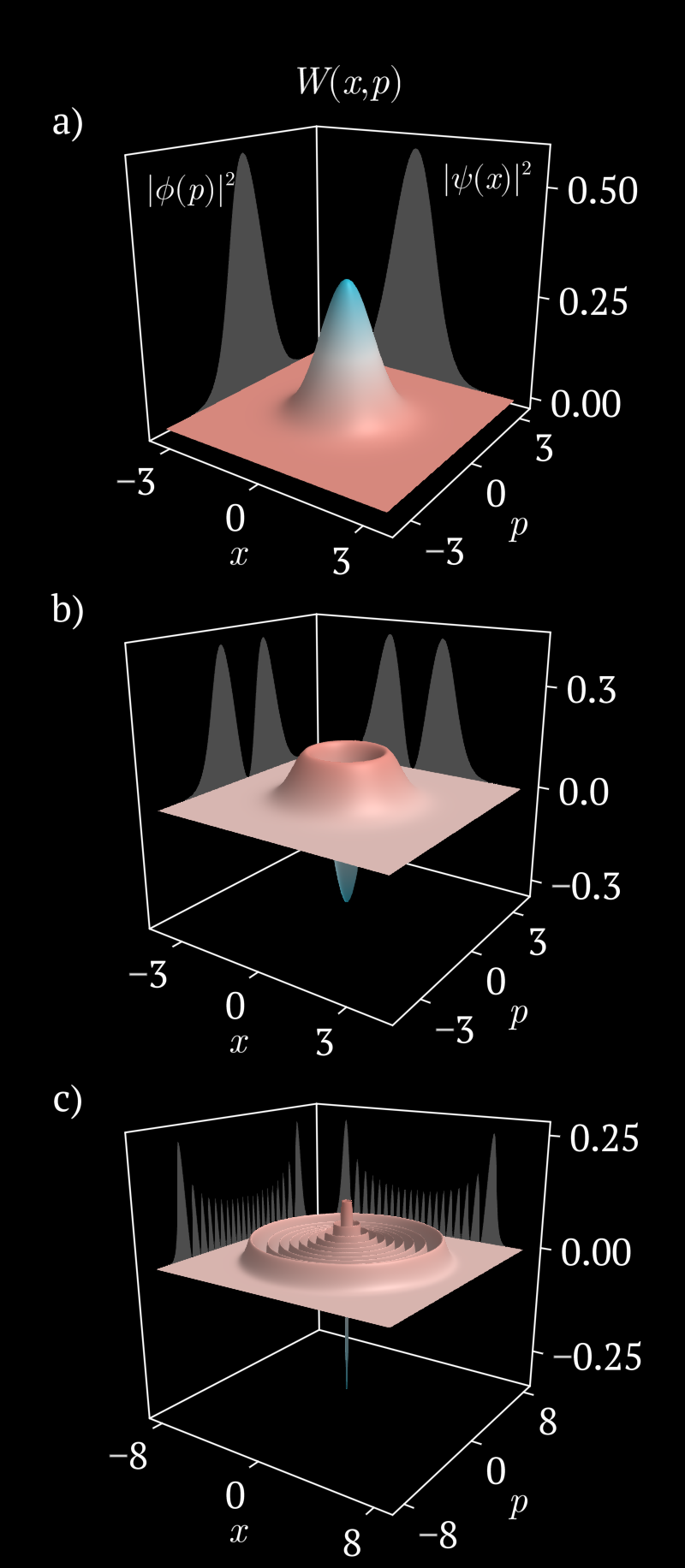
Wigner function for number states a) n = 0, b) n = 1, and c) n = 19. Marginal distributions for x and p are recovered by integrating over p and x respectively.

This invariant has a geometrically intuitive interpretation in Wigner's form of phase-space quantum mechanics.

For any quadratic Hamiltonian the phase-space flow is linear and symplectic. Writing $\mathbf x=(q,p)^{\mathsf T}$, the classical evolution is

$$\mathbf x(t)=S(t)\,\mathbf x(0),\qquad S(t)\in \mathrm{Sp}(2,\mathbb R).$$

Introduce the Ermakov–Lewis scaling

$$\binom{Q}{P}=L(t)\binom{q}{p},\qquad L(t)=
\begin{pmatrix}
\rho^{-1}(t)&0\\[2pt]
-\dot\rho(t)&\rho(t)
\end{pmatrix},$$

for which the invariant becomes $\tfrac12\!\left(Q^{2}+P^{2}\right)$ and the dynamics is a pure rotation. In these variables

$$\binom{Q(t)}{P(t)}=R(\theta(t))\binom{Q(0)}{P(0)},\quad
R(\theta)=\begin{pmatrix}\cos\theta&\sin\theta\\ -\sin\theta&\cos\theta\end{pmatrix},\quad
\theta(t)=\int_{0}^{t}\!\frac{d\tau}{\rho^{2}(\tau)},$$

with $\rho$ solving the Ermakov equation (see above). Transforming back gives

$$S(t)=L(t)^{-1}R(\theta(t))L(0)=
\begin{pmatrix}\rho&0\\ \dot\rho&\rho^{-1}\end{pmatrix}
R(\theta(t))
\begin{pmatrix}\rho(0)^{-1}&0\\ -\dot\rho(0)&\rho(0)\end{pmatrix}.$$

Because the Wigner function evolves by the pullback of the classical flow for quadratic Hamiltonians,

$$W(\mathbf x,t)=W_{0}\!\left(S(t)^{-1}\mathbf x\right),$$

any initial Gaussian remains Gaussian. For an initial coherent state of the unit oscillator with mean $\boldsymbol\mu_{0}$ and covariance $\Sigma_{0}=\tfrac12 I$,

$$\boldsymbol\mu(t)=S(t)\boldsymbol\mu_{0},\qquad
\Sigma(t)=S(t)\Sigma_{0}S(t)^{\mathsf T}=\tfrac12\,S(t)S(t)^{\mathsf T}.$$

Geometrically, the contours of $W(\cdot,t)$ are ellipses whose axes "breathe" via $\rho(t)$ and whose orientation rotates by $\theta(t)$. In the scaled coordinates $(Q,P)$, or equivalently under the unitary $\hat T$ given above, the state is a circular Gaussian rotating at constant angular velocity, so all deformation in the laboratory $(q,p)$ plane is captured by the time-dependent squeeze $L(t)$ and variable-velocity rotation $R(\theta)$.

== History ==
It was proposed in 1880 by Vasilij Petrovich Ermakov (1845-1922). The paper is translated in.

In 1966, Ralph Lewis rediscovered the invariant using Kruskal's asymptotic method. He published the solution in 1967.
