= John S. Candler =

American judge and colonel (1861–1941

John Slaughter Candler
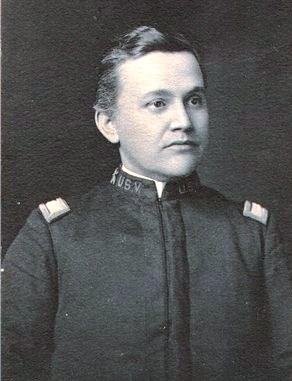
- Candler during the Spanish–American War
- Born: October 22, 1861; Villa Rica, Georgia, U.S.
- Died: December 9, 1941 (aged 80); Location Unknown
- Burial place: Westview Cemetery, Atlanta, Georgia, U.S.
- Education: Emory University
- Military career
- Allegiance: United States
- Branch: United States Volunteers
- Service years: 1898–1899
- Rank: Colonel
- Commands: 3rd Georgia Volunteer Infantry Regiment
- Wars: Spanish–American War

Justice of the Supreme Court of Georgia
- In office 1902–1906
- Preceded by: Samuel B. Adams
- Succeeded by: Samuel C. Atkinson

John Slaughter Candler (October 22, 1861 – December 9, 1941) was an American judge and a colonel of the Spanish–American War. He was known for commanding the 3rd Georgia Volunteers during the war and as the Justice of the Supreme Court of Georgia from 1902 to 1906. He was also Georgia Superior Court judge from 1896 to 1902.

== Biography ==
Candler was born on October 22, 1861, at Villa Rica, Georgia. He was the son of Georgia State Representative Samuel C. Candler and Martha Bernetta Beall. During his years at Emory University, he was initiated at the Kappa Alpha Order in 1877 and elected Grand Historian in 1881. He managed to establish fourteen chapters, the Kappa Alpha Magazine and the first state association during his two terms. Candler graduated from Emory when he was 19 years old and began teaching in DeKalb County.

Candler then studied law and was admitted to the bar in 1882. From 1887 to 1892, he was made the Auditor General of Georgia. He was then made the Georgia Superior Court judge from 1896 to 1902. He was also a Solicitor General of the Stone Mountain Circuit.

During his life, Candler had married three times. He first married Marguerite Louise Garnie Candler in 1884 until her death in 1905. He later married with Florrie George Anderson Candler until her death in 1935. In 1937, he married his secretary, Miss Martha Erwin. He also had 2 children: Asa Warren Candler and Alice Garnie Candler Guy. In 1902, he was made the Justice of the Supreme Court of Georgia from 1902 to 1906.

== Spanish–American War ==
Candler's career as a Superior Court judge was interrupted with the outbreak of the Spanish–American War. He enlisted in the United States Volunteers. He helped to organize and muster the 3rd Georgia Volunteer Infantry Regiment and the process was completed by August 24, 1898, at Camp Northen. It remained there until November 21 when the regiment was sent to Savannah to prepare to embark for Cuba. In 1899, it returned to Georgia and was mustered out at Augusta the same year. Before it was mustered out however, Candler commanded and led the regiment to Palmetto in a peacekeeping operation during the Lynching of Sam Hose. He replaced Capt. W.W. Barker, who was the initial commander of the regiment sent to impose martial law.

Political offices
| Preceded by Samuel B. Adams | Justice of the Supreme Court of Georgia; 1902–1906 | Succeeded by Samuel C. Atkinson |
