= Henry Clay Lewis =

American author and physician (1825–1850)

- Born: Henry Clay Lewis; June 26, 1825; Charleston, South Carolina, United States
- Died: August 5, 1850 (aged 25)
- Occupations: Writer, Doctor.
- Writing career
- Pen name: Madison Tensas
- Genres: Humor, Horror, medicine, historical, slaves.

Henry Clay Lewis (1825–1850) was an American short-story writer and medical doctor whose work is largely attributed as the greatest example of humor in the Old Southwest.

Lewis wrote in the style of Old Southwest Humor for his only work, Odd Leaves from the Life of a Louisiana Swamp Doctor, which is a collection of skits he wrote and then organized under the pseudonym Madison Tensas. His book depicted humorous clashes between polite and primitive cultures while using dialect for comic effects. The subject matter of Lewis's work was derived from encounters with planters, farmers, slaves, swamp dwellers, and hunters in the region.

== Early life ==
Much of Lewis's life is known through the skit in his book "My Early Life" and tales from family members after his passing, leaving the authenticity to be questioned, especially because he was writing fictionally in his skits.

Lewis was born in Charleston, South Carolina, to David and Rachel Saloman Lewis, on June 26, 1825. It is unknown whether he was the seventh or the eighth child because of conflicting reports. He moved to Cincinnati at an early age, and after his mother died in 1831 he moved in with his older brother, Alexander Lewis, until he grew bored of his life at his brother's home and fled aboard a steamboat set for New Orleans at the age of ten. He worked on a ship for many years as a scullery boy, a cook, and a cabin boy before coming to Yazoo City, Mississippi, previously known as Manchester, and finding his other brother, Joseph Lewis, who convinced Henry to stay with him. Joseph's meager fortune ran out during the depression in 1837 and Henry was forced to return to work to make ends meet, this time as a farmhand. In 1842, Dr. Washington Dorsely, a friend of Joseph's, took interest in Henry and took him in as one of many apprentices.

== Medical profession ==
Lewis worked as an apprentice to Dorsely for two years, until the fall of 1844, when he was enrolled as a medical student at Louisville Medical Institute. It is in the medical skits that we begin to see the humor in Lewis's writing, such as in the skit "Getting Acquainted with Medicines", where Lewis is still an apprentice to Dorsely. In the skit, through a very exaggerated portrayal of Native Americans, Lewis talks about a time a Native American named Tubba drank from a bottle labeled poison, and, after Lewis and his fellow apprentices feared for the foolish Native American, the doctor came back from his rounds and revealed that the bottle actually was whisky, which he had labeled as poison to keep the apprentices out. This suggests that Lewis got a fair amount of hands-on study with medicine even before enrolling in school. Lewis studied at the institute for two years under seven professors and graduated on time, despite apparently being a bit quarrelsome and a bit of a drunk in his first year. In another skit, Lewis talks about his graduating exam, where he had to fill 15 minutes with medical discussion with his professors, instead of trying to impress the professors, he brought controversial medical topics into the room and got the professors to bicker with each other to fill time. After they gave him his doctoral licence to practice, in the skit Lewis said it gave him "a free permit to kill whom [he] pleased without fear of the law."

Again, it is hard to know how much of these skits are factual, but it can be led to believe that they at least have a basis in reality from the way many of the events described in the skits match up with real-life documentation. The rest of Lewis' skits likely match up with the rest of his life, as he wrote the skits and practiced medicine for the rest of his short life.

== Writing ==
Lewis started publishing his skits in small humor newspapers and anthologies in the mid to late 1840s and collected them in a small book in 1850, although there are some reports that the book was published in 1848, this is thought to be an error. He published under the pseudonym Madison Tensas, M.D., The Louisiana Swamp Doctor and he was only ever properly attributed as the true writer 75 years after his death when John Q Anderson compiled a documentary and found proof of Lewis's authorship. His writing was popular, but it was not without criticism of sometimes being too grotesque with Lewis' fascination with gore and death and his morbid humor. His book was growing more popular, but he would be unable to see its success due to his death in 1850.

== Death ==
Lewis died at the age of 25 on August 5, 1850, from drowning. He was crossing a flooded river after treating some cholera patients and was unable to cross successfully.
