= University of West Georgia =

Public university in Carrollton, Georgia, US

- Former names: Fourth District A&M School (1906–1933); West Georgia College (1933–1996); State University of West Georgia (1996–2005)
- Motto: Go West, Go Wolves!
- Type: Public university
- Established: 1906
- Parent institution: University System of Georgia
- Academic affiliations: Space-grant
- Endowment: $60.1 million
- President: Dr. Michael Johnson
- Students: 16,072 (fall 2025)
- Undergraduates: 10,075 (fall 2025)
- Postgraduates: 5,997 (fall 2025)
- Location: Carrollton, Georgia, United States; 33°34′18″N 85°06′53″W
- Campus: College Town 644 acres (2.61 km^{2})
- Colors: Red and Blue
- Nickname: Wolves
- Sporting affiliations: NCAA Division I – UAC; ASUN
- Mascot: Wolfie
- Website: www.westga.edu
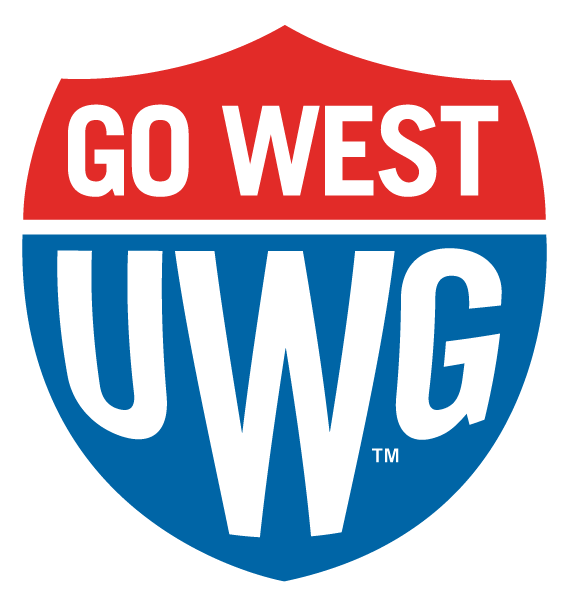

The University of West Georgia is a public university in Carrollton, Georgia, United States. The university offers a satellite campus in Newnan, Georgia, select classes at its Douglasville Center, and off-campus Museum Studies classes at the Atlanta History Center in Atlanta, Georgia. A total of 16,072 students, including 10,075 undergraduate and 5,997 graduate, were enrolled as of fall 2025. The university is also one of four comprehensive universities in the University System of Georgia.

== History ==
In 1906 the decision to create the Fourth District Agricultural and Mechanical School occurred in response to a call for a "more realistic educational program for rural youth" aged 13 to 21. The Bonner plantation was chosen as the location for the school.

John H. Melson served as the school's first principal from 1908 to 1920. John Melson and his wife Penelope worked intimately alongside the students who attended the school and further enhanced the institution. In addition, Penelope Melson was the one responsible for creating the library at the college. In January 1908, she conducted a "book shower" which provided the school with a little over 300 manuscripts.

In 1920 Irvine S. Ingram, whom UWG's library is named after, became Melson's successor and the second principal of the A&M school. He married fellow faculty member Martha Munro in 1921 and they had one daughter, Anne, in 1924. Ingram was instrumental in developing the concept of "extension" education and adult-education offerings along with a summer school program for local teachers to develop their skills. The school's name (Fourth District Agricultural and Mechanical School) was changed to West Georgia College in 1933 and it became a two-year institution. When this occurred, Ingram became the college's first president. He served until 1960 and was succeeded by William H. Row. Shortly after, Row died from a heart attack and Ingram filled in as president for six months in 1961 until James E. Boyd was appointed to the position. While president, Ingram saw West Georgia become a four-year institution in 1957. He can also be credited with obtaining a substantial grant of $250,000 from the Rosenwald Foundation used to expand the college's facilities and programs, including the Sanford building, originally used as a library and creating the College in the Country program, initially an adult or continuing education program that eventually involved student teachers from the college, and foreign exchange programs that brought national recognition to the college.

James E. Boyd, became the president of West Georgia College in 1961. Boyd is most known for peacefully integrating the campus (without waiting for a court order) in 1963 by inviting a young black woman, Lillian Williams, to attend the college; she would eventually earn two degrees in education and earn the college's highest honor, the Founder's Award, in 1985.

In May 1964, Boyd invited Robert F. Kennedy to the dedication of the campus chapel as the Kennedy Chapel, as U.S. president John F. Kennedy's death had occurred in November 1963. Robert would promote the Civil Rights Act of 1964 which was being debated in the United States Senate.

Boyd dramatically expanded the college during his tenure in both headcount and academic diversity. In sheer numbers, there were 1089 students upon his arrival and 5503 students upon his departure. In 1959, there were two degrees and five programs available; in 1969–70 there were seven degrees and 45 programs. There were 94 graduate students in 1961 and 741 in 1969, due to the first master's programs being offered in 1967.

In 1969 alone, 80 new faculty members were hired, a number larger than the total number of faculty members a decade prior. Several new buildings, including but not limited to nine residence halls and five academic buildings, were constructed. Policy changes occurred as well: in 1966, the curfew for junior and senior women was abolished, and fraternities and sororities were allowed on campus. In 1970, Boyd was named Georgia's first vice chancellor for academic development, effective once his successor was found, which occurred in 1971; it was Emory University and Duke University graduate Ward Pafford.

=== Segregation ===
Until 1963, the college did not admit African-American students. In 1955 and 1956 Jeff Long, a teacher at Carver High School, encouraged students to apply for admission to West Georgia. Every senior applied, and every student was denied admission on the basis of their race. President Boyd racially integrated the campus in 1963. The first Black student was Lillian Williams, a mother of 4 and teacher in the non-integrated Carroll County School System. In 2002, President Sethna apologized to the Carver class of 1955. A scholarship fund has been started for descendants of the Carver students who were denied admission. There is also a scholarship in the name of Lillian Williams, for any mothers who want to start or continue their education.

== Academics ==
The university offers numerous programs of study at the undergraduate, graduate, and doctoral levels through the Richards College of Business, the Tanner Health System School of Nursing, the College of Education, the College of Arts, Culture, and Scientific Inquiry, The School of Communication, Film, and Media, and the Honors College. The university also offers Certificate Programs and Specialist programs for Educators to help undergraduate and graduate students better their profession. In addition, the university was one of few in the United States to hold a residential, early entrance to college opportunity for high school juniors and seniors, the Advanced Academy of Georgia. Advanced Academy students took college courses and resided on campus under the supervision of professional residential staff.

University rankings
National
| U.S. News & World Report | 293-381 |
| Washington Monthly | 200 |

=== Psychology program ===
The university is one of only two public universities in the United States offering a psychology program with a humanistic and transpersonal focus. In 1967, Mike Arons, a student of Abraham Maslow, Paul Ricoeur, and Jim Klee became chair of the West Georgia psychology department. Jim Thomas, then on the psychology faculty at West Georgia, and others had asked Maslow to recommend someone to them to initiate a humanistic emphasis there, and Arons was Maslow's recommendation.

The department has offered a Ph.D. in psychology since the fall of 2011. In February 2011 The Ph.D., "Psychology: Consciousness and Society," was approved by the Board of Regents of the University System of Georgia.

=== 2019 faculty lay-offs ===
In the fall semester of 2019, UWG issued non-renewal letters to numerous tenure-track faculty that informed them they would be let go at the end of the spring 2020 semester. Student protests ensued as some students were outraged faculty were let go before considering other options. The faculty that were non-renewed/laid off remain so and were informed that the decision stands as of January 2020.

== Student life ==
Undergraduate demographics as of Fall 2023
| Race and ethnicity | Total |
|---|---|
| White | 50% |
| Black | 32% |
| Hispanic | 9% |
| Two or more races | 5% |
| Asian | 1% |
| International student | 1% |
| Unknown | 1% |
Economic diversity
| Low-income (Note: The percentage of students who received an income-based federal Pell grant intended for low-income students.) | 47% |
| Affluent (Note: The percentage of students who are a part of the American middle class at the bare minimum.) | 53% |

Students have access to 150 student organizations covering academics, cultural/international, departmental/educational, professional and honor groups, politics, science, religion, service, recreation and sports, health center, and social fraternities and sororities. In order to be a part of a fraternity or sorority, one must have a certain GPA, as well as above freshman classification.

Wolves Don't Waste (WDW) is a student organization founded around increasing awareness of food insecurity. Students coordinate with campus dining to decrease the amount of food wasted or thrown away through food recovery, and make food available to faculty, staff, students, and community members in need.

UWG's marching band consists of over 100 members and is known for its high energy and athleticism. Each performance finishes with the band playing and dancing to the hit tune "Long Train Runnin'". The Jazz Percussion Group has also performed throughout Europe and the United States as well as jazz festivals and state conferences. The JPG has brought numerous honors to the university since its beginning in 2003.

The pedestrian campus also includes a library with 561,900 volumes, a gym with an eighth-mile indoor running track, computer labs, tennis courts, baseball fields, soccer fields, a nature trail, a quarter-mile (400 m) running track, two climbing walls, and basketball courts.

The university once operated a noncommercial radio station, WUWG, at 90.7 MHz. It had been on the air since 1973 as WWGC until 2001, serving all of Carrollton and Carroll County, as well as the student body of the university. Originally a diverse college radio station, it is now a listener-supported public radio affiliate of Georgia Public Broadcasting, simulcasting the GPB radio network most of the time.

In fall 2009, the Mass Communications department soft-launched The WOLF Internet Radio. The station officially debuted in April 2010, after two months of limited programming from its studio in the basement of the Anthropology Building. The station's motto is "For students by students." Two grants from the Technology Fee Committee, totaling about $72,600, kick-started the station.

=== Greek Village ===
Acting as a small community within the larger UWG community, the Greek Village features 18 houses ranging in size. These houses are complete with a living and or chapter room, kitchen, laundry facilities, a mix of single and double bedrooms, and semi-private bathrooms. Also included within the village are outdoor green spaces, adequate parking, and a commons building. Greek Village has also recently added a pavilion, a basketball court, a volleyball court, and a fireplace with grills for everyone's use.

The effort to create such a facility allows for the university to not only expand its housing offerings but also attract new students to UWG, making it more of a destination university. Additionally, within the Greek system at UWG, there are three different governing councils: Panhellenic, Interfraternity, and National Pan-Hellenic. In creating the Greek Village, it became possible for these different groups to share a space together for the first time.

== Student demographics ==
Composition of student body by race and gender

| Year | African/Black American | American Indian/Alaskan Native | Asian or Pacific Islander | Asian | Native Hawaiian/Pacific Islander | Caucasian/White | Hispanic | Multiracial | Other/Undeclared | Female | Male |
|---|---|---|---|---|---|---|---|---|---|---|---|
| 2017 | 4,908 | 16 | N/A | 187 | 18 | 6,926 | 790 | 442 | 233 | 8,881 | 4,639 |
| 2016 | 4,898 | 20 | N/A | 184 | 17 | 6,868 | 681 | 419 | 221 | 8,733 | 4,575 |
| 2015 | 4,625 | 19 | N/A | 178 | 17 | 6,829 | 586 | 363 | 217 | 8,325 | 4,509 |
| 2014 | 4,313 | 17 | N/A | 199 | 14 | 6,637 | 506 | 365 | 155 | 7,878 | 4,328 |
| 2013 | 4,002 | 23 | N/A | 165 | 12 | 6,719 | 484 | 347 | 177 | 7,675 | 4,254 |
| 2012 | 3,692 | 26 | N/A | 200 | 10 | 6,755 | 470 | 372 | 244 | 7,376 | 4,393 |
| 2011 | 3,486 | 27 | N/A | 179 | 14 | 6,904 | 456 | 308 | 272 | 7,253 | 4,393 |
| 2010 | 2,959 | 36 | N/A | 163 | 10 | 6,422 | 348 | 152 | 1,193 | 7,051 | 4,232 |
| 2009 | 2,920 | 44 | N/A | 181 | 7 | 7,059 | N/A | 84 | 1,205 | 7,182 | 4,318 |
| 2008 | 2,837 | 32 | 192 | N/A | N/A | 7,364 | 272 | 259 | 296 | 7,075 | 4,177 |
| 2007 | 2,707 | 29 | 188 | N/A | N/A | 7,142 | 214 | 217 | 180 | 6,700 | 3,977 |
| 2006 | 2,461 | 22 | 161 | N/A | N/A | 7,136 | 199 | 184 | N/A | 6,406 | 3,757 |
| 2005 | 2,342 | 22 | 155 | N/A | N/A | 7,281 | 171 | 183 | N/A | 6,376 | 3,778 |
| 2004 | 2,367 | 24 | 161 | N/A | N/A | 7,363 | 151 | 150 | N/A | 6,446 | 3,770 |
| 2003 | 2,314 | 24 | 139 | N/A | N/A | 7,505 | 127 | 146 | N/A | 6,561 | 3,694 |
| 2002 | 2,132 | 20 | 80 | N/A | N/A | 7,135 | 93 | 110 | 105 | 6,144 | 3,531 |
| 2001 | 1,896 | 23 | 71 | N/A | N/A | 6,744 | 80 | 94 | 113 | 5,757 | 3,273 |
| 2000 | 1,853 | 20 | 70 | N/A | N/A | 6,758 | 72 | 76 | 117 | 5,725 | 3,241 |
| 1999 | 1,802 | N/A | N/A | N/A | N/A | 6,613 | N/A | N/A | 255 | 5,663 | 3,007 |
| 1998 | 1,638 | N/A | N/A | N/A | N/A | 6,782 | N/A | N/A | 247 | 5,629 | 3,038 |
| 1997 | 1,434 | N/A | N/A | N/A | N/A | 6,787 | N/A | N/A | 210 | 5,518 | 2,913 |
| 1996 | 1,380 | N/A | N/A | N/A | N/A | 6,964 | N/A | N/A | 216 | 5,630 | 2,930 |
| 1995 | 1,381 | N/A | N/A | N/A | N/A | 7,058 | N/A | N/A | 211 | 5,619 | 3,031 |
| 1994 | 1,309 | N/A | N/A | N/A | N/A | 6,839 | N/A | N/A | 162 | 5,408 | 2,902 |
| 1993 | 1,256 | N/A | N/A | N/A | N/A | 6,550 | N/A | N/A | 141 | 5,204 | 2,743 |
| 1992 | 1,144 | N/A | N/A | N/A | N/A | 6,458 | N/A | N/A | 115 | 4,945 | 2,772 |
| 1991 | 1,106 | N/A | N/A | N/A | N/A | 6,293 | N/A | N/A | 122 | 4,873 | 2,648 |
| 1990 | 969 | N/A | N/A | N/A | N/A | 5,967 | N/A | N/A | 136 | 4,498 | 2,574 |
| 1989 | 1,022 | N/A | N/A | N/A | N/A | 6,120 | N/A | N/A | 110 | 4,550 | 2,702 |
| 1988 | 976 | N/A | N/A | N/A | N/A | 5,650 | N/A | N/A | 84 | 4,192 | 2,518 |
| 1987 | 852 | N/A | N/A | N/A | N/A | 5,463 | N/A | N/A | 81 | 3,920 | 2,476 |
| 1986 | 777 | N/A | N/A | N/A | N/A | 5,303 | N/A | N/A | 61 | 3,670 | 2,471 |
| 1985 | 750 | N/A | N/A | N/A | N/A | 5,207 | N/A | N/A | 23 | 3,488 | 2,492 |
| 1984 | 804 | N/A | N/A | N/A | N/A | 5,403 | N/A | N/A | 43 | 3,647 | 2,603 |
| 1983 | 748 | N/A | N/A | N/A | N/A | 5,547 | N/A | N/A | 56 | 3,678 | 2,673 |
| 1982 | 772 | N/A | N/A | N/A | N/A | 5,242 | N/A | N/A | 36 | 3,432 | 2,618 |
| 1981 | 811 | N/A | N/A | N/A | N/A | 4,819 | N/A | N/A | 30 | 3,283 | 2,377 |
| 1980 | 770 | N/A | N/A | N/A | N/A | 4,501 | N/A | N/A | 30 | 3,115 | 2,156 |
| 1979 | 796 | N/A | N/A | N/A | N/A | 4,234 | N/A | N/A | 21 | 3,001 | 2,050 |
| 1978 | 782 | N/A | N/A | N/A | N/A | 4,323 | N/A | N/A | 14 | 2,954 | 2,165 |
| 1977 | 717 | N/A | N/A | N/A | N/A | 4,810 | N/A | N/A | 9 | 3,119 | 2,417 |
| 1976 | 581 | N/A | N/A | N/A | N/A | 4,767 | N/A | N/A | 18 | 2,881 | 2,485 |

West Georgia Wolves logo.

== Athletics ==
The athletics program fields men's intercollegiate teams in baseball, basketball, cross country, football, and golf and women's teams in basketball, beach volleyball, cross country, golf, soccer, softball, tennis, track, indoor volleyball, and competition cheerleading. All intercollegiate sports are affiliated with NCAA Division I as a member of the Atlantic Sun Conference (ASUN). The football team plays in the United Athletic Conference (UAC), currently a football-only alliance between the ASUN and Western Athletic Conference (WAC). In 2026, the UAC will become an all-sports conference as a rebranded WAC, with West Georgia joining the expanded UAC. In 2006, amid the Native American mascot controversy, the UWG changed its athletic nickname from the "Braves" to the "Wolves."

== Notable faculty ==
- Newt Gingrich, history professor (1970–1978), speaker of the U.S. House of Representatives (1995–1999), candidate for president of the United States in 2012.
