= Ernest M. Henley =

American atomic and nuclear physicist

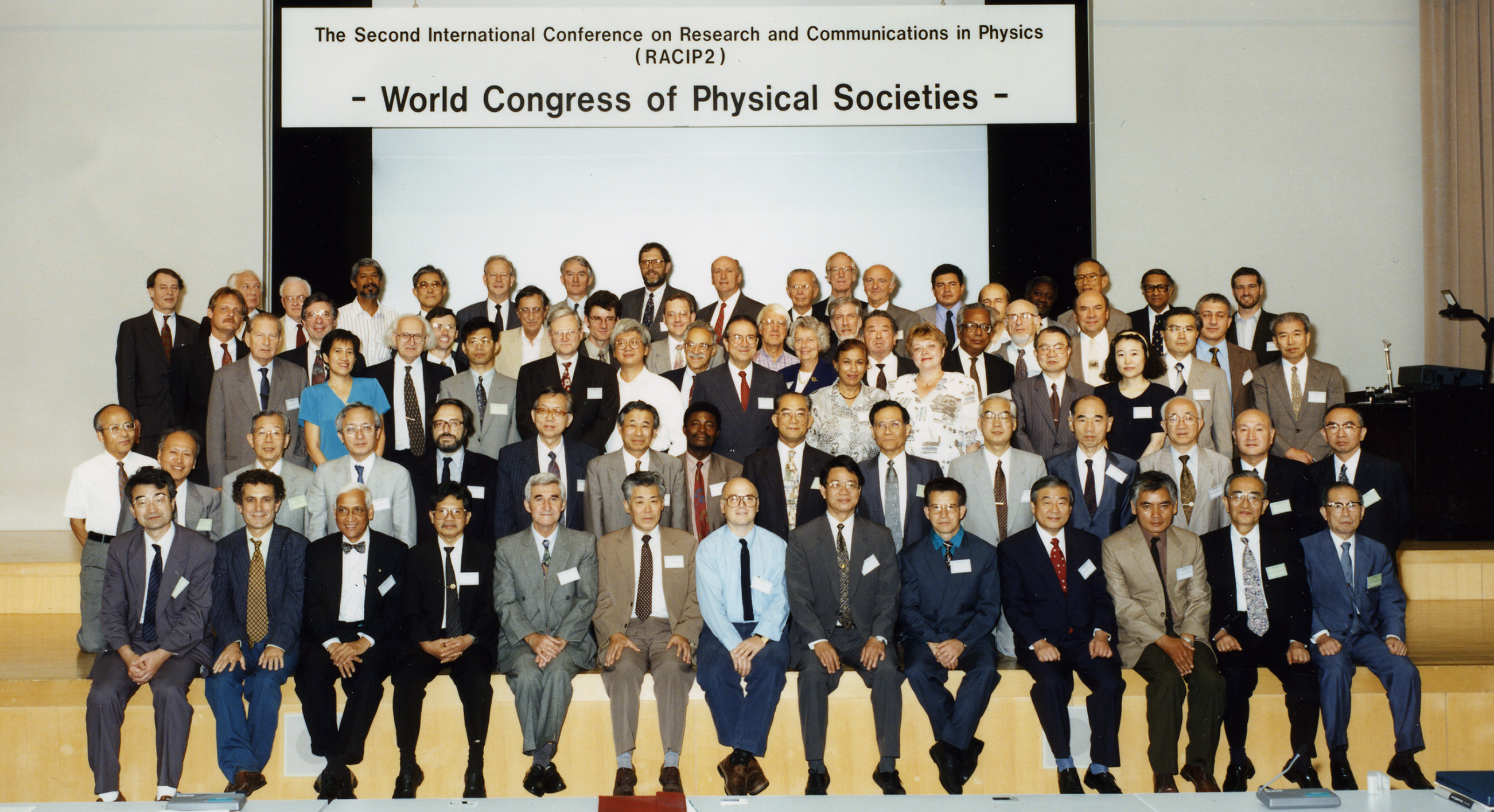
- Henley at the Second International Conference on Research and Communications in Physics
- Born: 10 June 1924; Frankfurt am Main, Germany
- Died: 27 March 2017 (aged 92)
- Education: City College of New York; University of California, Berkeley
- Awards: Tom W. Bonner Prize in Nuclear Physics
- Scientific career
- Fields: Nuclear physics
- Workplaces: Stanford University; Columbia University; University of Washington
- Thesis: Π-Meson Production by Protons on Nuclei (1952)
- Doctoral advisor: Kenneth M. Watson

Ernest Mark Henley (June 10, 1924 – March 27, 2017) was an American atomic and nuclear physicist.

In 1944 Henley received a B.E.E. in electrical engineering from the City College of New York. From 1944 to 1946, he served in the U.S. Navy, decommissioning and repairing electrical equipment on ships and submarines. He worked at the Airborne Instruments Laboratory as an electrical engineer from 1946 to 1948. Between 1950 and 1951 he worked at Stanford University, and received a Ph.D. from UC Berkeley in 1952. From 1952 to 1954, he was a Jewett Fellow and lecturer at Columbia University. In 1954, Henley accepted a faculty position at the University of Washington where he remained for his entire career, serving as Dean of the College of Arts and Sciences between 1979 and 1987.

Over the course of his research career, Henley studied symmetries in nuclear physics. From 1979 to 1987 he was Dean of the College of Arts and Sciences there and Director of the Institute for Theoretical Nuclear Physics in 1990-1991. He was Professor Emeritus since 1995. He dedicated his retirement to teaching Physics at the University of Washington's Transition School and Early Entrance Program, the Robinson Center for Young Scholars. In 2014 at the age of 90 Henley retired from this position.

In 1979 he was elected a member of the National Academy of Sciences. In 1992 he was president of the American Physical Society, where he chaired the Nuclear Physics section from 1979 to 1980. In 1989 he received the Tom W. Bonner prize in nuclear physics. In 2005 he received an honorary Dr. rer. nat. in physics from the Justus-Liebig-Universität Gießen, Germany.

== Publications ==
- with Walter Thirring: Elementare Quantenfeldtheorie, BI Verlag 1975 (English original: Elementary Quantum Field Theory, McGraw Hill 1962)
- with Hans Frauenfelder: Nuclear and Particle Physics, Benjamin 1975
- with Hans Frauenfelder: Subatomic Physics, Prentice-Hall 1974, 2nd edn. 1991, (in German): Teilchen und Kerne: Subatomare Physik, Oldenbourg 1979, 4th edn. 1999
