= Henry Lewis (baseball) =

American baseball player

- Outfielder
- Threw: Left

Negro league baseball debut
- 1943, for the Atlanta Black Crackers

Last appearance
- 1943, for the Atlanta Black Crackers

Teams
- Atlanta Black Crackers (1943)

Henry N. Lewis is an American former Negro league outfielder and manager who played in the 1940s.

Lewis played for the Atlanta Black Crackers in 1943, and also managed the team that season. In three recorded games as a player, he posted two hits in 11 plate appearances.
