= Harry S. Lewis =

English author and communal worker

Harry Samuel Lewis (Hebrew: שמואל בן דב לואיס; 1861 – 27 April 1940) was an English author and communal worker of Jewish extraction. He was born in London in 1861; educated at King's College School and St. John's College, Cambridge (B.A. 1884). At Cambridge he was one of the earliest to take honors in the Semitic languages tripos (1886) and was Hebrew scholar at his college. After leaving college he took residence at Toynbee Hall, Whitechapel, and devoted himself to social work among the Jews of the East End. In connection with this he published, with E. J. Russel, The Jew in London (London, 1900). He edited The Targum on Isaiah I-V, with Commentary (London: Truebner & Co., 1889).
