= Harry Lewis (Australian footballer) =

Australian rules footballer

Personal information
- Full name: Henry Edward Pamplin Lewis
- Born: 5 June 1880; Carlton, Victoria
- Died: 29 October 1946 (aged 66); Parkville, Victoria
- Original team: Montague Juniors

Playing career^{1}
Years	Club	Games (Goals)
1899	Carlton	4 (2)
- ^{1} Playing statistics correct to the end of 1899.

Henry Edward Pamplin Lewis (5 June 1880 – 29 October 1946) was an Australian rules footballer who played with Carlton in the Victorian Football League (VFL).
