= UW Academy for Young Scholars =

Coordinates: 47.654404°N 122.311682°W

UW Academy for Young Scholars is an early-college entrance program for 10th graders seeking admission to the University of Washington in Seattle.

Founded in 2001, after the creation of Early Entrance Program (EEP), the Robinson Center and the University of Washington Honors Program partnered to create the UW Academy for Young Scholars program. The first class of academy students enrolled at the university in 2002.

Each Spring, the program accepts around 35 - 40 current 10th grade students, who upon acceptance enroll as freshmen at the University of Washington in lieu of their last two years of high school. Selection is based on high school grades and curriculum, standardized test scores (ACT examination or SAT Reasoning Test), required essays, and teacher recommendations. The UW Academy is not a Running Start program, and Academy students do not earn a high school diploma as a result of fully withdrawing from high school.

Students enter the UW Academy through the Bridge Program, which is designed to ease the transition from 10th grade to university. Bridge begins with Academy Camp, an overnight camp where students in the program have a chance to meet with one another, older Academy students, and the staff. During this Bridge Week, students attend workshops on college student skills.

Students in the program begin Fall Quarter with two required Academy courses: A FIG, or First Year Interest Group, and first year seminar for Academy students. The goal of these courses is to smooth the transition from high school to college and give students an opportunity to bond and develop college-level study skills. Apart from these two required courses, students are free to choose courses that interest them.

== Notable alumni ==
- Armon Dadgar, co-founder of Hashi Corp
