= Henry Jackson Lewis =

American cartoonist

H.J. Lewis
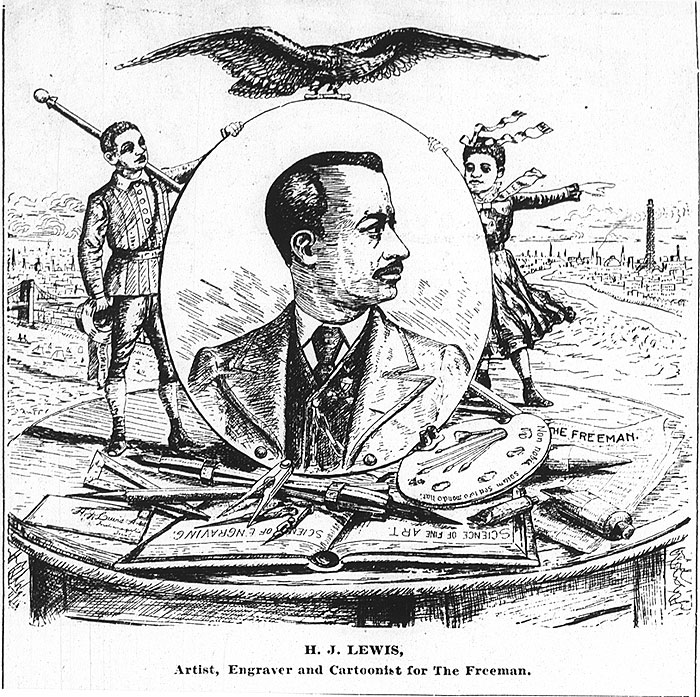
- Self Portrait
- Born: Henry Jackson Lewis c. 1857; Water Valley, Mississippi
- Died: 1891 (aged 33–34)
- Known for: Being the first African-American political cartoonist
- Notable work: The Freeman
- Spouse: Lavinia Dixon

Henry Jackson Lewis (c. 1857-April 1891) was the first African-American political cartoonist.

== Early and Family Life ==
Henry Jackson Lewis, "H.J.", was born a slave, around 1857, near Water Valley, the seat of Yalobusha County, Mississippi.

When he was a boy, he fell into a fire, which left his left eye blind and his left hand crippled. As an adult, his seared skin twisted and he wore an eye-patch, making him look "as odd, in appearance, as any character Dickens gave to the world."

He was self-educated, never attending school a day in his life. He was known to be "remarkably bright."

In 1872, Lewis settled in Pine Bluff, Arkansas, where he worked as a laborer, and married Lavinia Dixon. He and Lavinia had seven children: John, Richard, Lillian, Elizabeth, Chester, Henry W., and Francine Louise.

== Career ==
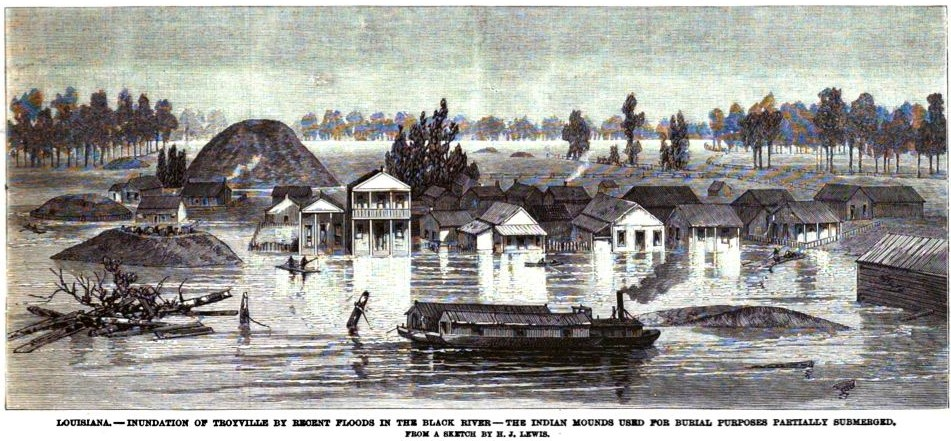
H.J. Lewis sketches in Frank Leslie’s Illustrated Newspaper. Apr. 21, 1883

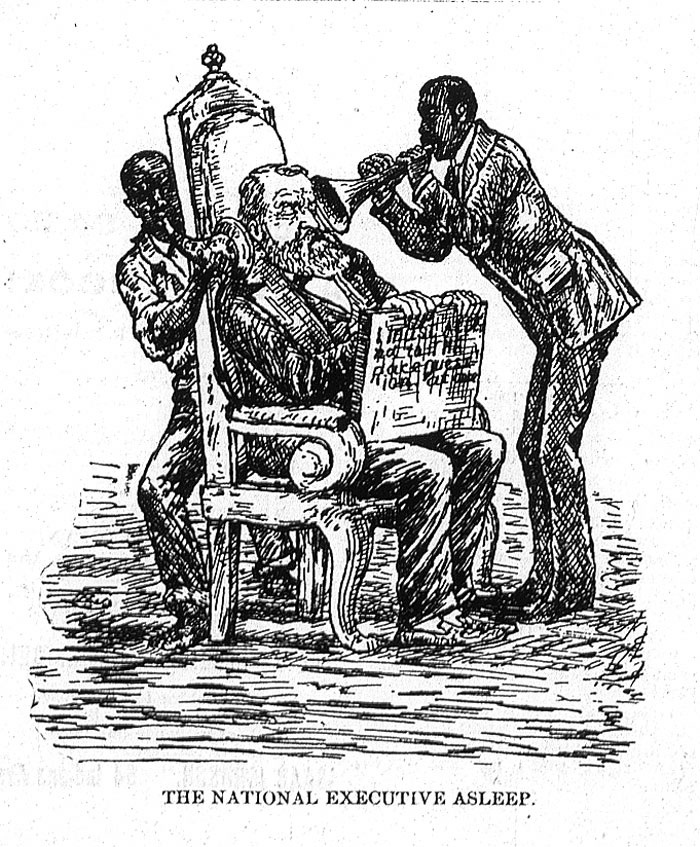
"The National Executive Asleep" - Indianapolis Freeman, by H.J. Lewis. Oct. 19, 1889.

The oldest known cartoons by H. J. Lewis were published in 1872. By 1879, H.J. was working as a freelance artist, selling drawings of city scenes, Arkansas River scenes, and Mississippi floodwaters to national publications such as Harper’s Weekly. In 1882, a Pine Bluff Commercial article praised his work, calling him an artist whose sketches, of both imaginary and real scenes, were "wonderfully correct,” and projecting a “brilliant and successful future” for him.

In November 1882, Dr. Edward Palmer of the Smithsonian Institution, ventured to the south to study prehistoric Native American land mounds as well as maps of Arkansas, Tennessee, and Louisiana. Palmer hired Lewis as an assistant. Lewis went on expeditions with Palmer to Avondale Mounds, near Greenville, Mississippi, where he sketched a large body of mound surveys. Lewis's drawings were published in Frank Leslie’s Illustrated Newspaper, and helped to disproved the theory that the mounds were built by a "lost race" of non-Indian "Mound Builders, " though he did not receive formal acknowledgment for his work until nearly 100 years after he completed it.

Around 1885, due to sparse available work, Lewis became a porter for the Arkansas Gazette. While working there, he learned some artistic techniques from the staff engravers. During that time, he also occasionally contracted his cartoons out to Puck and Judge magazines.

In January 1889, Lewis moved from Pine Bluff to Indianapolis, Indiana. There, he began working for The Freeman, the first national African American illustrated newspaper.

Lewis was skilled in wood engraving, mechanical drawing, freehand drawing, India-ink work and chalk work. Due to his work at The Freeman, Lewis became known as the first black political cartoonist.

Lewis' early work for The Freeman covered various topics, particularly around race i.e. lynching. However, the most common theme of his cartoons included biting criticism on President Benjamin Harrison and his Republican administration, for failing to support job opportunities for blacks, and on politicians' general refusal to acknowledge the importance of racism. His cartoon of Harrison, unconscious and sitting on a throne, as black men blared bugles at him, sparked controversy, especially in Indiana where Harrison had been U.S. Senator before being elected President.

Following the Harrison drawing, Lewis' cartoons disappeared from The Freeman for about a year. It is suspected that the economic pressures of The Freeman forced him to steer away from political drawings, as when his works reappeared, they were only humorous or general commentary about race relations, with exception of two illustrations that were indirectly critical of Harrison in December 1890 and January 1891.

In what was his final work, Lewis – a Christian – drew an architectural drawing of St. Paul A.M.E. Church in St. Louis, which was published in The Freeman on March 28, 1891. By the time of his death, he had given up any hope for true racial justice.

== Death ==
Lewis died April 9 or 10, 1891. The cause of death, on his death certificate, was given as "pneumanitus." According to the Indianapolis Journal, when he died, he was about 35 years old.

== Legacy ==
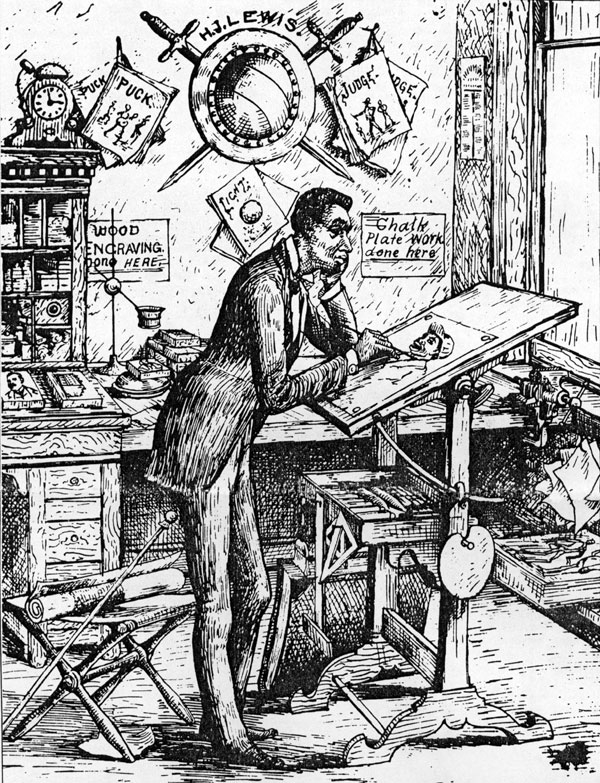
Henry Jackson Lewis in the offices of The Freeman in Indianapolis, c. 1890

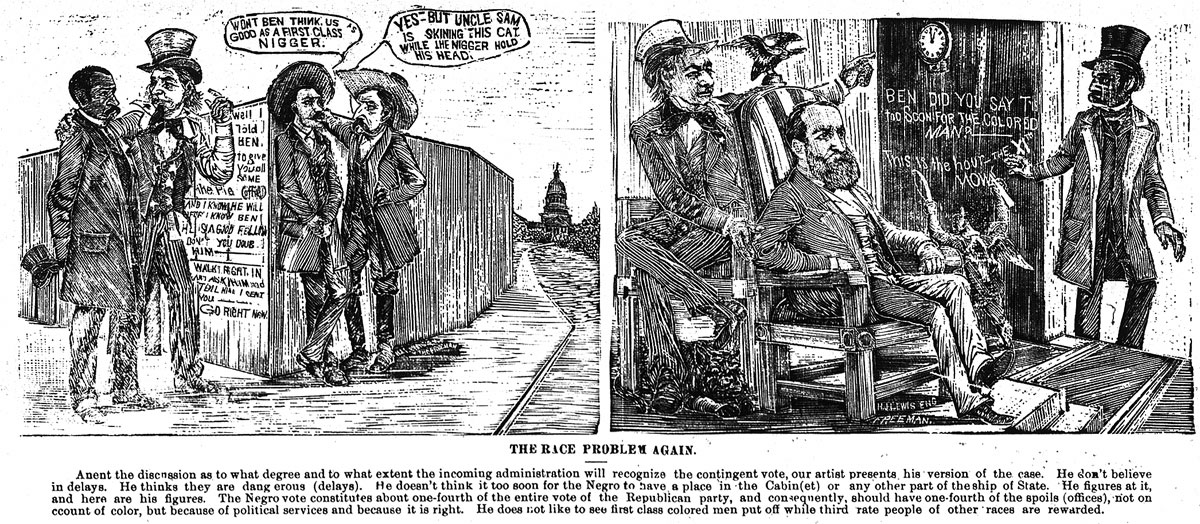
"The Race Problem Again" by H.J. Lewis. June 2, 1889

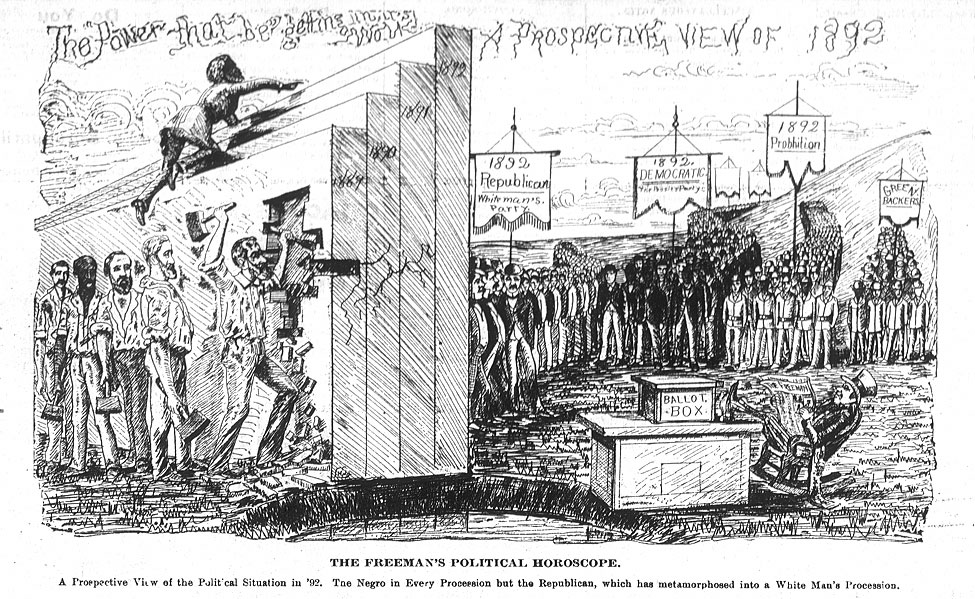
"The Freeman's Political Horoscope," by H.J. Lewis. Aug. 3, 1889

After Lewis's death, obituaries lauded him and his work. The Indianapolis Journal wrote of him, " He [had] no education, except that he could read and write yet his proficiency with the pencil and burin was something remarkable. His idea of form was excellent, and he had little trouble to rapidly reproduce anything that came under his observation. He was far from being attractive in personal appearance...Yet he was a genius, and with proper direction might have made his way in the world." The Indianapolis News remarked that he "stood toward the head of the colored artists of the country." The Freeman’s tribute of him concluded with:

"Mr. Lewis, in many respects, was a remarkable man, and had his lines been cast in different places, and his earlier years been spent under different skies, surrounded by other influences and aids, the space he would have filled in the world’s notice might have been one that biography would not have spurned, and without the record of which, future encyclopedias would be incomplete. As a portrayer of southern Negro life and a certain phaze of “white trash” existence, he had no living master. In this respect he was a genius, and when his equal shall come to us again, we do not know. Indeed, the only fault that could be found with Mr. Lewis’ work in this line, was that he builded too well, for so realistic were his sketches that the fine sensitiveness of the race was frequently aroused and offended...It were but simple charity to hope that it is well with him today, and that death was but an aperture through which his feverish and worn spirit took its way to spheres of higher mysteries, and a completer life, where conditions may not interfere, or man’s narrowness or unfair hatred prevent the full expression of his unique and striking gifts."

Despite his inclusion at the Smithsonian, mention of Lewis is absent from most art history knowledge. However, more of his work has been unearthed by today's artists. Noted African American sculptor, Garland Martin Taylor, said of Lewis's work:

"...every single inch of the canvas has meaning. There's not a wasted stroke. It's like he's documenting something and there's a reason for each drawing....Art, as Lewis knew so well, is never just about style but meaning."
