= Phase-space wavefunctions =

Phase-space representation of quantum state vectors is a formulation of quantum mechanics elaborating the phase-space formulation with a Hilbert space. It "is obtained within the framework of the relative-state formulation. For this purpose, the Hilbert space of a quantum system is enlarged by introducing an auxiliary quantum system. Relative-position state and relative-momentum state are defined in the extended Hilbert space of the composite quantum system and expressions of basic operators such as canonical position and momentum operators, acting on these states, are obtained." Thus, it is possible to assign a meaning to the wave function in phase space, $\psi(x,p,t)$, as a quasiamplitude, associated to a quasiprobability distribution.

The first wave-function approach of quantum mechanics in phase space was introduced by Torres-Vega and Frederick in 1990 (also see). It is based on a generalised Husimi distribution.

In 2004 Oliveira et al. developed a new wave-function formalism in phase space where the wave-function is associated to the Wigner quasiprobability distribution by means of the Moyal product. An advantage might be that off-diagonal Wigner functions used in superpositions are treated in an intuitive way, $\psi_1\star\psi_2$, also gauge theories are treated in an operator form.

== Phase space operators ==
Instead of thinking in terms multiplication of function using the star product, we can shift to think in terms of operators acting in functions in phase space.

Where for the Torres-Vega and Frederick approach the phase space operators are

$$\widehat{F}_{{}_\text{TV}}(\widehat{x},\widehat{p})=f\bigg(\frac{1}{2}x+i\hbar {\frac {\partial }{\partial p}},\;\frac {1}{2}}p-i\hbar {\frac {\partial }{\partial x}\bigg) ,$$

with

$$\widehat{x}_{{}_\text{TV}}=\frac{1}{2}x+i\hbar\frac{\partial}{\partial p} ,$$

and

$$\widehat{p\,}_{{}_\text{TV}}=\frac{1}{2}p-i\hbar\frac{\partial}{\partial x} .$$

And Oliveira's approach the phase space operators are

$$\widehat{F}_w=f(x,p)= f\star=\left(x+\tfrac{i \hbar}{2} \frac{\partial}{\partial p} , p - \tfrac{i \hbar}{2} \frac{\partial}{\partial x}\right)$$

with

$$\widehat{p\,}_w=p\star= p-i\frac{\hbar}{2}\partial_x ,$$
$$\widehat{x}_w=x\star=x+i\frac{\hbar}{2}\partial_p .$$

In the general case

$$\widehat{x}=\alpha x+i\beta\hbar\frac{\partial}{\partial p} ,$$

and

$$\widehat{p\,}=\gamma p+i\delta\hbar\frac{\partial}{\partial x} ,$$

with $\gamma\beta-\alpha\delta=1$, where $\alpha$, $\beta$, $\gamma$ and $\delta$ are constants.

These operators satisfy the uncertainty principle:

$$[\widehat{x},\widehat{p\,}]=i\hbar .$$

== Symplectic Hilbert space ==
To associate the Hilbert space, $\mathcal{H}$, with the phase space $\Gamma$, we will consider the set of complex functions of integrable square, $\psi(x,p)$ in $\Gamma$, such that

$$\int dp\,dx\, \psi^{\ast}(x,p)\psi(x,p) < \infty .$$

Then we can write $\psi(x,p)=\langle x,p|\psi\rangle$, with

$$\int dp\, dx\; |x,p\rangle\langle x,p| =1 ,$$

where $\langle\psi|$ is the dual vector of $|\psi\rangle$. This symplectic Hilbert space is denoted by $\mathcal{H}(\Gamma)$.

An association with the Schrödinger wavefunction can be made by

$\psi(q,p)=e^{-ixp/2\hbar}\int g(x')\phi(x+x')e^{-(i/\hbar)px'}dx'$,

letting $g(x')=\phi^*(-\frac{z}{2})$, we have

$\psi(q,p)=\int \phi(x-\frac{z}{2})\phi(x+\frac{z}{2})e^{-(i/\hbar)pz}dz$.

Then $\psi(x,p)\propto W(q,p)$.

=== Torres-Vega–Frederick representation ===
With the operators of position and momentum a Schrödinger picture is developed in phase space

$$i\hbar\frac{\partial}{\partial t}\psi(x,p,t)=\widehat{H}_{{}_\text{TV}}\psi(x,p,t) .$$

The Torres-Vega–Frederick distribution is

$$f_{{}_\text{TV}}=|\psi_{{}_\text{TV}}(q,p)|^2 .$$

=== Oliveira representation ===
Thus, it is now, with aid of the star product possible to construct a Schrödinger picture in phase space for $\psi(x,p)$

$$\psi(x,p,t)=e^{-\frac{i}{\hbar}H\star\,t}\psi(x,p) ,$$

deriving both side by $t$, we have

$$i\hbar\frac{\partial}{\partial t}\psi(x,p,t)=H\star\psi(x,p,t) ,$$

therefore, the above equation has the same role of Schrödinger equation in usual quantum mechanics.

To show that $W(x,p,t)=\psi(x,p,t)\star\psi^\dagger(x,p,t)$, we take the 'Schrödinger equation' in phase space and 'star-multiply' by the right for $\psi^\dagger(x,p,t)$

$$i\hbar\frac{\partial \psi}{\partial t}\star\psi^\dagger=H\star\psi\star\psi^\dagger ,$$

where $H$ is the classical Hamiltonian of the system. And taking the complex conjugate

$$-i\hbar\,\psi\star\frac{\partial \psi^\dagger}{\partial t}=\psi\star\psi^\dagger\star H ,$$

subtracting both equations we get

$$\frac{\partial}{\partial t}(\psi\star\psi^\dagger)=-\frac{1}{i\hbar}[(\psi\star\psi^\dagger)\star H-H\star(\psi\star\psi^\dagger)] ,$$

which is the time evolution of Wigner function, for this reason $\psi$ is sometimes called quasiamplitude of probability. The $\star$-genvalue is given by the time independent equation

$$H\star\psi=E\psi$$.

Star-multiplying for $\psi^\dagger(x,p,t)$ on the right, we obtain

$$H\star W= E\,W .$$

Therefore, the static Wigner distribution function is a $\star$-genfunction of the $\star$-genvalue equation, a result well known in the usual phase-space formulation of quantum mechanics.

In the case where $\psi(q,p)\propto W(q,p)$, worked in the beginning of the section, the Oliveira approach and phase-space formulation are indistinguishable, at least for pure states.

== Equivalence of representations ==
As it was states before, the first wave-function formulation of quantum mechanics was developed by Torres-Vega and Frederick, its phase-space operators are given by

$$\widehat{x}_{{}_\text{TV}}=\frac{1}{2}x+i\hbar\frac{\partial}{\partial p} ,$$

and

$$\widehat{p\,}_{{}_\text{TV}}=\frac{1}{2}p-i\hbar\frac{\partial}{\partial x} .$$

This operators are obtained transforming the operators $\bar{x}_{{}_\text{TV}}=x +i\hbar \frac{\partial}{\partial p}$ and $\bar{p}_{{}_\text{TV}}=-i\hbar\frac{\partial}{\partial q}$ (developed in the same article) as

$$U^{-1}\bar{x}_{{}_{TV}}U$$

and

$$U^{-1}\bar{p}_{{}_{TV}}U ,$$

where $U=\exp(i\frac{x\,p}{2\hbar})$.

This representation is some times associated with the Husimi distribution and it was shown to coincides with the totality of coherent-state representations for the Heisenberg–Weyl group.

The Wigner quasiamplitude, $\psi$, and Torres-Vega–Frederick wave-function, $\psi_{{}_\text{TV}}$, are related by

$$\begin{aligned}
\widehat{x}_{{}_\text{TV}}\psi_{{}_\text{TV}}=(2\widehat{x}_w\otimes\widehat{1})\psi_{w},\\
\widehat{p}_{{}_\text{TV}}\psi_{{}_\text{TV}}=(\widehat{1}\otimes\widehat{p}_w)\psi_{w},
\end{aligned}$$

where $\widehat{x}_w=x+\frac{i\hbar}{2}\partial_p$ and $\widehat{p}_w=p-\frac{i\hbar}{2}\partial_x$.

== See also ==
- Wigner quasiprobability distribution
- Husimi Q representation
- Quasiprobability distribution
- Phase-space formulation
