= Henry T. Lewis =

American judge (1847–1903)

Henry Thomas Lewis
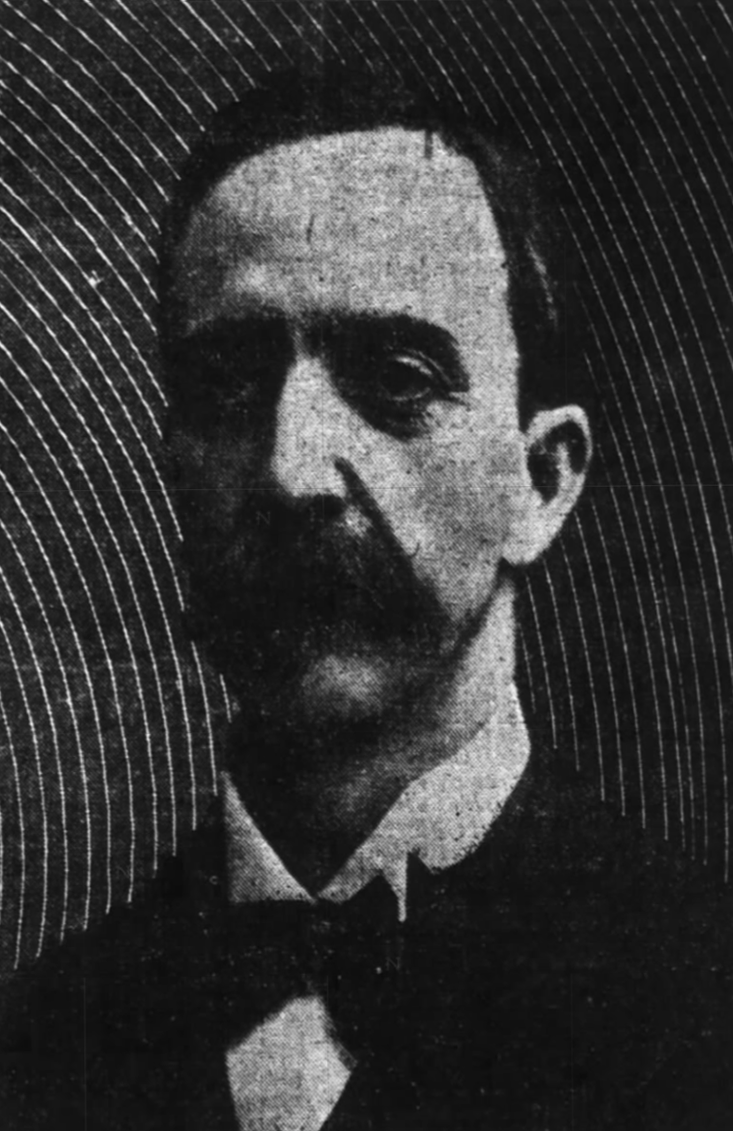

Associate Justice of the Supreme Court of Georgia
- In office 1897–1902
- Appointed by: William Yates Atkinson
- Preceded by: Spencer R. Atkinson
- Succeeded by: Samuel B. Adams

Personal details
- Born: October 21, 1847 Oxford, Georgia, U.S.
- Died: December 10, 1903 (aged 56) Greensboro, Georgia, U.S.
- Party: Democratic
- Spouse: Hattie Poulain Lewis
- Children: 3
- Education: Emory University

Henry Thomas "Hal" Lewis (October 21, 1847 – December 10, 1903) was a justice of the Supreme Court of Georgia from 1897 to 1902.

== Early life, education, and career ==
Born in Oxford, Newton County, Georgia, Lewis was the son of Colonel and Mrs. Miles W. Lewis. At the outbreak of the American Civil War, he was at the Georgia Military Institute, from which he went into the Army of the Confederacy, with the Georgia Cadets and remained until the close of the war. Lewis attended Oxford College of Emory University, from where he graduated with distinction in 1870. Following his early education, he taught at a school for two years at Clinton in Jones county, whilst studying law to gain admission to the bar in 1872. In 1873, he moved to Atlanta and began the practice of law, forming a law partnership with Judge Edgar H. Orr, and afterwards serving as assistant state school commissioner when Orr became the commissioner. Around 1877, Lewis moved back to Greensboro, Georgia, and practiced law there until his appointment to the supreme court bench in 1897.

Lewis became involved in Democratic Party politics, and was a delegate to the 1884 Democratic National Convention in Chicago, where Grover Cleveland was nominated for the presidency. Lewis was again a delegate to the 1896 Democratic National Convention, also in Chicago, where he made the nominating speech for William Jennings Bryan, who won the nomination. Lewis was "a prominent candidate" for nomination to the United States Senate that year.

== Judicial service ==
On November 17, 1897, Governor William Yates Atkinson appointed Lewis to fill a vacancy on the state supreme court. Lewis was thereafter elected for the full term of six years, and gained a reputation as one of the hardest-working judges on the bench. During the period of his service on the court, lynching was prevalent in the region, and in response to one case in which an African American man was lynched in the state after being accused of rape, Lewis wrote that the lynching occurred not because "the lynchers have less regard for law and order, but because they have more concern for the sanctity of home and the protection of its inmates."

The work that Lewis put into the position affected his health, and his pending resignation was announced in June 1902, following a series of issues that had necessitated taking breaks from the court.

== Personal life and death ==
On December 22, 1880, Lewis married Hattie Poulain of Greensboro, with whom he had two sons and one daughter.

Following his retirement from the court, Lewis "spent some time in the north in search of health and finally retired to his home in Greensboro".

He was in feeble health for the last few months of 1903, being "confined almost entirely to his room", until his death at his home in Greensboro, at the age of 56.

Political offices
Preceded by Newly reconfigured court	Justice of the Supreme Court of Georgia; 1897–1902	Succeeded by Samuel B. Adams
