= Transition School and Early Entrance Program =

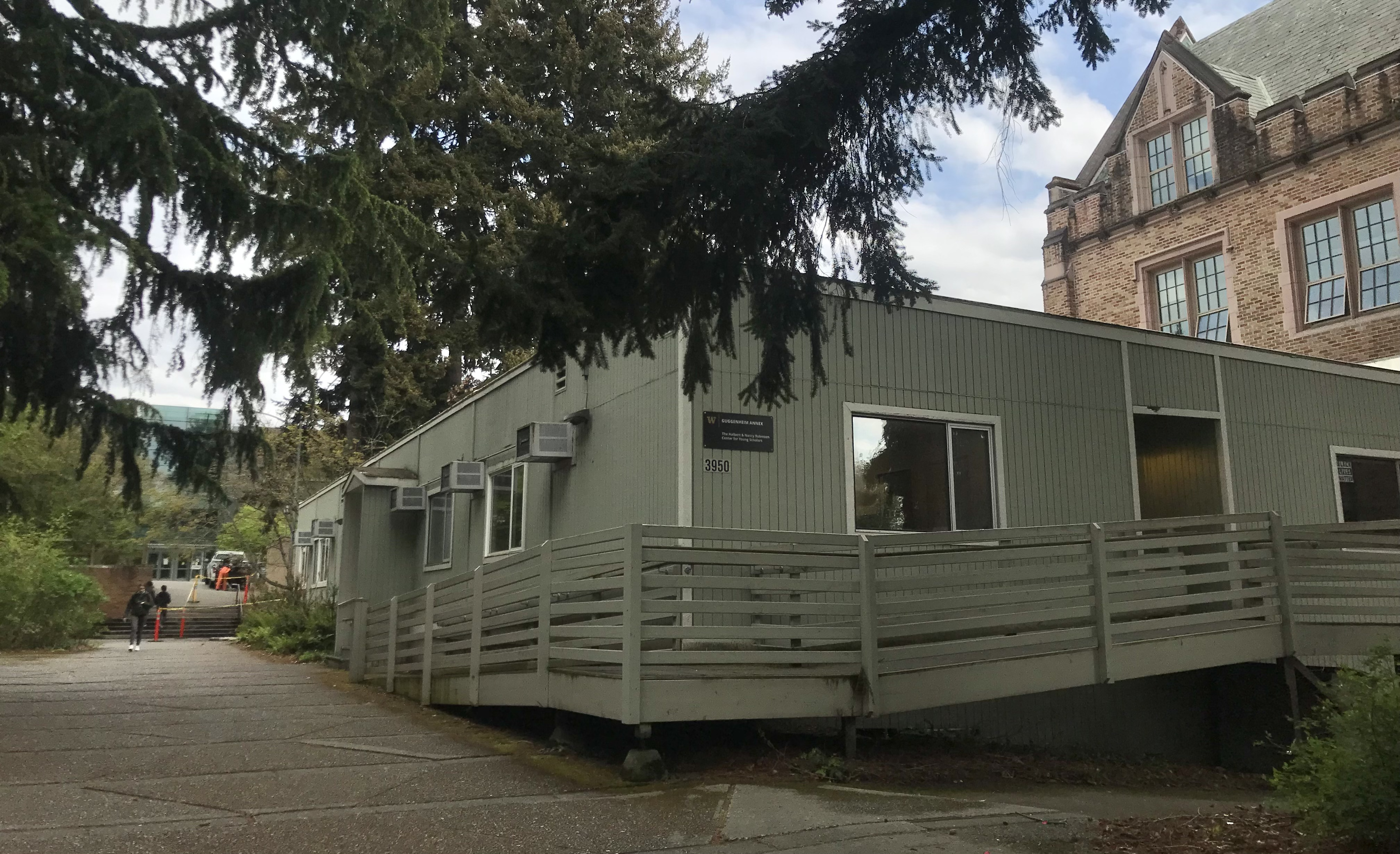
The Guggenheim Annex on the University of Washington campus, where the Robinson Center for Young Scholars is located.

The Transition School and Early Entrance Program (TS and EEP) are two subsequent programs comprising the original early entrance track at the University of Washington's Halbert and Nancy Robinson Center for Young Scholars. The one-year Transition School prepares students to enter the university as fully matriculated undergraduates in the equivalent of their ninth-grade year. Students apply during their eighth grade year and begin TS the following autumn, leaving the K-12 school system. Each year, a small cohort of students is accepted from a larger applicant pool. While at TS, students take advanced, college-level courses in mathematics, science, and the humanities.

== History ==
The Early Entrance Program (EEP) was created in 1977 by the late Halbert Robinson, a professor of developmental psychology at the University of Washington. The goal of the EEP from its inception was to enable a small and carefully selected group of academically advanced middle school students to accelerate into post-secondary education at a pace equal to their intellectual development. Nancy Robinson, a professor of psychiatry and behavioral sciences at the University of Washington, assumed directorship of the Center following Halbert Robinson’s death in 1981, stewarding the Center until her retirement in 2000. In 2001, the Robinson Center and the University of Washington Honors Program co-created the UW Academy for Young Scholars for academically advanced high school students to attend the university after their sophomore year. The Robinson Center was originally located in the Guthrie Annex, but relocated to the Guggenheim Annex in 2019. The Washington Search for Young Scholars was created in 2003 to identify and work with Washington’s most capable students, their families, and schools to develop more opportunities for academically gifted young people.

== Academics ==
=== Admissions process ===
The Transition School accepts 15–20 students every year. Applicants are required to submit three teacher recommendations, middle school transcripts, an essay based on a given prompt, and an ACT score. The program receives 1,000 - 1,200 applicants per year, which are narrowed down by a series of one-on-one interviews with each prospective student.

=== Curriculum ===
During the one-year Transition School program, TS students (TSers) take advanced, college-level courses. In the autumn and winter quarters, TSers take courses in mathematics (precalculus), English, biology, and history. Each of these classes meet for around five hours every week of the quarter. The biology course is reduced to a seminar during spring quarter, with classes occurring for one to two hours every week. In the 2022, the Transition School removed the spring quarter class and moved the "U-ready" seminar, designed to prepare students for college expectations, from winter to spring quarter.

The Transition School curriculum is designed to cover the most important aspects of high school and prepare students for entrance into university. TS courses are taught by instructors with doctorates or other postgraduate degrees in their fields. The courses are fast-paced and accelerated, and cover concepts in-depth. TS also focuses on teaching students scholarly skills including time management to prepare them for university courses.

Prior to 2022, TS students also participated in a mentorship program in which they were matched with a mentor from the Early Entrance Program.

=== Assessment ===
Students receive quarterly progress reports containing numerical assessments as well as feedback from instructors. At the end of the academic year, instructors and TS administration decide whether each student advances to the Early Entrance Program (EEP). In unusual circumstances in which students have not met academic standards or have not acquired scholarly skills necessary to thrive at university, a decision is sometimes made to not advance a student to EEP, in which case students must return to high school or their regular schooling program.

== Controversies ==
In 2019, the University of Washington published a statement announcing the termination of John Sahr, a professor in the Department of Electrical and Computer Engineering, who served as interim director of the Robinson Center for Young Scholars from 2008 to 2010. The University's investigation "found inappropriate conduct with students, including a 17-year-old undergraduate who was associated with the Robinson Center."

In December of 2019, the University of Washington's student news publication, The Daily of the University of Washington, published an article alleging that the Robinson Center fostered a misogynistic and toxic environment for students. Former Transition School students who spoke to reporters at the publication claimed that they experienced bullying and sexual harassment by male students and teaching assistants, and that the Robinson Center administration ignored their complaints. The director of the Robinson Center responded with a statement saying that the allegations were "deeply concerning" and that the Robinson Center would undergo a full review of the Transition School program with the office of the Dean of Undergraduate Academic Affairs at UW.

Following the allegations against the Robinson Center published in The Daily, Nancy Hertzog left the Center in 2020 after ten years of being the director. A new principal was also hired for the Transition School program.

== Notable alumni and faculty ==
Physicist Ernest M. Henley was formerly a Transition School physics instructor. Elizabeth Angell, a former Transition School student, is a Rhodes scholar. Emmett Shear, a former Transition School student, is the CEO of Twitch.

In 2003, the Robinson Center for Young Scholars received the Brotman Award for Instructional Excellence from the University of Washington. There have been three Rhodes scholars and one Rhodes finalist from the Early Entrance Program.

== See also ==
- University of Washington
- UW Academy for Young Scholars
