= 2024 Georgia judicial elections =

- May 21, 2024

The 2024 Georgia judicial elections were held on May 21, 2024 on four Supreme Court of Georgia seats that were up for election for a six-year term. Of these four, only the seat held by Andrew Pinson was contested by former Democratic U.S. House member John Barrow. Justices Michael Boggs, John Ellington and Nels Peterson were unopposed for re-election.

Seven seats on the Georgia Court of Appeals were being up for election on May 21, of these seven, only the seat held by justice M. Yvette Miller, (who decided not to run for re-election) was contested between Jeff Davis and Tabitha Ponder. Justices Stephen Dillard, Ken Hodges, Benjamin Land, Amanda Mercier, Brian Rickman, and Jeffrey Watkins were unopposed for re-election.

Since 1896, justices on the Supreme Court and judges on the Court of Appeals have been directly elected in statewide elections. Judicial elections were made non-partisan in 1983. Elections for nonpartisan state judgeships have been held on the date of the legislative primary since 2012, and were previously held on the general election ballot in November during even-numbered years.

== Court of Appeals ==
=== Miller's seat ===
Justice M. Yvette Miller, who was appointed in 1999 by Democratic governor Roy Barnes retired, which made the seat open. Conservative candidate Jeff Davis defeated liberal candidate Tabitha Ponder with 57.0% of the vote.

==== Results ====
Final results by county: Davis: 50–60%; 60–70%; 70–80%; 80–90%; Ponder: 50–60%; 60–70%; 70–80%

2024 Georgia Jeff Davis's Court of Appeals election
Party	Candidate	Votes	%
Nonpartisan	Jeff Davis	630,089	57.02%
Nonpartisan	Tabitha Ponder	474,950	42.98%
Total votes		1,105,039	100.00%

=== Dillard's seat ===
2024 Georgia (Dillard's seat) Court of Appeals election
Party	Candidate	Votes	%
Nonpartisan	Stephen Dillard (incumbent)	1,041,332	100.00%
Total votes		1,041,332	100.00%

=== Hodges's seat ===
2024 Georgia (Hodges's seat) Court of Appeals election
Party	Candidate	Votes	%
Nonpartisan	Ken Hodges (incumbent)	1,043,661	100.00%
Total votes		1,043,661	100.00%

=== Land's seat ===
2024 Georgia (Land's seat) Court of Appeals election
Party	Candidate	Votes	%
Nonpartisan	Benjamin A. Land (incumbent)	1,035,509	100.00%
Total votes		1,035,509	100.00%

=== Mercier's seat ===
2024 Georgia (Mercier's seat) Court of Appeals election
Party	Candidate	Votes	%
Nonpartisan	Amanda H. Mercier (incumbent)	1,038,811	100.00%
Total votes		1,038,811	100.00%

=== Rickman's seat ===
2024 Georgia (Rickman's seat) Court of Appeals election
Party	Candidate	Votes	%
Nonpartisan	Brian M. Rickman (incumbent)	1,031,763	100.00%
Total votes		1,031,763	100.00%

=== Watkin's seat ===
2024 Georgia (Watkins's seat) Court of Appeals election
Party	Candidate	Votes	%
Nonpartisan	Jeffrey A. Watkins (incumbent)	1,033,036	100.00%
Total votes		1,033,036	100.00%

== Supreme Court ==
=== Pinson's seat ===
Justice Andrew Pinson, who was appointed in 2022 by Republican governor Brian Kemp to succeed David Nahmias, was challenged by former Democratic member of the U.S. House John Barrow. Pinson defeated John Barrow with 55.0% of the vote.

Pinson performed very well statewide, most notably in Metro Atlanta, while Barrow performed well in Georgia's 12th congressional district, where he used to represent in the House of Representatives. Despite the margin, the result was the most competitive two-way election for Supreme Court since 2020, when incumbent Charlie Bethel defeated Beth Beskin 52.2 to 47.8, as well as the second most competitive since judicial elections made nonpartisan in 1983.

==== Endorsements ====
Andrew Pinson

Statewide officials

- Brian Kemp, Governor of Georgia (2019–present)
- John F. King, Insurance Commissioner of Georgia (2019-present)

Organizations

- Georgia Chamber of Commerce
John Barrow

Organizations

- Planned Parenthood Southeast
- Reproductive Freedom for All
- Fair Fight

==== Results ====
Final results by county: Pinson: 50–60%; 60–70%; 70–80%; Barrow: 50–60%; 60–70%; 70–80%; Tie: 50%

2024 Georgia (Pinson's seat) Supreme Court election
Party	Candidate	Votes	%
Nonpartisan	Andrew Pinson (incumbent)	643,131	54.98%
Nonpartisan	John Barrow	526,640	45.02%
Total votes		1,169,771	100.00%

==== Background ====
John Barrow previously campaigned in 2019 and 2020 to succeed retiring justice Robert Benham, but the election was canceled by Kemp's appointment of Carla Wong McMillian to fill Benham's remaining term. Barrow also campaigned to succeed Keith R. Blackwell in 2020, but that election was similarly cancelled by Kemp's appointment of Shawn Ellen LaGrua, and again with the appointment of Verda Colvin to succeed retiring justice Harold Melton in 2021. Finally, in 2022, Kemp cancelled a potential election by appointing Pinson to succeed Nahmias. Barrow, along with fellow candidate Beth Beskin, unsuccessfully sued in state court to challenge the law allowing for cancellations of judicial elections following the appointment of LaGrua.

=== Boggs's seat ===
2024 Georgia (Boggs's seat) Supreme Court election
Party	Candidate	Votes	%
Nonpartisan	Michael P. Boggs (incumbent)	1,045,866	100.00%
Total votes		1,045,866	100.00%

=== Ellington's seat ===
2024 Georgia (Ellington's seat) Supreme Court election
Party	Candidate	Votes	%
Nonpartisan	John J. Ellington (incumbent)	1,046,368	100.00%
Total votes		1,046,368	100.00%

=== Peterson's seat ===
2024 Georgia (Peterson's seat) Supreme Court election
Party	Candidate	Votes	%
Nonpartisan	Nels S. D. Peterson (incumbent)	1,037,234	100.00%
Total votes		1,037,234	100.00%
