= 2020 Georgia state elections =

2020 Georgia elections
- November 3, 2020; January 5, 2021

Several elections took place in the U.S state of Georgia in 2020. The general election was held on November 3, 2020, and the runoff on January 5, 2021. A combined partisan primary for president and all other offices on the ballot was held on June 9, 2020, with a primary runoff held on August 11.

To vote by mail, registered Georgia voters must have requested a ballot by October 30, 2020. By early October some 1,589,147 voters requested mail ballots. Following the November 3, 2020 general election, voters whose mail-in ballots were rejected could make corrections ("cure") until 5 p.m. on Friday, November 6, 2020.

== Federal offices ==
=== President of the United States ===
Georgia had 16 electoral votes in the Electoral College. Democrat Joe Biden won all of them with 49.5% of the popular vote. It was the first time a Democratic presidential candidate had won Georgia since Bill Clinton in 1992.

=== United States House of Representatives ===
==== General ====
Georgia had 14 seats in the United States House of Representatives which were up for election. The Republicans won 8 while the Democrats won 6. Democrats gained one seat, the 7th district.

==== Special ====
A special election was held for the 5th district due to the death of the incumbent John Lewis. The first round was held on September 29 and the runoff was held on December 1. Democrat Kwanza Hall won the seat.

=== United States Senate ===
==== General ====
Incumbent Republican David Perdue, first elected in 2014, lost his reelection bid to challenger Jon Ossoff. Perdue won the first round with 49.73% of the vote, but in the runoff election lost to Ossoff's 50.61% vote share.

==== Special ====
Following the resignation of Senator Johny Isakson in 2019, Governor Brian Kemp appointed Kelly Loeffler to serve out the term. Republican senator Loeffler then went on to come second in the first round with 25.9% of the vote while Democratic pastor Raphael Warnock won with 32.9%. Warnock went on to win in the runoff with 51.04% of the vote, becoming the first black senator to represent Georgia.

== Public Service Commission ==
Elections were held for Public Service Commission districts 1 and 4. While Republican incumbent appointee Jason Shaw defeated Democrat Robert Bryant for District 1, Republican incumbent Lauren "Bubba" McDonald was forced into a runoff against Democrat Daniel Blackman for District 4. McDonald defeated Blackman in the runoff held in January 2021.

== General Assembly ==
All 56 seats in the Georgia State Senate and 180 seats in the Georgia House of Representatives were up for election. Democrats filed for the largest number of seats in the State House since 1992 and the largest number of seats in the State Senate since 2004.

=== Georgia State Senate ===
Party	Before	After	Change
Republican	35	34	▼1
Democratic	21	22	▲1
Total	56	56	

=== Georgia House of Representatives ===
Party	Before	After	Change
Republican	105	103	▼2
Democratic	75	77	▲2
Total	180	180	

== Judicial elections ==
Two seats on the Supreme Court of Georgia were up for nonpartisan statewide election to succeed justices Charlie Bethel and Sarah Warren. Both seats were contested; Bethel was challenged by former state legislator Beth Beskin and Warren was challenged by attorney Hal Moroz. Both justices won their respective races.

Elections were also held for five seats on the Georgia Court of Appeals to succeed judges Elizabeth Gobeil, Todd Markle, Sara Doyle, Christian Coomer and Trent Brown. They all won their races uncontested. A sixth judge, Carla McMillian, also appeared on the ballot despite having been appointed to the state supreme court by Governor Brian Kemp in April.

=== Bethel's seat ===
Results by county Bethel: 50–60%; 60–70%; 70–80%; Beskin: 50–60%; 60–70%

2020 Georgia Supreme Court (Bethel's seat) election
Party	Candidate	Votes	%
Nonpartisan	Charlie Bethel (incumbent)	1,098,264	52.19%
Nonpartisan	Beth Beskin	1,006,065	47.81%
Total votes		2,104,329	100.0%

=== Warren's seat ===
Results by county Warren: 60–70%; 70–80%; 50–60%

2020 Georgia Supreme Court (Warren's seat) election
Party	Candidate	Votes	%
Nonpartisan	Sarah Hawkins Warren (incumbent)	1,652,532	78.75%
Nonpartisan	Hal Moroz	446,026	21.25%
Total votes		2,098,558	100.0%

== District Attorneys ==
Out of the state's 49 judicial circuits, 40 held elections for district attorney, and 15 incumbents were replaced either by primary or general election. In addition, a special election for the Western Judicial Circuit saw the appointed incumbent Democrat defeated in the first round, with Deborah Gonzalez winning the second round against James Chafin (independent).

- Augusta: Natalie Paine (R) was defeated by Jared Williams (D)
- Brunswick: Jackie Johnson (R) was defeated by Keith Higgins (independent)
- Chatham: Meg Heap (R) was defeated by Shelena Cook Jones (D)
- Chattahoochee: Julia Slater (D) was defeated in the Democratic primary by Mark Jones (D), who had no general challenger
- Cobb: Joyette Holmes (R) was defeated by Flynn Broady (D)
- Fulton: Paul Howard (D) was defeated in the Democratic primary runoff by Fani Willis (D), who had no general challenger
- Gwinnett: Danny Porter (R) was defeated by Patsy Austin-Gatson (D)
- Macon: David Cooke (D) was defeated in the Democratic primary by Anita Reynolds Howard (D), who had no general challenger

== Ballot measures ==
=== Amendment 1 ===
"Allow Tax Revenue Dedication"

Amendment 1 results by county Yes: 80–90%; 70–80%; 60–70%

Authorizes the Georgia State Legislature to pass legislation establishing special funds with dedicated revenue sources to fund statute specific projects.

Amendment 1
Choice	Votes	%
For	3,862,568	81.62
Against	869,540	18.38
Total	4,732,108	100.00

=== Amendment 2 ===
"Waive Sovereign Immunity"

Amendment 2 results by county Yes: 80–90%; 70–80%; 60–70%

Waives the state's sovereign immunity, allowing residents to seek relief through the superior courts from state or local laws that are found to violate the U.S. Constitution, state Constitution, or state law.

Amendment 2
Choice	Votes	%
For	3,491,296	74.46
Against	1,197,792	25.54
Total	4,689,088	100.00

=== Referendum A ===
"Extend Charity Tax Exemption"

Referendum A results by county Yes: 70–80%; 60–70%; 50–60%

Exempts property taxes for property owned by a 501(c)(3) public charity as long as the property is owned exclusively for the purpose of building or repairing single-family homes and the charity provides interest-free financing to the purchaser of the home.

Referendum A
Choice	Votes	%
For	3,451,116	73.09
Against	1,270,737	26.91
Total	4,721,853	100.00

== See also ==
- Voter suppression in the United States 2019–2020: Georgia
- Elections in Georgia (U.S. state)
