= List of first women lawyers and judges in Georgia =

This is a list of the first women lawyer(s) and judge(s) in Georgia. It includes the year in which the women were admitted to practice law (in parentheses). Also included are women who achieved other distinctions such becoming the first in their state to graduate from law school or become a political figure.

== Firsts in Georgia's history ==
=== Law School ===
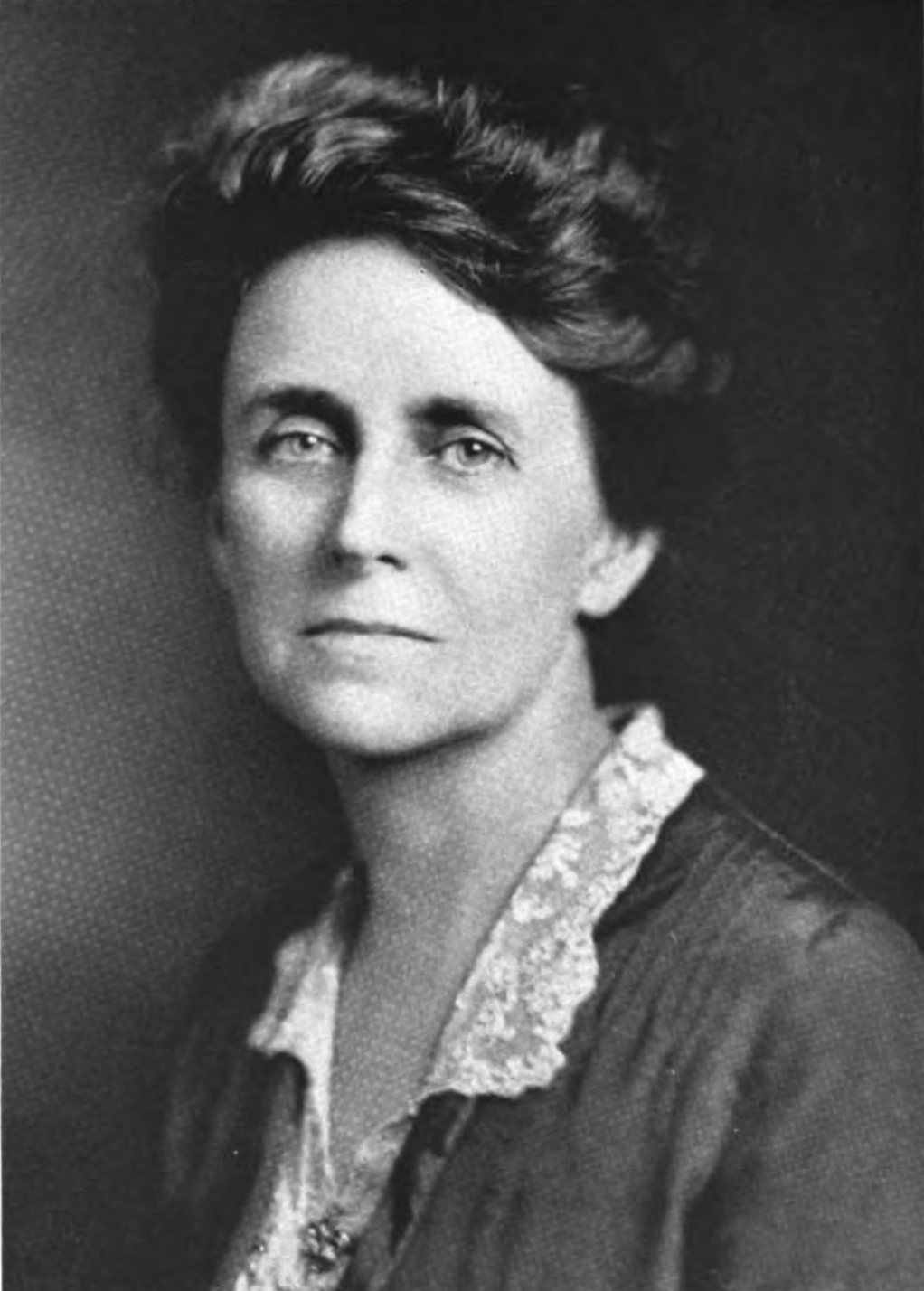
Viola Ross Napier, first to practice before the Georgia Court of Appeals and the Supreme Court of Georgia

- First female law graduate: Minnie Anderson Hale in 1911

=== Lawyers ===
- First females: Minnie Anderson Hale, Betty Reynolds Cobb and Mary C. Johnson (1916)
- First African American female to practice law in Georgia: Estelle Henderson c. 1919
- First female to practice before the Georgia Court of Appeals and the Supreme Court of Georgia: Viola Ross Napier (1920) in 1922
- First African American female (admitted to the State Bar of Georgia): Rachel E. Pruden-Herndon (1942)
- First Asian American (female; Filipino descent): Ruby Carpio Bell (1964)
- First Japanese American female: Vicky Ogawa Kimbrell (1980)

=== State judges ===
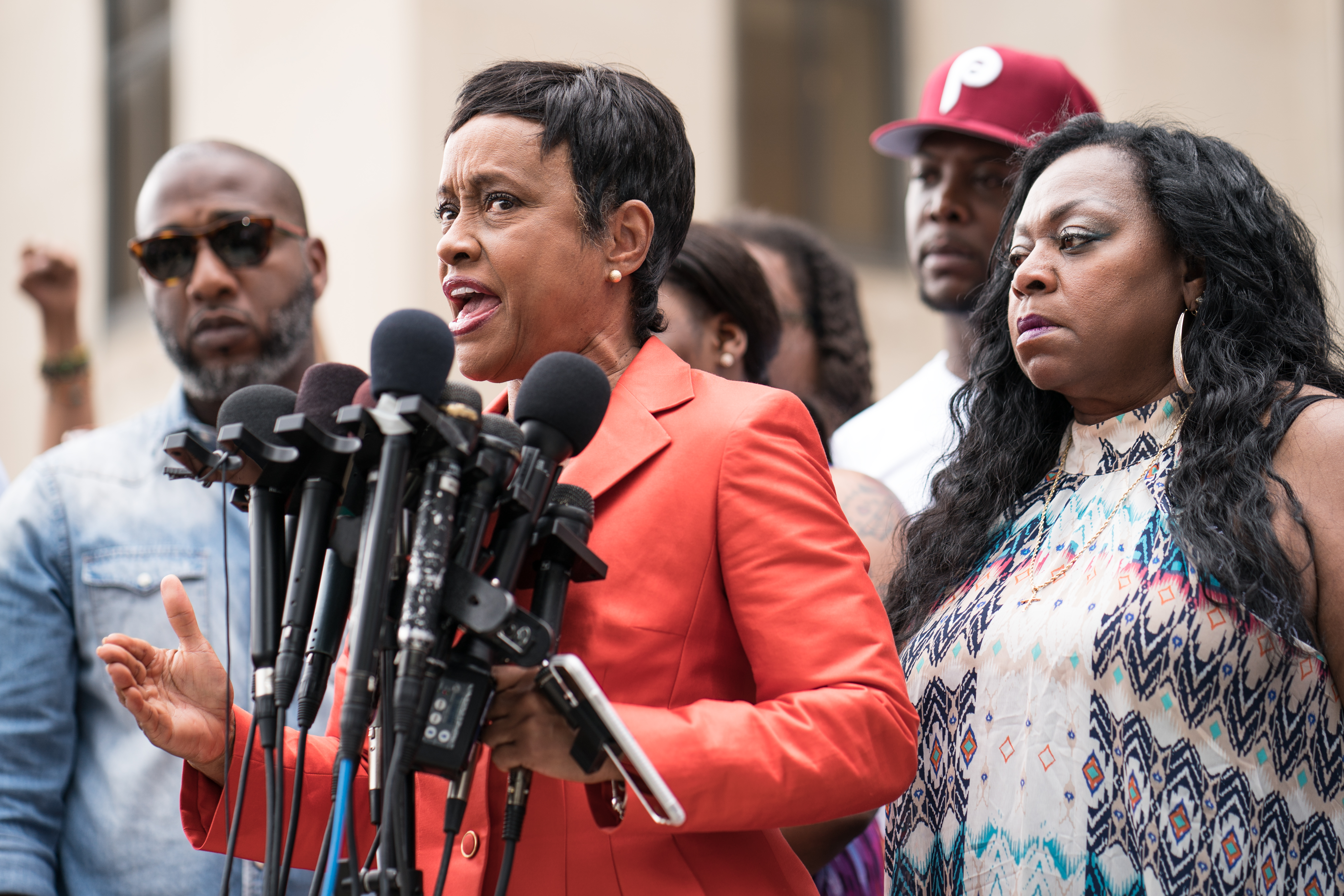
Glenda Hatchett: First African American woman Chief Presiding Judge in Georgia

- First female: Annie Ogburn Anderson in 1922
- First African American females: Romae Turner Powell and Edith Jacqueline Ingram Grant in 1968-1969
- First female (court of record): Dorothy Robinson in 1972
- First female elected (without prior judicial service): Rufe McCombs Maulsby in 1975
- First female elected (superior court): Phyllis A. Kravitch (1943) in 1976
- First female (Georgia Court of Appeals): Dorothy Beasley (1969) in 1984
- First female (temporary judge; Georgia Supreme Court): Dorothy Robinson in 1985
- First African American female (superior court): Leah Ward Sears (1980) in 1988
- First African American female (Chief Presiding Judge of a Georgia court): Glenda Hatchett (1977) in 1990
- First (African American) female (Georgia Supreme Court; Chief Justice): Leah Ward Sears (1980) in 1992 and 2005 respectively
- First female (Georgia Court of Appeals; appointed without judicial experience): Anne Elizabeth Barnes in 1999
- First African American female (Georgia Court of Appeals; Chief Judge): M. Yvette Miller started judicial service in 1999
- First Korean American female: Chong J. Kim in 2000
- First Latino American female: Carolina Colin-Antonini in 2001
- First Asian American (female) (Georgia Court of Appeals): Carla Wong McMillian in 2013
- First Filipino American (female): Rizza O’Connor in 2013
- First South Asian (female): Jaslovelin Jessy Lall in 2015
- First Asian American female (temporary and permanent judge; Georgia Supreme Court): Carla Wong McMillian in 2015 and 2020
- First Jamaican American (female): Jewel Scott in 2020
- First Asian American female (juvenile court): Nahn-Ai Simms in 2020
- First Asian American female (Korean descent) (probate court): Sandra Pak in 2020
- First Persian American female: Ashley Drake in 2020
- First African American female (appointed by a Republican governor; Georgia Court of Appeals): Verda Colvin in 2020
- First Asian American female (County Recorder’s Court): Mihae Park in 2021
- First Latino American female (trial court): Ana Maria Martinez in 2022

=== Federal judges ===
- First female (United States District Court for the Northern District of Georgia; Chief Judge): Orinda Dale Evans (1968) in 1979 and 1999 respectively
- First African American female (Article III judge) to serve in the state of Georgia (United States District Court for the Middle District of Georgia): Leslie Abrams Gardner in 2014
- First female (United States Court of Appeals for the Fifth Circuit; prior to the state's removal): Phyllis A. Kravitch (1943) in 1979
- First female (United States Court of Appeals for the Eleventh Circuit): Frank M. Hull (1973) in 1997
- First African American female (United States Court of Appeals for the Eleventh Circuit): Nancy Abudu in 2023

=== Assistant Attorney General of Georgia ===
- First female: Rubye Jackson in 1960

=== United States Attorney ===
- First female (Northern District of Georgia): Sally Yates in 2010
- First (African American) female (Middle District of Georgia; Acting First Assistant U.S. Attorney): Shanelle Booker in 2022.
- First African American female (Acting U.S. Attorney for the Southern District of Georgia): Tara M. Lyons in 2025

=== District Attorney ===
- First female: Cheryl Fisher Custer in 1981
- First Latino American (female) elected: Deborah Gonzalez in 2020

=== State Bar of Georgia ===
- First female president (Young Lawyers Division): Donna Barwick from 1988-1989
- First female president (State Bar of Georgia): Linda Klein in 1997
- First (African American) female (State Bar of Georgia): Patrise M. Perkins-Hooker in 2014

== Firsts in local history ==
- Heather H. Lanier: First female appointed as a Judge of the South Georgia Circuit Superior Court [Baker, Calhoun, Decatur, Grady and Mitchell Counties, Georgia]
- Martha Christian: First female to serve as a Judge of the Macon Judicial Circuit (1994; Bibb, Peach and Crawford Counties, Georgia)
- Hulane E. George: First female appointed as a Judge of the Ocmulgee Judicial Circuit (2006) [Baldwin, Greene, Hancock, Jasper, Jones, Morgan, Putnam and Wilkinson Counties, Georgia]
- B. Nichole Carswell: First female appointed as a Judge of the Mountain Circuit Superior Court [2025; Banks, Habersham, Rabun and Stephens Counties, Georgia]
- Monica Durden: First African American (female) to serve as a Magistrate Court Judge in Barrow County, Georgia
- Rosemary Greene: First female District Attorney for the Cherokee Judicial Circuit, Georgia [Bartow and Gordon Counties, Georgia]
- Denise Fachini: First female appointed as a Judge of the Cordele Judicial Circuit [Ben Hill, Crisp, Dooly, and Wilcox Counties, Georgia]
- Nelly Fagalde Withers: First Hispanic American (female) to serve as a Judge of Dekalb County's Recorder's Court (2002)
- Eléonore Raoul: First female to graduate from Emory University’s School of Law in Atlanta, Georgia (1920) [DeKalb and Fulton Counties, Georgia]
- Sarah Irene Brown, Lucine Milan Dalton, Ann Kimsey and Mrs. Holbrook: First females to graduate from John Marshall Law School (1938) [DeKalb and Fulton Counties, Georgia]
- Mary Welcome (1968): First African American female Court Solicitor in Atlanta, Georgia (DeKalb and Fulton Counties, Georgia; 1975)
- Sharon Mackenzie and Diana McDonald: First females to graduate from the Georgia State University College of Law (1984) [DeKalb and Fulton Counties, Georgia]
- Catharina Haynes (1986): First female graduate from Emory University’s School of Law in Atlanta, Georgia to be appointed to the US Court of Appeals for the Fifth Circuit [DeKalb and Fulton Counties, Georgia]
- Judith Nush: First Latino American female judge in Chamblee, DeKalb County, Georgia
- Chong Kim: First Asian American female to serve as a municipal court judge for Doraville, Georgia (2020) [DeKalb and Fulton Counties, Georgia]
- Vanessa Kosky: First Latino American female to serve as a municipal court judge for Doraville, Georgia (2020) [DeKalb and Fulton Counties, Georgia]
- Sherry Boston: First (African American) female to serve as a municipal court judge for Dunwoody, Georgia [DeKalb and Fulton Counties, Georgia]
- Layla Zon: First female District Attorney and Judge of the Superior Court in the Alcovy Circuit Court, Georgia (2010) [Newton and Walton Counties, Georgia]
- Edith Elizabeth House: First female graduate from the University of Georgia School of Law (1925) [Athens-Clark County, Georgia]
- Eva L. Sloan: First female lawyer in Milledgeville, Georgia [Baldwin County, Georgia]
- Alene Hardin (c. 1918): First female lawyer in Macon, Georgia [Bibb County, Georgia]
- Faye Sanders Martin (1956): First woman to practice law in Bulloch County, Georgia. She would later become the first female Ogeechee Judicial Circuit judge.
- Sarah Estelle ("Stella") Akin (1917): First female lawyer in Savannah, Georgia [Chatham County, Georgia]
- Mary V. Clark Creech (1939): First female lawyer in Savannah, Georgia to have a courtroom practice [Chatham County, Georgia]
- Shalena Jones: First African American female elected as the District Attorney of Chatham County, Georgia (2020)
- Shannon Wallace: First female to serve as the District Attorney for Cherokee County, Georgia
- Leah Ward Sears (1980): First African American female (and African American in general) judge in Clayton County, Georgia
- Jewel Scott: First Jamaican American (female) appointed as a Judge of the Clayton County Superior Court (2020). She was also the first (Caribbean-American) female District Attorney for Clayton County.
- Jenny Nguyen: First Asian American female judge in Clayton County, Georgia
- Helen Huff (1939): First female lawyer in Cobb County, Georgia
- Dorothy Robinson: First female to serve as a Judge of the Cobb County Superior Court, Georgia (1972)
- Adele Grubbs (1969): First female to serve as the Assistant District Attorney for Cobb County, Georgia (1977)
- Joyette Holmes: First (African American) female to serve as the District Attorney and a Magistrate Judge for Cobb County, Georgia (2019)
- Cathy Cox (1984): First female lawyer in Bainbridge, Georgia [Decatur County, Georgia]
- Linda W. Hunter (1981): First African American female judge of the DeKalb Superior Court and Chief Judge and Administrative Judge of the DeKalb Superior Court [DeKalb County, Georgia]
- Carol W. Hunstein: First female elected as a Judge of the Superior Court bench in DeKalb County, Georgia (1984)
- Gwendolyn Keyes Fleming: First African American female elected as the District Attorney of the Stone Mountain Circuit (2004) [DeKalb County, Georgia]
- Christina Peterson: First African American (female) probate judge in Douglas County, Georgia
- Angela DeLorme (1984): First female lawyer in Fannin County, Georgia
- Kathy Valencia: First female appointed as a Judge of the Fayette County Magistrate Court, Georgia (2010)
- Rhonda Kreuziger: First [African American] female to serve as a Judge of the Griffin Judicial Circuit (2021)
- Jane Kent Plaginos Mitchell (1971): First female lawyer in Forsyth County, Georgia
- Dorothy Beasley (1969): First female judge in Fulton County, Georgia (1977)
- Glenda Hatchett (1977): First African American female to become the Chief Presiding Judge of the Fulton County, Georgia Juvenile Court (1990)
- Tiffany Carter-Sellers: First (African American) female to serve as the municipal court judge for South Fulton, Georgia (2017)
- Fani Willis: First (African American) female to serve as the District Attorney for Fulton County, Georgia (2020)
- Y. Soo Jo: First Asian American (female) to serve as the County Attorney for Fulton County, Georgia (2021)
- LaVonda Reed: First African American (female) to serve as the Dean of the Georgia State University College of Law (2021)
- Cynthia Adams: First African American [female] to serve as the Chief Judge of Douglas County Superior Court (2024)
- Lanelle Rimes Eaves: First female lawyer in Brunswick, Georgia [Glynn County, Georgia]
- Ruth Rocker McMullin: First Vietnamese American female judge in Gwinnett County, Georgia
- Ronda Colvin-Leary: First African American female elected as a Judge of the Gwinnett County State Court (2018) [Gwinnett County, Georgia]
- Tiffany Porter: First African American (female) to serve as the Associate Judge of Duluth, Georgia (2019) [Gwinnett County, Georgia]
- Tadia Whitner: First African American (female) appointed as a Judge of the Gwinnett County Superior Court (2019)
- Angela D. Duncan: First openly LGBT female to serve as a Judge of the Gwinnett County Superior Court (2020)
- Patsy Austin-Gatson: First African American female elected as the District Attorney of Gwinnett County, Georgia (2020)
- Sandra Pak: First Korean American female judge in Gwinnett County, Georgia (2020)
- Mihae Park: First Asian American female to serve as a Judge of the Gwinnett County Recorder’s Court (2021)
- Pandora Palmer (1994): First female to serve as a Judge of the State Court of Henry County, Georgia (2019)
- Holly Veal: First African American (female) to serve as a Judge in the Flint Judicial Circuit (Superior Court of Henry County; 2018)
- Danielle P. Roberts: First African-American (female) to serve as a Judge of the State Court of Henry County, Georgia (2020)
- Aretha Miller: First female lawyer in Laurens County, Georgia
- Annie Anderson: First female judge in Laurens County, Georgia (1922), appointed to Juvenile Court by a superior court judge.
- Kathryn Pierce: First female to graduate from Mercer University’s Walter F. George School of Law in Macon-Bibb County, Georgia (1919)
- Verda Colvin: First African American female to serve as a Judge of the Macon Judicial Circuit
- Anita Reynolds Howard: First African American (female) to serve as the District Attorney in the Macon Judicial District (2021)
- Nancy Calhoun (1985): First female lawyer in Murray County, Georgia
- Tami Wells Thomas: First African American (female) judge in Newton County, Georgia (2019)
- Cheveda McCamy: First African American (female) to serve as a Judge of the Alcovy Judicial Circuit (2020; Newton and Walton Counties, Georgia)
- Maureen Wood: First African American (female) to serve as a Judge of the Rockland Juvenile Court (2016)

== See also ==
- List of first women lawyers and judges in the United States
- Timeline of women lawyers in the United States
- Women in law

== Other topics of interest ==
- List of first minority male lawyers and judges in the United States
- List of first minority male lawyers and judges in Georgia
