= 2008 Georgia state elections =

2008 Georgia elections
- November 4, 2008

Georgia's state elections were held on November 4, 2008. The primary elections were held on February 5, also known as Super Tuesday.

== Federal elections ==
=== United States Presidential election ===
==== Presidential primaries ====
===== Democratic primary =====
Georgia Democratic presidential primary, 2008
Candidate	Votes	Percentage	National delegates
Barack Obama	704,247	66.39%	60
Hillary Clinton	330,026	31.11%	27
John Edwards	18,209	1.72%	0
Joe Biden	2,538	0.24%	0
Dennis Kucinich	2,096	0.20%	0
Bill Richardson	1,879	0.18%	0
Mike Gravel	952	0.09%	0
Christopher Dodd	904	0.09%	0
Totals	1,060,851	100.00%	87

Key:	Withdrew prior to contest

===== Republican primary =====
Georgia Republican presidential primary, 2008
Candidate	Votes	Percentage	Delegates
Mike Huckabee	326,874	33.9%	45
John McCain	304,751	31.6%	3
Mitt Romney	290,707	30.2%	0
Ron Paul	28,096	2.9%	0
Rudy Giuliani	7,162	0.7%	0
Fred Thompson	3,414	0.4%	0
Alan Keyes	1,458	0.2%	0
Duncan Hunter	755	0.1%	0
Tom Tancredo	324	0.0%	0
Totals	963,541	100.00%	48

Key:	Withdrew prior to contest

==== Presidential general election ====
In the general election, Republican nominee John McCain prevailed over Democratic nominee Barack Obama in Georgia by 52.23% to 47.02%. McCain's five point margin of victory was significantly down from George W. Bush's seventeen point margin of victory over John Kerry in 2004. Though Obama benefited from high turnout by black and young voters as well as strong performance in Georgia's Urban areas, McCain's comparatively stronger performance in the rural northern and southeastern parts of the state, as well as winning seventy-seven percent of white voters, gave him the overall victory.

The 2008 Presidential election was particularly interesting in the state of Georgia considering that of the several independent and third-party candidates who ran for president that year, two of them were from Georgia (those being former Republican Representative Bob Barr (L) (who placed third overall in the popular vote in Georgia) and former Democratic Representative Cynthia McKinney (G)).

=== United States Congressional elections ===
During the 2008 Congressional elections, Georgia's Class II Senate seat and all thirteen House seats were up for election.

==== United States Senate election ====
In 2008, incumbent Senator Saxby Chambliss (R) ran for re-election for a second term. His opponents were former Commissioner of Human Resources Jim Martin (D) and Attorney and CPA Allen Buckley (L).

Despite holding a substantial lead over Martin for most of the year, however, the race tightened following the September 2008 market collapse and Chambliss's vote for the Emergency Economic Stabilization Act of 2008, otherwise commonly known as the bailout package. Martin criticized his opponent for voting for the bailout and also, as earlier, repeatedly claimed he supported a supposed twenty-three percent increase in taxes (referring to the FairTax) during his career in Congress. Chambliss accused his opponent, who cast himself as a fiscal conservative, of acting hypocritically for increasing and padlocking his own salary as Commissioner of Human Resources from 2002 to 2003 while the state of Georgia was experiencing a budget crisis. Libertarian nominee Allen Buckley, who on occasion joined Martin in his disapproval of Chambliss's vote for the controversial bailout, campaigned positioning himself as an alternative to both of the major party candidates.

On election day, Chambliss was kept below the minimum of fifty percent plus one vote to win outright, winning 49% to Martin's 46%, and was thus forced into a runoff. Both campaigns sought the endorsement of Buckley, but he refused to endorse either candidate. Chambliss ultimately prevailed over Martin in the December runoff winning 57.4% to 42.6%.

Runoff results
Party	Candidate	Votes	%	±%
Republican	Saxby Chambliss (Incumbent)	1,228,033	57.4%	+7.6%
Democratic	Jim Martin	909,923	42.6%	−4.2%
Majority		318,110	14.8%	
Turnout		2,137,956		
Republican hold		Swing		

==== United States House of Representatives elections ====
All thirteen of Georgia's incumbent Representatives sought re-election in 2008. Going into the elections, Republicans held seven of Georgia's U.S. House seats and Democrats held six seats.

Despite significant gains by Republicans in Georgia since 2002, such as consecutive Republican victories since in Presidential elections since 1996, gaining both of Georgia's U.S. Senate seats, the election of Sonny Perdue as Georgia's first post-Reconstruction Republican governor in 2002, successful elections of Republicans to other state executive offices, and gaining control of both chambers of the Georgia General Assembly for the first time since Reconstruction, Democrats have succeeded in gaining seats of Georgia's House delegation in recent House elections.

Despite Republican efforts to oust Representatives Jim Marshall (GA-8) and John Barrow (GA-12), who were each re-elected in 2006 by extremely close margins despite that being a bad year for Republicans, both of them were re-elected by significant margins. None of Georgia's House seats changed hands in this election.

== State elections ==
=== Georgia Public Service Commission elections ===
In 2008, two seats on the Georgia Public Service Commission were up for election. Though candidates must come from the districts that they wish to represent on the commission, they are elected statewide.

==== Georgia Public Service Commission, District 1 ====
2008 Georgia Public Service Commission District 1 election
- November 4, 2008
Candidate	H. Doug Everett	John Monds
Party	Republican	Libertarian
Popular vote	2,147,012	1,076,726
Percentage	66.6%	33.4%
- County results Everett: 50–60% 60–70% 70–80% 80–90% Monds: 50–60% 60–70%

2008 Public Service Commissioner District 1 election, Georgia
Party	Candidate	Votes	%
Republican	H. Doug Everett	2,147,012	66.60%
Libertarian	John Monds	1,076,726	33.40%

==== Georgia Public Service Commission, District 4 ====
2008 Georgia Public Service Commission District 4 election
- November 4, 2008 (first round); December 2, 2008 (runoff)
Candidate	Lauren W. "Bubba" McDonald	Jim Powell
Party	Republican	Democratic
First round	1,708,972; 47.22%	1,732,147; 47.87%
Runoff	1,136,217; 56.52%	874,112; 43.48%
- McDonald: 40–50% 50–60% 60–70% 70–80% 80–90% Powell: 40–50% 50–60% 60–70% 70–80% 80–90%

2008 Public Service Commissioner District 4 election, Georgia
Party	Candidate	Votes	%
Democratic	Jim Powell	1,732,147	47.87%
Republican	Lauren W. "Bubba" McDonald, Jr.	1,708,972	47.22%
Libertarian	Brandon Givens	177,706	4.91%

2008 Public Service Commissioner District 4 runoff election, Georgia
Party	Candidate	Votes	%
Republican	Lauren W. "Bubba" McDonald, Jr.	1,136,217	56.52%
Democratic	Jim Powell	874,112	43.48%

=== Judicial elections ===
In 2008, two seats on the Supreme Court of Georgia and three on the Georgia Court of Appeals were up for election. All judicial elections in Georgia are officially non-partisan.

==== Supreme Court of Georgia elections ====
Incumbent state Supreme Court Associate Justices Robert Benham and Harris Hines were re-elected without opposition.

==== Georgia Court of Appeals elections ====
Two judges, those being Gary Andrews and Charles B. Mikell, were re-elected without opposition and one, John H. Ruffin, Jr, retired.

===== Court of Appeals (Ruffin seat) election =====
Following Ruffin's retirement announcement, a field of candidates emerged to run for the seat. The seven candidates who would run in the election were Dekalb County prosecutor Mike Sheffield, state Senators (former and then-current respectively Perry McGuire (R) (the 2006 Republican Attorney General nominee) and Michael Meyer von Bremen (D) (who at the time was the Chairman of the Senate Special Judiciary committee), and attorneys Sara Doyle, Tamela Adkins, Christopher McFadden, and Bruce Edenfield. No candidate was able to win the race outright and so the top two vote getters, Doyle and Sheffield, would face each other in the run off. Doyle narrowly prevailed in the runoff to win election to the Court of Appeals.

Georgia Court of Appeals election, 2008
Party	Candidate	Votes	%	±%
Nonpartisan	Sara Doyle	619,903	22.5	
Nonpartisan	Mike Sheffield	573,807	20.9	
Nonpartisan	Tamela Adkins	527,229	19.2	
Nonpartisan	Christopher McFadden	341,198	12.4	
Nonpartisan	Bruce Edenfield	272,639	9.9	
Nonpartisan	Perry McGuire	219,137	8.0	
Nonpartisan	Michael Meyer von Bremen	196,225	7.1	
Turnout		2,750,138	100	

Georgia Court of Appeals election runoff, 2008
Party	Candidate	Votes	%	±%
Nonpartisan	Sara Doyle	888,191	51.8	+29.3
Nonpartisan	Mike Sheffield	827,825	48.2	+27.3
Turnout		1,716,016	100	

=== Initiatives and referendums ===
Three proposed amendments to the Georgia State Constitution were placed on the ballot for Georgian voters to decide. The proposed amendments were:

- Offer a conservation property tax reduction to property owners to encourage conservation of forests.
- Allow local school districts to use tax dollars for community redevelopment projects.
- Create special Infrastructure Development Districts.

The first two proposed amendments were passed, while the third was rejected.

Encourage preservation of GA forests through conservation property tax reduction
Candidate		Votes	%	±
✓	Yes	2,454,513	68%	
	No	1,154,662	32%	

Amendment 1 results by county Yes: 70–80%; 60–70%; 50–60%

Local school districts to use tax funds for community redevelopment purposes
Candidate		Votes	%	±
✓	Yes	1,868,112	51.5%	
	No	1,756,809	48.5%	

Amendment 2 results by county Yes: 60–70%; 50–60%; No: 60–70%; 50–60%

Creation of special Infrastructure Development Districts for underserved areas
Candidate		Votes	%	±
✓	No	1,777,619	51.6%	
	Yes	1,665,890	48.4%	

Amendment 3 results by county No: 60–70%; 50–60%; Yes: 50–60%
