= William M. Ray II =

American judge (born 1963)

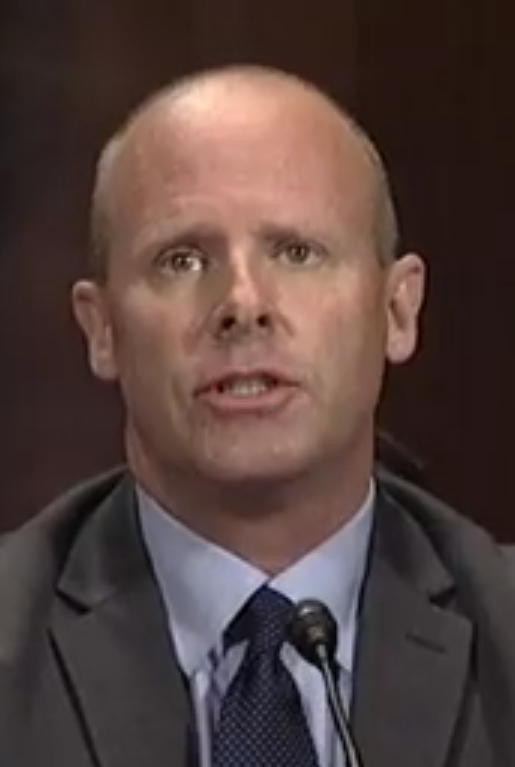

Judge of the United States District Court for the Northern District of Georgia
- Incumbent
- Assumed office October 25, 2018
- Appointed by: Donald Trump
- Preceded by: Harold Lloyd Murphy

Judge of the Georgia Court of Appeals
- In office July 30, 2012 – October 25, 2018
- Appointed by: Nathan Deal
- Preceded by: Keith R. Blackwell
- Succeeded by: Todd Markle

Judge of the Georgia Superior Court for the Gwinnett Judicial Circuit
- In office January 14, 2002 – July 30, 2012
- Appointed by: Roy Barnes
- Succeeded by: George F. Hutchinson III

Member of the Georgia Senate from the 48th district
- In office January 1997 – January 2002
- Preceded by: Clint Day
- Succeeded by: David Shafer

Personal details
- Born: 1963 (age 62–63) Macon, Georgia, U.S.
- Party: Republican
- Spouse: Kelle Chandler (m. 1989)
- Children: Chandler, Davis, Avery
- Education: University of Georgia (BBA, MBA, JD)

William McCrary "Billy" Ray II (born 1963) is a United States district judge of the United States District Court for the Northern District of Georgia. He was previously a judge of the Georgia Court of Appeals and a member of the Georgia State Senate for District 48.

== Biography ==
Ray was born in Macon, Georgia in 1963. He received his Bachelor of Business Administration from the University of Georgia's Terry College of Business in 1985, magna cum laude, his Master of Business Administration from the Terry College of Business in 1986, and his Juris Doctor, cum laude, from the University of Georgia School of Law in 1990. Upon graduation he joined the law firm of Andersen, Davidson & Tate, P.C. in Gwinnett County, Georgia. He ran for the Georgia State Senate in 1996 and spent six years representing the 48th District. He served on the Judiciary, Special Judiciary, Rules, Appropriations, Natural Resources, and Transportation Committees. On January 14, 2002, he took the oath of office to be a Superior Court Judge on the Gwinnett Judicial Circuit, a position in which he served for ten years. On July 30, 2012, Governor Nathan Deal appointed Ray to serve as the 76th Judge of the Court of Appeals of Georgia, where he succeeded Keith R. Blackwell, who was elevated to the state Supreme Court. He served in that capacity until his appointment as a federal judge.

== Federal judicial service ==
On July 13, 2017, President Donald Trump nominated Ray to serve as a United States District Judge of the United States District Court for the Northern District of Georgia, to the seat vacated by Judge Harold Lloyd Murphy, who assumed senior status on March 31, 2017. On September 20, 2017, a hearing on his nomination was held before the Senate Judiciary Committee. On October 19, 2017, his nomination was reported out of committee by an 11–9 vote.

On January 3, 2018, his nomination was returned to the President under Rule XXXI, Paragraph 6 of the United States Senate. On January 5, 2018, President Donald Trump announced his intent to renominate Ray to a federal judgeship. On January 8, 2018, his renomination was sent to the Senate. On January 18, 2018, his nomination was reported out of committee by an 11–10 vote. On October 11, 2018, his nomination was confirmed by a 54–41 vote. He received his judicial commission on October 25, 2018.

== Notable cases ==
During the 2020 Georgia elections, to protect voting rights during the COVID-19 pandemic, the secretary of state of Georgia Brad Raffensperger directed the mailing of absentee (mail-in) ballot applications to all of Georgia's 6.9 million active registered voters for the state's June 2020 primary. The Georgia Association of Latino Elected Officials and other civil rights groups sued the Office of the Secretary of State of Georgia, and the Gwinnett County elections board in Federal District Court, arguing that the mailing of mail-in ballot applications for the 2020 general election (which were only in English) should also have been sent in the Spanish language in Gwinnett County, which has a significant Spanish-speaking population. Judge Ray dismissed the suit in October 2020, ruling that the plaintiffs lacked standing and the English-only mailings did not violate the Voting Rights Act.

== Personal life ==
Ray has been married since 1989 to Dr. Kelle Chandler Ray, who is a clinical psychologist who practices in Lawrenceville, Georgia. They have three sons and reside in Norcross, Georgia.

One of Ray's uncles was Richard Ray, a Democratic United States Congressman from Perry, Georgia and served as Senator Sam Nunn's Chief of Staff in Washington, D.C. for 12 years, and another uncle was Robert Ray of Fort Valley who served in the Georgia House of Representatives for 24 years.

Legal offices
Preceded by Keith R. Blackwell	Judge of the Georgia Court of Appeals; 2012–2018	Succeeded by Todd Markle
Preceded by Harold Lloyd Murphy	Judge of the United States District Court for the Northern District of Georgia; 2018–present	Incumbent
