= 2020 Georgia election =

2020 Georgia election may refer to:

- 2020 Georgia state elections, United States
- 2020 Georgian parliamentary election
