= Tired Creek Lake =

Lake in Grady County, Georgia

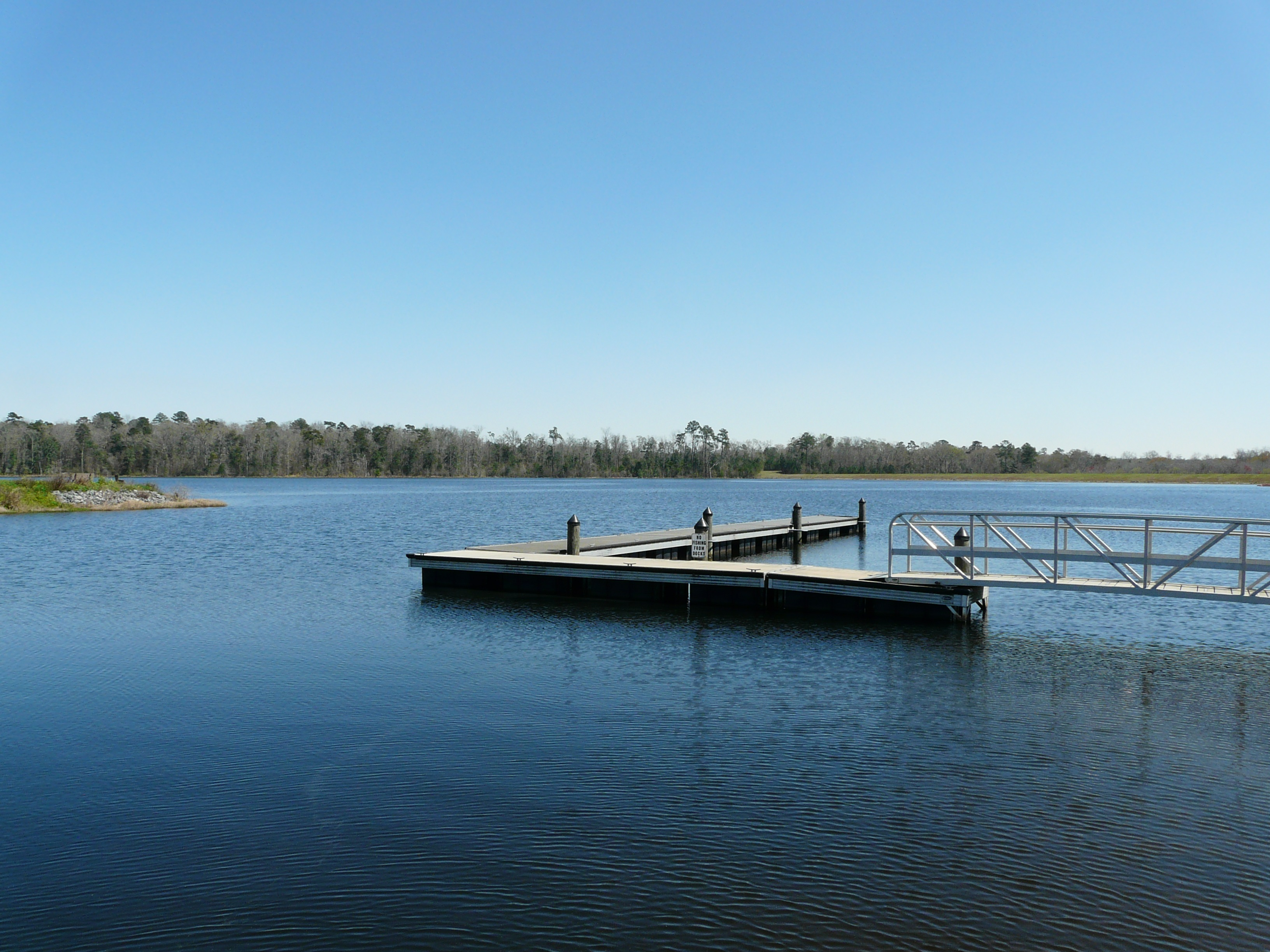
- A floating dock at Tired Creek Lake, 2025

- Location within Georgia Location within the United States
- Location: Georgia, U.S.
- Coordinates: 30.9298°N 84.2625°W
- Type: Artificial
- Basin countries: United States
- Surface area: 960 acres (390 ha)
- Max. depth: 30 ft (9 m)
- Surface elevation: 220 ft (67 m)
- Website: https://cairogachamber.com/tired-creek-lake

Tired Creek Lake is a lake in Cairo, Georgia in Grady County. It is a 960-acre recreational fishing lake at the confluence of Black Creek, Buss Creek, and Sapp Creek. The lake is named after Tired Creek. At full pool the lake is 220.2 feet above sea level. The lake is located at 263 State Park Road.

== History ==
The idea for constructing a lake at the site dates to the 1930s.

In 1962, The U.S. Study Commission, Southeast River Basins produced Plan for Development of the Land and Water Resources of the Southeast River Basins which involved a proposal to develop Tired Creek Lake. Grady County then began pursuing this as a State Park project.

In 1968, Grady County Recreation Committee sought funding from the Bureau of Outdoor Recreation towards the Tired Creek Lake project. In the same year, Wiedeman & Singleton Engineers produced a report for a dam site.

In 1973, Grady County gave the deed of the site to Georgia Department of Natural Resources for the purpose of establishing Tired Creek State Park. The department then produced a master plan for the park which included a lake. The state government then began construction but this ended when funding was cut.

In 1993, the land for the site was returned to Grady County.

In 1996, Grady County established the Tired Creek Advisory Committee. This committee considered potential uses for the site and liased with regulatory agencies.

In 2006, Grady County made a Clean Water Act Section 404 Permit application to the US Army Corps of Engineers.

In 2010, Grady County received a permit from the US Army Corps of Engineers to construct the lake. Grady County took out $10 million in bonds to fund the project. In July, Grady County commissioners accepted bids totaling $238,349.50 from four surveying firms, splitting required work between the firms in order to complete the surveying of mitigation tracts by a 16 July deadline.

In 2013, construction began on the project.

In 2015, the Georgia Supreme Court ruled in favor of Grady County after a two-year-long case concerning permission to cut down more trees beyond what is usually permitted. In the same year, the lake was stocked with bass. By the end of the year, the construction of the lake had been completed pending final approval from the US Army Corps of Engineers to fill the lake.

In 2016, the county started to fill the lake and constructed boat ramps along with amenities.

In 2017, biologists from the Georgia Department of Natural Resources concluded that bass stocking in the lake had been successful. In July, at a vision meeting for the lake project assembled authorities emphasized that the primary economic focus of the lake would be fishing.

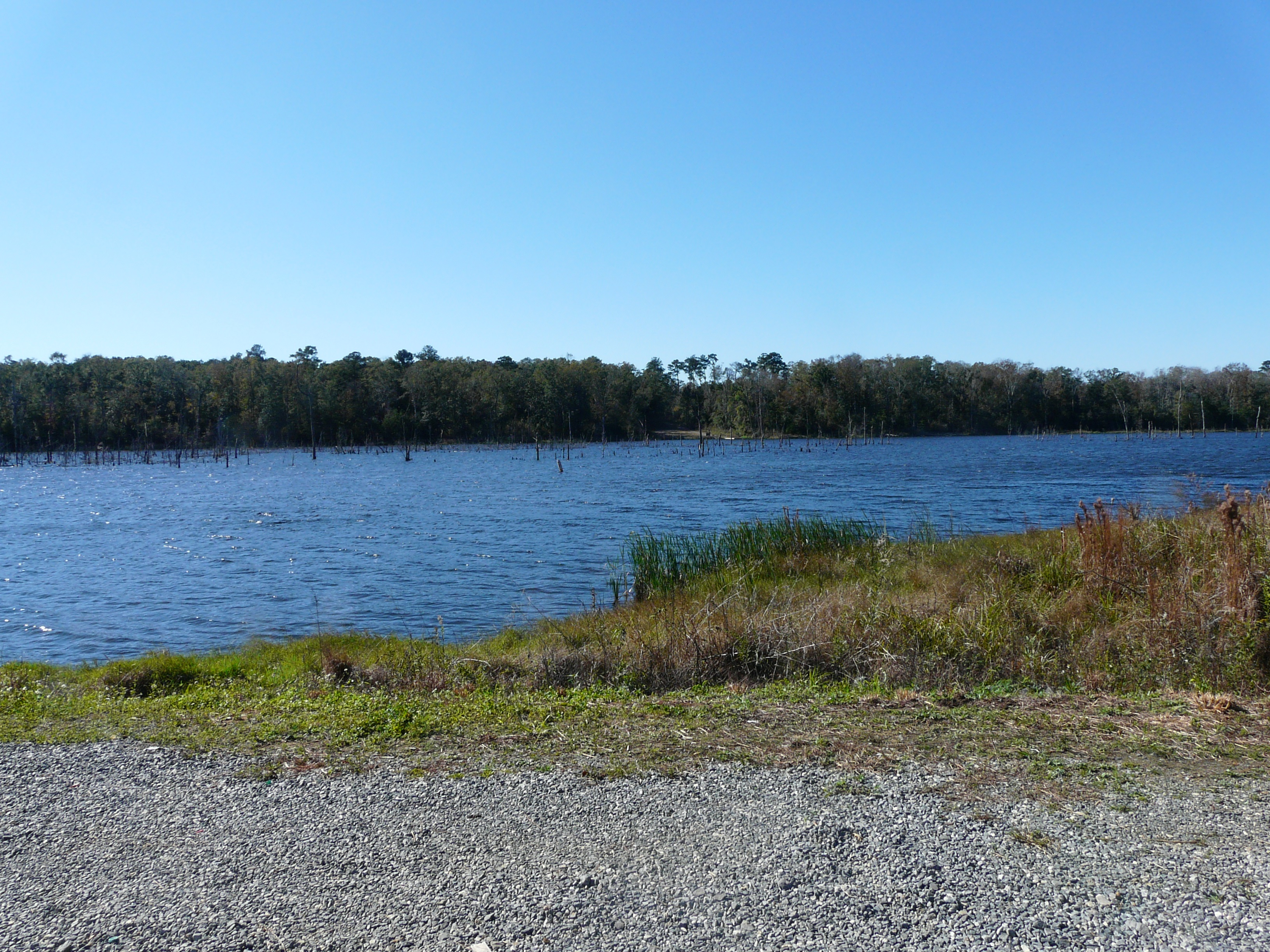
Tired Creek Lake looking west

In 2018, the lake was officially opened on the Friday before Memorial Day weekend. On 26 May, Sherry Vann caught a 14-lb largemouth bass which Georgia Outdoor News described as a "monster". Initially, the lake was free for people from Grady County and children under 15 years of age, and $3 per day for non-residents of the county. In June, changes to its fishing policies and prices meant that people from outside of the county had to pay $10 per day with the option of a $200 yearly pass. In September, the Grady County Board of Commissioners approved a recommendation from the Grady County Lake Authority to permit duck hunting at the lake. A total of 216 permits were to be issued, assigned through a lottery.

In 2020, Grady County officials met with Raymond James and Associates to discuss refinancing the $10 million worth of bonds that were taken out in 2010. The County Administrator at this time, Buddy Johnson, supported this. Payments on these bonds are supported by fishing revenues.

In 2021, Amanda Parker caught a 28-inch-long largemouth bass weighing 14.60 lb, setting a new record both for the lake and for the largest bass caught by a Georgia woman in 50 years.

In 2023, Cairo Grady Development LLC signed a $1.7 million contract to purchase 200 acres of land at Tired Creek Lake for the purpose of developing a campground.

In 2025, officials discussed infrastructure upgrades at the lake including the installation of electricity and the creation of a family-oriented recreational space.

== Ecology ==
Georgia Department of Natural Resources completed water sampling and monitoring alongside visual surveys from April 2016 until September 2018. In this report, the Department of Natural Resources Environmental Protection Division noted "illegal dumping of old furniture, tires, litter" in the creeks flowing into Tired Creek Lake. The report indicated that the presence of Escherichia coli (E. Coli) in the lake was at similar concentration (cfu/100mL) to Litte Tired, Parkers Mill, Tired Creek, and Turkey Creek. The air and water temperature at Tired Creek Lake was slightly higher than the other measured sites.

== Politics ==
The Georgia Water Coalition opposed the development of the lake, describing it as "unnecessary". The coalition criticized the estimated costs associated with the lake development project. The coalition said Grady County had "fought to minimize the size of the buffer around the lake" and "refused to put the undeveloped portion of the property – more than 2,000 acres – under a conservation easement".
