= Steve Dillard =

Steve Dillard may refer to:

- Steve Dillard (baseball) (born 1951), American baseball player
- Stephen Dillard (born 1969), American judge and political activist
