= Stephen S. Goss =

American judge (1961–2019)

Judge of the Georgia Court of Appeals
- In office August 1, 2018 – August 24, 2019
- Appointed by: Nathan Deal
- Preceded by: Gary B. Andrews
- Succeeded by: Trea Pipkin

Personal details
- Born: November 16, 1961
- Died: August 24, 2019 (aged 57) Albany, Georgia, U.S.
- Spouse: Dee
- Children: 3
- Education: University of Georgia (AB, JD)

Stephen S. Goss (November 16, 1961 – August 24, 2019) was an American jurist who served as judge of the Georgia Court of Appeals.

== Education ==
Goss received his Bachelor of Arts from the University of Georgia and his Juris Doctor from the University of Georgia School of Law.

== Legal career ==
Goss was a partner in the Albany law firms of Watson, Spence, Lowe and Chambless, LLP and Cannon, Meyer von Bremen and Goss, LLP. He also previously served as the solicitor for the Dougherty Circuit Juvenile Court.

== State court service ==
He was appointed as judge of the Dougherty Circuit Juvenile Court and served from 1995 to 1999. He was a member of the Supreme Court of Georgia's Child Placement Project committee. He was later appointed by Governor Barnes to fill a vacancy on the Superior Court of the Dougherty Judicial Circuit in 1999.

== Appointment to Georgia Court of Appeals ==
Goss' name was amongst many to fill one of three vacancies on the Court of Appeals. On May 10, 2018 Goss was appointed by Nathan Deal to serve as a judge on the Court of Appeals of Georgia, replacing retired judge Gary B. Andrews. He was sworn into office on August 1, 2018.

== Consideration for Georgia Supreme Court ==
In November 2016 Goss' was among thirteen candidates being vetted for one of three vacancies on the Georgia Supreme Court.

== Personal ==
Goss was married to the former Dee Collins of Cotton, Mitchell County, Georgia. They were the parents of two daughters, Collins and Clark, and a son, Clint. On August 24, 2019 Goss was found near his home, dead of a gunshot wound.

Legal offices
Preceded by Gary B. Andrews	Judge of the Georgia Court of Appeals; 2018–2019	Succeeded by Trea Pipkin
