= Tired Creek =

Stream in Georgia, U.S.

Coordinates: 30°44′31.70″N 84°13′2.64″W

Tired Creek is a stream in the U.S. state of Georgia. It is a tributary to the Ochlockonee River. Tired Creek was so named on account of the stream's slow current.

Tired Creek is connected to Tired Creek Lake, a 960-acre recreational fishing lake which opened in 2018 after Grady County received a 2010 permit from the US Army Corps of Engineers to construct the lake.
