= Minnie Anderson Hale =

American lawyer

Minnie Anderson Hale (later Minnie Hale Daniel) was an American lawyer. Hale is one of the first three female lawyers in Georgia. Hale was also the Vice-President of the Georgia of the Women Lawyers' Association.

== Legal career ==
On June 9, 1911, Hale became the first female to graduate from the Atlanta Law School—as well as the first female to graduate from a law school in the state. Nevertheless, she was denied the right to practice law.

In 1916 "An Act to Permit Females to Practice Law", otherwise known as the "Portia Bill", was signed by Governor Nathaniel Edwin Harris, and Hale was finally admitted to practice law in the state of Georgia. She became the first of the three female lawyers in Georgia, as Betty Reynolds Cobb and Mary C. Johnson were admitted the same year.

In 1922, Hale was elected as the Vice-President of the Georgia of the Women Lawyers' Association.

== See also ==
- List of first women lawyers and judges in Georgia
