= Betty Reynolds Cobb =

American lawyer

Betty Reynolds Cobb (October 23, 1884 – May 27, 1956) was an attorney, author, and activist.

She was one of the first women accepted to the bar, and one of the first female lawyers in Georgia. In 1916, Minnie Anderson Hale, Cobb, and Mary C. Johnson were respectively admitted in the state of Georgia to practice law. Cobb was also an early member of the League of Women Voters.

In 1916, her book "Little Boy Black" was published.

== Early life/family ==
Cobb was born on October 23, 1884, in a mostly white neighborhood in Cedartown, Georgia. She was raised by her parents in Carrollton, Georgia, and grew up with her brothers and cousins. Betty was married and widowed at a very early age to local merchant, Hiram Felix Cobb. Felix died shortly after the birth of their daughter, Elizabeth Reynolds Cobb. Companionless, Betty was obligated to care for her young daughter without a father figure. Following Elizabeth's high school commencement exercises, Betty re-located in Atlanta, Georgia. Elizabeth received a higher education at Agnes Scott College. Elizabeth later married James E. Boyd, former president of West Georgia College. During Boyd's reign, a women's dormitory was built in honor of Betty and her accomplishments.

== Schooling/career ==
Cobb received a high school diploma but never completed the formal, official training to become a lawyer. Before passing the bar exam, she pursued a career in teaching and earned a living as associate editor of the newspaper, Carroll Free Press. Cobb was the former president and one of the founders of the Georgia Association of Women Voters. Betty was affiliated with the League of Women Voters, Active Voters, and the Fourth District A&M School board of trustees. Every year, outstanding students of the University of West Georgia are awarded the Betty Reynolds Cobb scholarship.

Writing was a component of Betty's career. She published "Little Boy Black", a collection of short stories, in 1926. Cobb also served as a secretary to Sidney Holderness. While in office, Betty confidentially studied law and prepared to take the bar exam. Betty’s newfound knowledge and interest in law led her to believe that she was well-prepared to take the Georgia State Bar Exam. After passing the bar exam, Cobb practiced law for 25 years.

== Activism ==
Georgia was among the last of the southern states in the United States to allow women to play a role in law. Georgia waited many years after women were first permitted to be attorneys to grant them their right to sit for the bar exam. Under certain conditions of the state law, women were not qualified as candidates for the bar exam. Betty Reynolds Cobb is credited for her leading role in feminism. She sought for women to have the right to hold higher positions in society. Betty addressed many issues ranging from the betterment of women in the general public to the entrance of women in areas of specialization. Cobb believed that women should have been allowed to pursue duties other than those belonging to the typical homemaker. She also believed that women should have been granted the opportunity to be successful in the community if they displayed the same qualities and abilities as men.

== "Little Boy Black" ==
"Little Boy Black"

Cobb was actively engaged in writing. Her short story, "Little Boy Black" was published in Macon, Georgia, 1926, by The J.W. Burke Company Publishers. The book was illustrated by John E. Cramer, Jr.

The life and southern culture of Carrollton, Georgia, inspired her to write the short story having a Negro, African American boy as the main character. "Little Boy Black" consists of nine short stories: "Little Boy Black", "Ol' Master", "Love and Politics", "Aunt Savannah's White Folks", "Uncle Lige Pleads His Own Case", "The Owl Foretells a Parting", "The Coward", "Miss Julie's Ring", and "Counsel for Defense".

== Death ==
Cobb died in Atlanta, Georgia, May 27, 1956. Her eulogy was delivered in Atlanta and her burial proceeded in Carrollton, Georgia.

== See also ==
- List of first women lawyers and judges in Georgia
