= Betsy Holland =

American politician

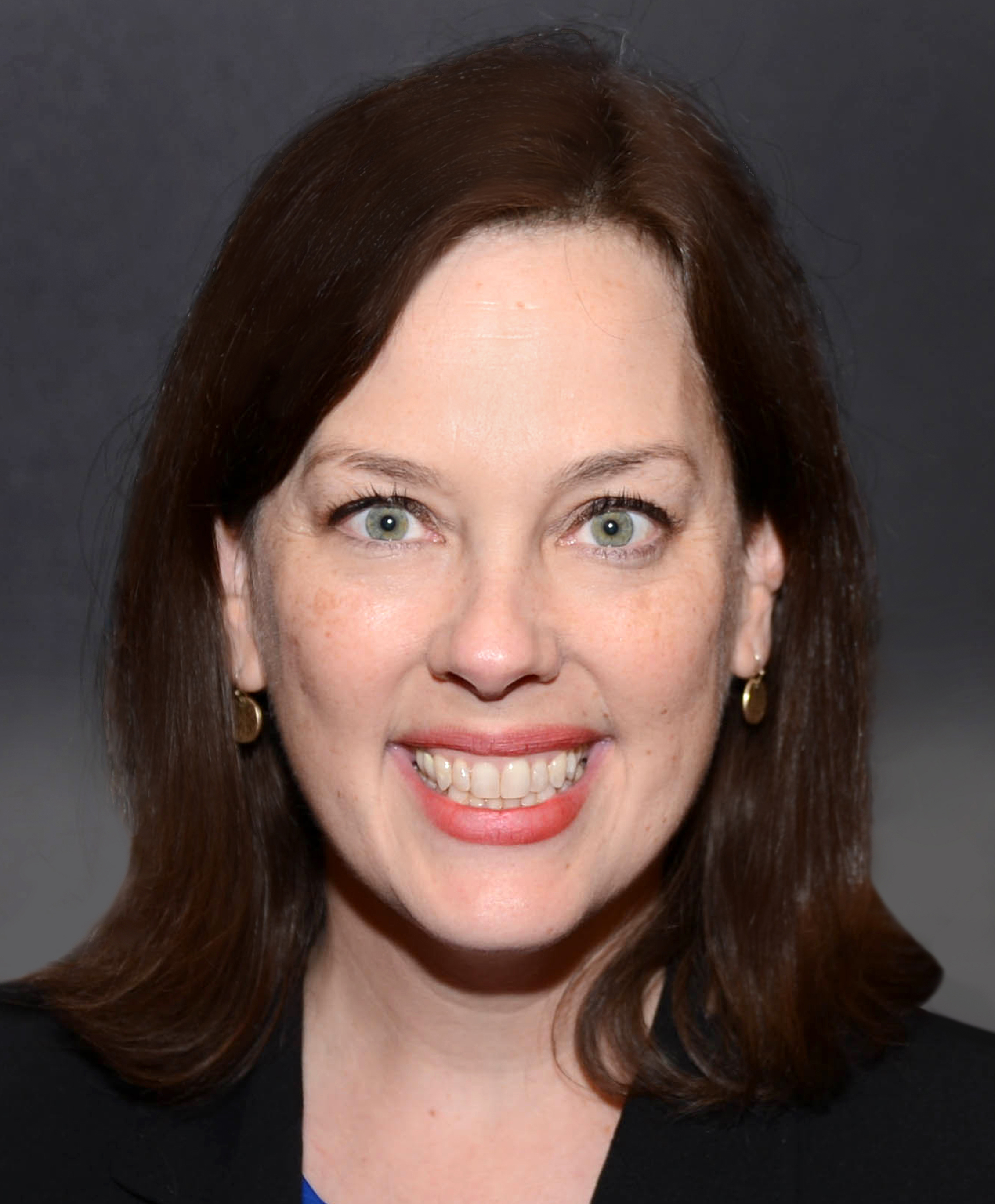

Member of the Georgia House of Representatives from the 54th district
- Incumbent
- Assumed office January 14, 2019
- Preceded by: Beth Beskin

Personal details
- Born: January 10, 1976 (age 50)
- Party: Democratic
- Spouse: Jason
- Education: Smith College
- Occupation: Corporate executive

Betsy Holland (born January 10, 1976) is an American politician. She is a Democrat representing the 54th district in the Georgia House of Representatives.

== Political career ==
In 2018, Holland ran for election to represent District 54 in the Georgia House of Representatives. She won a three-way Democratic primary with 60.6% of the vote, and defeated Republican incumbent Beth Beskin in the general election. She is running for reelection in 2020.

As of July 2025, Holland sits on the following committees:

- Creative Arts & Entertainment
- Higher Education
- Intragovernmental Cooperation
- Small Business Development

=== Electoral record ===
2018 Democratic primary: Georgia House of Representatives, District 54
Party	Candidate	Votes	%
Democratic	Betsy Holland	2,373	60.6%
Democratic	Dan Berschinski	1,126	28.8%
Democratic	Rob Gibeling	414	10.6%

2018 general election: Georgia House of Representatives, District 54
Party	Candidate	Votes	%
Democratic	Betsy Holland	15,186	51.7%
Republican	Beth Beskin	14,179	48.3%
