= Elizabeth L. Branch =

American judge (born 1968)

Lisa Branch
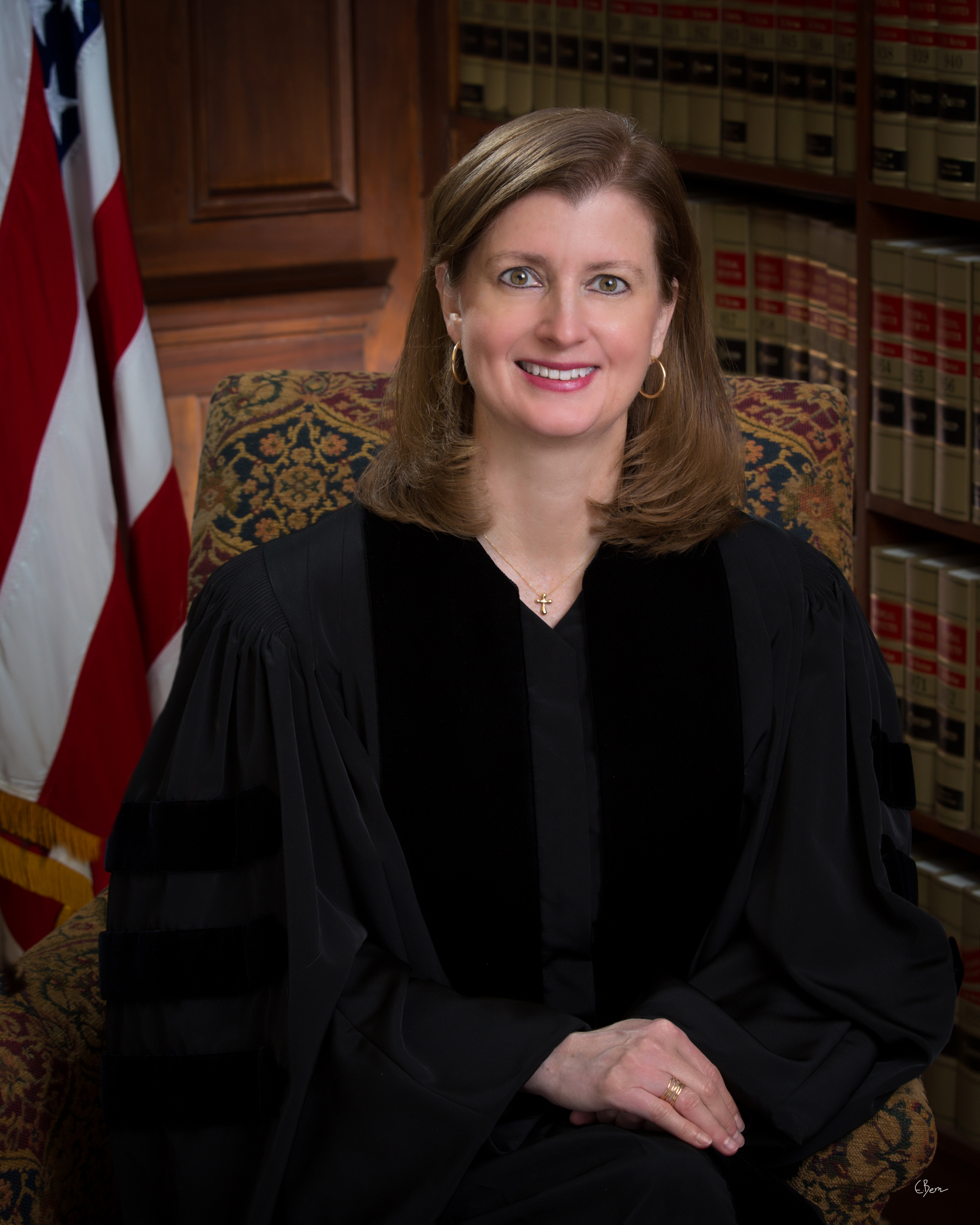
- Official Portrait, 2018

Judge of the United States Court of Appeals for the Eleventh Circuit
- Incumbent
- Assumed office March 19, 2018
- Appointed by: Donald Trump
- Preceded by: Frank M. Hull

Judge of the Georgia Court of Appeals
- In office September 1, 2012 – March 19, 2018
- Appointed by: Nathan Deal
- Preceded by: Charles Mikell
- Succeeded by: Elizabeth Gobeil

Personal details
- Born: Elizabeth Lee Branch; 1968 (age 57–58) Atlanta, Georgia, U.S.
- Education: Davidson College (BA); Emory University (JD)

Elizabeth Lee "Lisa" Branch (born 1968) is an American lawyer and jurist serving as a United States circuit judge of the United States Court of Appeals for the Eleventh Circuit. She was a judge of the Georgia Court of Appeals from 2012 to 2018.

== Early life and education ==
Branch was born in Atlanta, Georgia, in 1968, and was raised in Fulton County. She attended the Westminster Schools before matriculating at Davidson College, where she obtained her Bachelor of Arts (B.A.), cum laude, in 1990. Branch then enrolled at Emory University School of Law; as a law student, she served as the notes and comments editor of the Emory Law Journal and was awarded the university's Charles E. Watkins Jr. scholarship. She graduated with distinction with a Juris Doctor (J.D.) in 1994 and membership in the Order of the Coif.

After law school, Branch served as a law clerk to Judge J. Owen Forrester of the United States District Court for the Northern District of Georgia from 1994 to 1996.

== Career ==
Branch was in private practice in Atlanta from 1996 to 2004, then again from 2008 until 2012. She practiced law at the law firm of Smith, Gambrell & Russell, LLP. There, she was a partner in the commercial litigation practice group.

From 2004 to 2008, Branch served as a senior official in the administration of President George W. Bush. During this period, she served for three years as the counselor to the administrator of the Office of Information and Regulatory Affairs (OIRA) at the United States Office of Management and Budget, and for one year as the associate general counsel for rules and legislation at the United States Department of Homeland Security.

She served as a judge of the Georgia Court of Appeals from 2012 to 2018. She was appointed by Georgia Governor Nathan Deal to succeed Charles Mikell.

=== Federal judicial service ===
On September 7, 2017, President Donald Trump nominated Branch to serve as a United States circuit judge of the United States Court of Appeals for the Eleventh Circuit, to the seat soon vacated by Judge Frank M. Hull, who subsequently assumed senior status on December 31, 2017. On December 13, 2017, a hearing on her nomination was held before the Senate Judiciary Committee.

On January 3, 2018, her nomination was returned to the president under Rule XXXI, Paragraph 6 of the United States Senate. On January 5, 2018, Trump announced his intent to renominate Branch to a federal judgeship. On January 8, 2018, her renomination was sent to the Senate. On January 18, 2018, her nomination was reported out of committee by a 19–2 vote. On February 26, 2018, the Senate invoked cloture on her nomination by a 72–22 vote. The next day, her nomination was confirmed by a 73–23 vote. She received her commission on March 19, 2018.

On September 29, 2022, Judge James C. Ho of the United States Court of Appeals for the Fifth Circuit delivered a speech at a Federalist Society conference in Kentucky and said he would no longer hire law clerks from Yale Law School, which he said was plagued by "cancel culture" and students disrupting conservative speakers. Ho said Yale "not only tolerates the cancellation of views — it actively practices it.", and he urged other judges to likewise boycott the school. Judge Branch confirmed her participation in the Yale hiring boycott. In a statement to National Review Branch said that Ho raised "legitimate concerns about the lack of free speech on law school campuses, Yale in particular," and that she would not consider students from Yale for clerkships in the future. In early April of 2023, Judge Branch and Judge Ho extended this boycott to Stanford Law School after Fifth Circuit Judge Kyle Duncan was shouted down during a lecture at the school on March 9, 2023.

== Notable cases ==
In 2020, she dissented in NAACP v. Alabama, arguing that Congress did not clearly and unambiguously abrogate states’ sovereign immunity from suit under the Voting Rights Act, and that plaintiffs were thus barred by sovereign immunity from suing states under § 2 of the Act.

== Memberships and awards ==
Branch was appointed by Governor Nathan Deal in 2013 to the Georgia Commission on Child Support. She is a member of the board of advisors of the Atlanta Lawyers Chapter for the Federalist Society. She is serving on the Emory University board of visitors through 2018. She is a member of the State Bar of Georgia's Appellate Practice Section and is a Master in the Lamar American Inn of Court and the Bleckley American Inn of Court. Branch is a former co-chair of the Homeland Security and National Defense Committee of the Section of Administrative Law and Regulatory Practice of the American Bar Association. She was selected for inclusion in Georgia Super Lawyers in 2012.

== Electoral history ==
Georgia Court of Appeals Results, May 20, 2014
Party	Candidate	Votes	%
Nonpartisan	Elizabeth L. Branch (incumbent)	714,000	100.00%
Majority		714,000	100.00%
Total votes		714,000	100.00%

Legal offices
Preceded by Frank M. Hull	Judge of the United States Court of Appeals for the Eleventh Circuit; 2018–present	Incumbent
