= Georgia's 54th House of Representatives district =

State district in Georgia, USA

Georgia's 54th State House of Representatives district
Representative
Betsy Holland; D–Atlanta
- Demographics: 68.6% White; 10.6% Black; 6.4% Hispanic; 7.3% Asian
- Population: 56,377

District 54 elects one member of the Georgia House of Representatives. It contains parts of Fulton County.

== Members ==
- George L. Smith
- Hosea Williams (1974-1984)
- Juanita Terry Williams (1985 - 1991)
- Tyrone Brooks (1993-2003)
- Sally Harrell (2003–2004)
- Don R. Thomas (2004-2005)
- Ed Lindsey (2005–2014)
- Beth Beskin (2015–2019)
- Betsy Holland (since 2019)
