= Brian M. Rickman =

American judge

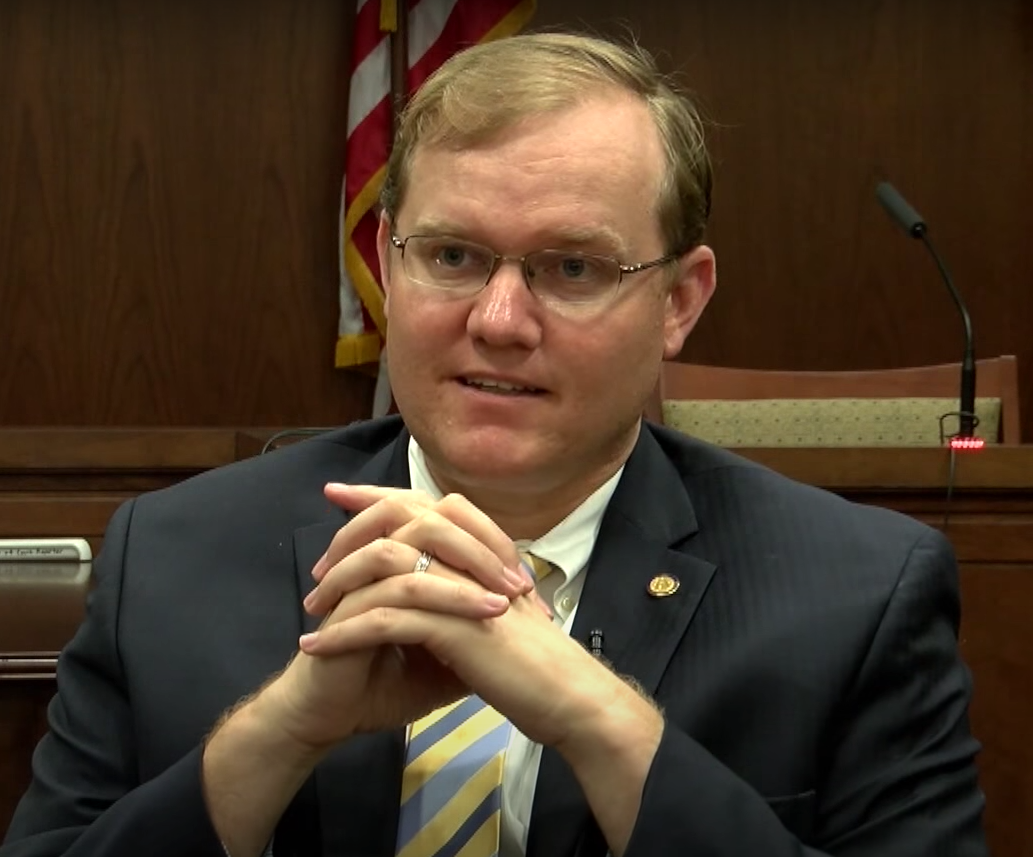

Chief Judge of the Georgia Court of Appeals
- In office July 1, 2021 – July 1, 2023
- Preceded by: Christopher J. McFadden
- Succeeded by: Amanda H. Mercier

Judge of the Georgia Court of Appeals
- In office January 1, 2016 – July 2026
- Appointed by: Nathan Deal
- Preceded by: Position established
- Succeeded by: Brian Epps

District Attorney for the Mountain Judicial Circuit of Georgia
- In office 2008–2016
- Appointed by: Sonny Perdue
- Preceded by: Michael H. Crawford
- Succeeded by: George R. Christian

Personal details
- Born: Brian Matthew Rickman; February 17, 1977 (age 49) Madison County, Georgia, U.S.
- Spouse: Maggie
- Education: Piedmont College (BA); University of Georgia (JD)

Brian Matthew Rickman (born February 17, 1977) is an American lawyer and judge from Georgia. He served as the chief judge of the Georgia Court of Appeals from 2021 to 2023.

== Education ==
Rickman was born in Madison County, Georgia. He earned his Bachelor of Arts from Piedmont College and received his Juris Doctor from the University of Georgia School of Law.

== Legal career ==
He began his legal career as an assistant district attorney for the Alcovy Judicial and Mountain Judicial Circuits of Georgia. From 2004 to 2008, he was a partner with the law firm Stockton & Rickman, LLC.

Rickman was appointed as district attorney for the Mountain Judicial Circuit by Governor Sonny Perdue from January 2, 2008 until his appointment. He previously served as a district attorney's office investigator. In May 2015, Governor Deal appointed him to serve on the Georgia Commission on Medical Cannabis.

== Appointment to Georgia Court of Appeals ==
In early October 2015 Rickman was one of 11 individuals under consideration for appointment to the court of appeals. On October 29, 2015 Governor Nathan Deal announced the appointment of Rickman to the Georgia Court of Appeals, for a term beginning January 1, 2016. He was sworn into office by Governor Deal on December 29, 2015. On June 24, 2021, he was sworn in as Chief Judge for a term commencing July 1, 2021, and served until July 1, 2023. He resigned from the court in July 2026 in order to return to private practice.

== Personal ==
He and his wife, Maggie, have two children and reside in Tiger, Georgia.

Legal offices
Preceded by Position established	Judge of the Georgia Court of Appeals; 2016–2026	Succeeded by Brian Epps
Preceded by Christopher J. McFadden	Chief Judge of the Georgia Court of Appeals; 2021–2023	Succeeded by Amanda H. Mercier
