= Mary C. Johnson =

American lawyer

Mary Campbell Johnson was one of the first three females to practice law in Georgia.

Johnson was born around 1880 in New York. She was married to Minton Rollingsworth Johnson, who worked as a customs collector at the port of Brunswick. They both studied law together and Johnson's husband was admitted to practice law in 1915. Since women were not permitted to take the examinations, Johnson had to wait until a legislative act was passed in order to give women that right.

Once the law changed, Johnson passed her examination, and was admitted to practice law in Georgia in 1916. Johnson was the third woman, as she was preceded by Minnie Anderson Hale and Betty Reynolds Cobb respectively that same year.

== See also ==
- List of first women lawyers and judges in Georgia
