= 1992 Georgia state elections =

1992 Georgia elections
- November 3, 1992

== Federal elections ==
=== President ===
Democratic Arkansas governor Bill Clinton won Georgia, flipping the state for Democrats for the first time since 1980, when it voted for Jimmy Carter.

=== Congressional elections ===
Incumbent Democratic senator Wyche Fowler won the most votes, but was defeated in a runoff by Republican Paul Coverdell. Democrats lost two seats but retained a majority in Georgia's congressional delegation.

== State elections ==
=== Labor Commissioner special ===
A special election was held for Labor Commissioner following the 1990 resignation of Joe Tanner. Former Georgia Secretary of State David Poythress defeated incumbent Labor Commissioner Al Scott in the Democratic primary, and went on to defeat Republican Bill Flaherty and Libertarian Toby Nixon in the general special election. Flaherty sued Poythress in DeKalb County Superior Court over the use of the straight ticket device in the ballot.

=== Public Service Commission ===
Republican incumbent Bobby Baker led the first round in the general election against Democrat John Frank Collins and Libertarian Jack Aiken, and went on to defeat Collins in the runoff.

=== Georgia General Assembly ===
Members were elected to the 142nd Georgia General Assembly.
