= Ed Lindsey =

American politician

Edward Lindsey

Majority Whip of the Georgia House of Representatives
- In office January 11, 2010 – January 14, 2013

Member of the Georgia House of Representatives from the 54th district
- In office January 13, 2005 – July 2, 2014
- Preceded by: Sally Harrell
- Succeeded by: Beth Beskin

Personal details
- Born: Edward Harman Lindsey, Jr. December 5, 1958 (age 67) Atlanta, Georgia, U.S.
- Party: Republican
- Spouse: Elizabeth
- Children: Harman; Charlie; Zack
- Education: Davidson College (B.A.); University of Georgia (J.D.)
- Profession: Lawyer

Edward Harman Lindsey Jr. (born December 5, 1958) is an American attorney and former member of the Georgia House of Representatives. He represented the 54th district which covered parts of Fulton County, and the Republican Party. Lindsey served as the House Majority Whip. Previously, he served as the chair of the House Appropriations Sub Committee on Education from 2009 to 2010. He unsuccessfully ran for the Georgia's 11th congressional district in 2014. Later that year, he stepped down from his state house seat to join a special committee to solve Georgia's transportation issues.

== Early life, education, and professional career ==
Lindsey was born in Atlanta, Georgia. He graduated from Northside High School in Atlanta, Georgia. He earned a degree in history from Davidson College, and a Juris Doctor from the University of Georgia School of Law. He began his legal career practicing law in Toccoa, Georgia.

Later, Lindsey and three partners moved to Atlanta to start their own firm, Goodman McGuffey Lindsey & Johnson, LLP, in 1990. Today the firm represents individuals in 4 states and employees over 80 individuals. The firm has offices in Georgia, Florida, South Carolina, and North Carolina.

== Electoral history ==
=== Georgia State Senate (2000) ===
In 2000, Lindsey ran for the Georgia State Senate and lost narrowly in the Republican primary.

=== Georgia House of Representatives (2004 to 2012) ===
In 2004, he first ran for the Georgia House of Representatives in a North Fulton County district and won. He served five terms in the House. In his last two terms (2010–2013) he was elected Majority Whip by his fellow legislators. From 2006 to 2010, he ran unopposed his state house seat. In 2012, he received a Democratic challenger for the first time since 2004 and won his re-election with 63% of the vote.

=== US House of Representatives (2014) ===
On April 11, 2013, Lindsey announced that he would be a candidate for the United States House of Representatives for Georgia's 11th congressional district. Incumbent Congressman Phil Gingrey was not seeking reelection. Lindsey received the most endorsements from locally elected officials, including Cherokee County Sheriff Roger Garrison, Bartow County state Representative Paul Battles, and Sandy Springs Mayor Rusty Paul. He lost the primary, finishing fourth.

== Georgia House of Representatives (2005 to 2014) ==
Lindsey was first elected in 2004 to the House of Representatives and served until July 2, 2014 when he stepped down from his seat to serve on a special committee to explore solutions to Georgia's transportation issues. Lindsey played a key role in several major decisions in the state capitol including Criminal Justice Reform, Healthcare Reform, 2010 Redistricting, Charter School reform, and Illegal Immigration reform.

=== Legislation ===
As a Representative, Lindsey sponsored 36 bills which passed out of the Georgia House of Representatives and became law, including: [13]

==== 152nd Georgia General Assembly (2013–2014) ====
- HB 707/943 – The Georgia Health Care Freedom and ACA Noncompliance Act (Co-Sponsor): The bill bars the use of state and local tax dollars from being utilized to administer the federal Affordable Care Act. The original bill (HB 707) was eventually attached to HB 943 through the “Lindsey Amendment.”
- HB 973 – Medicaid False Claims Act (Sponsor): This bill updates and expands the Georgia Medicaid False Claims Act which Rep. Lindsey originally sponsored in 2007.
- HB 141 – Assisting Victims of Human Trafficking in obtaining help (Sponsor): In 2001, Georgia made a giant leap forward in the passage of HB 200 to attack the horrible crime of human trafficking. This hear, HB 141 is an additional step in the right direction by requiring places where the victims of human trafficking are likely to be found such as bars, hotels, bus stations, and massage parlors to post a notice developed by the GBI alerting the victims of a 1-800 hotline number that can provide immediate law enforcement and social services help to the victims. The program is already operating in twelve other states and has helped thousands of victims escape from the dark web of this 21st century form of slavery.
- HB 361 & HB 362/HB 179 – Strengthening Georgia's Right to Work Laws (Sponsor): Georgia has economically benefited from its Right to Work policy and other states such as Indiana and Michigan are beginning to also recognize its benefit. HB 361 and HB 362/SB 179 strengthen this policy. HB 361 allows workers to leave a union at any time and stop payroll deductions immediately if they feel the union is unresponsive to their needs. HB 362/SB179 bars the state or any local government from mandating that a bidder on a public works project use union labor. (HB 362 passed the House and was then attached to SB 179 which passed both chambers.)

==== 151st Georgia General Assembly (2011–2012) ====
- HR 1162/HB 744 – State Charter Schools (Co-Sponsor): This constitutional amendment and enabling legislation will make it easier to create charter schools in Georgia and provide parents and children greater choices and education opportunities.
- HB 1176 – Criminal Justice Reform (Co-Sponsor): This legislation makes it easier for the criminal justice system in Georgia to distinguish and treat differently those we are afraid of versus those that we are merely mad at. We should always have space in our prisons for those violent and dangerous criminals that seek to do us harm. However, a great many criminals –particularly –drug offenders should be dealt with through alternative sentencing programs that focus on rehabilitation and recovery. This legislation is an important step forward in that effort.
- HB 87 – Illegal Immigration Reform and Enforcement Act (Co-Sponsor): This legislation requires employers to use e verify to confirm legal status of all job applicants and toughens sanctions against illegal aliens to protect citizens and legal residents in Georgia.
- HB 232 – Ethics Reform (Sponsor): This legislation clarifies and distinguishes between what constitutes lobbying in Georgia as opposed to ordinary citizens exercising their First Amendment rights to petition their government.

==== 150th Georgia General Assembly (2009–2010) ====
- HB 233 – Moratorium on Property Reassessment Increases (Sponsor): This legislation imposes a three-year moratorium on increased property reassessments for tax purposes to protect property owners during the current economic crisis.

==== 149th Georgia General Assembly (2007–2008) ====
- HB 551 – Georgia False Medicare/Medicaid Claims Act (Sponsor): This legislation provides for civil remedies to sue those entities which engage in fraudulent Medicare/Medicaid activity.
- HB 369 – Child Custody Reform (Co-Sponsor): This legislation provides for greater definition of what constitutes the "best interest of the child," encourages greater cooperation between the parents, requires expedited rulings in contested custody cases, and allows for direct appeal of child custody orders.

==== 148th Georgia General Assembly (2005–2006) ====
- HB 37 – City of Sandy Springs (Co-Sponsor): This legislation finally allows for the creation of the City of Sandy Springs.
- SB 100 – Georgia Residential Mortgage Fraud Act (House Sponsor): This legislation gives the Georgia Attorney General the power to investigate and prosecute mortgage fraud and provide for enhanced penalties under Georgia's RICO statute

== Awards and recognition ==
=== State legislator ===
In the state legislature, among many others, Lindsey was named the Georgia Chamber of Commerce and National Federation of Independent Business Legislator of the Year in 2013. Additionally, James Magazine recognizes him as one of Georgia's most influential legislators.

=== Legal profession ===
Lindsey has been recognized by Atlanta Magazine as a Georgia "Super Lawyer", and the Atlanta Business Chronicle as one of the leading lawyers in Atlanta. In 2009, he received the Atlanta Bar Association Distinguished Service Award.

== Personal life ==
Lindsey, and his wife Elizabeth, married over 25 years ago and reside in the Brookhaven community in Atlanta, Georgia. Elizabeth practices family law in Atlanta and is a member of their church’s vestry. They have 3 college aged children, Harman (US Military Academy), Charlie (University of Georgia), and Zack (University of Georgia School of Law, magnum cum laude).
