= Smith, Gambrell & Russell =

International law firm based in Atlanta, Georgia

- Headquarters: Atlanta, Georgia
- Offices: 14
- No. of attorneys: Almost 400
- Key people: Stephen M. Forte (Managing Partner, Executive Committee Chairman)
- Date founded: 1893
- Founders: Alexander & Victor Smith
- Company type: Limited liability partnership
- Website: sgrlaw.com

Smith, Gambrell & Russell (abbreviated SGR; also known as Smith Gambrell) is an American law firm originally founded in Atlanta, Georgia in 1893. As of 2024, it has offices in eleven cities in the United States: Atlanta; Austin; Charlotte; Chicago; Jacksonville; Los Angeles; Miami; New York; Springfield; Tampa; and Washington, D.C. It also has three offices in other countries: one in London, England, one in Southampton, England, and one in Munich, Germany.

== History ==
Smith, Gambrell & Russell was founded in 1893, originally under the name "Alexander & Victor Smith", by two Atlanta lawyers named Alexander Smith & Victor Smith. In 1909, Alex Smith Jr. joined the firm, which was then named Smith, Hammond, & Smith. In 1939, E. Smythe Gambrell became a partner at the firm Gambrell & White. In 1948, Harold L. Russell became a named partner at this firm, which by then had been renamed Gambrell, Harlan, Barwick & White. Meanwhile, the law firm Smith, Hammond, & Smith had also been renamed multiple times; by 1949, it had been renamed Smith, Partridge, Field & Doremus. In 1966, this firm, now named Smith, Ringel, Martin & Lowe, merged with Cohen, Kohler, Barnwell & Chambers to form Smith, Cohen, Ringel, Kohler & Martin. In 1984, Smith, Cohen, Ringel, Kohler & Martin merged with Gambrell & Russell to form Smith, Gambrell & Russell.

=== Recent mergers ===
In recent years, Smith, Gambrell & Russell has undergone multiple additional mergers. For example, on April 1, 2022, it entered the Chicago market for the first time by merging with Figliulo & Silverman, a Chicago-based law firm which focused on business and real estate disputes. Similarly, the following year, Smith Gambrell merged with Chicago-based law firm Freeborn & Peters. This increased Smith Gambrell's size from about 290 attorneys to about 400, and from 12 offices to 14. The resulting firm was estimated to have global annual revenues of approximately US$260 million. However, though this merger did not prevent Smith Gambrell's revenues from continuing to rise in 2023, it also led to a decrease in the firm's profits for 2023 compared to previous years. In 2024, SGR announced another merger, this one with ABL Law, a Jacksonville, Florida-based firm aimed at middle-market companies.

== Notable partners ==
Notable partners at Smith Gambrell include judge Elizabeth L. Branch, who was a partner at the firm before being confirmed to the United States Court of Appeals for the Eleventh Circuit in 2018, and Leah Ward Sears, a current partner at the firm who was formerly Chief Justice of the Georgia Supreme Court.

== Recognition ==
Smith, Gambrell & Russell has been repeatedly named to U.S. News's Best Law Firms list, as well as the American Lawyer's Am Law 200 list of highest-grossing law firms in the United States.
