= Trea Pipkin =

American judge (born 1980/81)

Judge of the Georgia Court of Appeals
- Incumbent
- Assumed office April 10, 2020
- Appointed by: Brian Kemp
- Preceded by: Stephen S. Goss

Judge of the Henry County Superior Court
- In office January 2018 – March 27, 2020
- Appointed by: Nathan Deal
- Preceded by: Wade Crumbley

Personal details
- Born: 1980 or 1981 (age 45–46)
- Education: Reinhardt College; University of Georgia; Georgia State University (JD)

John A. “Trea” Pipkin III (born 1980 or 1981) is an American lawyer who has served as a judge of the Georgia Court of Appeals since 2020.

== Education ==
Pipkin earned his associate degree from Reinhardt College, a bachelor's degree from the University of Georgia, and a Juris Doctor degree from the Georgia State University College of Law.

== Legal and academic career ==
He previously served as assistant district attorney for the Flint Circuit District Attorney's Office and as an adjunct professor of law at the Emory University School of Law. He is currently an adjunct professor of law at Gordon State College.

== Judicial career ==
=== State court service ===
On December 21, 2017, Governor Nathan Deal announced Pipkin as his appointment to serve as a Superior Court Judge of the Henry County Superior Court. He succeeded Wade Crumbley who retired on December 31, 2017. Pipkin also served as Solicitor-General in McDonough, Georgia from 2012–2018.

=== Appointment to Georgia Court of Appeals ===
Pipkin was one of six applicants who applied for the vacancy on the Georgia Court of Appeals due to the death of Stephen S. Goss on August 24, 2019. On March 27, 2020, Governor Brian Kemp appointed Pipkin to the Georgia Court of Appeals. He was sworn into office on April 10, 2020.

Legal offices
Preceded by Stephen S. Goss	Judge of the Georgia Court of Appeals; 2020–present	Incumbent
