= Elizabeth Gobeil =

American judge

Judge of the Georgia Court of Appeals
- Incumbent
- Assumed office June 5, 2018
- Appointed by: Nathan Deal
- Preceded by: Elizabeth L. Branch

Personal details
- Born: Thomaston, Georgia, U.S.
- Education: Emory University (BA); University of Georgia (JD)

Elizabeth Dallas Gobeil is a Judge of the Georgia Court of Appeals.

== Early life and education ==
Gobeil was born in Thomaston, Georgia. She attended Emory University, where she graduated in 1991 with a Bachelor's of Arts degree in history. She briefly worked for the Federalist Society for Law and Public Policy Studies in Washington, DC before attending law school. She later graduated from the University of Georgia School of Law, where she was Notes Editor for The Journal of Intellectual Property Law.

== Legal career ==
She served as a senior counsel for two global pharmaceutical companies, Solivay Pharmaceuticals and UCB Inc. Before that, she was the hiring partner in the Atlanta office of Thompson Hine. She once served as an aide to the late-U.S. Senator Paul Coverdell. Her work included covering health and judiciary-related issues.

== State service ==
On November 1, 2012, she was appointed to the State Board of Workers’ Compensation by then-governor Nathan Deal, where she served until her appointment to the appeals court. She served as both director and as an Appellate Division Judge.

== Appointment to Georgia Court of Appeals ==
On May 10, 2018, Gobeil was appointed to Court of Appeals to fill the vacancy left by Elizabeth L. Branch who was appointed a federal judge. She was sworn into office on June 5, 2018.

== Electoral history ==
Gobeil ran unopposed for reelection to the Georgia Court of Appeals in 2020. She won 100% of the vote.

== Personal ==
She resides in Savannah, Georgia with her husband, Bart. She is a member of the Isle of Hope Methodist Church, and has been involved with Ronald McDonald House Charities for over 20 years.

== Memberships ==
Gobeil is a long-term Board member of the Atlanta Chapter of the Federalist Society for Law and Public Policy Studies and is active with the emerging Savannah Chapter. She is a member of the State Bar of Georgia, the Savannah Bar Association, the Lawyers Club of Atlanta, and the Statewide Opioid Taskforce.

Legal offices
Preceded by Elizabeth L. Branch	Judge of the Georgia Court of Appeals; 2018–present	Incumbent
