= Georgia Department of Natural Resources =

State natural resources agency of Georgia, U.S.

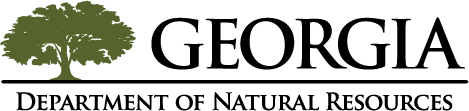

Agency overview
- Formed: April 6, 1972
- Preceding agency: 29 separate state departments, commissions, boards, and authorities
- Jurisdiction: Georgia
- Headquarters: 2 Martin Luther King Jr. Drive SE, Atlanta, Georgia 30334
- Employees: 1,717 full-time (fiscal year 2022)
- Annual budget: approximately $344 million (fiscal year 2024)
- Agency executive: Walter Rabon, Commissioner
- Parent agency: Government of Georgia
- Child agencies: Coastal Resources Division; Environmental Protection Division; Law Enforcement Division; Parks, Recreation and Historic Sites Division; Wildlife Resources Division
- Website: gadnr.org

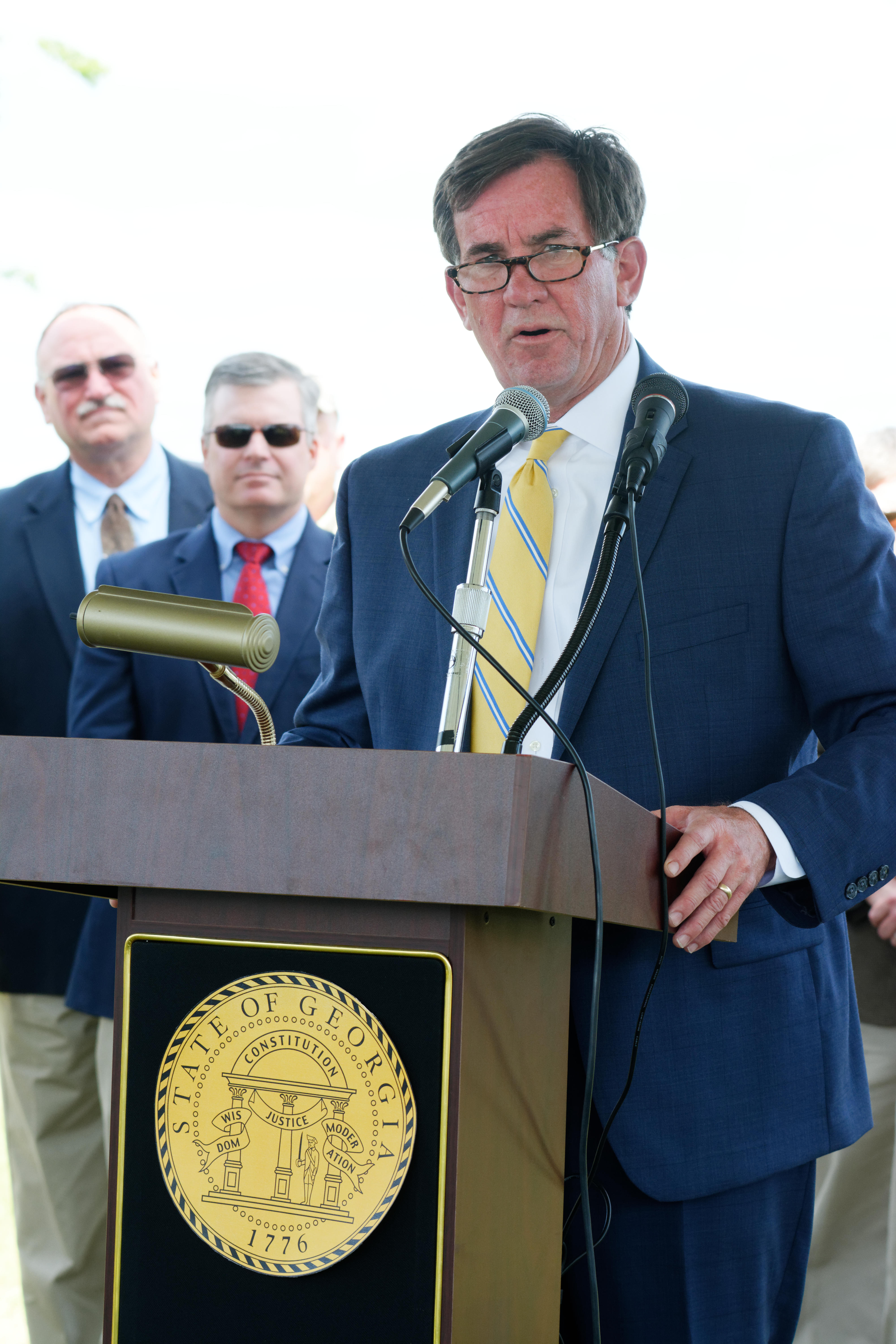
Mark Williams, who served as DNR commissioner from 2010 to 2023, pictured in 2017

The Georgia Department of Natural Resources (DNR) is an administrative agency of the U.S. state of Georgia responsible for the management and conservation of the state's natural, historic, and cultural resources. The agency was created in 1972 as part of a sweeping reorganization of Georgia's executive branch under Governor Jimmy Carter and is headed by a commissioner who is appointed by the agency's governing board.

== History ==
The DNR was established on April 6, 1972, when Governor Jimmy Carter signed the Executive Reorganization Act of 1972, which consolidated dozens of separate Georgia state departments, commissions, boards, and authorities into a smaller number of unified agencies. Joe Tanner, who helped draft the reorganization, became the department's first commissioner and is credited with consolidating dozens of state agencies into the new department. The same legislation created the Environmental Protection Division (EPD) within DNR, absorbing the responsibilities of the former Georgia Water Quality Control Board along with water-supply, air-quality, solid-waste, and land-reclamation functions previously housed in the State Health Department.

During Tanner's tenure, the department helped pass the Shore Protection Law, the Marshlands Protection Act, and the Heritage Trust Act of 1975, the last of which protected natural areas including Sapelo Island and Ossabaw Island. Following the 1977 collapse of a dam at Toccoa Falls College, which killed 39 people, the department was instrumental in the passage of Georgia's Safe Dams Act, which strengthened state dam-safety regulation.

J. Leonard Ledbetter succeeded Tanner as commissioner in 1984 and served until Tanner returned to the post in 1990; Ledbetter is confirmed as commissioner in a January 1985 official state directory.

In 2020, the Georgia General Assembly passed Senate Bill 473, transferring the Historic Preservation Division's duties, staff, and a related state grant program from DNR to the Georgia Department of Community Affairs (DCA); the bill was signed into law on June 29, 2020 (Act 381), effective July 1, 2020. Historic preservation in Georgia, including the state's role as the federally designated State Historic Preservation Office, is now administered by DCA's Historic Preservation Division.

In the 2020s, DNR's Environmental Protection Division drew national attention over its handling of a permit application by Twin Pines Minerals, an Alabama company, to mine for titanium and other heavy minerals on Trail Ridge near the Okefenokee Swamp and Okefenokee National Wildlife Refuge. EPD issued draft permits for the project in February 2024 after a lengthy public-comment process, but a final decision was repeatedly delayed. In June 2025, Twin Pines agreed to sell roughly 8,000 acres of the proposed mine site, along with its mineral rights, to the nonprofit Conservation Fund for nearly $60 million, effectively ending the mining proposal.

== Organization ==
=== Commissioner ===
DNR is headed by a commissioner, who is appointed by the department's governing board, subject to the approval of the governor, and who directs the agency's day-to-day operations. The current commissioner is Walter Rabon, who began his DNR career in 1993 as a game warden, rose through the Law Enforcement Division to become deputy commissioner in 2015, and was appointed the department's seventh commissioner on August 22, 2023, succeeding Mark Williams.

=== Board of Natural Resources ===
The Board of Natural Resources consists of 19 citizens appointed by the governor and confirmed by the state senate. Under O.C.G.A. § 12-2-24, the board sets general agency policy and adopts administrative rules but does not manage the department's daily operations, which is the responsibility of the commissioner. Subject to the governor's approval, the board appoints both the commissioner and the director of the Environmental Protection Division, and it approves the appointment of the department's other division directors.

=== Divisions ===
DNR carries out most of its statutory responsibilities through five operating divisions:

- Coastal Resources Division – based in Brunswick, administers permitting under the Coastal Marshlands Protection Act and Shore Protection Act, monitors coastal water quality, and manages marine fisheries and shellfish harvest areas.
- Environmental Protection Division – regulates air quality, water quality, hazardous and solid waste, water supply, and surface mining under state and delegated federal authority.
- Law Enforcement Division – enforces wildlife, boating, and natural-resources laws statewide through its game wardens.
- Parks, Recreation and Historic Sites Division – manages Georgia's state parks and historic sites.
- Wildlife Resources Division – regulates hunting, fishing, and boating and manages game and non-game wildlife populations.

A sixth division, the Historic Preservation Division, was part of DNR until its functions were transferred by statute to the Department of Community Affairs in 2020 (see History).

=== Law Enforcement Division rank structure ===
The Law Enforcement Division's sworn personnel follow this rank structure, from highest to lowest:

- Colonel
- Lieutenant Colonel
- Major
- Captain
- Lieutenant
- Sergeant
- Corporal
- Game Warden First Class
- Game Warden Second Class
- Game Warden II
- Game Warden I
- Probationary Game Warden
- Recruit

The division is headquartered in Social Circle, Georgia.

== Mission ==
DNR's stated mission is to "sustain, enhance, protect and conserve Georgia's natural, historic and cultural resources for present and future generations, while recognizing the importance of promoting the development of commerce and industry that utilize sound environmental practices."

== List of commissioners ==
The department has had seven commissioners since its creation in 1972.

- Joe Tanner (1972–1984, 1990–1995)
- J. Leonard Ledbetter (1984–1990)
- Lonice C. Barrett (1995–2004)
- Noel Z. Holcomb (2004–2009)
- Chris Clark (2009–2010)
- Mark Williams (2010–2023)
- Walter Rabon (2023–present)

== See also ==
- Geologic map of Georgia – produced by the Georgia Department of Natural Resources
- List of state and territorial fish and wildlife management agencies in the United States
- List of law enforcement agencies in Georgia
