= Joe Tanner (Georgia politician) =

Joseph Delano "Joe" Tanner (b. February 28, 1938 in Twin City, Georgia - d. November 27, 2024) was an American politician. In 1972, he was appointed by Governor Jimmy Carter as the first commissioner of the Georgia Department of Natural Resources. He served as DNR Commissioner from 1972 to 1984, and again from 1990 to 1995. Under his tenure, 38 state agencies were consolidated under DNR, and several laws were enforced, including the Shore Protection Law, Marshlands Protection Act, and the Heritage Trust Act of 1975. He was appointed as Georgia Labor Commissioner in 1984, and subsequently won election in 1986 and 1990. Despite winning the 1990 election unopposed, he resigned from the position to return to the DNR Commissioner position, and was succeeded by Ray Hollingsworth. He died at the age of 86.
