= M. Yvette Miller =

American judge

Chief Judge of the Georgia Court of Appeals
- In office January 1, 2009 – January 1, 2011

Judge of the Georgia Court of Appeals
- In office July 12, 1999 – December 31, 2024
- Appointed by: Roy Barnes
- Succeeded by: Jeffrey Davis

Judge of the Fulton County State Court
- In office 1996–1999

Personal details
- Born: Mildred Yvette Miller; June 21, 1955 (age 70) Macon, Georgia
- Education: Mercer University (B.A.); Walter F. George School of Law (J.D.); Emory University School of Law (LL.M); University of Virginia School of Law (LL.M)

Mildred Yvette Miller-Larche (born June 21, 1955) is an American lawyer and jurist who served as a Judge on the Georgia Court of Appeals.

== Education ==
Miller earned her Bachelor of Arts from Mercer University, graduating cum laude in 1977. She received her Juris Doctor from Mercer's Walter F. George School of Law in 1980. She also earned a Master of Laws in litigation from Emory University School of Law in 1988 and a Master of Laws in judicial process from the University of Virginia School of Law in 2004. She was admitted to the state bar on October 1, 1981.

== Legal career ==
Miller began her career as an assistant district attorney for Fulton County. After this, she became the senior in-house litigation counsel for the Metropolitan Atlanta Rapid Transit Authority. She then worked as the part owner, general manager and general counsel for a Ford Lincoln-Mercury car dealership. During this time, Miller also maintained a private legal practice. In 1989, she became a judge for the first time, serving as an administrative law judge for the State Board of Workers’ Compensation. Then in 1992 she was appointed to the position of director and judge of the Appellate Division of the State Board of Workers’ Compensation. In 1996, she was appointed to the Fulton County State Court, where she served as judge until her appointment to the Georgia Court of Appeals in 1999.

== Service on Georgia Court of Appeals ==
She was appointed to the Georgia Court of Appeals on July 12, 1999 by Governor Roy Barnes and became the 65th Judge on the court. She is the first African-American woman to serve on the Court as well as the first African-American woman to serve as the Court's Chief Judge. Miller was elected to the court in 2000 and re-elected in 2006, 2012, and 2018. She served as chief judge from January 1, 2009, to January 1, 2011. She was sworn in a Chief Judge on January 6, 2009.

== Consideration for Supreme Court of Georgia ==
Miller's name was among those being considered for a seat on the Supreme Court of Georgia, which ultimately went to Michael P. Boggs.
