= Todd Markle =

American judge

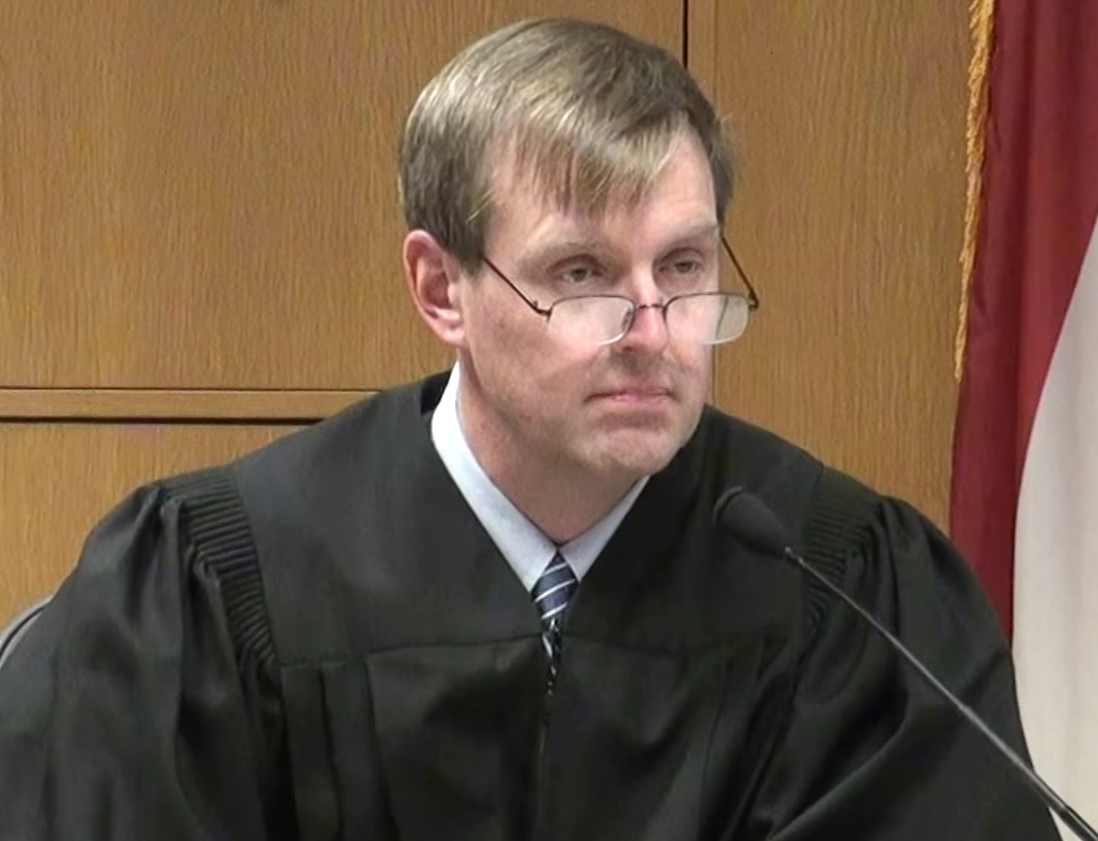

Judge of the Georgia Court of Appeals
- Incumbent
- Assumed office December 7, 2018
- Appointed by: Nathan Deal
- Preceded by: William M. Ray II

Judge of the Fulton County Superior Court
- In office August 2011 – December 2018
- Appointed by: Nathan Deal

Personal details
- Born: David Todd Markle Birmingham, Alabama
- Education: University of Georgia (A.B.); Walter F. George School of Law (J.D.)

David Todd Markle is a Judge of the Georgia Court of Appeals.

== Education ==
Markle graduated magna cum laude from the University of Georgia in 1986 and cum laude from Walter F. George School of Law in 1989.

== Legal career ==
Markle began his legal career in Atlanta in 1989. He started his own law firm in 1996 handling general civil litigation. In January 2011, he left private practice to become executive counsel to newly elected Governor Deal.

== State court service ==
In July 2011 Governor Nathan Deal appointed him as a Judge on the Atlanta Judicial Circuit, which is the Superior Court for Fulton County, Georgia.

== Appointment to Georgia Court of Appeals ==
In 2017 Markle became one of 40 potential nominees for a seat on the Georgia Court of Appeals. On December 7, 2018, he was appointed to the Court of Appeals, succeeding William McCrary Ray II, who had been confirmed as a federal judge.

Legal offices
Preceded by William M. Ray II	Judge of the Georgia Court of Appeals; 2018–present	Incumbent
