= Christopher J. McFadden =

American judge

Chief Judge of the Georgia Court of Appeals
- In office July 1, 2019 – July 1, 2021
- Preceded by: Stephen Dillard
- Succeeded by: Brian M. Rickman

Judge of the Georgia Court of Appeals
- Incumbent
- Assumed office January 1, 2011

Personal details
- Born: August 9, 1957 (age 68) Akron, Ohio
- Spouse: Linda Hyde
- Education: Oglethorpe University (B.A.); University of Georgia School of Law (J.D.)

Christopher J. McFadden (born August 9, 1957) is an American lawyer and Judge on the Georgia Court of Appeals.

== Biography ==
McFadden was born August 9, 1957, in Akron, Ohio. He received his Bachelor of Arts from Oglethorpe University in 1980 and his Juris Doctor from the University of Georgia School of Law in 1985. He practiced as a sole practitioner in Decatur from 1988 until his election to the Georgia Court of Appeals in November 2010. He is currently serving his second five-year term.

McFadden is married to Dr. Linda Hyde, Professor of Biology at Gordon State College in Barnesville, Georgia. They have a son.

Legal offices
Unknown	Judge of the Georgia Court of Appeals; 2011–present	Incumbent
Preceded by Stephen Dillard	Chief Judge of the Georgia Court of Appeals; 2019–2021	Succeeded by Brian M. Rickman
