= 2004 Georgia state elections =

2004 Georgia elections
- November 2, 2004

== State elections ==
=== Georgia General Assembly ===
Members were elected to the 148th Georgia General Assembly. Republicans won both houses (and a trifecta) for the first time since Reconstruction.

=== Ballot questions ===
- 2004 Georgia flag referendum
- 2004 Georgia Amendment 1
