= Edith Elizabeth House =

American attorney

Edith Elizabeth House (1 November 1903 – 15 December 1987) was an American attorney and one of the earliest women who graduated the University of Georgia School of Law. In 1963, she became the first woman appointed as a United States Attorney for the Southern District of Florida.

== Early life ==
House was born in 1903 in Winder, Georgia. She attended the University of Georgia School of Law and graduated in 1925 as co-valedictorian of her class. She was one of the first two female graduates of the law school, with her classmate Gussie Brooks who was technically listed as the first graduate, due to alphabetical order.

Growing up in Winder, Georgia, House had no family background in law. Her decision to pursue a legal career stemmed mostly from a desire to avoid the teaching profession, which at the time was one of the few career paths considered acceptable for women.

During her time at the University of Georgia, House served as President of the Student Government Association for Women and was a member of the Chi Omega sorority.

== Legal career ==
After graduating, House began her legal career with the law firm of Baskin and Jordan in Clearwater, Florida. In 1929, she became chief clerk for U.S. District Attorney Wilburn P. Hughes in Jacksonville, Florida. She passed the Florida Bar in 1930 and was appointed Assistant U.S. Attorney in 1931, serving in Jacksonville.

In 1955, House received a citation for 25 years of outstanding service in federal legal work. In 1960, she was appointed chief administrative aide to U.S. Attorney Coleman Madsen in Miami. Three years later, in 1963, House became the first woman to be appointed United States Attorney for the United States District Court for the Southern District of Florida. She retired from the position eight months later.

At the age of 80, she still offered free legal help to friends with minor matters.

== Legacy and recognition ==
In 1983, the University of Georgia School of Law established the Edith House Lecture Series in her honor. The inaugural lecture was delivered by Professor Nadine Taub of Rutgers Law School. The lecture series continues as an annual event, sponsored by the Women Law Students Association, focusing on issues of gender and the law.

Following her death in December 1987, a memorial scrapbook was compiled by the Women Law Students Association, ending with a tribute delivered by Gwen Wood on April 6, 1988. A second portrait of House, painted by her sister-in-law Frankie House, was donated by the House family in 1989 and is displayed on the second floor of the Law Library Annex at the University of Georgia School of Law.

While in law school, House made history as the first recipient of the institution's private financial aid endowment. After passing the bar exam, she was approached with three job offers from employers in Florida.

== Death ==
House died on 15 December, 1987 and was buried at Rose Hill Cemetery in her hometown of Winder, Georgia.
