= Amanda H. Mercier =

American judge (born 1975)

Chief Judge of the Georgia Court of Appeals
- Incumbent
- Assumed office July 1, 2023
- Preceded by: Brian M. Rickman

Judge of the Georgia Court of Appeals
- Incumbent
- Assumed office January 4, 2016
- Appointed by: Nathan Deal
- Preceded by: new seat

Personal details
- Born: 1975 (age 50–51) Cleveland, Tennessee, U.S.
- Education: University of Georgia (BA); Syracuse University (JD)

Amanda Harper Mercier (born 1975) is an American lawyer who has served as the chief judge of the Georgia Court of Appeals since July 2023.

== Early life and education ==
Mercier was born in 1975 in Cleveland, Tennessee. She received her Bachelor of Arts from the University of Georgia and her Juris Doctor from Syracuse University College of Law.

== Career ==
After graduating law school she began her career in private practice with the Law Office of David E. Ralston. Mercier practiced both criminal and civil litigation from 2001 until her appointment as a Superior Court Judge in 2010. She is a member of the Federalist Society.

=== State court service ===
She was appointed to the Appalachian Circuit bench on April 16, 2010 by Georgia Governor Sonny Perdue.

=== Georgia Court of Appeals ===
On October 29, 2015 Governor Nathan Deal announced her appointment to the Georgia Court of Appeals. She was sworn into office on January 4, 2016. She ran uncontested in the 2018 Georgia judicial elections. She was sworn in as chief judge on June 22, 2023, for a term commencing on July 1. She was re-elected on May 21, 2024. She is the fifth woman to lead the court of appeals.

== Personal life ==
Mercier has been married to her husband Joe Foster since 2001, and together they have one child, Alexandria. They reside in Blue Ridge, Georgia.

Legal offices
New seat	Judge of the Georgia Court of Appeals; 2016–present	Incumbent
Preceded by Brian M. Rickman	Chief Judge of the Georgia Court of Appeals; 2023–present	Incumbent
