= Stephen Dillard =

American lawyer and judge

Chief Judge of the Georgia Court of Appeals
- In office July 1, 2017 – June 30, 2019
- Preceded by: Sara L. Doyle
- Succeeded by: Christopher J. McFadden

Judge of the Georgia Court of Appeals
- Incumbent
- Assumed office November 1, 2010
- Appointed by: Sonny Perdue
- Preceded by: Debra Bernes

Personal details
- Born: Stephen Louis Armstrong Dillard; November 13, 1969 (age 57) Nashville, Tennessee, U.S.
- Education: Samford University (BA); Mississippi College School of Law (JD); Duke University (LLM)

Stephen Louis Armstrong Dillard (born November 13, 1969, in Nashville, Tennessee) is an appellate court judge and lecturer. In 2010, he was appointed to fill a vacant judgeship on the Georgia Court of Appeals. In 2012, he was elected to a full six-year term and was re-elected in 2018. His current term will end in 2024.

== Education ==
Dillard graduated from Samford University, the Mississippi College School of Law, and Duke University School of Law, cum laude.

== Career ==
In 1996, he was admitted to practice in Georgia, and he is an active member of the State Bar of Georgia. Dillard clerked for Judge Daniel Anthony Manion of the United States Court of Appeals for the Seventh Circuit.

Dillard practiced appellate law with the Macon, Georgia, law firm of James, Bates, Pope & Spivey LLP until receiving his judgeship appointment in 2010. He lives in Macon with his wife, the former Krista McDaniel, and their three children. On June 1, 2009, Dillard was nominated to fill a vacancy on the Supreme Court of Georgia.

On July 1, 2009, Georgia Governor Sonny Perdue's Office of Communications announced that the Georgia Judicial Nominating Commission had recommended Dillard as one of nine individuals to fill that vacancy. But in August 2009, Governor Perdue appointed Dillard instead to the Judicial Nominating Commission. In October 2010, Perdue appointed Dillard to fill one of two vacancies on the Georgia Court of Appeals. His judicial appointment ran from November 1, 2010, through December 31, 2012.

On July 31, 2012, Judge Dillard was elected by his fellow Georgians to serve a full six-year term on the Court (2013–18). On July 1, 2017, Dillard was elected by his colleagues to serve as the Court’s Chief Judge. Since joining the Court of Appeals, Dillard has spoken to numerous organizations and participated in countless seminars on a wide variety of legal topics. In 2016, Judge Dillard was appointed as the Co-Chairperson of the Georgia Judicial Council's Strategic Plan Standing Committee, and as a member of the Council's Standing Committee on Technology.

In 2015, Dillard was appointed by Governor Nathan Deal to the Georgia Appellate Jurisdiction Review Commission. He was appointed that year to serve on the Georgia Judicial Council, and as the Chairperson of the Council's Court Reporting Matters Committee. In 2014, he was named the "State Judge of the Year" by his alma mater, the Mississippi College School of Law, for outstanding judicial service and also received the "Fastcase 50" award, which honors leaders in the world of law, scholarship, and legal technology.

In 2013, he was awarded the Distinguished Judicial Service Award by the Young Lawyers Division of the State Bar of Georgia, recognizing his outstanding service on the bench and commitment to improving the practice of law. In 2012, Judge Dillard was appointed to the Code of Judicial Conduct Review Committee, and he also began serving as the Special Consultant to the Georgia High School Mock Trial Committee.

== Personal ==
Dillard is married to Krista (née McDaniel), with whom he has three children.

== Electoral history ==
2012

Georgia Court of Appeals Results, July 31, 2012
Party	Candidate	Votes	%
Nonpartisan	Stephen Dillard (incumbent)	1,168,774	99.71%
None	Write-ins	3,420	0.29%
Majority		1,165,354	99.42%
Total votes		1,172,194	100.00%

2018

Georgia Court of Appeals Results, May 22, 2018
Party	Candidate	Votes	%	±%
Nonpartisan	Stephen Dillard (incumbent)	881,916	100.00%	+0.29%
Majority		881,916	100.00%	+0.58%
Total votes		881,916	100.00%	−24.76%

== Bibliography ==
- Five essays in the Encyclopedia of Civil Liberties in America, (M.E. Sharpe, 2005)
- Griffin Bell and Antonin Scalia biographies in Great American Judges, (ABC-CLIO, 2003); and
- Kenneth Starr and Joseph Story biographies in Great American Lawyers, (ABC-CLIO, 2001)

Legal offices
Preceded by Debra Bernes	Judge of the Georgia Court of Appeals; 2010–present	Incumbent
Preceded by Sara L. Doyle	Chief Judge of the Georgia Court of Appeals; 2017–2019	Succeeded by Christopher J. McFadden
