= Sara L. Doyle =

American judge

Chief Judge of the Georgia Court of Appeals
- In office July 1, 2015 – June 30, 2017
- Succeeded by: Stephen Dillard

Judge of the Georgia Court of Appeals
- Incumbent
- Assumed office January 1, 2009

Personal details
- Born: January 2, 1968 (age 58) Dallas, Texas
- Education: University of Florida (B.A.); Walter F. George School of Law (J.D.)

Sara L. Doyle (born January 2, 1968) is a judge of the Georgia Court of Appeals.

== Early life and education ==
Doyle was born in Texas. She received her bachelor's degree in business administration from the University of Florida in 1990 and her Juris Doctor from the Walter F. George School of Law at Mercer University, graduating in 1994.

== Legal career ==
Doyle started her career as an associate with Wilson, Strickland & Benson, P.C. Before taking office, she was an equity partner and litigator with the national law firm of Holland & Knight, where she practiced law with a focus on education issues beginning in August 2000.

== Election to Georgia Court of Appeals ==
Doyle won election to the Court of Appeals on December 3, 2008. She ran for the seat of retiring Judge John H. Ruffin Jr., and took office on January 1, 2009. She was re-elected in 2014 and again in 2020. Her current term expires on December 31, 2026. She served as chief judge of the court from July 1, 2015, until June 30, 2017.

== Georgia Supreme Court ==
In April 2019, Doyle filed to run for a seat on the Georgia Supreme Court, but Justice Robert Benham retired on March 1, 2020, before his term ended, and thus the seat was filled by appointment. So Doyle instead successfully ran again for her seat on the Court of Appeals.

== Personal ==
Doyle is married to another attorney, Jay Doyle, and has two children.

Legal offices
Preceded by John H. Ruffin Jr.	Judge of the Georgia Court of Appeals; 2009–present	Incumbent
