= Beth Beskin =

American politician

Member of the Georgia House of Representatives from the 54th district
- In office January 12, 2015 – January 14, 2019
- Preceded by: Ed Lindsey
- Succeeded by: Betsy Holland

Personal details
- Born: November 24, 1959 (age 66) Baton Rouge, Louisiana
- Party: Republican

Beth Beskin (born November 24, 1959) is an American politician who served in the Georgia House of Representatives from the 54th district from 2015 to 2019. In September 2019, Beskin announced she was running for a seat on the Georgia Supreme Court.
