= Georgia Court of Appeals =

Intermediate appellate court of Georgia, United States

Court of Appeals of the State of Georgia
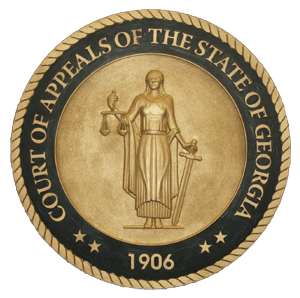
- Interactive map of Court of Appeals of the State of Georgia
- Established: October 3, 1906
- Jurisdiction: Georgia
- Location: Nathan Deal Judicial Center, Atlanta, Georgia
- Composition method: Nonpartisan election
- Authorised by: Georgia Constitution
- Appeals to: Supreme Court of Georgia
- Appeals from: Georgia superior and state courts
- Judge term length: 6 years
- Number of positions: 15
- Type of tribunal: Intermediate appellate court
- Website: gaappeals.gov

Chief Judge
- Currently: E. Trenton Brown III
- Since: 2025

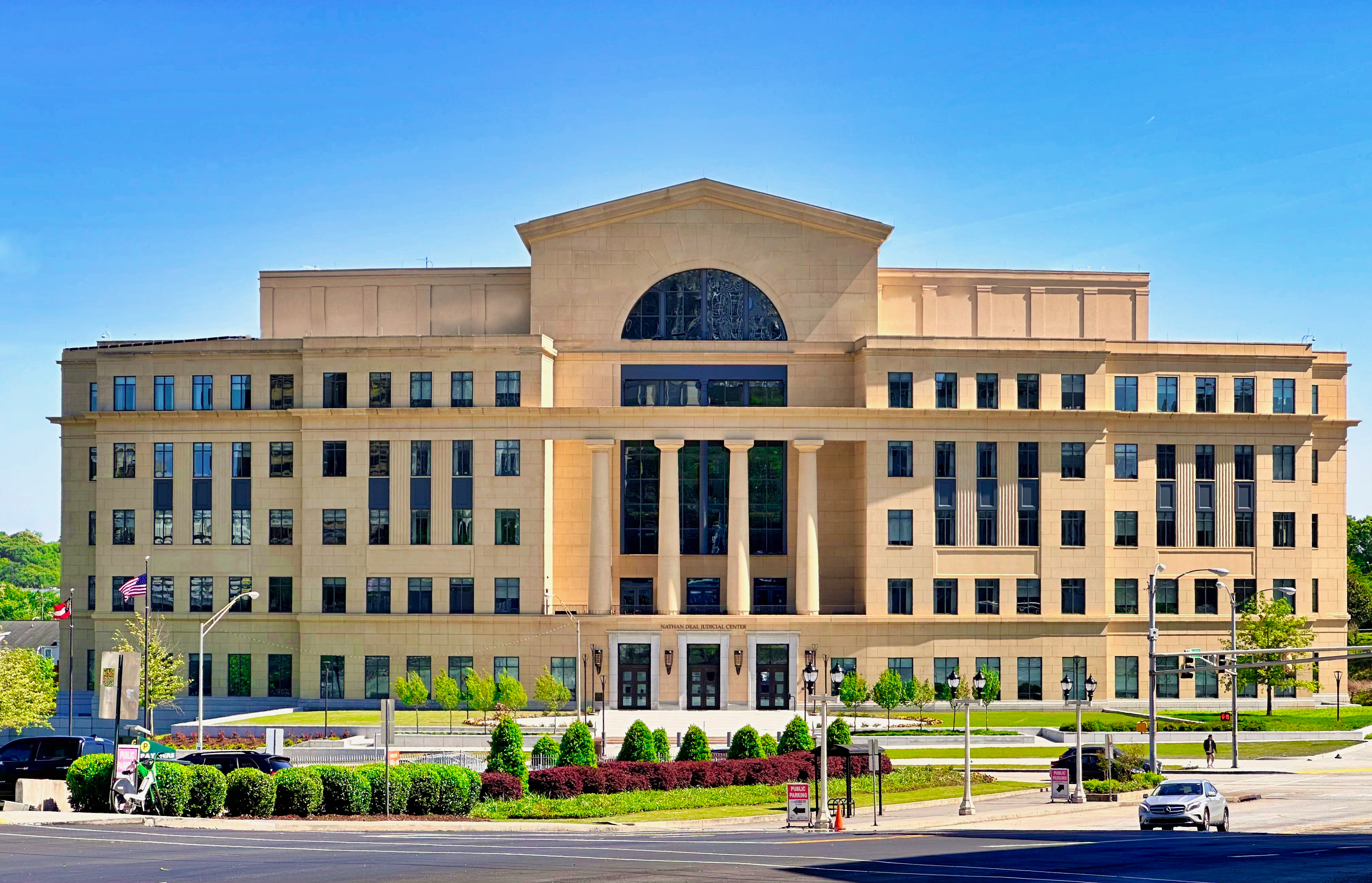
The Georgia Court of Appeals is located at the Nathan Deal Judicial Center in Atlanta, the same building that holds the Supreme Court of Georgia.

The Court of Appeals of the State of Georgia is the intermediate-level appellate court for the state of Georgia, United States. The court is a single entity with fifteen judges. The judges are assigned into five divisions of three judges each, with the assignments changed annually. Cases are randomly assigned to one of the divisions, with the constraint that the number of active cases in each division is kept close to equal. Its courtroom is on the second floor of the Nathan Deal Judicial Center in Atlanta.

== History ==
=== Founding of the court ===
The genesis of the Court of Appeals began with a report by the State Bar of Georgia in 1895, suggesting that the Georgia State Legislature create a new intermediate appellate court to relieve the Georgia Supreme Court of some of its rapidly growing caseload. The Legislature declined to create a new appellate court, choosing instead to increase the size of the Supreme Court from three judges to five, then later to six. In 1902, Georgia Supreme Court justice Andrew J. Cobb gave a presentation to the State Bar addressing a number of proposals to alleviate the Supreme Court's workload, including the creation of an intermediate court of appeals.

Finally, in 1906, the Legislature approved an amendment to the Georgia state constitution to create a three-judge court of appeals, to be placed on the ballot for approval by the citizens. The measure was approved by voters on October 3, 1906.

The first election of judges took place on November 6, 1906. Arthur G. Powell, Richard Russell Sr., and Benjamin H. Hill (the son of former U.S. Senator Benjamin Harvey Hill) were the first judges elected to the court. Hill was the first chief judge of the court; he received the position largely due to age and seniority (over Russell's objections). The first Clerk of Court was Logan Bleckley Jr., the son of former Georgia Supreme Court Chief Justice Logan Edwin Bleckley. One of the first stenographers of the court was Marian Bloodworth, whose appointment was consented to by the three judges despite a provision of the Georgia Civil Code forbidding women from holding civil office.

Until 1916, the Court of Appeals effectively functioned as a second court of last resort for the state of Georgia, there being no provision for appeal from its judgments. This posed two problems for the state: first, despite the constitutional requirement that the Supreme Court's decisions constituted binding precedent over the court of appeals, conflicts began arising between the rulings of the two courts; secondly, the workloads of both courts continued to increase steadily. The Legislature remedied these problems by approving a constitutional amendment to enlarge the subject matter jurisdiction of the Court of Appeals and limit that of the Supreme Court. The Legislature also approved a statute to create an additional three-judge division of the Court of Appeals, providing that all appeals of criminal cases be heard in one division, and the remaining civil cases be divided up so as to equalize their work.

=== Growth of the court ===
The Legislature increased the size of the court to seven judges in 1960, and then to nine judges in three divisions in 1961. The requirement for all criminal cases to be heard in one division was repealed in 1967. In 1996, Governor Zell Miller submitted a bill to increase the court's size to thirteen judges. The bill failed, but the Legislature did approve another act to add a tenth judge.

The court grew again in 1999 when Governor Roy Barnes signed a bill which increased the number of judges to twelve. The court now has 15 members, who serve in five divisions. As of 2020, a total of 92 judges have served on the court, with twenty having served on both the Court of Appeals and the Supreme Court of Georgia. In 1994, Judge Clarence Cooper was nominated by President Bill Clinton and confirmed by the Senate to serve as a United States District Judge of the United States District Court for the Northern District of Georgia. Three more Court of Appeals judges were appointed to the federal bench in 2018: Elizabeth L. Branch, to the U.S. Court of Appeals for the 11th Circuit, Tripp Self, to the United States District Court for the Middle District of Georgia, and William M. Ray II, to the United States District Court for the Northern District of Georgia.

== Jurisdiction ==
The court hears all cases in which exclusive appellate jurisdiction is not reserved to the Supreme Court of Georgia, such as first-impression constitutional issues, murder, and petitions for writs of habeas corpus.

Cases come to the Court of Appeals either by direct appeals—appeals as of right—or by granted applications for discretionary appeal—appeals the court agrees to hear. Applications for discretionary review will only be granted if reversible error appears to exist, establishment of precedent is desirable, or further development of the law is desirable, such as in divorce cases. (Court of Appeals Rule 31 (b))

In addition, certain rulings made by the trial court may be appealable even before the case is over. These interlocutory appeals can only proceed if trial court judge agrees to allow a party to petition for an appeal, and if the Court of Appeals agrees to accept the case. (Court of Appeals Rule 30)

== Procedure ==
The Court of Appeals of Georgia is one of the busiest state appellate courts in the nation. In 2019, the court disposed of 2,445 direct appeals and 836 applications, or requests to file direct appeals.

The 1996 statute that increased the number of judges to ten also changed the process by which cases would be decided in the event of a dissent. Before 1996, cases in which there was a dissent in one division were decided en banc (by the whole court). After this law was passed, cases involving a dissent were determined by seven judges, including the assigned division, the next division in succession, and the presiding judge of the next panel. The court increased to twelve judges in 1999, and to fifteen in 2016. Cases with a dissent were determined by nine judges, including the assigned division and the next two divisions in succession.

Before August 1, 2020, a case became binding precedent on all courts in Georgia except the Georgia Supreme Court only if all three panel judges agreed with the reasoning and result. If one of the three judges concurred specially (agreed with the result but not the reasoning), the ruling became "physical precedent only" – that is, it decided that particular case but could only be cited as persuasive authority, not as binding authority in subsequent cases.

Effective August 1, 2020, if a majority of judges in a published opinion fully concur in the decision's rationale and judgment, the opinion is binding. In other words, three-judge cases with a dissent or special concurrence published after August 1, 2020, are now binding authority. Some cases may be decided by all 15 judges. The court no longer issues nine-judge cases; appeals are decided by either three judges or all fifteen.

== Judges ==
The position of Chief Judge is rotated among the 15 sitting judges, generally for a two-year term and upon the basis of seniority of tenure on the Court. By statutory authorization, the Chief Judge appoints a Presiding Judge for each of the five divisions, usually the most senior judges. The other judges are assigned to the five panels annually, and serve together for three full terms of court.

As of July 2026, the judges on the Court were:

Name	Start	Term Ends	Appointer	Law School
Amanda Mercier, Chief Judge	January 4, 2016	2030	Nathan Deal (R)	Syracuse
Anne Barnes, Presiding Judge	January 1, 1999	2028	—N/a (Note: Took office after being elected in a nonpartisan election.)	Georgia
Sara Doyle, Presiding Judge	January 1, 2009	2026	—N/a	Mercer
Stephen Dillard, Presiding Judge	November 1, 2010	2030	Sonny Perdue (R)	Mississippi College
Christopher McFadden, Presiding Judge	January 1, 2011	2028	—N/a	Georgia
Trenton Brown	May 16, 2018	2026	Nathan Deal (R)	Mercer
Elizabeth Gobeil	June 5, 2018	2026	Nathan Deal (R)	Georgia
Todd Markle	December 17, 2018	2026	Nathan Deal (R)	Mercer
Ken Hodges	January 1, 2019	2030	—N/a	Georgia
Trea Pipkin	April 10, 2020	2028	Brian Kemp (R)	Georgia State
Jeffrey Watkins	July 11, 2023	2030	Brian Kemp (R)	Mercer
Wade Padgett	April 3, 2024	2026	Brian Kemp (R)	Georgia State
Jeffrey Davis	January 1, 2025	2030	—N/a	Georgia State
Paige Reese Whitaker	July 16, 2026	2028 (special)	Brian Kemp (R)	Duke
Brian Epps	August 11, 2026	2028 (special)	Brian Kemp (R)	Georgia

== See also ==
- Courts of Georgia
