= General Cramer =

General Cramer may refer to:

- Hans Cramer (1896–1968), German Wehrmacht general
- Heinz Cramer (1911–2003), German Bundeswehr brigadier general
- Kenneth F. Cramer (1894–1954), U.S. Army major general
- Myron C. Cramer (1881–1966), U.S. Army general
