= General Greene =

General Greene may refer to:

- Arthur Green (British Army officer) (born 1878), British Army brigadier general
- Douglass T. Greene (1891–1964), U.S. Army major general
- Francis Vinton Greene (1850–1921), U.S. Army general who fought in the Spanish–American War
- G. B. Greene Jr. (1914–1998), U.S. Air Force major general
- George S. Greene (1801–1899), Union general during the American Civil War
- Harold J. Greene (1959–2014), U.S. Army major general
- Henry Alexander Greene (1856–1921), U.S. Army major general
- Nathanael Greene (1742–1786), Continental Army general during the American Revolutionary War
- Wallace M. Greene (1907–2003), United States Marine Corps general, Commandant of the Marine Corps
- USS General Greene, several ships of the United States Navy
- USCGC General Greene (WPC-140), U.S. Coast Guard patrol boat

General Green may refer to:

- Charles B. Green (born 1955), U.S. Air Force lieutenant general
- Sir Charles Green, 1st Baronet (1749–1831), British Army general
- Joseph A. Green (general) (1881–1963), U.S. Army major general
- Martin E. Green (1815–1863), Confederate general during the American Civil War
- Percurt Green (born 1939), Swedish Army lieutenant general
- Thomas Green (general) (1814–1864), Confederate general during the American Civil War
- Thomas H. Green (1889–1971), U.S. Army major general
- Wilfrith Green (1872–1937), British Army brigadier general
- William Green (British Army officer, born 1882) (1882–1947), British Army major general
- Sir William Green, 1st Baronet (1725–1811), British Army general
- William Henry Rodes Green (1823–1912), British Indian Army major general
- William Wyndham Green (1887–1979), British Army lieutenant general
- USRC General Green, U.S. Revenue Cutter

== See also ==
- Attorney General Greene (disambiguation)
