= G. Edward White =

American legal historian and professor (born 1941)

George Edward White
- Born: March 19, 1941 (age 85)
- Education: Amherst College (BA); Yale University (MA, PhD); Harvard University (JD)
- Occupations: Law professor; author

George Edward White (born March 19, 1941) is an American legal historian, tort law scholar, and the David and Mary Harrison Distinguished Professor of Law at the University of Virginia School of Law.

== Education and career ==
White finished high school at Philips Academy. He then graduated with a Bachelor of Arts degree magna cum laude from Amherst College in 1963. He went on to study at Yale University, where he obtained a Master of Arts in 1964 and a Doctor of Philosophy in 1967, both in history. In 1970, White graduated from Harvard Law School with a Juris Doctor. White then clerked for Chief Justice Earl Warren in the 1971 term. White joined the faculty at the University of Virginia School of Law in 1972. At Virginia Law, he became a University Professor in 1993, then a Distinguished Professor in 2003.

White is a member of the American Law Institute, the American Academy of Arts and Sciences, and the Society of American Historians. At Virginia Law, he teaches courses in constitutional law, torts, and legal history. White was once a Guggenheim Fellow and twice a senior fellow of the National Endowment for the Humanities. Throughout his career, White has published 18 books, and won several awards for these publications, including a final listing for the Pulitzer Prize for History. White has held visiting appointments at Harvard Law School, William & Mary Law School, the London School of Economics, and elsewhere. Between 2016 and 2020, White was the fourth most cited scholar in the United States in the field of legal history. In January 2026, the Supreme Court Historical Society announced that it had appointed White the editor of the Journal of Supreme Court History.

== Personal life ==
White was born to George L. White Jr. and his wife. In December 1966, White married Susan Valre Davis, now a family attorney in Charlottesville, Virginia. Davis White is the daughter of John F. Davis, the former Clerk of the Supreme Court of the United States. White is a lifelong fan of and participant in sports and in 1996, he published a book on the history of baseball, Creating the National Pastime: Baseball Transforms Itself, 1903-1953.

== Selected publications ==
=== Books ===
- Robert H. Jackson: A Life in Judgment (Oxford University Press, 2025)
- Law in American History, Volume 3: 1930-2000 (Oxford University Press, 2019)
- Law in American History, Volume 2: From Reconstruction Through the 1920s (Oxford University Press, 2016)
- American Legal History: A Very Short Introduction (Oxford University Press, 2014)
- Law in American History: Volume 1, From the Colonial Years Through the Civil War (Oxford University Press, 2012)
- The American Judicial Tradition: Profiles of Leading American Judges (Oxford University Press, 3d ed. 2007)
- Alger Hiss’s Looking-Glass Wars (Oxford Press, paperback ed., 2005)
- Alger Hiss's Looking-Glass Wars (Oxford University Press, 2004)
- Tort Law in America: An Intellectual History (Oxford University Press, 1980; expanded ed. 2003)
- The Constitution and the New Deal (Harvard University Press, 2000)
- Oliver Wendell Holmes: Sage of the Supreme Court (Oxford University Press, 2000); also published as Oliver Wendell Holmes Jr. (Oxford University Press, 2006)
- Creating the National Pastime: Baseball Transforms Itself, 1903-1953 (Princeton University Press, 1996)
- Intervention and Detachment: Essays in Legal History and Jurisprudence (Oxford University Press, 1994)
- Justice Oliver Wendell Holmes: Law and the Inner Self (Oxford University Press, 1993)
- The Marshall Court and Cultural Change, 1815-35 (Macmillan, 1988; abridged ed. Oxford University Press, 1991)
- The Eastern Establishment and the Western Experience: The West of Frederic Remington, Theodore Roosevelt, and Owen Wister (Yale, 1968; Texas, 2d ed. 1989)
- The American Judicial Tradition: Profiles of Leading American Judges (Oxford University Press, 1976; expanded ed. 1988)
- Earl Warren: A Public Life (Oxford University Press, 1982)
- Patterns of American Legal Thought (Bobbs-Merrill, 1978)

=== Book chapters ===
- “Tracing Judicial Roles over Time,” in Robert M. Jarvis, ed., Teaching Legal History: Comparative Perspectives 257 (Wildy, Simonds & Hill, 2014).
- "The Origins of Modern American Legal History," in Daniel W. Hamilton & Alfred L. Brophy, eds., Transformations in American Legal History: Law, Ideology and Methods: Essays in Honor of Morton J. Horwitz, Volume II 48 (Harvard Law School, 2010).
- "Free Speech and the Bifurcated Review Project: The 'Preferred Position' Cases," in Sandra F. VanBurkleo, Kermit L. Hall, & Robert J. Jaczorowski, eds., Constitutionalism and American Culture: Writing the New Constitutional History 99 (University Press of Kansas, 2002).
- "Analogical Reasoning and Historical Change in Law: The Regulation of Film and Radio Speech," in Austin Sarat, ed., History, Memory and Law (1999).
- "Warren Court," in Leonard W. Levy et al., eds., 4 Encyclopedia of the American Constitution 2023 (Macmillan, 1986). Reprinted in Leonard W. Levy et al., eds., American Constitutional History 279 (Macmillan, 1989).
- "Holmes, Oliver Wendell Jr. (1841-1935)," in Leonard W. Levy et al., eds., 2 Encyclopedia of the American Constitution 920 (Macmillan, 1986).

== See also ==
- List of law clerks for the chief justice of the United States
