= Hodson Award =

American Bar Association award

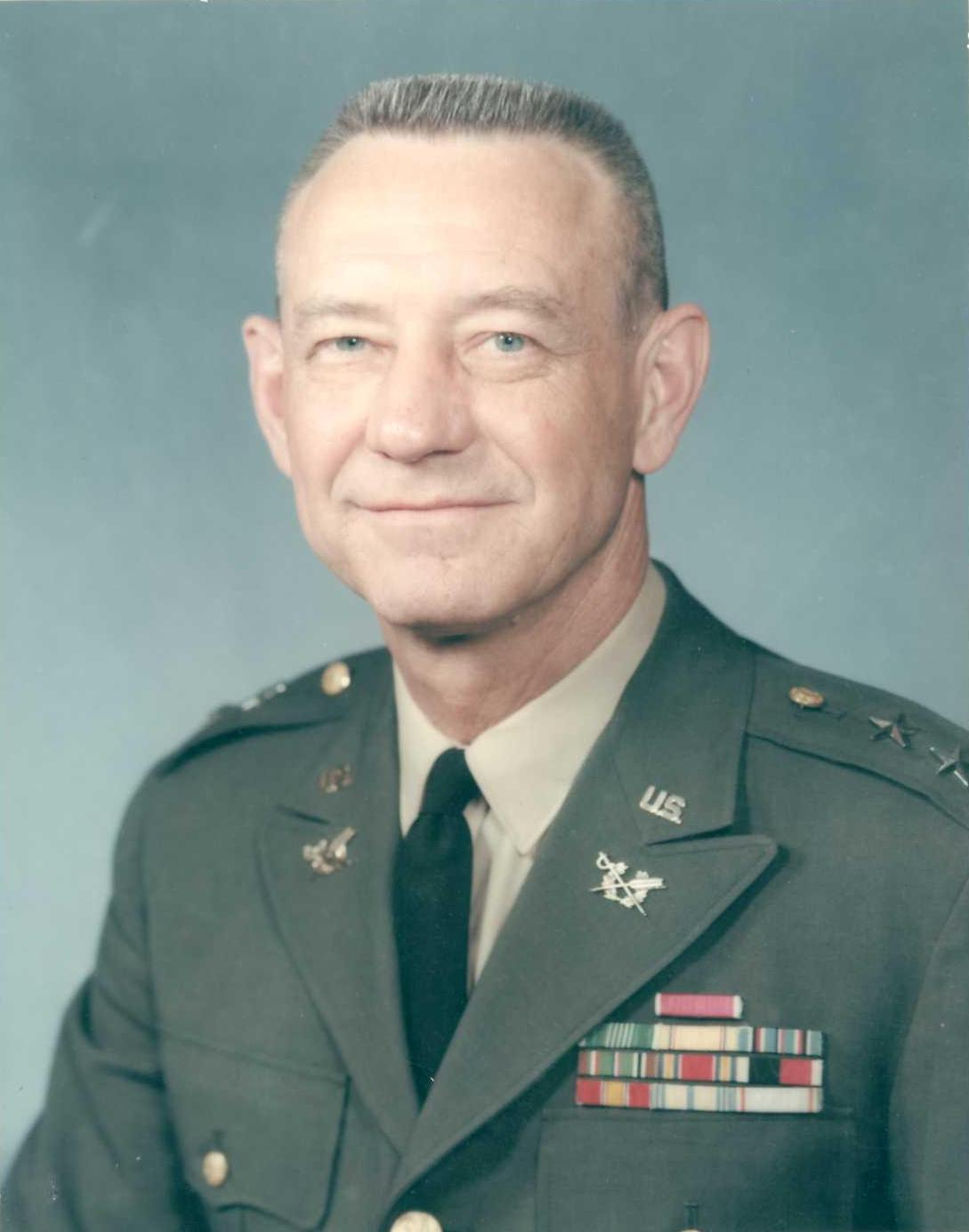
Major General Kenneth J. Hodson

The Hodson Award is an American Bar Association award for extraordinary service by a government or public-sector legal office. The recipients are chosen from all offices, bureaus, and departments within the country and range in purpose and goal.

The award is named in honor of the distinguished public service career of the late Major General Kenneth J. Hodson. He was a former member of the Judge Advocate General's Corps of the U.S. Army, and a founding member of The Government and Public Sector Lawyers Division.

== Recipients ==
- 1993- Public Protection Division of the Pennsylvania Attorney General's Office
- 1994- American Law Division, Congressional Research Service, Library of Congress, and Legal Services of Eastern Missouri, Inc.
- 1995- International and Operational Law Division, Office of the Judge Advocate General, Department of the Army
- 1996- Office of the County Attorney, Broward County, FL
- 1997- Domestic Abuse Service Center of the Hennepin County Attorney's Office, Minneapolis, MN
- 1998- Naval Legal Service Office Pacific and Office of the New York State Attorney General
- 1999- Office of the County Attorney, Montgomery County, MD
- 2000- First Infantry Division and Seventh Army Training Command's Office of the Staff Judge Advocate, and Office of Criminal Enforcement, Antitrust Division, United States Department of Justice
- 2001- San Diego Public Defender's Office
- 2002- Center for Disability and Elder Law, Chicago, IL
- 2003- California's Administrative Office of the Courts' Center for Families, Children and the Courts, San Francisco, CA
- 2004- Port Authority of New York and New Jersey Law Department
- 2005- Legal Aid of the Bluegrass, Covington, KY
- 2006- Los Angeles County District Attorney's Office Juvenile Offender Intervention Network (J.O.I.N.)
- 2007- Community Legal Services, Inc., Philadelphia, PA
- 2008- Lawyers For Children, Inc., New York, NY
- 2009- Children's Law Center of Los Angeles, Los Angeles, CA
- 2010- Legal Services Support Section, Combat Logistics Regiment-17, 1st Marine Logistics Group, and U.S. Agency for International Development, Office of General Counsel
