= Robert Graham Heiner =

American lawyer

Robert Graham Heiner (1901–1977) was a 20th-Century American law partners of Cahill, Gordon, Reindel & Ohl and president of Planned Parenthood of New York City.

== Background ==
Heiner was a Phi Beta Kappa graduate of Johns Hopkins College (as was Alger Hiss). In 1923, as a Rhodes scholar, he obtained a degree in law from Oxford University.

== Career ==
=== Private practice ===
Heiner joined the law firm of Cotton & Franklin. He became a partner and specialized in securities and international finance.

During World War II, he served as assistant general counsel in the U.S. Lend‐Lease Administration.

=== Hiss Case ===
By August 1948, Heiner had joined Cahill, Gordon, Reindel & Ohl. He was second pick for lead attorney by Alger Hiss, following allegations by Whittaker Chambers earlier that month that Hiss had been a member of the Ware Group Soviet network. First pick and fellow Baltimore lawyer and childhood friend William L. Marbury Jr. was in Geneva for a month to help negotiate the GATT. Hiss wrote Marbury to this effect on August 31, 1948. The letter documents that Hiss was trying to retain Heiner as of August 13 for his executive session with HUAC on August 16. Before that second hearing by Hiss, Heiner and colleague Jerry Doyle had advised him that their firm ("Cahill, Gordon") could not represent Hiss, as they faced possible "conflict with another government interest." As a result, Hiss had no counsel then and to scramble to find counsel for "Confrontation Day" (August 25). Hiss managed to latch onto John F. Davis, recently returned to private practice and formerly an SEC lawyer and fellow ‘’Harvard Law Review’’ member (who continued on the Hiss defense).

Cases in which he worked included United States v. Morgan, 118 F. Supp. 621 (S.D.N.Y 1953).

In 1962, he retired from Cahill, Gordon, Reindel & Ohl.

=== Planned Parenthood ===
In 1963, Heiner joined the national board of the Planned Parenthood Federation and served until 1968. In 1972, he joined as president of the New York chapter of Planned Parenthood and served until 1974.

At the time of his death, he was a trustee of the Erhman and Schimper foundations and had previously served as a trustee of Knickerbocker Hospital.

== Personal and death ==
Heiner had been a friend of Margaret Sanger.

He married twice. His first wife, Frances Eliot Cassiday, died in 1958. His second wife, Nina King Colgate, survived him. He had two children with his first wife.

He died of leukemia on July 22, 1977, at the Memorial Sloan‐Kettering Cancer Center, aged 76.

== See also ==
- Planned Parenthood
- Cahill Gordon & Reindel
- Alger Hiss
