= Harold B. Willey =

American lawyer and Supreme Court clerk

Clerk of the Supreme Court of the United States
- In office 1952–1956
- Preceded by: Charles Elmore Cropley
- Succeeded by: John T. Fey

Personal details
- Occupation: Lawyer

Harold B. Willey was an American lawyer who served as the clerk of the Supreme Court of the United States from 1952 to 1956.

Willey spent much of his professional career working for the Supreme Court, where he served for 32 years. He began his tenure as an Assistant Clerk in 1924, and then served as Deputy Clerk under Clerk Charles Elmore Cropley from 1941 to 1952. During 1945–1946, Willey served as General Secretary to the American delegation to the Nuremberg trials, where Supreme Court Justice Robert H. Jackson was acting as a prosecutor.

Willey succeeded Cropley as Clerk upon Cropley's retirement in 1952, and held the office for four years. During this period, Willey served as a key member of a committee that substantially revised the Court's Rules, effective in 1954. Willey retired in 1956 and was succeeded by John T. Fey.
