= Clyde J. Tate II =

American military lawyer

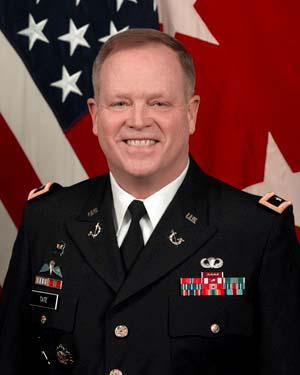
- Major General Clyde J. Tate II; 19th Deputy Judge Advocate General of the United States Army
- Born: 1957 (age 68–69)
- Military career
- Allegiance: United States of America
- Branch: United States Army
- Service years: 1979 – 2013
- Rank: Major General
- Nickname: Butch
- Conflicts: War on terror
- Awards: Legion of Merit; Bronze Star Medal; Meritorious Service Medal

Major General Clyde J. "Butch" Tate II, USA (born 1957) is an American military lawyer who previously served as the 19th Deputy Judge Advocate General of the United States Army. Major General Tate graduated from the University of Kansas in 1979, receiving a commission through R.O.T.C. as a Second Lieutenant in the U.S. Army. He deferred entry to active duty in order to attend the University of Kansas School of Law. Major General Tate also holds master's degrees in Military Law and National Security Strategy. He attended the Judge Advocate Basic and Graduate Courses, the Army Command and General Staff College, and the National War College.

== Military career ==
Major General Tate has held a variety of positions, including:

Senior Trial Counsel, 82nd Airborne Division; Officer in Charge, Panzer Kaserne Legal Center, 1st Infantry Division (Forward), Boeblingen, Germany; Professor of Criminal Law, The Judge Advocate General's School, Army; Deputy Staff Judge Advocate, U.S. Army Special Forces Command; Chief of Administrative Law, U.S. Special Operations Command; Staff Judge Advocate, 82nd Airborne Division; Chief, Personnel, Plans, and Training Office (PPTO), Office of The Judge Advocate General; Legal Counsel, Army Office of the Chief, Legislative Liaison; Staff Judge Advocate, III Corps and Fort Hood, Texas; Staff Judge Advocate, Multi-National Corps – Iraq (MNC-I), Baghdad; Commanding General and Commandant, The Judge Advocate General's Legal Center and School (TJAGLCS), Charlottesville, Virginia; and Chief Judge, U.S. Army Court of Criminal Appeals (ACCA); and Commander, U.S. Army Legal Services Agency (USALSA).

Major General Tate's decorations include the Legion of Merit with four Bronze Oak Leaf Clusters, Bronze Star Medal, Meritorious Service Medal with one Silver Oak Leaf Cluster, Army Commendation Medal, and Army Achievement Medal. He is also entitled to wear the U.S. Army Parachutist Badge, numerous foreign airborne badges, and the Army Staff Identification Badge.

== Gallery ==
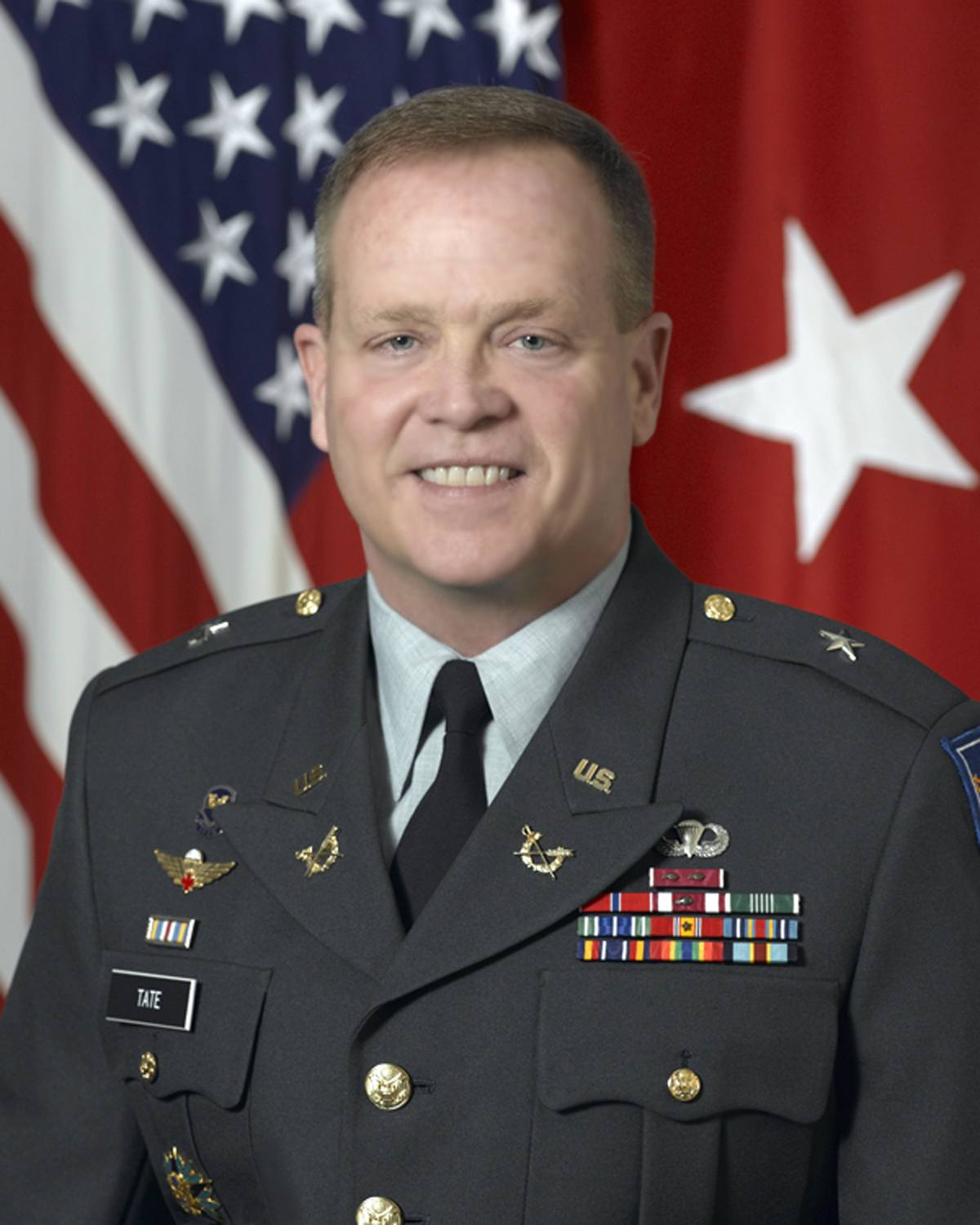

Military offices
Preceded by Daniel V. Wright	Deputy Judge Advocate General of the United States Army; 2009 – 2013	Succeeded by Thomas E. Ayres
