= William K. Suter =

United States Army general

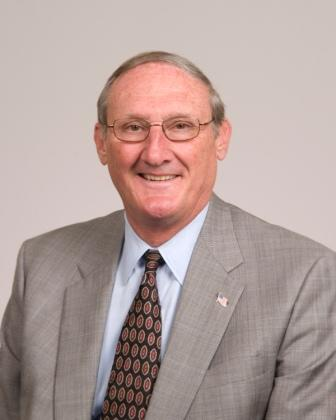
- Official portrait, 2007

19th Clerk of the Supreme Court of the United States
- In office February 1, 1991 – August 31, 2013
- Preceded by: Joseph F. Spaniol Jr.
- Succeeded by: Scott S. Harris

Personal details
- Born: William Kent Suter; August 24, 1937 (age 89) Portsmouth, Ohio, U.S.
- Spouse: Jeanie Suter
- Education: Trinity University (BA); Tulane University (JD)

Military service
- Branch/service: United States Army
- Years of service: 1962–1991
- Rank: Major General
- Commands: J.A.G. Corps
- Battles/wars: Vietnam War; Gulf War
- Awards: Dist. Service Medal; Bronze Star Medal; Merit. Service Medal

William Kent Suter (born August 24, 1937) is an American jurist who served as the 19th Clerk of the Supreme Court of the United States, a position he held for twenty-two years. Prior to this, he was a major general in the United States Army; at the time of his retirement in 1991, he had served for over a year as the acting Judge Advocate General.

== Early life and education ==
Born in Portsmouth, Ohio, Suter was raised in Millersburg, Kentucky, where he attended the Millersburg Military Institute from grades 1 to 12. A talented basketball player, he received a scholarship to attend Trinity University in San Antonio, eventually obtaining a B.A. degree from there in 1959. Deciding to pursue a J.D. degree, Suter took advantage of an academic scholarship from the Tulane University School of Law, graduating in 1962. He served on the Tulane Law Review Board of Editors and was elected to the Order of the Coif. That same year, he was admitted to the Louisiana State Bar.

== Army career ==
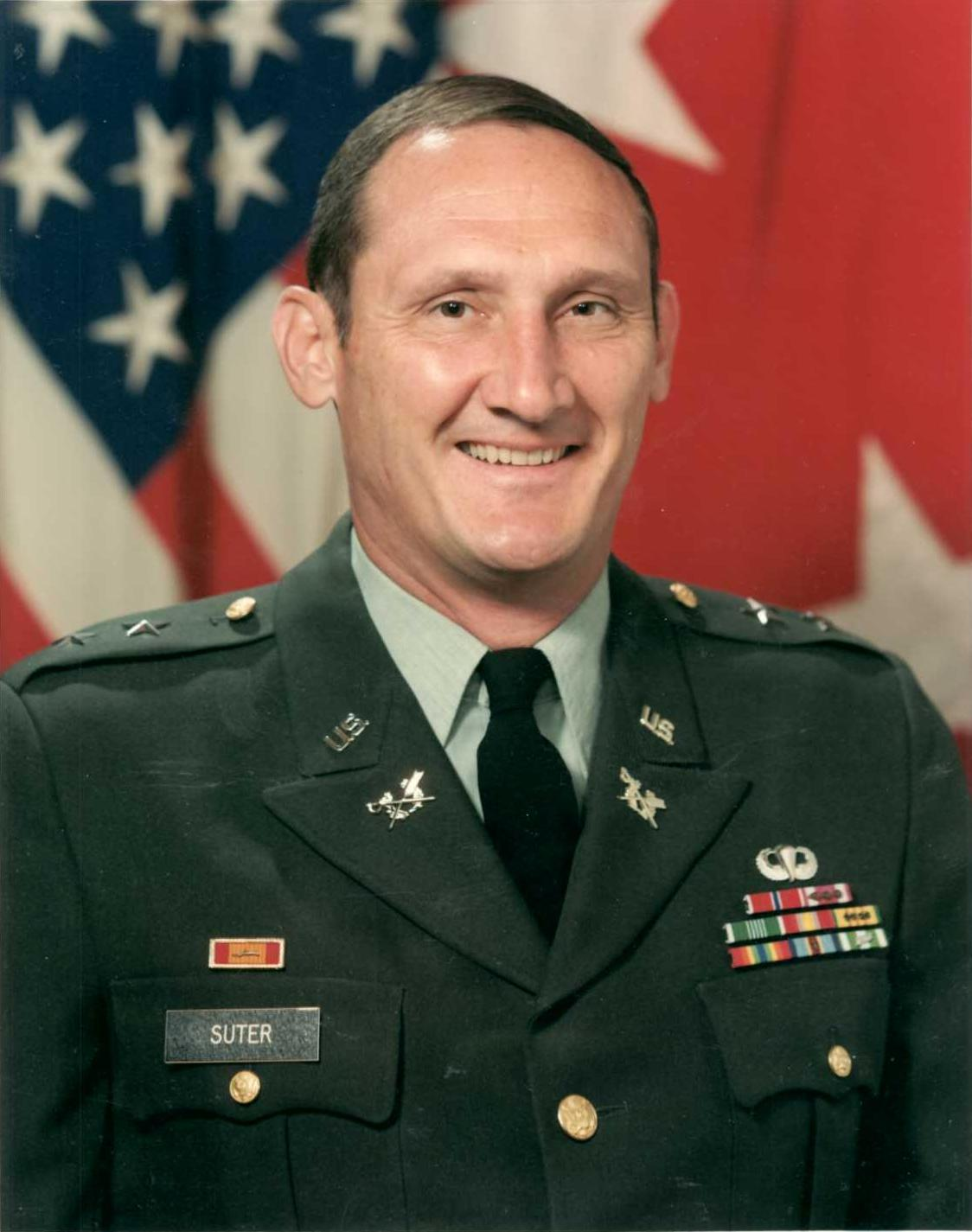
Suter's official portrait as Assistant Judge Advocate General of the Army

=== Early career ===
While at Trinity, Suter was involved in the school's ROTC program. At Fort Hood in 1958, he had the opportunity to meet Elvis Presley, who was going through basic training at the time. After graduating from a basic armor officer's course, Suter attended the Judge Advocate General's School in Charlottesville, Virginia.

As a captain in the mid-1960s, Suter was a popular instructor of administrative law to hundreds of new judge advocates attending their initial training at the JAG School. Before moving on to his next assignment in Thailand, he attended airborne training at Fort Benning, Georgia where he earned his parachutist badge. In 1971, he volunteered for service in Vietnam and was assigned as the Chief, Law Division in Long Binh. After less than four months, Suter was made Deputy Staff Judge Advocate of U.S. forces in Vietnam.

=== A young leader ===
A year later, Suter became the Assistant for Plans in the Judge Advocate General's Corps Plans, Personnel and Training Office and worked at the Pentagon. Following graduation from the Command and General Staff School at Fort Leavenworth, Kansas in 1974, Suter was moved to Fort Campbell, Kentucky and made a Staff Judge Advocate for the 101st Airborne Division, where his division commander was future Army Chief of Staff John A. Wickham. Coincidentally, Suter also served with future Chairman of the Joint Chiefs of Staff and Secretary of State Colin L. Powell while with the 101st.

After graduating from the Industrial College of the Armed Forces in 1980, Suter returned to the Judge Advocate General's School. After spending one year as deputy commandant, the then-colonel was made commandant of the school in 1981. Following his promotion to brigadier general, Suter was assigned as Commander, U.S. Army Legal Services Agency and Chief Judge, US. Army Court of Military Review (now called the U.S. Army Court of Criminal Appeals), holding that position from July 3, 1984, to July 31, 1985.

=== Assistant Judge Advocate General ===
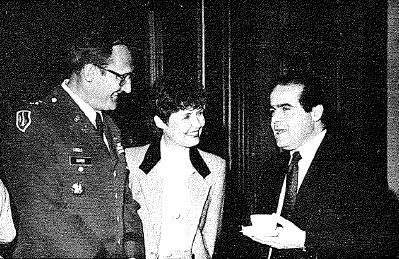
A 1988 photograph of Major General Suter and his wife meeting Supreme Court Associate Justice Antonin Scalia

With the succession of Major General Hugh R. Overholt to Judge Advocate General of the United States Army, the position of Assistant Judge Advocate General would be left vacant, so, in 1985, President Ronald Reagan nominated Suter for promotion to major general and reassignment as TAJAG; on August 1 of that year, he was sworn in.

When Overholt retired in mid-1989, President George H. W. Bush nominated Suter to be made Judge Advocate General of the Army. While his nomination was pending in the Senate, Suter, as the highest-ranking officer in the U.S. Army JAG Corps, was made the acting Judge Advocate General. After a number of months, his and other nominations were returned with criticism of the organization. JAG personnel actions from 1982 were linked to allegations of unlawful command influence in the 3rd Armored Division. Ironically, the Court of Military Review under Chief Judge Suter reversed a number of court-martial convictions arising from these allegations.

In February 1991, after nearly thirty years of service, Suter retired from the Army, receiving a Distinguished Service Medal. His other awards include the Bronze Star, which he was given for his service in Vietnam, and the Meritorious Service Medal.

== Clerk of the Supreme Court ==
When Clerk of the Supreme Court Joseph F. Spaniol, Jr. announced his plans to retire at the end of 1990, Chief Justice of the United States William Rehnquist selected General Suter to take his place. Originally planning to settle down after leaving the Army, Suter jumped at the opportunity, starting immediately after his retirement.

Suter is a prolific speaker about the Court. A popular figure in the national bar, he has received numerous honors for his frequent outreach efforts, including six honorary doctor of laws degrees. He has been a leader among retired judge advocates and a mentor to hundreds of lawyers. After stepping down from the Court, Associate Justice Sandra Day O'Connor recognized Suter for his hard work and described herself as an enthusiastic fan.

To distinguish him from former Supreme Court Associate Justice David Souter, Suter was often referred to within the Supreme Court by the nickname "The General" or as "General Suter". An avid basketball player, he was known throughout his career for his love of the sport. At the Court, he could be seen playing basketball with law clerks on the "highest court in the land".

In January 2013, Suter announced that he would retire on August 31, before the start of the Court's 2013 term. At Suter's retirement celebration on June 12, 2013, Chief Justice John Roberts praised Suter's "inspirational leadership" and "good will and friendship [that] have reached all corners of the building and beyond", noting that "[h]e regularly meets with school children, law students, and foreign dignitaries. He greets them all with equal ease and grace, demonstrating both his good humor and his humanity." Roberts extolled Suter as having "managed the Court's docket with unparalleled organization and efficiency", "contributions to this Court [that] will not fade away."

On July 1, 2013, the Supreme Court named Scott S. Harris as Suter's successor, effective September 1, 2013.

== Personal life ==
After retiring from the Supreme Court, Suter served for two years as a visiting fellow at the Hoover Institution. He also served on the board of visitors of Trinity University and the Campbell University School of Law.

Suter met his wife Jeanie, a now-retired teacher, while attending college in the late 1950s. They have two children and five grandchildren.

== Sources ==
- https://www.loc.gov/rr/frd/Military_Law/pdf/CAR_1966-1967.pdf
- http://law.campbell.edu/page.cfm?id=409&n=general-william-k-suter
- https://books.google.com/books/about/U_S_Army_JAG_School_Oral_History_Intervi.html?id=LKpENwAACAAJ
- https://www.forbes.com/lists/2010/94/best-colleges-10_Trinity-University_950300.html
- http://www.abajournal.com/magazine/article/retired_general_william_suter_salutes_his_20th_year_as_clerk/
- http://www.zagsonline.org/s/829/lawInternal.aspx?sid=829&gid=2&pgid=1915
- http://www.stardem.com/news/article_de4749b4-0403-582b-b8f0-c7c13fe2b9f6.html
- https://books.google.com/books?id=SiUiy6HPopUC&dq=%22Jeanie+Suter%22&pg=PT148
- http://www.scotusblog.com/2012/07/bill-suter-marches-on-and-on/

Military offices
Preceded by Hugh R. Overholt	Judge Advocate General of the United States Army (Acting); 1989–1991	Succeeded by John L. Fugh
Legal offices
Preceded by Joseph F. Spaniol Jr.	Clerk of the Supreme Court of the United States; 1991–2013	Succeeded by Scott S. Harris
