= Thomas Edwards (Judge Advocate General of the United States Army) =

American lawyer

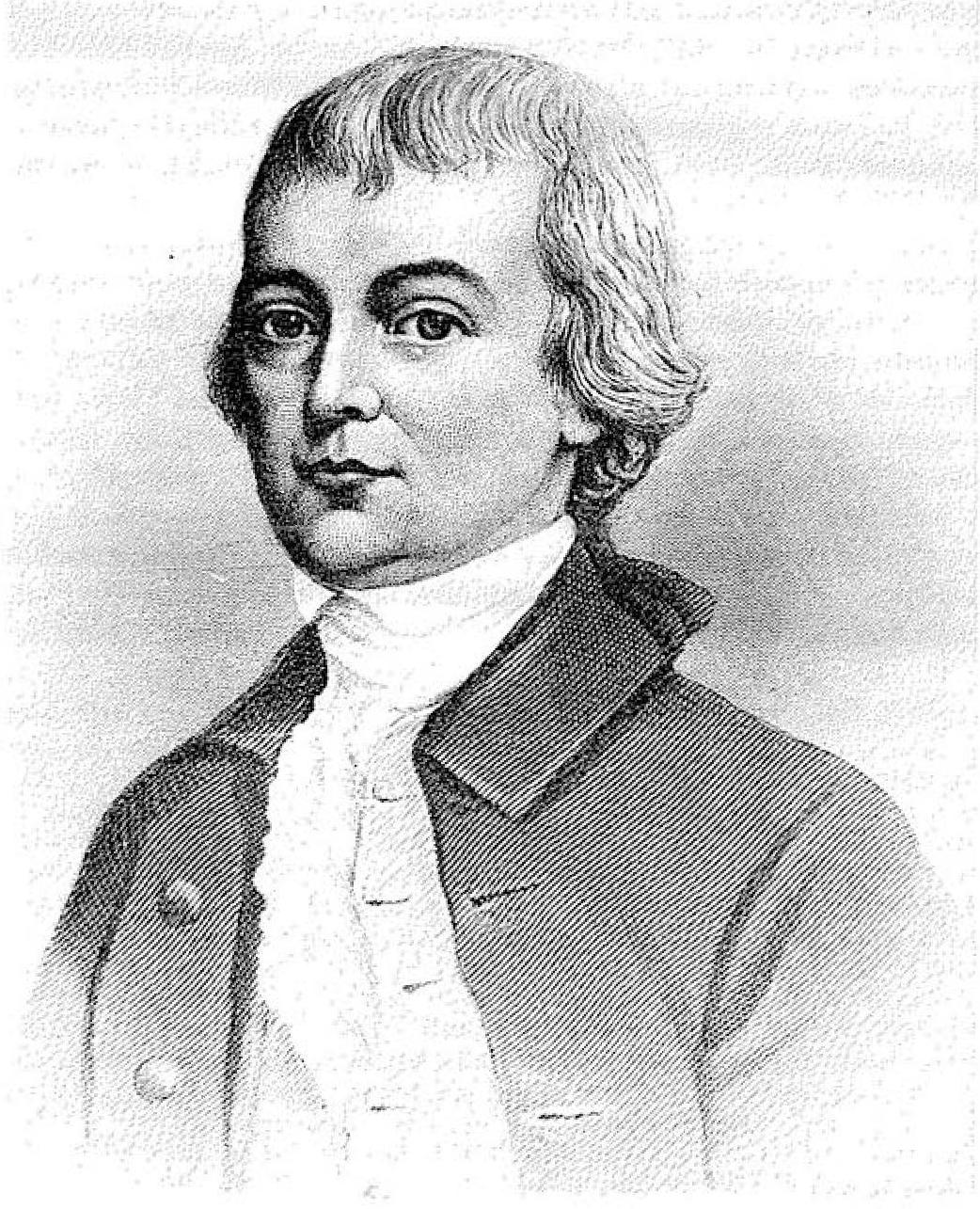
- Born: August 1, 1753
- Died: 1806
- Education: Harvard College

Thomas Edwards (August 1, 1753 – 1806) was the third Judge Advocate General of the United States Army.

Colonel Thomas Edwards was born in Boston, Massachusetts, on 1 August 1753, the son of John and Abigail Edwards. In 1760 he entered Boston Latin School and upon his graduation therefrom entered Harvard College in 1771. Subsequent to his graduation from Harvard College he read law in the office of John Williams of Boston, then a leading practitioner in Massachusetts. He was later admitted to practice in Boston. An ardent patriot, Edwards soon joined the cause of the revolution and on 31 May 1776 was commissioned a lieutenant in the 16th Massachusetts Infantry. The 16th Massachusetts Infantry was considered to be one of the finest regiments of the Continental Army. During hostilities Colonel Edwards took part in the Battles of Monmouth and Springfield, New Jersey, and Quaker Hill, Rhode Island.

When Colonel John Lawrence resigned his position as Judge Advocate General of the Army at the close of the War of Independence, no successor was immediately found for him. On July 9, 1782, Congress elected James Innis of Virginia to the position, but Innis declined it. On July 11, 1782, Congress increased the pay of the Judge Advocate General, fixing it at $75.00 per month, and adding $12.66 per month for subsistence, and an additional $6.66 per month for a servant to whom would also be allowed rations and clothing equivalent to a private in the Army. Besides all this, a two horse wagon and forage for two saddle horses were permitted. On October 2, 1782, Congress elected Lieutenant Thomas Edwards, then of the 9th Massachusetts Infantry, as Judge Advocate General of the Army, with the rank of colonel.

According to a history of the role published by the Office of the Judge Advocate General, Edwards "gained notoriety in 1783 as a victim of the accepted and rather unsubtle command influence of the day". He served in the trial of a Major Reid, who was charged with disobedience and "unmilitary conduct" towards Moses Hazen. When Reid was acquitted, Hazen accused Edwards of "neglect, incompetence, and partiality toward the accused". Edwards was cleared by an officers' court convened by George Washington.

Colonel Edwards retained his position as Judge Advocate General of the Army until November 3, 1783, when he resigned his position and returned to the practice of law in Boston. In June 1784 the remnants of the Continental Army were disbanded and the permanent standing Army limited to 80 enlisted men and their officers. This tiny force was expanded somewhat in succeeding years but no successor to Colonel Edwards wag appointed prior to the adoption of the Constitution of the United States. Following his return to civilian life, Colonel Edwards held various municipal offices in the city of Boston. According to The Memorials of the Massachusetts Society of the Cincinnati (1931), he was "a useful and exemplary citizen and a man of sterling integrity of character... He served as Secretary of the famous Society of the Cincinnati from 1786 until his death in 1806. He had seven children from two marriages.
