= Attorney General Greene =

Attorney General Greene may refer to:

- Albert C. Greene (1792–1863), Attorney General of Rhode Island
- John Greene Jr. (1620–1708), Attorney General of the Colony of Rhode Island
- Ray Greene (politician) (1765–1849), Attorney General of Rhode Island

== See also ==
- General Greene (disambiguation)
- Brad Green (politician) (born 1965), Attorney General of New Brunswick
