= Walter B. Huffman =

United States Army general

Walter Burl Huffman
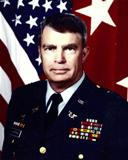
- Major General Walter Burl Huffman; 35th Judge Advocate General of the United States Army
- Born: October 8, 1944 (age 82); Biloxi, Mississippi
- Military career
- Allegiance: United States of America
- Branch: United States Army
- Service years: 1968 - 2001
- Rank: Major General
- Commands: U.S. Army J.A.G. Corps
- Conflicts: Vietnam War; Gulf War
- Awards: Distinguished Service Medal; Def. Superior Service Medal; Legion of Merit; Bronze Star

Major General Walter Burl Huffman, USA (born October 8, 1944) was an American military lawyer who served as the Judge Advocate General of the United States Army from August 5, 1997, until September 30, 2001. He has been a professor at the Texas Tech University School of Law since 2002 and was the dean from 2002 to 2009.

== Awards and decorations ==
Army Distinguished Service Medal
Defense Superior Service Medal
Legion of Merit
Bronze Star
Meritorious Service Medal
Army Commendation Medal
Joint Meritorious Unit Award
Army Superior Unit Award
National Defense Service Medal (with one bronze service star)
Vietnam Service Medal
Southwest Asia Service Medal
Army Service Ribbon
Overseas Service Ribbon
Vietnam Gallantry Cross
Vietnam Campaign Medal
Kuwait Liberation Medal (Saudi Arabia)
Kuwait Liberation Medal (Kuwait)

== Bibliography ==
- Hufman, Walter B.; Rosen, Richard (2016). Military Law: Criminal Justice & Administrative Process (2016 ed.). New York City, New York: Thomson Reuters.
- Huffman, Walter B. (2012). "Margin of Error: Pitfalls of the Ruling in The Prosecutor v. Ante Gotovina". Military Law Review. 211. Washington: Department of the Army: 1–56. ISSN 0026-4040.
- Huffman, Walter B. (2009). "The Fourteenth Hugh J. Clausen Lecture in Leadership". Military Law Review. 199. Washington: Department of the Army: 119–134. ISSN 0026-4040. OCLC 434825675.
- Hufman, Walter B.; Fletcher, Kay P. (2008). 3rd annual West Texas general practice symposium. Austin: State Bar of Texas. OCLC 227277255.

Military offices
Preceded by Michael J. Nardotti, Jr.	Judge Advocate General of the United States Army; 1997 – 2001	Succeeded by Thomas J. Romig
