= John D. Altenburg =

United States general (born 1944)

John D. Altenburg Jr.
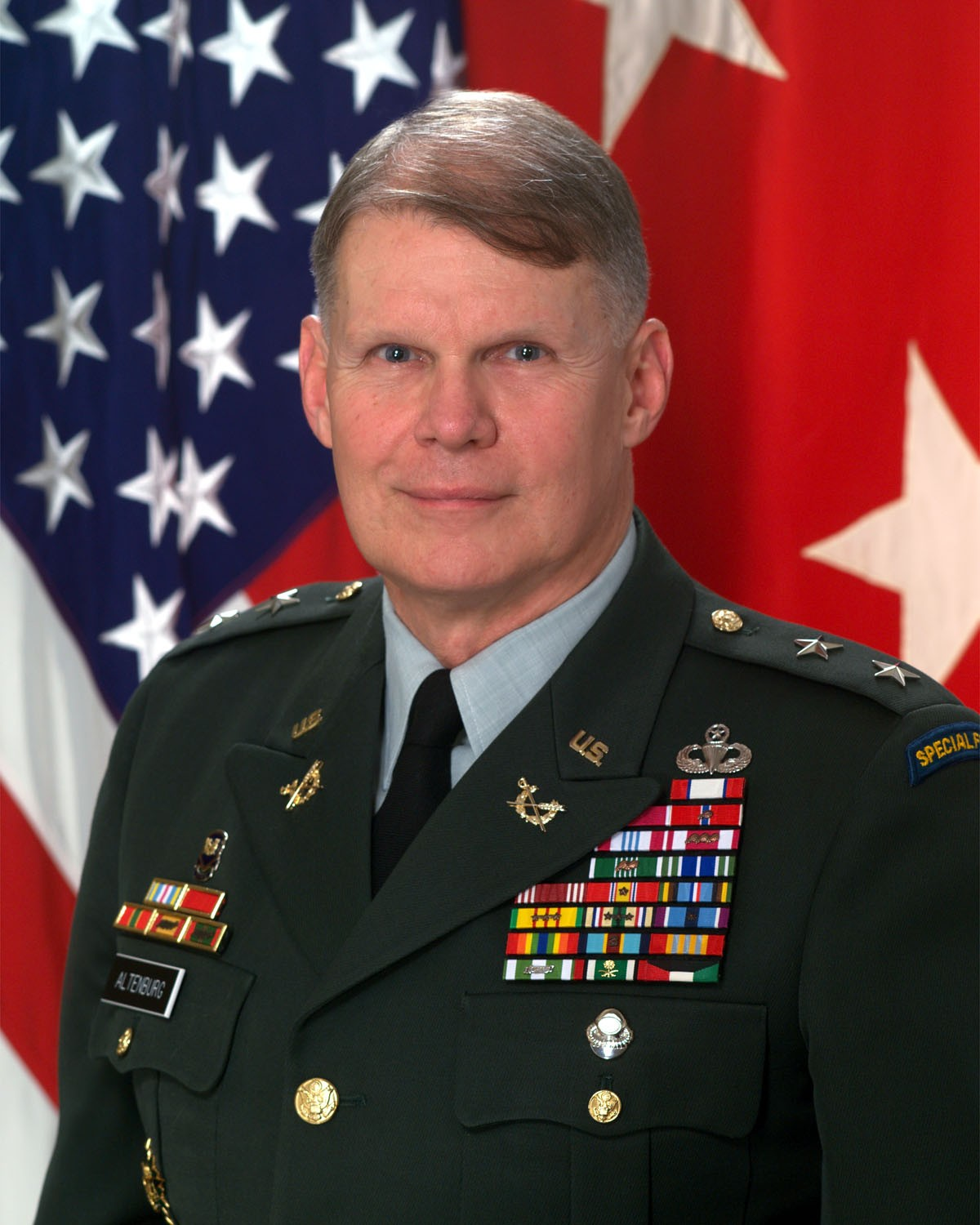
- Born: June 10, 1944 (age 82)
- Military career
- Allegiance: United States of America
- Branch: United States Army
- Service years: 1968–1970; 1973–2001
- Rank: Major General
- Units: 9th Infantry Division (1968–70); JAG Corps
- Commands: Deputy Judge Advocate General of the Army
- Conflicts: Vietnam War
- Other work: Lawyer

John D. Altenburg Jr. (born June 10, 1944) is a lawyer for the U.S. Army and a retired major general. In December 2003, Secretary of Defense Donald Rumsfeld named Altenburg as the appointing authority for military commissions covering detainees at Guantanamo. He resigned on November 10, 2006.

== Early life and education ==
Altenburg grew up in Dayton, Ohio, where he attended Chaminade High School, before his parents moved to Detroit, Michigan in his senior year. While living in the Detroit area, he graduated from Redford St. Mary's High School in 1962. From 1960 to 1965, Altenburg worked as a camp counselor at a Hamilton County, Ohio Catholic summer camp, Fort Scott Camps. He earned his B.A. in English and International studies at Wayne State University in 1966. He taught English at the Elder High School in Cincinnati from 1967 to 1968, the spring of 1970, and the 1970 Summer Enrichment Program.

He entered the US Army in June 1968, serving as an enlisted soldier at Fort Knox, Kentucky; Fort Bragg, North Carolina; and finally South Vietnam with the 9th Infantry Division in the Mekong Delta until honorably discharged in March 1970. He enrolled at the University of Cincinnati College of Law, where received his J.D. in 1973.

He completed the Judge Advocate Officer Basic Course in 1973, and later the Judge Advocate Officer Graduate Course. He was awarded a master's degree in Military Art and Science by the U.S. Army Command and General Staff College in 1986, in conjunction with his completion of the Command and General Staff Officer Course. He completed the year's study in National Security Strategy at the National War College in 1992.

== U.S. Army career ==
Altenburg was commissioned as a United States Army officer after law school. He was assigned to the office of the Center Judge Advocate, John F. Kennedy Special Warfare Center and School, Fort Bragg, North Carolina. After serving as a criminal defense attorney, he was the Judge Advocate, 5th Special Forces Group, and Prosecutor for the JFK Center for almost four years. He subsequently served as the Chief Prosecutor at XVIII Airborne Corps before moving to Germany for service with the 3rd Armored Division, again as Chief Prosecutor for three years.

He authored a training film, "NCO Authority: Destroying the Myths", that became mandatory viewing for all Army noncommissioned officers for several years and continues in use more than 25 years after production. Following tours in the Pentagon Office of the Judge Advocate General and the Office of the Judge Advocate in Heidelberg, Germany, he was the Staff Judge Advocate, 1st Armored Division, including deployment to Desert Storm in 1991. He helped demonstrate the ability of Army units to maintain proper discipline in a combat theatre when his office tried three general courts-martial near the front lines the day before the ground assault into Iraq.

As the Staff Judge Advocate of the XVIII Airborne Corps at Fort Bragg, he deployed to south Florida in 1992 for humanitarian relief operations after Hurricane Andrew. He deployed to Haiti with Joint Task Force 180 in 1994 for peacekeeping operations. During his three years at Fort Bragg, he was instrumental in resolving land use issues and protecting the Army's interests by working closely with the Fayetteville City Council and the Cumberland County Board of Commissioners. He played a key negotiating and coordinating role in effecting the eventual purchase of 10,000 acres (40 km^{2}) of additional training land contiguous to Fort Bragg.

He served for 28 years as a lawyer in the Army. From 1997 to 2001, he was the Deputy Judge Advocate General of the Army. Altenburg retired at the rank of Major General. His service was marked by extensive experience in military justice, international law and operations law. He was one of several key JAG Corps leaders who helped transform the practice of law in the Army by insisting that lawyers acquire soldier skills and immerse themselves in their clients' business to become more effective advocates.

- Deputy Judge Advocate General, Department of the Army, 1997–2001
- Assistant Judge Advocate General for Military Law and Operations, Department of the Army, 1995–1997
- Judge Advocate, U.S. Army, 1973–1995

=== Awards and decorations ===
- Army Distinguished Service Medal
- Legion of Merit (2)
- Bronze Star (2)
- Defense Meritorious Service Medal
- Meritorious Service Medal (4)
- Joint Service Commendation Medal
- Army Commendation Medal (3)
- Army Achievement Medal
- Master Parachutist Badge
- Combat Diver's Badge
- Special Forces Tab

== Civilian law practice ==
Following his 2002 retirement from the Army, Altenburg was a consultant on corporate governance and ethics issues to the President, World Bank Group in Washington, D.C. before moving to Greenberg Traurig, a large, international law firm, where he focused his practice on contract litigation, corporate investigations and governance, and international law.

His community activities included:

- Vice Chair, Board of Directors, National Coalition for Homeless Veterans
- U.S. Representative, Experts Panel, International Institute of Humanitarian Law
- Trustee, Board of Trustees, Joseph House for Homeless Veterans
- President, Board of Governors, Judge Advocates Association
- President, Board of Governors, The Army and Navy Club
- Member, Joint Regional Land Use Committee
- President, Board of Governors, VII Corps Desert Storm Veterans Association
- Member, House of Delegates, American Bar Association, 2010
- Chairman, Standing Committee on Armed Forces Law, American Bar Association, 2011
- Director, Board of Directors, The Washington Ballet, 2008–2011

== Named appointing authority for Military Commissions ==
In December 2003, Secretary of Defense Donald Rumsfeld appointed General Altenburg to serve as the appointing authority for military commissions.

Military Commission Order No. 1, dated March 21, 2002, describes the duties of the appointing authority. The appointing authority

is responsible for overseeing many aspects of the military commission process, including approving charges against individuals the president has determined are subject to the military order of November 13, 2001. Among other things, the appointing authority is also responsible for appointing military commission members, approving plea agreements and supervising the Office of the Appointing Authority. Altenburg will serve in this capacity as a civilian.

After the Military Commissions were declared by the Supreme Court to require additional Congressional authority, the Congress effected new legislation in order to allow a modified form of the commissions to proceed. The Military Commissions Act passed in September 2006. "Altenburg said he agreed to stay on the job until a draft manual implementing the new Military Commissions Act was complete. He said the draft went to superiors at the Pentagon and Justice Department on October 27, and he submitted his resignation immediately afterwards. His last day was November 10."

== Named Bradley Chair for Strategic Leadership ==
Altenburg served as the 2010-2011 General of the Armies Omar N. Bradley Chair of Strategic Leadership in Carlisle, Pennsylvania. The Bradley Chair was established in 2002 as a joint academic chair offering a visiting scholar the opportunity to encourage civilian-military dialogue and share lessons on leadership, globalization, technology, and cultural change with students and faculty at Dickinson College, the Army War College, and Penn State University's Dickinson School of Law. The Chair is sponsored by the three colleges and supported by the Army War College Foundation.

== Bibliography ==
- Author, "Just Three Mistakes!," Case Western Reserve Journal of International Law, Winter 2009
- Co-Author, The Revolving Door Dilemma, NATIONAL DEFENSE MAGAZINE, October 2008 (with Sean M. Connolly)
- Author, "Rhetoric or Reality? Winning the Battle of Ideas," Barry Law Review, Volume 7, pp 149–167, Fall 2006.
- Co-Author, "Terrorism, State Responsibility, and the Use of Military Force," Chicago Journal of International Law, Volume 4, Number 1, pp 97–119, Spring 2003.
