= Alexander L. Stevas =

Clerk of the Supreme Court of the United States

17th Clerk of the Supreme Court of the United States
- In office January 17, 1981 – July 31, 1985
- Preceded by: Michael Rodak, Jr.
- Succeeded by: Joseph F. Spaniol, Jr.

Personal details
- Born: Alexander Louis Stevas; January 30, 1923 New Castle, Pennsylvania
- Died: June 3, 2020 (aged 97)
- Spouse: Gladys Rauh

Alexander Louis Stevas (January 30, 1923 – June 3, 2020) was the 17th Clerk of the Supreme Court of the United States, a position he held from 1981 to 1985.

Legal offices
Preceded by Michael Rodak, Jr.	Clerk of the Supreme Court of the United States; 1981-1985	Succeeded by Joseph F. Spaniol, Jr.
