= Deputy Judge Advocate General of the United States Army =

Second highest-ranking JAG officer and lawyer in the U.S. Army

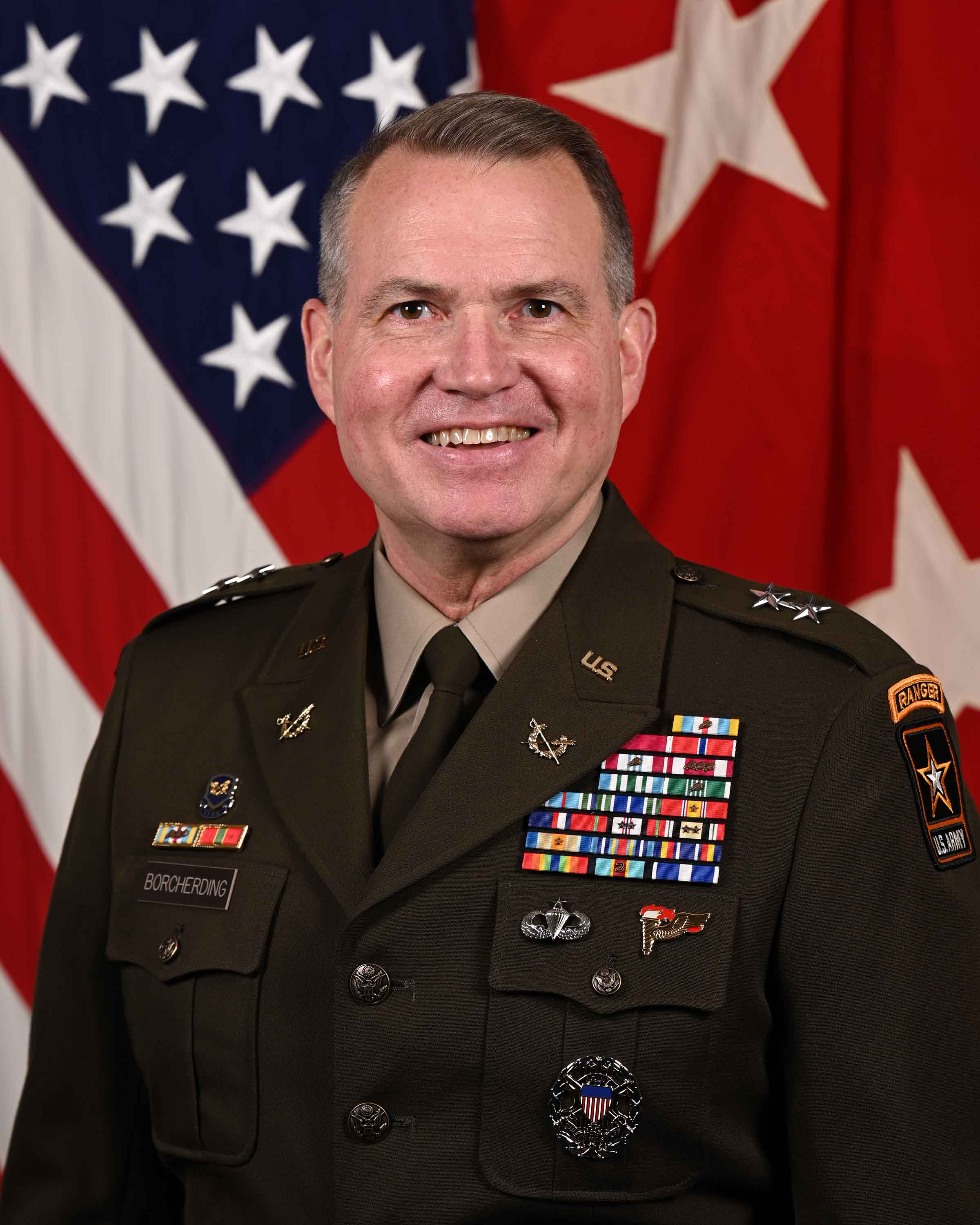
- Incumbent; MG Robert A. Borcherding since July 15, 2024
- Formation: 1949
- First holder: MG Hubert D. Hoover
- Website: Official Website

The Deputy Judge Advocate General of the Army (DJAG) is the second highest ranking JAG officer and lawyer in the United States Army. Similar to the Judge Advocate General of the United States Army (TJAG), the DJAG is appointed by the president with the advice and consent of the senate. Upon appointment to the office of DJAG, the appointee, if they hold a lower rank, will be promoted to the rank of major general.

== U.S. Army Deputy Judge Advocates General ==
	Name	Photo	Term began	Term ended
1.	MG Hubert D. Hoover		1949	1950
2.	MG Franklin P. Shaw		1950	December 1953
3.	MG Claude B. Mickelwait		January 1954	August 1956
4.	MG George W. Hickman Jr.		August 1956	December 1956
5.	MG Stanley W. Jones		January 1957	December 1960
6.	MG Robert H. McCaw		January 1961	1964
7.	MG Harry J. Engel		1964	1967
8.	MG Lawrence J. Fuller		1967	1971
9.	MG Harold E. Parker		1971	1975
10.	MG Lawrence H. Williams		1975	1979
11.	MG Hugh J. Clausen		1979	1981
12.	MG Hugh R. Overholt		1981	1985
13.	MG William K. Suter		August 1, 1985	February 1, 1991
14.	MG Robert E. Murray		1991	1993
15.	MG Kenneth D. Gray		1993	1997
16.	MG John D. Altenburg, Jr.		1997	2001
17.	MG Michael J. Marchand		October 1, 2001	October 1, 2005
18.	MG Daniel V. Wright		October 1, 2005	October 1, 2009
19.	MG Clyde J. Tate II		October 1, 2009	October 1, 2013
20.	MG Thomas E. Ayres		October 1, 2013	July 14, 2017
21.	MG Stuart W. Risch		July 14, 2017	July 12, 2021
22.	MG Joseph B. Berger III		July 12, 2021	July 15, 2024
23.	MG Robert A. Borcherding		July 15, 2024	Incumbent

== See also ==
- Judge Advocate General of the United States Army
