= Kenneth J. Hodson =

United States Army general

Kenneth Joe Hodson
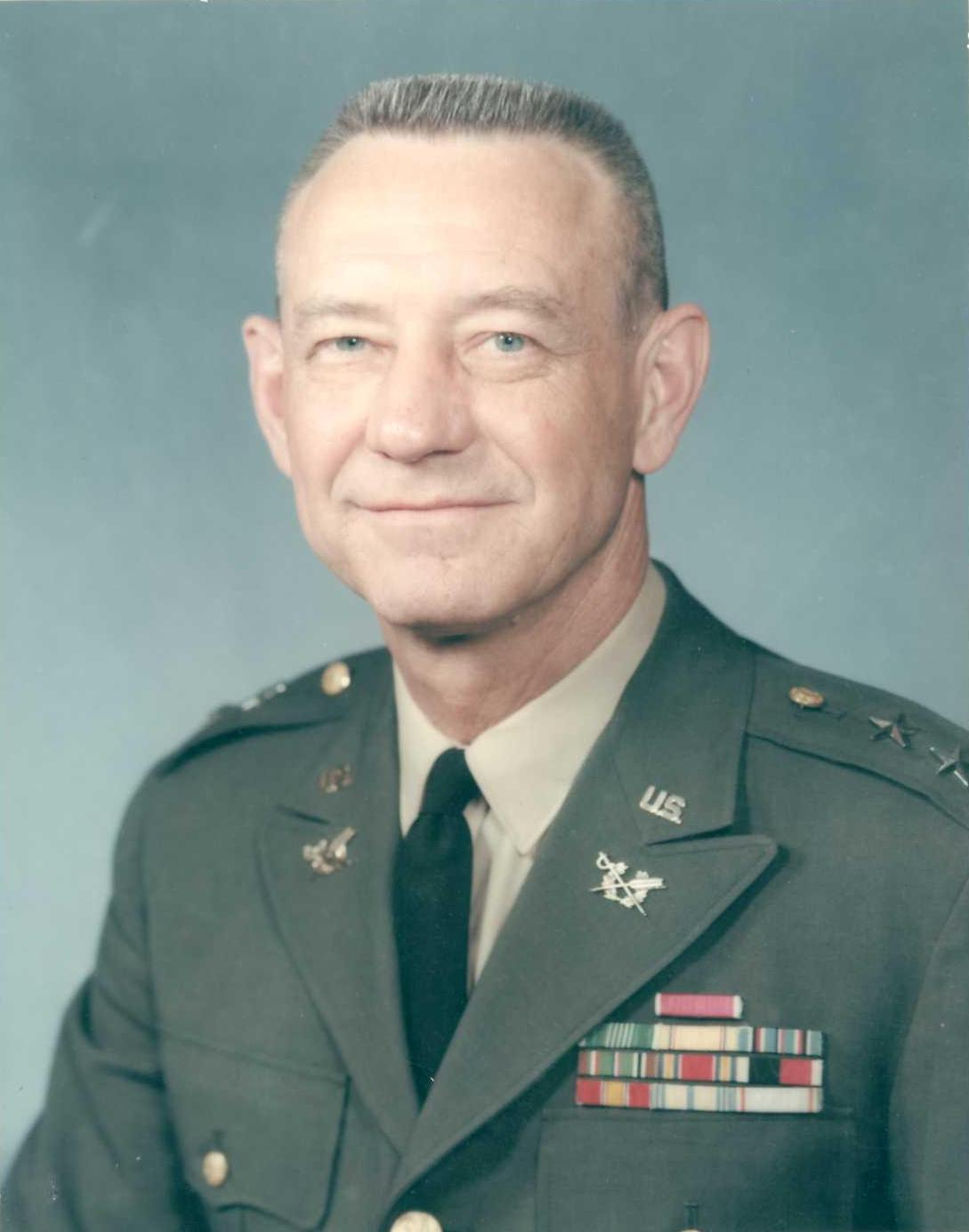
- Major General Kenneth Joe Hodson; 27th Judge Advocate General of the United States Army
- Born: April 27, 1913; Kansas, U.S.
- Died: November 11, 1995 (aged 82); Washington, D.C., U.S.
- Burial place: Arlington National Cemetery; Arlington, Virginia, U.S.
- Military career
- Allegiance: United States of America
- Branch: United States Army
- Service years: 1941–1971; 1972–1974
- Rank: Major General
- Commands: U.S. Army J.A.G. Corps
- Conflicts: World War II; Korean War; Vietnam War
- Awards: Distinguished Service Medal; Legion of Merit; Army Commendation Medal

Major General Kenneth Joe Hodson, USA (April 27, 1913 – November 11, 1995) was an American military lawyer who served as the 27th Judge Advocate General of the United States Army from 1967 to 1971.

== Career ==
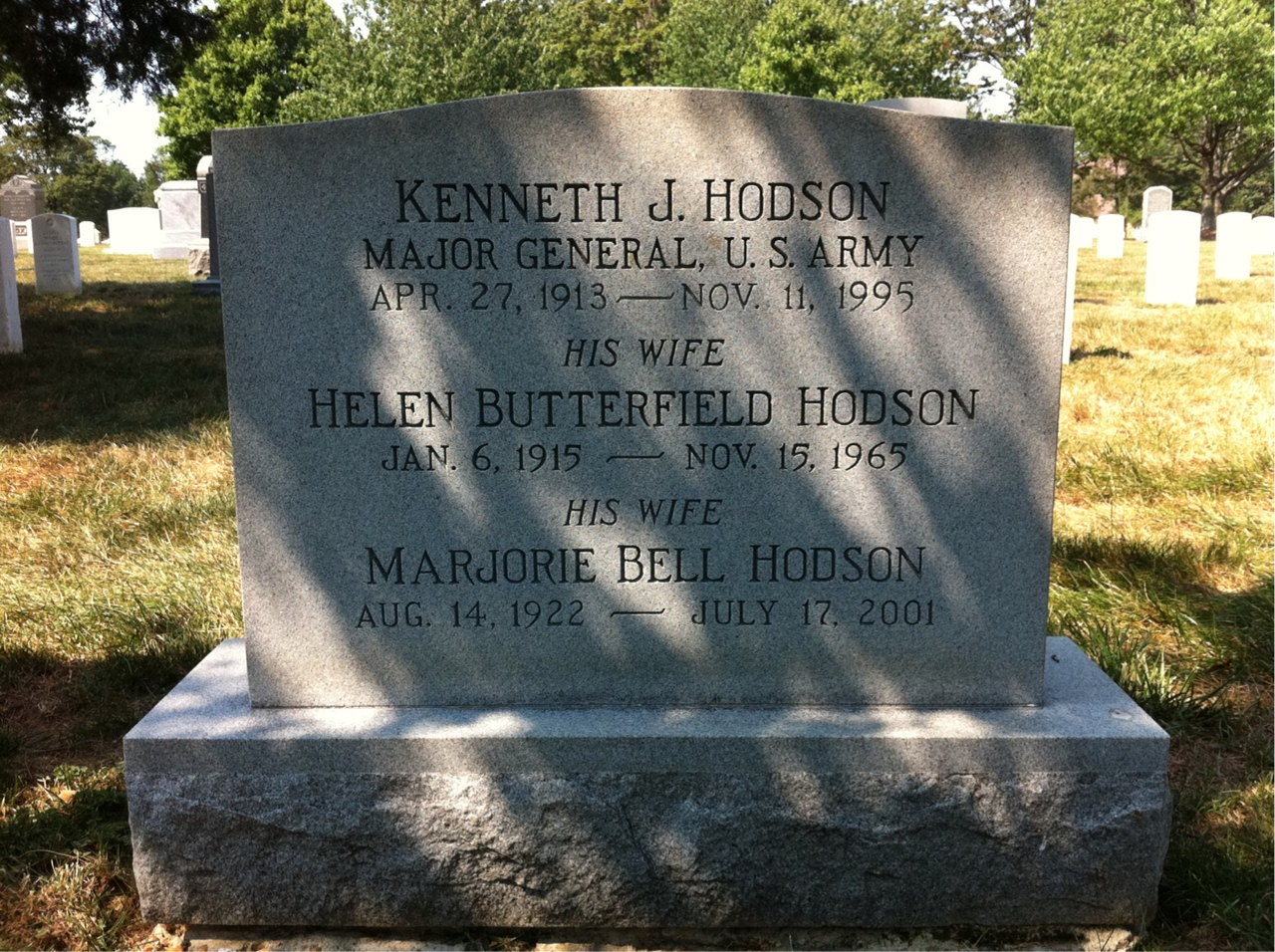
Grave at Arlington National Cemetery

After retiring from the Army in 1971, Gen. Hodson was recalled to active duty to serve as the first chief judge of the newly created Army Court of Military Review and as chief judge of the Army judiciary. He retired from those positions in 1974.

From 1974 until 1976, he was executive director of the National Commission for the Review of Federal and State Laws Relating to Wiretapping and Electronic Surveillance. Later, he was a consultant on studies funded by the Law Enforcement Assistance Administration.

The American Bar Association's Government and Public Sector Lawyers Division created the Hodson Award, in honor of the distinguished public service career of the late Major General. The Award recognizes sustained, outstanding performance or a specific and extraordinary service by a government or public sector law office (it is not an award for an individual).

Hodson died from cancer at the age of 82 on November 11, 1995, in a Washington Home Hospice.

== See also ==
- Judge Advocate General's Corps, U.S. Army

Military offices
Preceded by George S. Prugh	Judge Advocate General of the United States Army; 1967–1971	Succeeded by Robert H. McCaw
