= Edward Albert Kreger =

American Major General

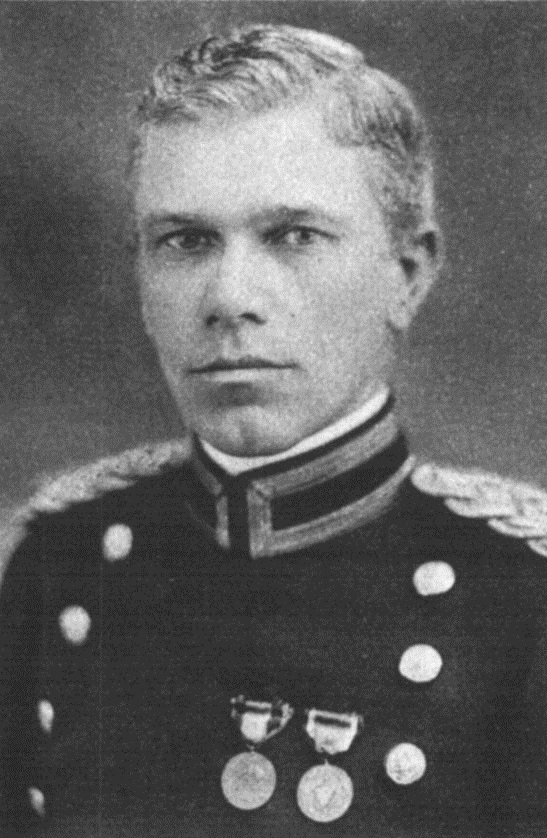
- From the May 1918 edition of Current History magazine
- Born: May 31, 1868 near Keota, Iowa
- Died: May 24, 1955 (aged 86); San Antonio, Texas
- Burial place: Fort Sam Houston National Cemetery
- Education: Iowa State College (BS, 1890)
- Spouse: Laura Mae Roddis (m. 1891–1955, his death)
- Children: 1
- Military career
- Allegiance: United States
- Branch: Iowa National Guard; United States Army
- Service years: 1893–1898 (National Guard); 1898–1931 (Army)
- Rank: Major General
- Service number: 0–377
- Unit: Judge Advocate General's Corps, United States Army
- Commands: Company M, 4th Iowa Infantry Regiment; Company M, 52nd Iowa Volunteer Infantry; Company M, 52nd Iowa Infantry Regiment; Company G, 39th U.S. Volunteer Infantry; Judge Advocate General of the United States Army
- Conflicts: Spanish–American War; Philippine–American War; World War I
- Awards: Distinguished Service Cross; Army Distinguished Service Medal

Edward Albert Kreger (May 31, 1868 – May 24, 1955) was an American lawyer and career officer in the United States Army. A veteran of the Spanish–American War, Philippine–American War, and World War I, he was most notable for his service as Acting Judge Advocate General of the American Expeditionary Forces during the First World War and Judge Advocate General of the United States Army from 1928 to 1931.

A native of Keota, Iowa, Kreger graduated from Iowa State College in 1890 and worked as a school teacher, principal, and superintendent while studying law at several Iowa colleges. He joined the Iowa National Guard in 1893 and was admitted to the bar in 1897. After commanding Company M, 4th Iowa Infantry in the 1890s, he volunteered for federal service during the Spanish–American War as a member of 52nd Iowa Volunteer Infantry. In 1901, he received an Army commission in the 39th U.S. Volunteer Infantry. Kreger served as a professor of law, judge advocate, and legal advisor for several Army commands in the years before World War I.

During World War I, Kreger served as the Army's Assistant Provost Marshal General and as acting Judge Advocate General of the American Expeditionary Forces. After the war, he continued to serve in judge advocate assignments until 1928, when he was promoted to major general and assigned as Judge Advocate General of the United States Army.

Kreger died in San Antonio, Texas, on May 24, 1955, and was buried at Fort Sam Houston National Cemetery. Kreger was awarded the Distinguished Service Cross for his service in the Philippines and the Army Distinguished Service Medal for his World War I service.

== Early life and education ==
Edward Albert Kreger was born on May 31, 1868, near Keota, Iowa, the son of William Kreger and Johanna Henrike (Pimme) Kreger. He attended the public schools of Keokuk County and graduated from Keota High School.

Kreger graduated from Iowa State College in 1890 with a Bachelor of Science degree in electrical engineering. While at college, Kreger served in the school's Cadet Corps, where he advanced through the ranks from private to major.

== Civilian career ==
From 1891 to 1893, he was a high school principal. From 1894 to 1896, he served as school superintendent of Cherokee, Iowa. While teaching school, Kreger studied law at the State University of Iowa, the Iowa College of Law, and Drake University.

Kreger was admitted to the bar in January 1897. He then left the teaching profession and began a law practice in Cherokee.

== Military career ==
From 1893 to 1898, he served in the Iowa National Guard. In 1893, he organized Company M, 4th Iowa Infantry, which he was elected to command with the rank of captain. In November 1894, he was appointed Signal and Engineer officer on the staff of the 2nd Brigade and promoted to major. In November 1895, he accepted reduction in rank to captain so he could resume command of Company M.

His unit was called to federal service for the Spanish–American War and from April 1898 to October 1898, Kreger served as commander of Company M, 52nd Iowa Volunteer Infantry during its training at Camp Thomas, Georgia. During the company's wartime service, one member who served under Kreger was Guy Gillette, who later served in the United States Senate.

After returning to Iowa, Kreger's company was re-designated as Company M, 52nd Iowa Infantry Regiment. In 1899, he accepted a commission in the 39th U.S. Volunteer Infantry, and commanded Company G from 1899 to 1901. He served in Luzon and Leyte, and received the Distinguished Service Cross for "extraordinary heroism while serving with 39th Infantry, U.S. Volunteers, in action between Los Banos and Bay Laguna, Philippine Islands, 10 March 1900, in an engagement with an armed enemy".

In 1905, he graduated from the Infantry and Cavalry School at Fort Leavenworth. In 1906, he graduated from the United States Army Command and General Staff College. From 1906 to 1908, he taught law at the staff college.

From 1907 to 1909, he was stationed in Cuba. From 1909 to 1911, he served as the judge advocate of the Department of the Colorado.

In 1912, Kreger was admitted to practice before the United States Supreme Court. From 1914 to 1917, he was a professor of law at the United States Military Academy.

From May 1917 to February 1918 he was the Army's Assistant Provost Marshal General. Kreger served as the acting Judge Advocate General of the American Expeditionary Forces during World War I.

From March 1919 to October 1921 he was acting Judge Advocate General of the United States Army. In 1920, Kreger supervised preparation of the Army's Manual for Courts-Martial. In 1921, he oversaw preparation of Military Laws of the United States.

From 1921 to 1924, Kreger was the assistant Judge Advocate General of the United States Army. From 1924 to 1925, Kreger was judge advocate of the Third Corps Area. In 1925, he was appointed legal advisor to the American delegation that served on the Tacna-Arica Arbitration Commission in South America.

In 1927, he was appointed judge advocate of the Second Corps Area. From 1928 to 1931, he was Judge Advocate General of the United States Army.

== Awards ==
In November 1919, Kreger received the Distinguished Service Cross for heroism in the Philippines in March 1900. The citation reads:

For extraordinary heroism in an engagement with an armed enemy between Los Baños and Bay Laguna, Philippine islands, on March 19, 1900, while serving as a captain, Thirty-ninth Infantry, United States volunteers.

In addition, he received the Army Distinguished Service Medal for actions during World War I, the citation for which reads:

The President of the United States of America, authorized by Act of Congress, July 9, 1918, takes pleasure in presenting the Army Distinguished Service Medal to Brigadier General Edward A. Kreger, United States Army, for exceptionally meritorious and distinguished services to the Government of the United States, in a duty of great responsibility during World War I. As Acting Judge Advocate General for the American Expeditionary Forces, General Kreger has organized and efficiently administered his office, performing exacting duties with marked distinction. His masterful knowledge of military law, his foresight, and practical comprehension of the complex problems involved in his work enabled him to perform it with noteworthy success. His counsel was wise; his decisions were just. His services to the American Expeditionary Forces have been of great value.

== Family ==
Kreger married Laura Mae Roddis in 1891. They were the parents of a daughter, Vera (1893–1987). Vera Kreger was the wife of Colonel J. Huntington Hills (1892–1981).

== Death and legacy ==
Kreger died in San Antonio, Texas, on May 24, 1955. He was buried at Fort Sam Houston National Cemetery.

His papers are held by the Dolph Briscoe Center for American History at the University of Texas at Austin.
