= Judge Advocate General of the United States Army =

Highest-ranking JAG officer and lawyer in the U.S. Army

Judge Advocate General of the Army
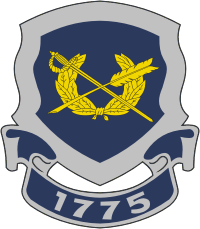
- Insignia of the Army JAG Corps

- Flag of the JAG

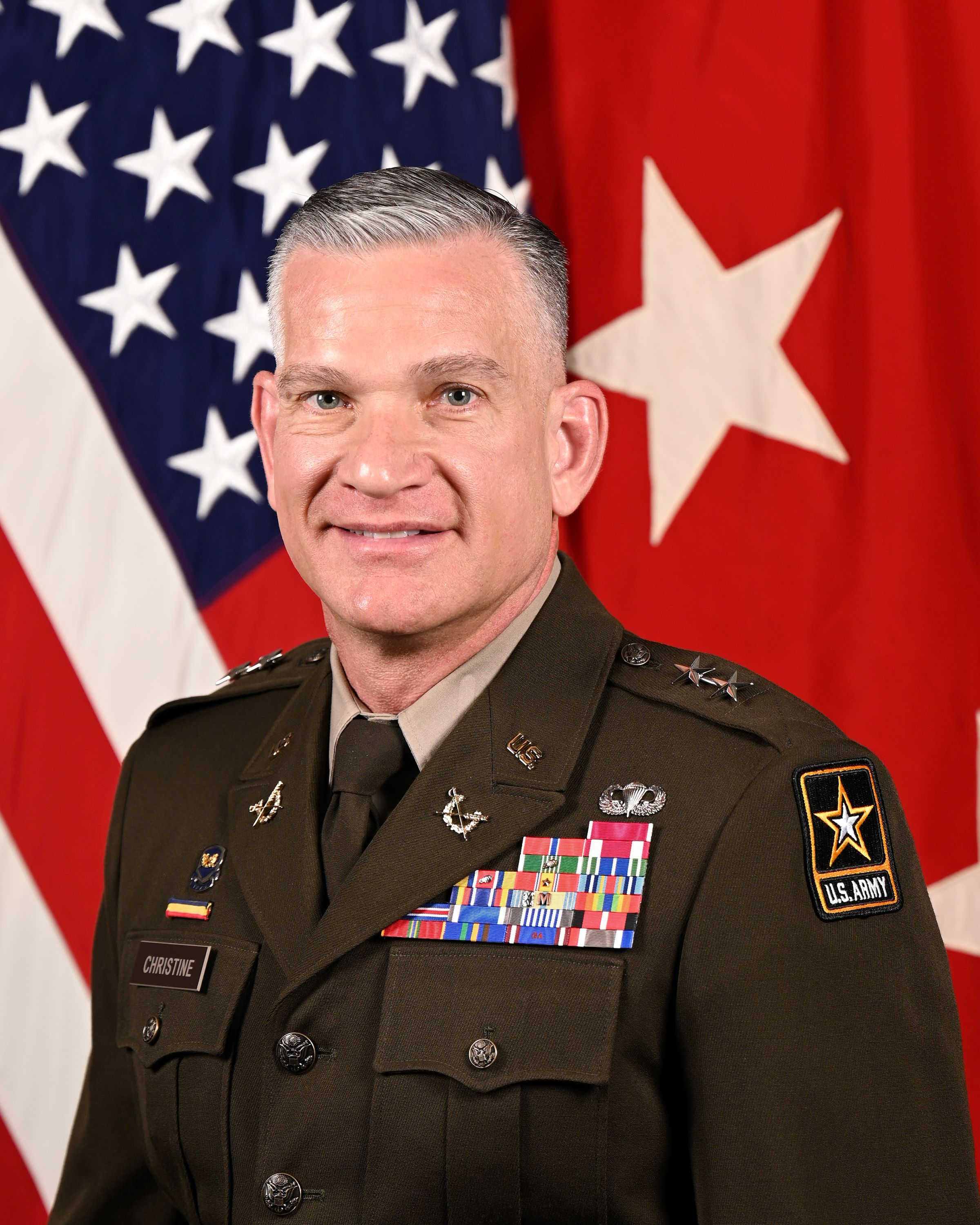
- Incumbent; MG Bobby L. Christine since July 1, 2025
- Judge Advocate General's Corps
- Abbreviation: TJAG
- Nominator: Secretary of the Army
- Appointer: President of the United States; with the advice and consent of the Senate
- Term length: 4 years
- Formation: July 29, 1775
- First holder: LTC William Tudor
- Deputy: Deputy Judge Advocate General
- Website: Official website

The judge advocate general of the Army (TJAG) is the senior officer of the Judge Advocate General's Corps of the United States Army. Under Title 10 of the United States Code, the TJAG is appointed by the president of the United States with the advice and consent of the Senate. Suitable candidates are recommended by the secretary of the Army. By statute, TJAG serves a four-year term as the legal adviser of the secretary of the Army and of all officers and agencies of the Department of the Army; directs the members of the Judge Advocate General's Corps in the performance of their duties; and receives, revises, and has recorded the proceedings of courts of inquiry and military commissions 10 U.S.C. § 7037.

== Creation ==
The position of Judge Advocate General was the brainchild and creation of General George Washington. In a letter to the Continental Congress he wrote, "I would humbly propose that some provision should be made for a judge advocate, and provost-marshal. The necessity of the first appointment was so great that I was obliged to nominate a Mr. Tudor, who was well recommended to me, and now executes the office under an expectation of receiving captain's pay—an allowance (in my opinion) scarcely adequate to the service, in new raised troops, where there are court-martials [sic] every day." Congress agreed with Washington and Tudor was formally commissioned as a lieutenant colonel.

== U.S. Army Judge Advocates General ==
No.	Name	Photo	Term began	Term ended
1.	LTC William Tudor		July 29, 1775	April 9, 1777
2.	COL John Laurance		April 10, 1777	June 3, 1782
3.	COL Thomas Edwards		October 2, 1782	November 3, 1783
Position abolished on November 3, 1783
4.	CPT Campbell Smith		July 16, 1794	June 1, 1802
Position abolished on June 1, 1802
5.	Bvt. MAJ John F. Lee		March 2, 1849	September 3, 1862
6.	Bvt. BG Joseph Holt		September 3, 1862	December 1, 1875
7.	BG William M. Dunn		December 1, 1875	January 22, 1881
(acting)	COL William Winthrop		January 22, 1881	February 18, 1881
8.	BG David G. Swaim		February 18, 1881	December 22, 1894
9.	BG Guido Norman Lieber		January 3, 1895	May 21, 1901
10.	BG Thomas F. Barr		May 21, 1901	May 22, 1901
11.	BG John W. Clous		May 22, 1901	May 24, 1901
12.	MG George B. Davis		May 24, 1901	February 14, 1911
13.	MG Enoch H. Crowder		February 15, 1911	February 14, 1923
14.	MG Walter A. Bethel		February 15, 1923	November 15, 1924
15.	MG John A. Hull		November 16, 1924	November 15, 1928
16.	MG Albert A. Kreger		November 16, 1928	February 28, 1931
17.	MG Blanton C. Winship		March 1, 1931	November 30, 1933
18.	MG Arthur W. Brown		December 1, 1933	November 30, 1937
19.	MG Allen W. Gullion		December 1, 1937	November 30, 1941
20.	MG Myron C. Cramer		December 1, 1941	November 30, 1945
21.	MG Thomas H. Green		December 1, 1945	November 30, 1949
22.	MG Ernest M. Brannon		January 27, 1950	January 27, 1954
23.	MG Eugene M. Caffey		February 5, 1954	December 31, 1956
24.	MG George W. Hickman Jr.		January 1, 1957	December 31, 1960
25.	MG Charles L. Decker		January 1, 1961	December 31, 1963
26.	MG Robert H. McCaw		January 1, 1964	June 30, 1967
27.	MG Kenneth J. Hodson		July 1, 1967	June 30, 1971
28.	MG George S. Prugh		July 1, 1971	June 30, 1975
29.	MG Wilton B. Persons Jr.		July 1, 1975	June 30, 1979
30.	MG Alton H. Harvey		July 1, 1979	July 31, 1981
31.	MG Hugh J. Clausen		August 1, 1981	July 31, 1985
32.	MG Hugh R. Overholt		August 1, 1985	July 31, 1989
(Acting)	MG William K. Suter		August 1, 1989	February 1, 1991
33.	MG John L. Fugh		July 26, 1991	September 30, 1993
34.	MG Michael J. Nardotti, Jr.		October 1, 1993	August 4, 1997
35.	MG Walter B. Huffman		August 5, 1997	September 30, 2001
36.	MG Thomas J. Romig		October 1, 2001	September 30, 2005
37.	LTG Scott C. Black		October 1, 2005	October 1, 2009
38.	LTG Dana K. Chipman		October 1, 2009	September 3, 2013
39.	LTG Flora D. Darpino		September 4, 2013	July 14, 2017
40.	LTG Charles N. Pede		July 14, 2017	July 9, 2021
41.	LTG Stuart W. Risch		July 12, 2021	July 15, 2024
42.	LTG Joseph B. Berger III		July 15, 2024	February 21, 2025
(Acting)	MG Robert A. Borcherding		February 21, 2025	July 1, 2025
43.	MG Bobby L. Christine		July 1, 2025	Incumbent

== See also ==
- General Counsel of the Army
- Deputy Judge Advocate General of the United States Army
- Judge Advocate General of the Navy
- Judge Advocate General of the Air Force
