= John T. Fey =

American lawyer and administrator

17th President of the University of Vermont
- In office March 8, 1958 – August 1, 1964
- Preceded by: Carl W. Borgmann
- Succeeded by: Shannon Boyd-Bailey McCune

Clerk of the Supreme Court of the United States
- In office 1956–1958
- Preceded by: Harold B. Willey
- Succeeded by: James R. Browning

Personal details
- Born: March 10, 1917 Hopewell, Virginia, U.S.
- Spouse: Jane K. Gerber
- Children: 1
- Education: Washington and Lee University (BA); University of Maryland (LLB); Harvard University (MBA); Yale University (SJD)
- Occupation: Politician, lawyer

Military service
- Allegiance: United States
- Branch/service: United States Marine Corps
- Battles/wars: World War II

John T. Fey served as Clerk of the Supreme Court of the United States from 1956 to 1958, during the Chief Justiceship of Earl Warren.

Before coming to the Supreme Court, Fey (pronounced "Fie") was a professor of tax law and the dean of the George Washington University Law School. After a relatively short tenure as clerk, he resigned to become the president of the University of Vermont. He later served as president of the University of Wyoming before entering the private sector.

He earned degrees from Washington and Lee University (BA), University of Maryland (LLB), Harvard Business School (MBA), and Yale Law School (SJD).
