= Lawrence J. Fuller =

American army general and public servant

Lawrence Joseph Fuller
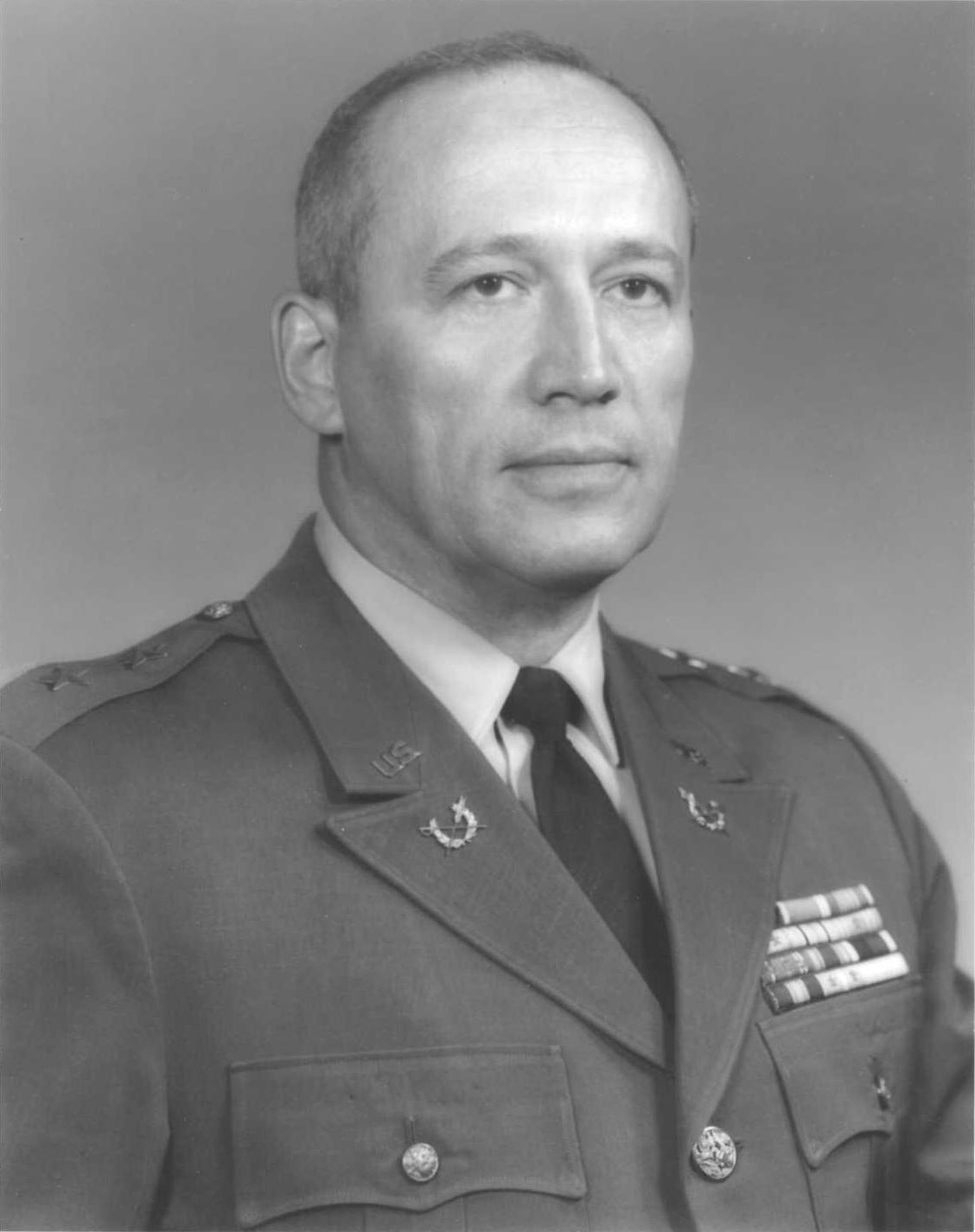
- Born: 20 December 1914; Everett, Washington
- Died: 19 August 1998 (aged 83)
- Burial place: Arlington National Cemetery
- Alma mater: University of Michigan
- Spouse: Mary Fuller
- Military career
- Allegiance: United States
- Branch: United States Army
- Rank: Major General
- Conflicts: World War II
- Awards: Dist. Svc Medal; Legion of Merit

Lawrence Joseph Fuller (20 December 1914 – 19 August 1998) was an American army major general who served as the deputy director of the Defense Intelligence Agency.

== Early life ==
Fuller was born in Everett, Washington, and raised in Grand Rapids, Michigan, where he attended Grand Rapids Junior College. He graduated from the U.S. Military Academy in 1940. He also graduated from the University of Michigan, from George Washington University, and from Stanford University.

== Military career ==
During World War II, Fuller served in the Pacific and with the 3rd Army in Europe. He was the Deputy Judge Advocate General of the United States Army from 1967 to 1971. He is the recipient of two Army Distinguished Service Medals and one Legion of Merit.

== Post-military life ==
He lived in the Washington, D.C. area from 1959 until 1994, when he moved from Great Falls to Baltimore. He died of a heart attack on 19 August 1998.
