= Michael J. Nardotti Jr. =

United States Army general

Michael Joseph Nardotti Jr.
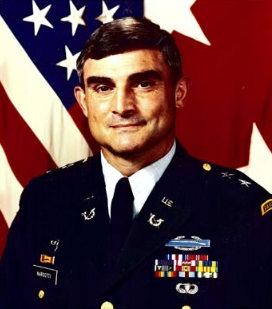
- Major General Michael Joseph Nardotti Jr. 34th Judge Advocate General of the United States Army
- Born: April 30, 1947 (age 79); Brooklyn, New York
- Military career
- Allegiance: United States of America
- Branch: United States Army
- Service years: 1969–1997
- Rank: Major General
- Commands: U.S. Army J.A.G. Corps
- Conflicts: Vietnam War
- Awards: Distinguished Service Medal; Silver Star; Bronze Star

Major General Michael Joseph Nardotti Jr., USA (born April 30, 1947) is an American lawyer and retired Army officer. He served as the Judge Advocate General of the United States Army from 1993 to 1997. He is a 1969 graduate of the United States Military Academy with a B.S. degree and received his J.D. degree from Fordham University in 1976. Nardotti is a partner at the law firm of Squire Patton Boggs, serving as the co-managing partner of the Washington, D.C. office.

== Awards and decorations ==
Distinguished Service Medal
Silver Star
Bronze Star
Purple Heart
Meritorious Service Medal (with three silver oak leaf clusters)
Air Medal
Army Commendation Medal (with valor device and one bronze oak leaf cluster)
Vietnam Gallantry Cross Unit Citation
National Defense Service Medal (with one bronze service star)
Vietnam Service Medal
Army Service Ribbon
Overseas Service Ribbon
Vietnam Campaign Medal

Nardotti was inducted into the U.S. Army Ranger Hall of Fame in 2006.

== Gallery ==
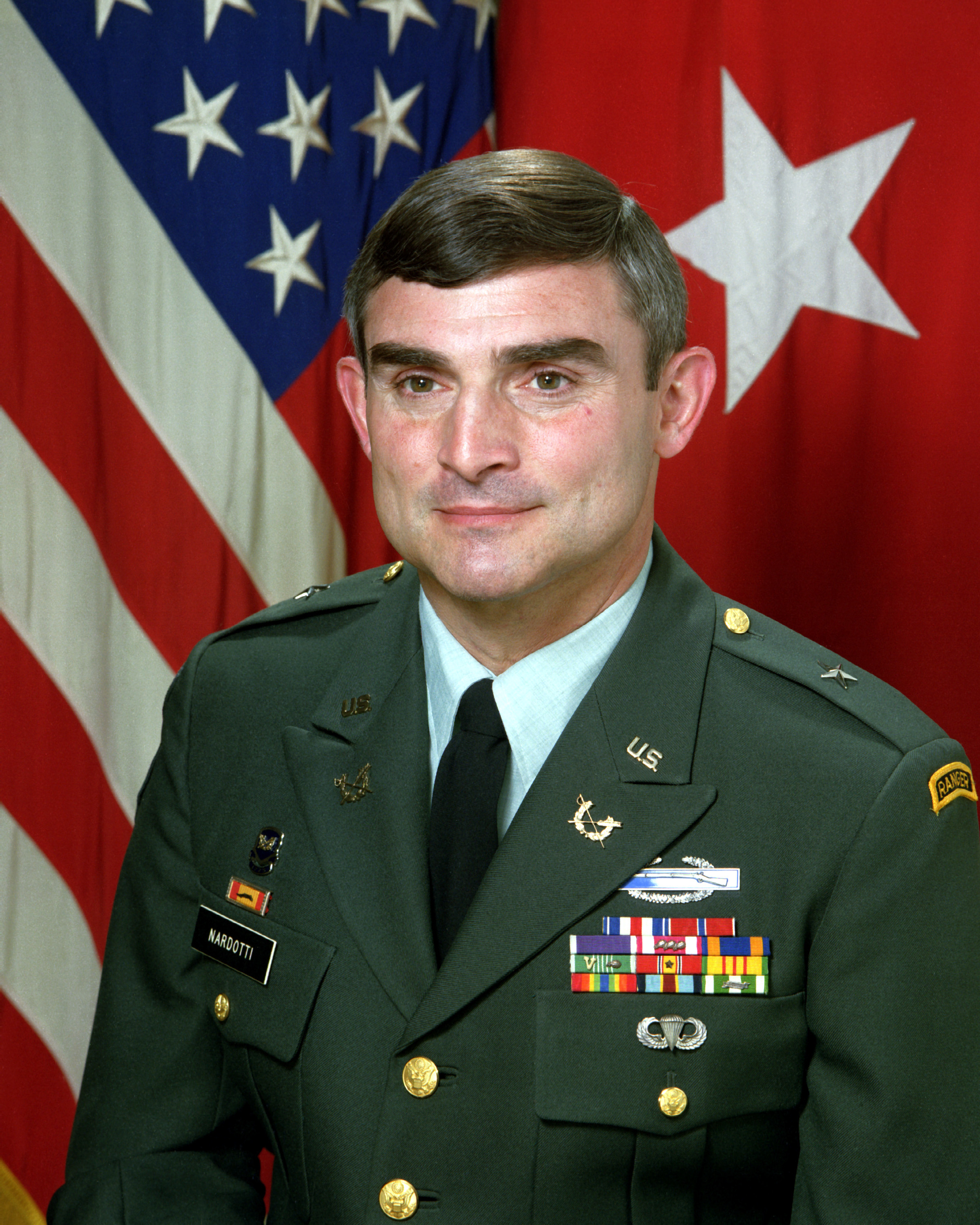

Military offices
Preceded by John L. Fugh	Judge Advocate General of the United States Army; 1993–1997	Succeeded by Walter B. Huffman
