= Scott S. Harris =

Clerk of the U.S. Supreme Court

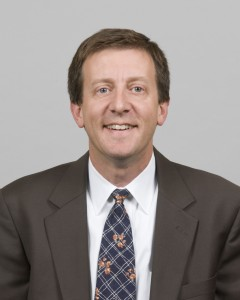

20th Clerk of the Supreme Court of the United States
- Incumbent
- Assumed office September 1, 2013
- Preceded by: William K. Suter

Personal details
- Born: Scott Sessions Harris; November 7, 1965 (age 60)
- Education: Yale University (BS); University of Virginia (JD)

Scott Sessions Harris (born November 7, 1965) is an American lawyer serving since September 2013 as the 20th Clerk of the Supreme Court of the United States. Prior to appointment to his current position, Harris spent 11 years as the Supreme Court's legal counsel. He is the grandson of Baseball Hall of Fame member Bucky Harris, who was the manager of the Washington Senators.

== Early life and education ==
Harris attended Landon School before he completed his undergraduate work at Yale University in 1988. He entered the University of Virginia School of Law two years later, earning his juris doctor in 1993. He was admitted to the bar the next year.

== Career ==
After graduating from law school, Harris served as a law clerk for Paul V. Niemeyer, judge of the United States Court of Appeals for the Fourth Circuit in Richmond, Virginia. He then spent a number of years as an associate at Wiley Rein & Fielding in Washington, D.C. before becoming an Assistant United States Attorney.

In 2002 he became legal counsel at the U.S. Supreme Court. The Court announced on July 1, 2013 that Harris would replace longtime Supreme Court clerk William K. Suter after the latter's retirement on August 31. Harris is the 20th person to hold this position.

Legal offices
Preceded by William K. Suter	Clerk of the Supreme Court of the United States; 2013–present	Incumbent
