= Elias B. Caldwell =

3rd Clerk of the U.S. Supreme Court (1776–1825)

Elias Boudinot Caldwell
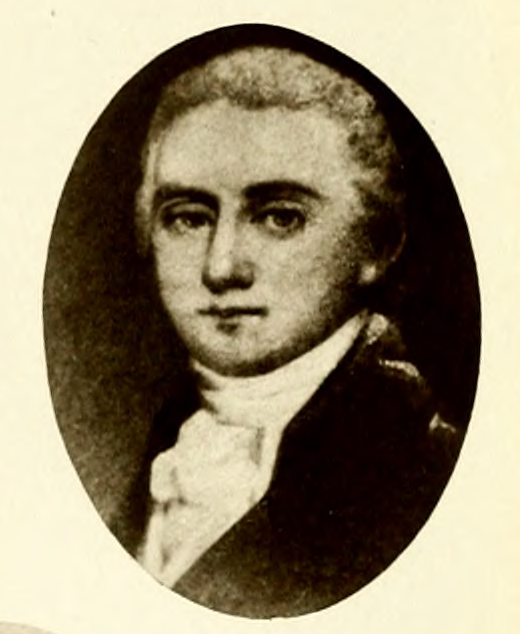

Clerk of the Supreme Court
- In office 1800–1825
- Preceded by: Samuel Bayard
- Succeeded by: William Griffith

Personal details
- Born: April 3, 1776 Elizabethtown, New Jersey, U.S.
- Died: May 30, 1825 (aged 49) Washington, District of Columbia, U.S.
- Children: Anna Maria Caldwell, Elias Boyd Caldwell, Harriett Caldwell, John Edward Caldwell, Mary Custis (Caldwell) Smith, Hannah Ogden Caldwell, Susan Caldwell
- Education: Princeton University

Elias Boudinot Caldwell (April 3, 1776 – May 30, 1825) was a Clerk of the Supreme Court of the United States.

Born in Elizabethtown, New Jersey, Caldwell was two-years-old when his mother, Hannah, was killed by British troops passing through their farm. A short time later in 1781 Reverend James Caldwell, his father, was murdered and Caldwell was adopted by Elias Boudinot, for whom he was named. Caldwell graduated from the College of New Jersey (now Princeton University) and studied law with the said Elias Boudinot until his move to the District of Columbia.

Caldwell worked as a lawyer in Washington, D.C alongside Francis Scott Key for a number of years. Both men were organizing members of the American Society for Colonizing the Free People of Color in the United States. Caldwell was the organization's secretary, and Key was on the board of managers. According to David Walker (abolitionist), Caldwell stated during the organization's founding, in reference to enslaved Americans: "The more you improve the condition of these people, the more you cultivate their minds, the more miserable you make them in their present state. You give them a higher relish for those privileges which they can never attain, and turn what we intend for a blessing into a curse."

At the age of twenty-four, in 1800, Caldwell was appointed clerk of the Supreme Court at Washington and held this post until his death in 1825.

== Sources ==
- "Sketch of Elias Boudinot Caldwell". American Monthly Magazine. 24: 204–213. 1893. JSTOR 40067168.
- "O Say Can You See: Early Washington, DC Law & Family Project". Center for Digital Research in the Humanities.
- Walker, David (1829). Appeal... to the Coloured Citizens of the World, but in Particular and very Expressly, to those of the United States of America.

Legal offices	Clerk of the Supreme Court of the United States; 1800-1825	Death
