= Thomas H. Green =

American lawyer

Thomas Henry Green
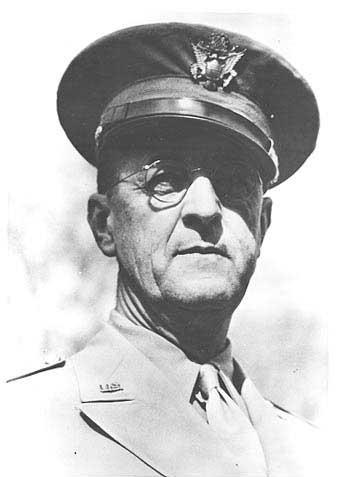
- Born: April 22, 1889; Cambridge, Massachusetts, US
- Died: March 27, 1971 (aged 81); United States
- Military career
- Allegiance: United States of America
- Branch: United States Army
- Service years: 1917–1949
- Rank: Major General
- Commands: Judge Advocate General
- Conflicts: World War I World War II
- Awards: Distinguished Service Medal (2)

Thomas Henry Green (April 22, 1889 – March 27, 1971) was an American military officer with the rank of major general, who served as Judge Advocate General of the United States Army from 1945 to 1949.

== Early years ==
Thomas Henry Green was born on April 22, 1889, in Cambridge, Massachusetts. Green attended Boston University and received a Bachelor of Law Degree in 1915. He practiced law in Boston for some time.

His military career began back in February 1913, when he enlisted in the Massachusetts National Guard as a private in troop A, 1st Massachusetts Cavalry. Green served with his national guard unit on Mexican Border in 1916 and was also commissioned a second lieutenant of cavalry in the Regular Army, in 1917.

During World War I, Green was promoted to the temporary rank of major and ordered to the Western Front with the 2nd Cavalry Regiment, where he served with the American Expeditionary Forces (AEF) in throughout 1918. He participated in the Meuse–Argonne offensive as a battalion commander during the final weeks of the war.

After the war, Green attended the George Washington University and received a Master of Laws degree in 1923. Subsequently, he served as Assistant Judge Advocate of the 2nd Corps at Governors Island, New York City. In 1939, Green was appointed a Chief of Patent Section in Military Affairs Section, Washington D.C.

== Second World War ==
He was assigned to Fort Shafter, Hawaii, in August 1940 as Judge Advocate of the Hawaiian Department. Green was a lieutenant colonel at the time of the December 1941 attack on Pearl Harbor, which brought the United States into World War II. He was than appointed an executive officer to the Military Governor of Hawaiian Islands, Lieutenant General Delos C. Emmons, and stayed in this capacity until 1943.

Green was promoted to the rank of brigadier general on May 24, 1942. Following his service in Hawaii, he was transferred to the Washington, D.C., where he was appointed a Judge Advocate General, deputy of JAG, major general Myron C. Cramer. In this capacity, he was responsible for Military Justice and later also for Civil Justice.

He served in this capacity until December 1945, when Major General Cramer was retired and Green replaced him. Green was also promoted to the rank of major general on December 1, 1945.

Green served as JAG until November 30, 1949, when he finally retired from the army. He was replaced by Maor General Ernest M. Brannon. For his service during World War II, Major General Green received an Army Distinguished Service Medal with Oak Leaf Cluster and five Army Commendation Medals.

== Life in retirement ==
After retirement from the Army, Green worked as professor of law and professor emeritus at the University of Arizona until his death. Henry Green died on March 27, 1971, at the age of 81. He is buried together with his wife Ruth Tuthill Green (1895–1988) at Indian Mound Cemetery in Moravia, New York.

== Decorations ==
Major general Thomas H. Green received some decorations for his military service. Here is his ribbon bar:

1st Row	Army Distinguished Service Medal with Oak Leaf Cluster	Army Commendation Medal with four Oak Leaf Clusters	Mexican Border Service Medal	World War I Victory Medal with two battle clasps
2nd Row	American Defense Service Medal with Base Clasp	American Campaign Medal	Asiatic-Pacific Campaign Medal with one service star	World War II Victory Medal
