= Joseph F. Spaniol Jr. =

18th Clerk of the U.S. Supreme Court

18th Clerk of the Supreme Court of the United States
- In office August 1, 1985 – February 1, 1991
- Preceded by: Alexander L. Stevas
- Succeeded by: William K. Suter

Personal details
- Born: Joseph Frederick Spaniol Jr. Columbus, Ohio, U.S.
- Spouse: Viola Mae Montz
- Education: John Carroll University; Case Western Reserve University School of Law; Georgetown University

Joseph Frederick Spaniol Jr. was the 18th Clerk of the Supreme Court of the United States, a position he held from 1985 to 1991.

Spaniol was a graduate of John Carroll University and the Case Western Reserve University School of Law.

His wife, Viola, died from cancer in 2002. At the time of her death, the couple had eight surviving children.

Legal offices
Preceded by Alexander L. Stevas	Clerk of the Supreme Court of the United States; 1985–1991	Succeeded by William K. Suter
