= Lawyers for Children =

Lawyers For Children (LFC) was created in 1984 with the mission to advocate on behalf of children in foster care in New York City. LFC also advocates for immigration rights, mental health services, and victims of child sexual abuse, in addition to providing evaluations and education.

Lawyers For Children has represented more than 40,000 foster, adopted, and abused children and young adults. Lawyers For Children participated in the case Nicholson v. Williams, a class action suit "that forced the NYC Administration for Children’s Services to do case-by-case evaluations to determine if removal is necessary rather than automatic if a parent is a victim of domestic violence." LFC has been recognized for its best-practices advocacy model in which attorneys are paired with social workers to represent each and every LFC client.

In 2008, the organization received the American Bar Association's Hodson Award for "sustained, outstanding performance or a specific and extraordinary service by a government or public sector law office".
