= John F. Davis (lawyer) =

American lawyer

14th Clerk of the Supreme Court of the United States
- In office September 1, 1961 – August 31, 1970
- Preceded by: James R. Browning
- Succeeded by: E. Robert Seaver

Personal details
- Born: John F. Davis; July 11, 1907 Portland, Maine, U.S.
- Died: July 18, 2000 (aged 93) Washington, D.C., U.S.
- Education: Bates College; Harvard Law School
- Occupation: Lawyer, public official

John F. Davis (July 11, 1907 – July 18, 2000) was an American lawyer, law clerk, and law professor whose career included work on the defense team of Alger Hiss (including "director of the Hiss investigations in Washington") from 1948 to 1950" and ten years of service as the 14th Clerk of the Supreme Court of the United States from September 1, 1961 to August 31, 1970.

== Early life, education, and family ==
John F. Davis was born on July 11, 1907, in Portland, Maine. His parents were Marshall Davis and Marguerite Gifford. He attended the public schools in Portland, graduating from high school in 1924.

He attended Bates College, graduating in 1928 Phi Beta Kappa, and Harvard Law School, from which he obtained his law degree in 1932. He worked on the Harvard Law Review.

== Career ==
Davis's first job was with Robb, Clark, and Bennet in New York City.

=== Civil service ===
In 1933, Davis became a government attorney at the United States Department of the Interior. In 1936, he briefly worked for a U.S. Senate committee investigating railroad finance, then moved to the Securities and Exchange Commission (SEC). During World War II, he worked as counsel for the United States Coast Guard.

=== Private law practice ===
In 1947, Davis returned to private practice in Washington, DC. By 1948, he had become one of four partners in the law firm of Hilmer & Davis at 1700 I Street NW.

=== Hiss case ===
Davis is best remembered as one of the defense attorneys who represented accused Soviet espionage agent Alger Hiss before the House Committee on Un-American Activities in 1948 and at Hiss's two 1949–50 trials for perjury in the Southern District of New York.

On August 25, 1948, Davis first appeared as counsel to Hiss on "Confrontation Day", when Hiss and Whittaker Chambers (who, under subpoena, had testified about Soviet underground networks he had run in Washington in the 1930s, including the Ware Group, of which Hiss was a member). In September 1948, he worked with William L. Marbury, Jr. After the U.S. Department of Justice indicted Hiss on two counts of perjury, Davis served on his defense team under Edward Cochrane McLean.

After Hiss's conviction in January 1950, although Hiss worked for the rest of his life to prove his innocence, Davis (like Marbury and McLean) did not partake in those efforts.

In 1974, Allen Weinstein interviewed Davis for his book Perjury: The Hiss-Chambers Case. According to Weinstein, Davis said that Hiss had contacted him in December 1948 about an "old typewriter" turned out to be the Woodstock typewriter used for scores of stolen documents that formed evidence during the two trials of Hiss in 1949. Davis also recommended that the Hiss defense team build an identical typewriter to prove "forgery by typewriter", but experts were unable to do so.

=== Civil service again ===
During the 1950s, Davis served as an assistant Solicitor General in the U.S. Department of Justice. He argued more than 50 cases before the U.S. Supreme Court. These included a government antitrust case against the DuPont Company, which forced it to divest from General Motors Corporation of $2.5 Billion or 23% of GM stock.

In 1961, Davis was appointed Clerk of the Supreme Court under Chief Justice Earl Warren, succeeding James R. Browning, who had been appointed to a federal judgeship by President Kennedy. As Clerk, Davis was responsible for maintaining the Court's docket and files. He also administered the oath of office to several new Justices, including Thurgood Marshall, the Court's first African American member, and Chief Justice Warren E. Burger.

Davis served as Clerk of the Supreme Court until 1970, when he returned to private practice in Washington, also serving during the 1970s as a special master for the Supreme Court in two cases within the Court's original jurisdiction and co-authoring a law review article on the precedential effect of Supreme Court opinions approved by only a plurality (as opposed to a majority) of the Justices.

=== Law School ===
Davis also taught during the 1970s as a law professor at Georgetown University and later at the University of Maryland School of Law. He retired from the latter position in 1988.

== Personal and death ==
In 1937, Davis married Valre Talley (died in 1978). He later married Jane Mason. He had two children, a son named Marcus and a daughter named Susan.

He was a member of the American Law Institute.

Davis died age 93 on July 18, 2000, exactly one week after his birthday, in Washington, DC. His survivors were his wife, son Marcus and daughter Susan, stepchildren Clint and Timothy Keeney Jr., five grandchildren, and five great-grandchildren.

Lawyer, professor, and biographer G. Edward White is a son-in-law.

== Legacy ==
A portrait of Davis hangs in the Supreme Court.

Davis believed that Hiss was innocent of espionage.

In a 2004 memoir, Garry Wills noted that Hiss lied about not taking counsel to his first HUAC hearing on August 5, 1948: Hiss took Davis.

== See also ==
- Alger Hiss
- Earl Warren

== External sources ==
- Statement on Davis's retirement as Clerk by Chief Justice Warren E. Burger, 398 U.S. vii (1970).
- Davis, Oscar H.; Freeman, Milton V.; Friedman, Daniel M.; White, G. Edward; Reynolds, William L. (1988). "Tributes to Professor John F. Davis". Maryland Law Review. 47 (3).
