= Clerk of the Supreme Court of the United States =

Chief administrator of the U.S. Supreme Court

The clerk of the Supreme Court of the United States is the officer of the Supreme Court of the United States responsible for overseeing filings with the court and maintaining its records. The current clerk is Scott S. Harris.

== History ==
The first clerk was appointed on February 3, 1790, two days after the first session of the court itself. The position had been authorized by Congress on September 24, 1789, with the position's purpose being to "enter and record all the orders, decrees, judgments and proceedings of the said court."

The Judicial Code (28 U.S.C. § 671) provides that the clerk is appointed, and may be removed, by order of the Supreme Court. The clerk's duties are prescribed by the statute and by Supreme Court Rule 1, and by the court's customs and practices.

The clerk of the Supreme Court is a court clerk. The role of the clerk and deputies or assistants should not be confused with the court's law clerks, who assist the justices by conducting research, making recommendations on which cases to hear, and preparing drafts of opinions.

The Clerk's Office is responsible for maintaining the dockets and records of the court. However, since approximately 1960, most of the court's non-current case files and other records have been placed in the custody of the National Archives and Records Administration.

The clerk is one of the court's four statutory officers. The others are the marshal, the librarian, and the reporter of decisions.

Traditionally unlike others, the clerk and deputies wear morning coats when performing their duties as the court is in session.

One of the traditional duties of the clerk was holding the Bible at presidential inaugurations. James R. Browning became the last clerk to perform this duty at John F. Kennedy's inauguration on January 20, 1961. Four years later, at Lyndon B. Johnson's inauguration, Lady Bird Johnson began the tradition of the First Lady holding the Bible, which continues today.

== List of clerks ==
- John Tucker (1790–1791)
- Samuel Bayard (1791–1800)
- Elias B. Caldwell (1800–1825)
- William Griffith (1826–1827)
- William T. Carroll (1827–1863)
- D. W. Middleton (1863–1880)
- J. H. McKenney (1880–1913)
- James D. Maher (1913–1921)
- William R. Stansbury (1921–1927)
- Charles Elmore Cropley (1927–1952)
- Harold B. Willey (1952–1956)
- John T. Fey (1956–1958)
- James R. Browning (1958–1961)
- John F. Davis (1961–1970)
- E. Robert Seaver (1970–1972)
- Michael Rodak, Jr. (1972–1981)
- Alexander L. Stevas (1981–1985)
- Joseph F. Spaniol, Jr. (1985–1991)
- William K. Suter (1991–2013)
- Scott S. Harris (2013–present)

== See also ==
- Court clerk
- Procedures of the Supreme Court of the United States
