= Charles Elmore Cropley =

Clerk of the Supreme Court of the United States

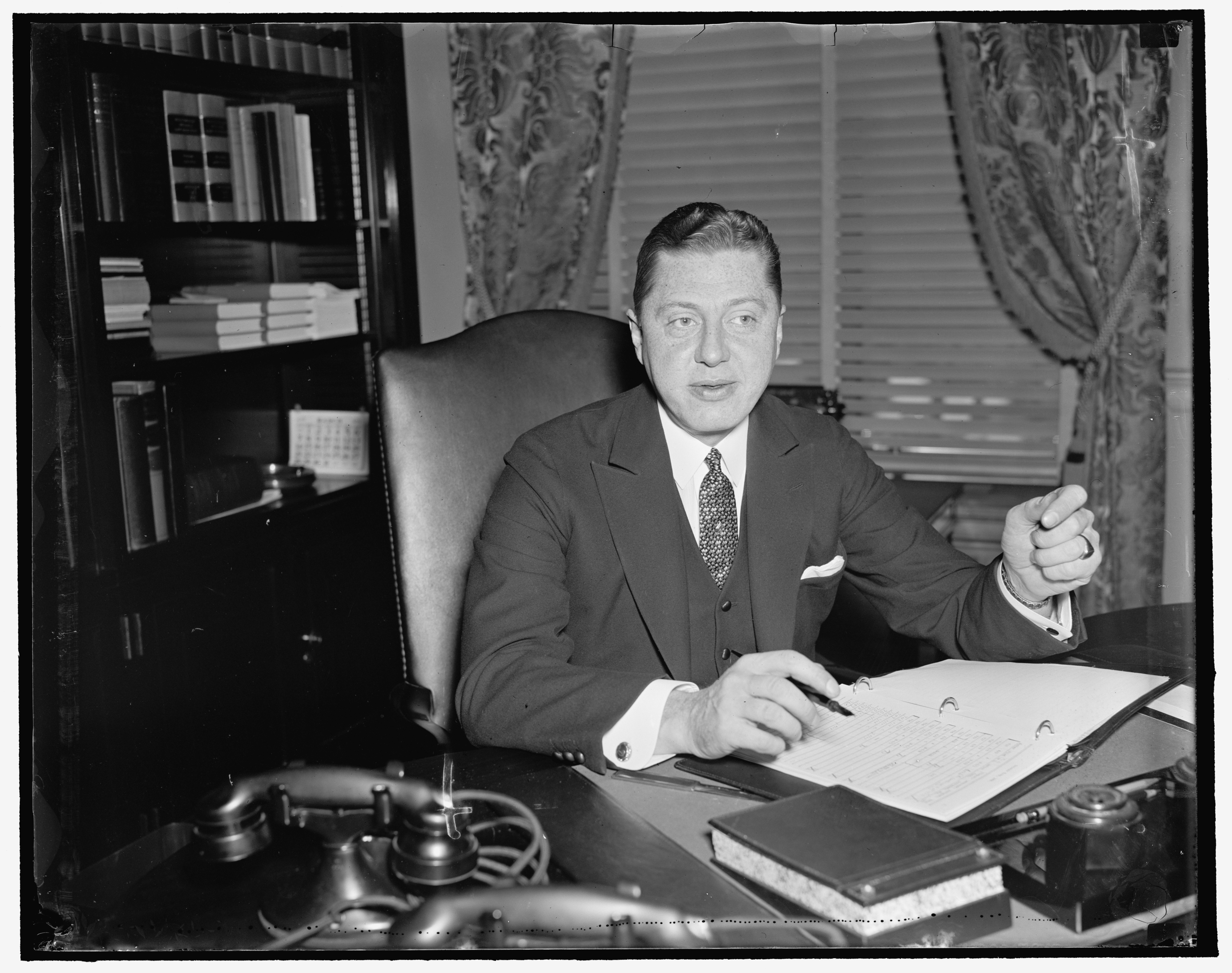
- Born: 1894
- Died: 1952 (aged 57–58)
- Occupation: Clerk of the Supreme Court of the United States

Charles Elmore Cropley (1894–1952) served as Clerk of the Supreme Court of the United States for a quarter of a century, from 1927 until his death in 1952. He began his work for the court as a page, and, with the exception of two years, worked for it his whole life. Beginning his tenure as clerk when he was thirty-three years old, Cropley was the youngest clerk in Supreme Court history. The Clerk of the Court routinely secured Bibles for use in presidential inaugurations and also typically held the Bible while the Chief Justice swore the oath to the President-elect. Cropley dropped FDR's family Dutch Bible after FDR took his oath upon it in 1941. He married Roma Virginia Wornal.
