= Hugh R. Overholt =

United States Army general

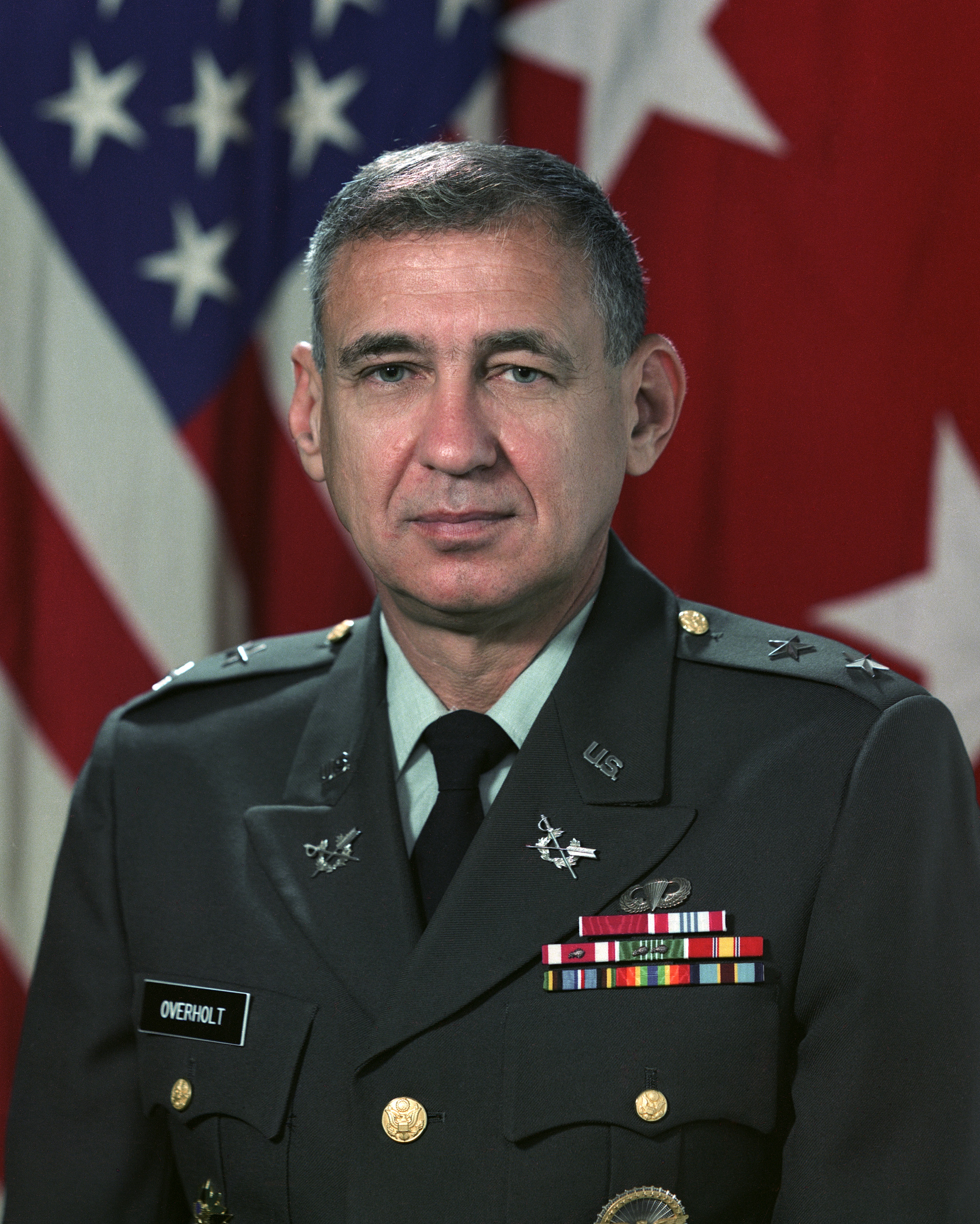
- Born: October 29, 1933 (age 92); Beebe, Arkansas U.S.
- Military career
- Allegiance: United States
- Branch: United States Army
- Service years: 1957–1989
- Rank: Major General
- Commands: Judge Advocate General of the United States Army

Hugh Robert Overholt (born October 29, 1933) is a retired major general in the United States Army. Overholt served as Deputy Judge Advocate General of the United States Army from 1981 to 1985 before serving as Judge Advocate General of the United States Army from 1985 to 1989. He attended the University of Arkansas, earning a B.A. degree in classics in 1955 and an LL.B. degree in 1957.
