= Heinz Cramer =

- Born: 24 May 1911
- Died: 5 September 2003 (aged 92)
- Military career
- Allegiance: Nazi Germany; West Germany
- Branch: Luftwaffe; German Air Force
- Rank: Brigadegeneral
- Conflicts: World War II
- Awards: Knight's Cross of the Iron Cross

Heinz Cramer (24 May 1911 – 5 September 2003) was a German pilot during World War II, and a recipient of the Knight's Cross of the Iron Cross of Nazi Germany. Cramer was shot down by British fighters in September 1940 and was held until 1947. He later joined the Bundeswehr and retired in 1966 as a Brigadegeneral.

== Awards and decorations ==
- Knight's Cross of the Iron Cross on 18 September 1940 as Major and Gruppenkommandeur of the II.(K)/Lehrgeschwader 1
