= Thomas E. Ayres =

United States Army general (born 1962)

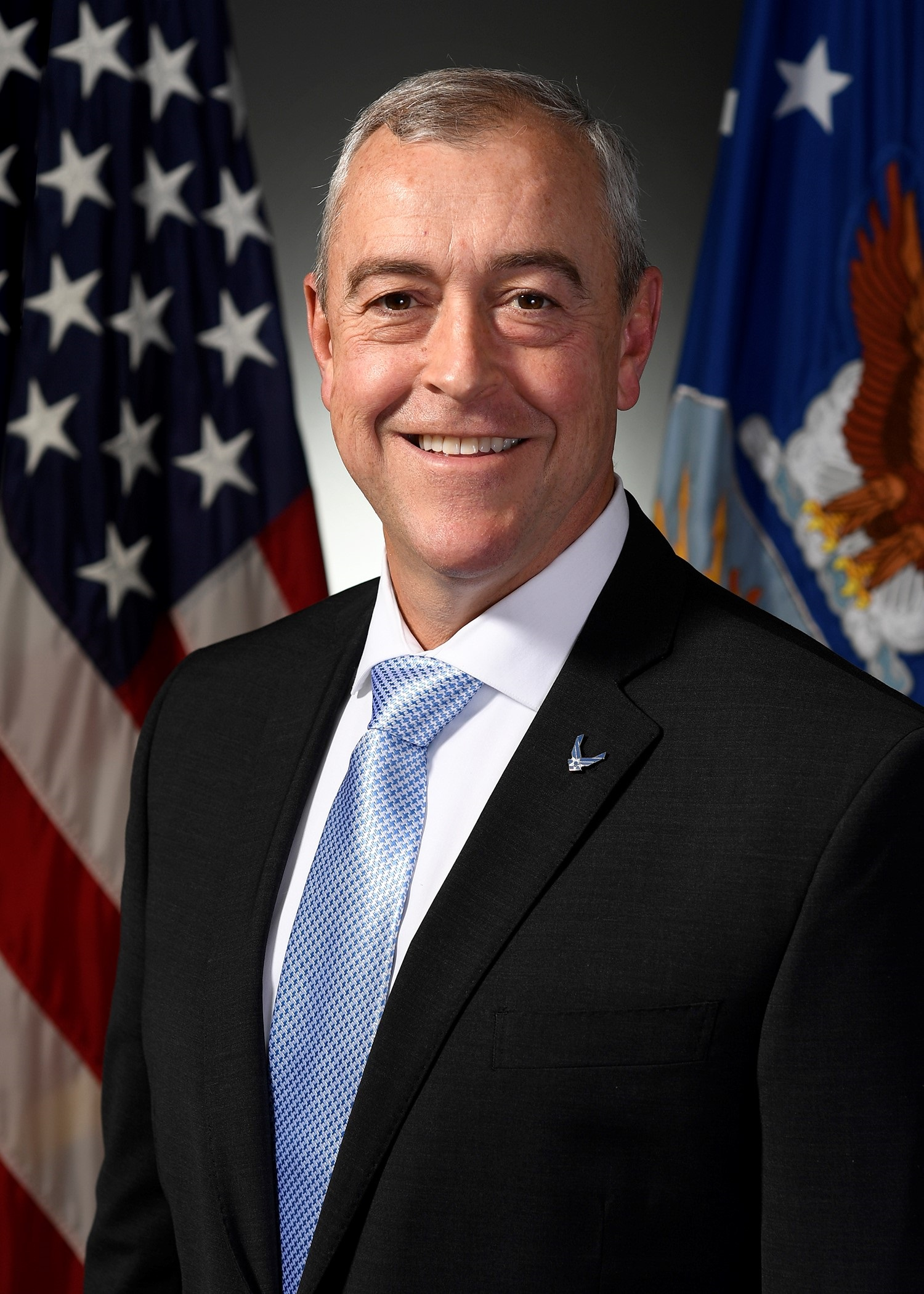

General Counsel of the United States Air Force
- In office February 15, 2018 – January 20, 2021
- President: Donald Trump
- Secretary: Heather Wilson; Matthew Donovan (acting); Barbara Barrett
- Preceded by: Joseph M. McDade, Jr. (acting)
- Succeeded by: Craig A. Smith (acting)

Personal details
- Born: Thomas Everett Ayres; October 23, 1962 (age 63) Kentucky, U.S.

Military service
- Allegiance: United States
- Branch/service: United States Army
- Years of service: 1984 – 2017
- Rank: Major General
- Commands: Deputy Judge Advocate General of the United States Army
- Battles/wars: War on Terror; Iraq War; Afghanistan War
- Awards: Defense Superior Service Medal; Legion of Merit (3); Bronze Star Medal (3); Defense Meritorious Service Medal; Meritorious Service Medal (4)

Major General Thomas E. Ayres (born October 23, 1962) is a retired American military lawyer who served as the 20th Deputy Judge Advocate General of the United States Army.

On January 18, 2018, President Donald Trump nominated him to become General Counsel of the Department of the Air Force. This nomination was confirmed by the U.S. Senate on February 15, 2018.

== Education ==
Born in Kentucky and raised in Pennsylvania, Major General Ayres graduated from the United States Military Academy in 1984, receiving a commission as a Second Lieutenant in the U.S. Army Infantry. He was selected for the Funded Legal Education Program and earned a Juris Doctor from the University of Pennsylvania School of Law in 1991. He attended the Judge Advocate Basic and Graduate Courses, the Army Command and General Staff College, and the Army War College.

== Military career ==
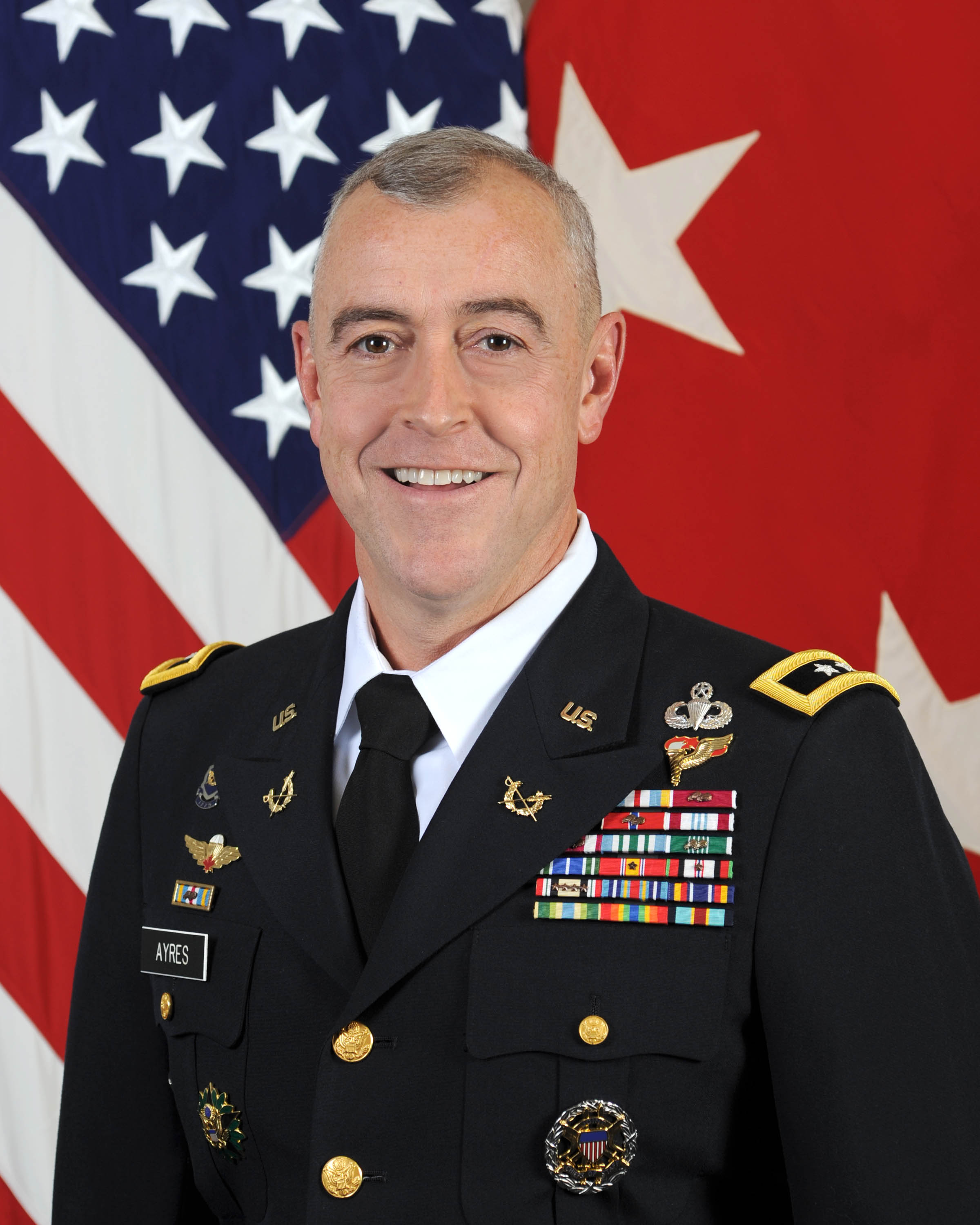
Ayres Army portrait

Prior to assuming duty as the Deputy Judge Advocate General on October 1, 2013, Major General Ayres most recently served as the Commander, U.S. Army Legal Services Agency and Chief Judge, U.S. Army Court of Criminal Appeals. His former key duty positions include: Commander and Commandant of The Judge Advocate General's Legal Center and School; Assistant Judge Advocate General for Military Law and Operations; Deputy Legal Counsel to the Chairman of the Joint Chiefs of Staff; SJA, Multi-National Corps-Iraq; SJA, XVIII Airborne Corps and Fort Bragg; SJA, 82d Airborne Division, including tours as the SJA for Coalition Task Force 82, Operation Enduring Freedom, Afghanistan, SJA for Task Force 82, Operation Iraqi Freedom, and Task Force All-American, Operation Iraqi Freedom.

Other assignments include: Trial Counsel, Senior Prosecutor and Chief of Criminal Law, 24th Infantry Division (Mechanized); Environmental Law and Litigation Attorney, United States Army Legal Services Agency; Deputy Staff Judge Advocate, 82d Airborne Division; and Deputy Staff Judge Advocate, XVIII Airborne Corps.

Major General Ayres's decorations include the Defense Superior Service Medal, Legion of Merit with four Bronze Oak Leaf Clusters, Bronze Star Medal with two Bronze Oak Leaf Clusters, Defense Meritorious Service Medal, Meritorious Service Medal with three Bronze Oak Leaf Cluster, Joint Service Commendation Medal, Army Commendation Medal with two Bronze Oak Leaf, and Army Achievement Medal. He is also entitled to wear the U.S. Army Master Parachutist Badge, U.S. Army Pathfinder Badge, the Army Staff Identification Badge, and the Joint Chiefs of Staff Identification Badge.
