= G. B. Greene Jr. =

American air force general

George B. Greene Jr.
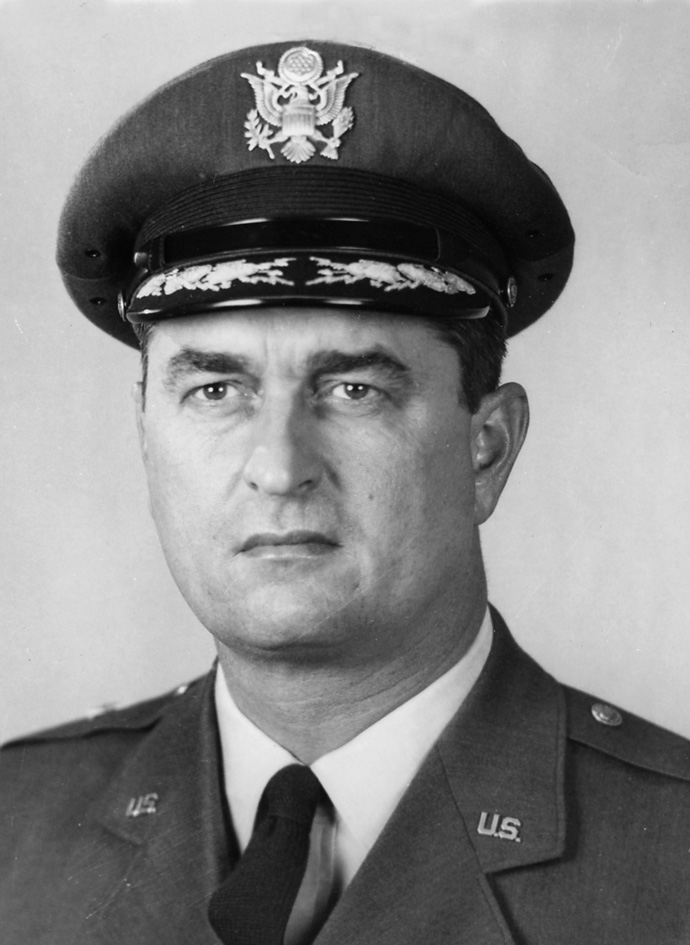
- Born: April 20, 1914; Laurens, South Carolina
- Died: August 15, 1998 (aged 84); McQueeney, Texas
- Military career
- Allegiance: United States of America
- Branch: United States Air Force
- Service years: 1935–1970
- Rank: Major General
- Commands: Lackland Military Training Center; Lackland Air Force Base
- Awards: Distinguished Service Medal, Distinguished Service Cross, Silver Star, Legion of Merit and the Air Medal

George Benjamin Greene Jr. (April 20, 1914 – August 15, 1998) was an American Air Force major general who was commander of Lackland Military Training Center, Air Training Command, and Lackland Air Force Base, San Antonio, Texas. In the dual capacity he was responsible for the operation of one of the largest installations in the Air Force as well as for the direction of a wide range of training functions at the base.

== Early life and education ==
Greene was born in Laurens, South Carolina, in 1914. After graduating from high school in Anderson, South Carolina, he attended Clemson University, obtaining his Bachelor of Science degree in 1935.

== Career ==
He was appointed a second lieutenant in the Organized Reserve Corps, June 4, 1935, enlisted as an aviation cadet in January 1937, and completed flying training and received his pilot wings at Kelly Field, Texas, in January 1938.

Greene was then assigned to the 8th Pursuit Group, Langley Field, Virginia, as a pilot and group engineering officer. He became commander of the 35th Pursuit Squadron in December 1941 and moved with it to the Pacific Theater of Operations, serving in New Guinea. He flew 68 combat missions totaling 200 combat hours, all in fighter aircraft, and destroyed three enemy aircraft in air-to-air combat, four on the ground, and one on the water.

Greene was awarded the Distinguished Service Cross by General Douglas MacArthur for extraordinary heroism displayed over New Guinea on April 30, 1942. He received the Silver Star for gallantry in action over Port Morseby, New Guinea, and was awarded the Air Medal for meritorious achievement while participating in aerial flights in the Southwest Pacific area.

Upon his return to the United States in 1943, Greene assumed command of the 423d Reconnaissance Group at De Ridder, Louisiana. In September 1943 he was transferred to Drew Field, Florida, as Assistant A-3 (Operations) for the 3d Fighter Command and later was assigned to the Third Air Force as deputy director of operations and training. In 1946 the Third Air Force became the Tactical Air Command with headquarters at Langley Field, and he served as assistant chief of staff, A-3, of TAC until October 1947.

Greene next was assigned to the 6th Fighter Wing in the Canal Zone as assistant chief of staff, A-3 (Operations). From August 1948 to August 1950 he served with the Caribbean Air Command. His next assignment took him to Stewart Air Force Base, New York, where he served with the Eastern Air Defense Forces.

In August 1951, he went to New Castle County Airport, Delaware, as commander of the 113th Fighter Interceptor Wing and later commanded the 4710th Defense Wing. In August 1952 he entered the Air War College at Maxwell Air Force Base, Alabama, and after graduation in July 1953 he was assigned as commander of the 4708th Defense Wing at Selfridge Air Force Base, Michigan

He became deputy chief of staff for personnel, Air Defense Command, in July 1956; and he was named chief of staff of ADC in July 1959. Moving to Ramstein Air Base, Germany, in August 1960, he became deputy commander of the Seventeenth Air Force. In August 1961 he was named deputy chief of staff for operations at Headquarters, U.S. Air Forces in Europe, Wiesbaden, Germany.

Greene returned to the United States and became director of military personnel, Deputy Chief of Staff for Personnel, at U.S. Air Force Headquarters in July 1963. He moved to the U.S. Air Force Military Personnel Center at Randolph Air Force Base, Texas, in July 1965, to become the assistant deputy chief of staff/personnel for military personnel, the new designation for the military functions which had been moved from Washington to Randolph.

== Later years ==
In July 1967, he was assigned as commander of the Lackland Military Training Center, Air Training Command, and as commander of Lackland Air Force Base, Texas. He retired August 1, 1970. He later died in 1998.

His decorations include the Distinguished Service Medal, Distinguished Service Cross, Silver Star, Legion of Merit and the Air Medal.
