= Myron C. Cramer =

Judge Advocate General of the United States Army

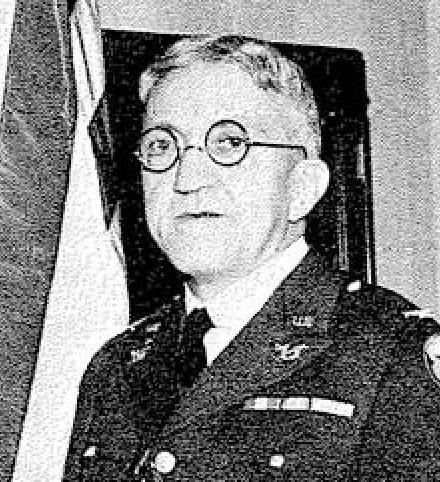
- Born: November 6, 1881; Portland, Connecticut
- Died: March 25, 1966 (aged 84)
- Alma mater: Wesleyan University; Harvard Law School
- Position held: Judge Advocate General of the United States Army

Myron Cady Cramer (1881–1966) was a U.S. Army general who served as Judge Advocate General during World War II when the Judge Advocate General's Department underwent an unprecedented expansion to meet wartime needs and was reorganized.

== Early years ==
Cramer was born in Portland, Connecticut on November 6, 1881. He attended Wesleyan University where he obtained an A.B. degree in 1904, he then entered Harvard Law School, receiving the LL.B. in 1907. Cramer entered the practice of law in New York City, spending three years on the legal staff of a large insurance company. In 1910 he moved to Tacoma, Washington, where, for a time, he engaged in the general practice of law and then served as Deputy Prosecuting Attorney for Pierce County.

== Further life ==
During that time he joined the Washington National Guard as a private, and was commissioned a second lieutenant of cavalry in November 1911. In 1916, while still serving as the deputy county prosecutor, Cramer was called into active service for Mexican border duty. This service concluded, he returned to the prosecuting attorney's office for a brief period before the Guard was again federalized for World War I. First stationed at Camp Greene, North Carolina, Cramer went overseas in January 1918 as a captain with the 41st division. While in France he attended the General Staff College at Langres. Upon his graduation in June 1918 he rejoined the 41st Division as Assistant Chief of Staff. Awarded the Ordre de l'Etoile Noir of France for his World War service, Cramer returned to the United States in July 1919 with the rank of lieutenant colonel. Cramer then resumed his civilian practice in Tacoma for about a year, but in July 1920 accepted a commission as a major in the Judge Advocate General's Department.

As a member of the Regular Army he first served as judge advocate of the 3d Division and later the 4th Division at Fort Lewis, Washington. Other assignments took him to West Point as assistant professor of military law at the United States Military Academy, and to Manila as judge advocate of the Philippine Department.

Returning from Manila, General Cramer became chief of the Contracts Division, JAGO, which office he held until he became The Judge Advocate General on December 1, 1941. Called to the Army's top legal post only days before Pearl Harbor, General Cramer presided over the immense expansion of the Judge Advocate General's Department necessitated by World War II. The proportions of this expansion are reflected by corps strengths: there were 190 judge advocates in the Army in 1941. By 1945 there were 2,162. The workload increased tremendously on all fronts, and new areas of endeavor were undertaken. In the field of military justice, alone, more than 82,000 general court-martial records were reviewed.

During the war years, General Cramer briefly returned to the practice of his predecessors by serving as co-prosecutor of the German saboteurs who landed in Florida and Long Island by submarine in 1942. He was the first Judge Advocate General to serve in this kind of tribunal since the 1860s. The Army joined with the Department of Justice with General Cramer prosecuting for the Army and Francis Biddle for the Justice Department.

After World War II General Cramer retired to private practice in Washington, D.C., but was recalled to active duty in 1946 to act as the United States member of the 11-nation International Military Tribunal for the Far East for disposition of Japanese war crimes, after the resignation of John Patrick Higgins. Upon conclusion of the war crimes trials he returned to his practice.

General Cramer died on March 25, 1966, in Washington, D.C.
