= Ed Tarver =

American politician (1959–2024)

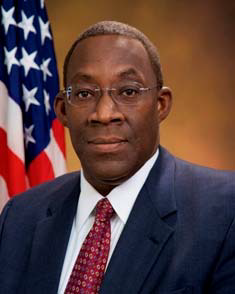

United States Attorney for the Southern District of Georgia
- In office December 2009 – March 10, 2017
- President: Barack Obama; Donald Trump
- Preceded by: Edmund A. Booth Jr.
- Succeeded by: Bobby Christine

Member of the Georgia State Senate from the 22nd district
- In office September 27, 2005 – November 9, 2009
- Preceded by: James Hall
- Succeeded by: Hardie Davis

Personal details
- Born: July 22, 1959 Killeen, Texas, U.S.
- Died: February 9, 2024 (aged 64)
- Party: Democratic
- Education: Augusta College (BA); University of Georgia (JD)

Military service
- Allegiance: United States
- Branch/service: United States Army
- Years of service: 1982–1989
- Rank: Captain

Edward Jerome Tarver (July 22, 1959 – February 9, 2024) was an American lawyer who served as the United States Attorney for the Southern District of Georgia. A Democrat, Tarver was once a Georgia State Senator. He was a candidate for the United States Senate in the 2020 special election in Georgia, receiving 0.5 percent of the vote in the jungle primary.

== Early life and education ==
Edward Jerome Tarver was born on July 22, 1959. His father served in the United States Army and was stationed at Fort Hood at the time of his birth. After his father retired, the family settled in Augusta, Georgia, while Tarver was a sophomore in high school.

Tarver attended Morehouse College on a college football scholarship. He transferred to Augusta College and graduated in 1981. Tarver joined the United States Army and served as a field artillery officer. He reached the rank of captain before being medically discharged after a knee injury that required two surgeries. He attended the University of Georgia School of Law, graduating in 1991.

== Career ==
Tarver served as a law clerk for United States federal judge Dudley H. Bowen Jr. after graduating from law school. He then spent 17 years working for an Augusta law firm.

Tarver ran in the 2004 election to represent the 22nd district in the Georgia State Senate. He lost in the Democratic Party primary election to Charles Walker. After Walker was convicted on charges of corruption, Tarver won the 2005 special election to succeed him. He was sworn in as United States Attorney in December 2009, becoming the first African American United States Attorney from the Southern District of Georgia. He resigned from the state Senate when he was confirmed at U.S. Attorney. A 2017 Savannah Morning News editorial said that Tarver was "one of the best U.S. attorneys in a long line of professional prosecutors who have held this important appointed post." Tarver considered running for the 2016 election to the United States Senate as a member of the Democratic Party. In 2017, at the beginning of the presidency of Donald Trump, Tarver was asked to resign.

In February 2020, Tarver registered to run in the 2020 special election. Despite early polls showing him with the support of up to 5% of voters, he failed to gain traction in the primary as Democrats rallied around eventual winner Raphael Warnock. In the first round of the election, Tarver finished 14th out of 20 candidates with 26,333 or 0.54% of the vote.

== Personal life and death ==
Tarver's wife of six years is Carol Dale Thompson. He has two children from a prior marriage. Ed Tarver died on February 9, 2024, at the age of 64 from complications following surgery in December.

== See also ==
- 2017 dismissal of U.S. attorneys

Georgia State Senate
Preceded by James Randal Hall	Member of the Georgia State Senate from the 22nd district 2005–2009	Succeeded by Hardie Davis
Legal offices
Preceded by Edmund Booth	U.S. Attorney for the Southern District of Georgia; 2009–2017	Succeeded by Bobby Christine
