= 2020–21 United States Senate special election in Georgia =

- November 3, 2020 (first round); January 5, 2021 (runoff)
- Turnout: 65.3% ▲ (first round); 59.7% ▼ (runoff)
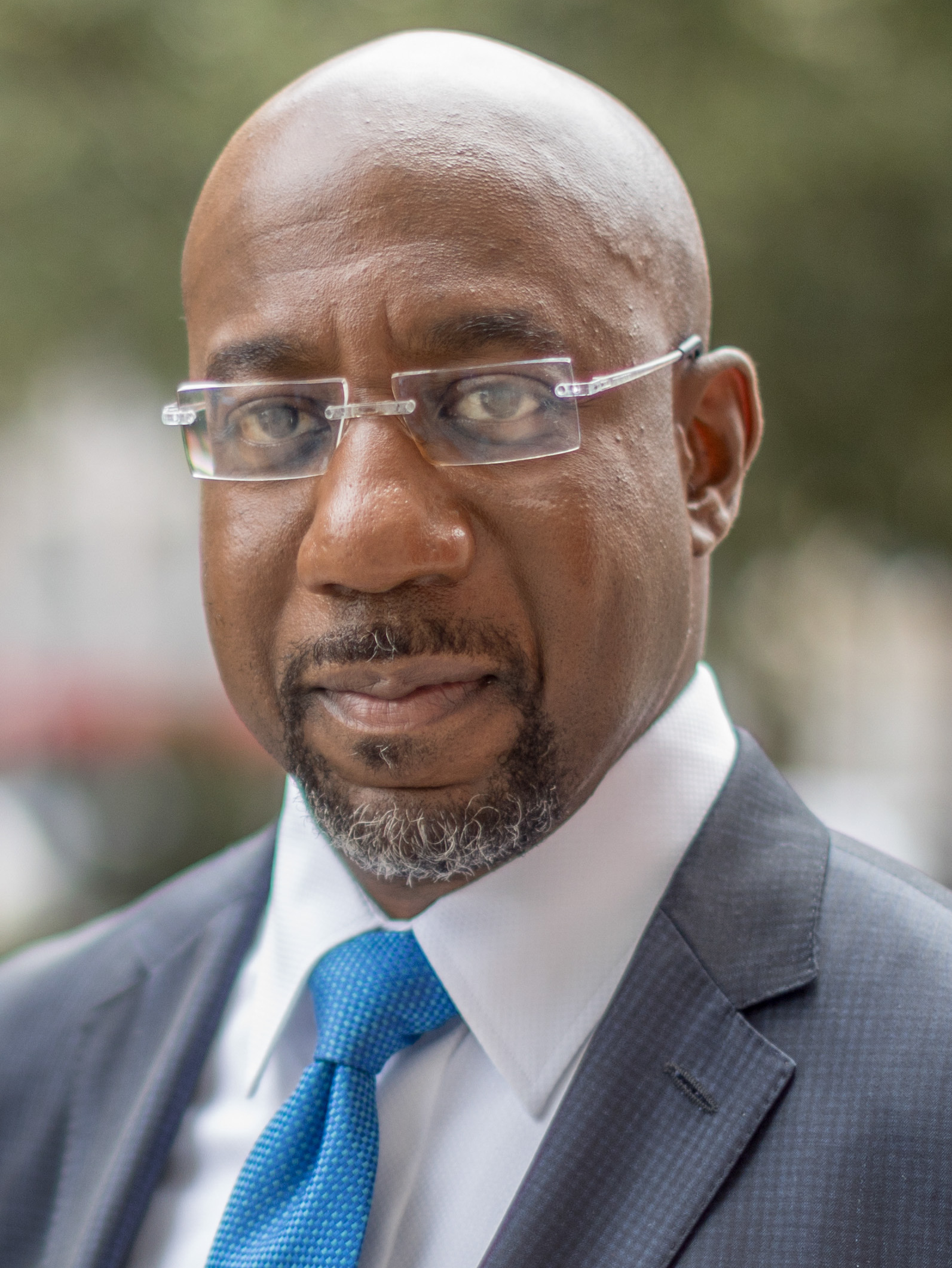

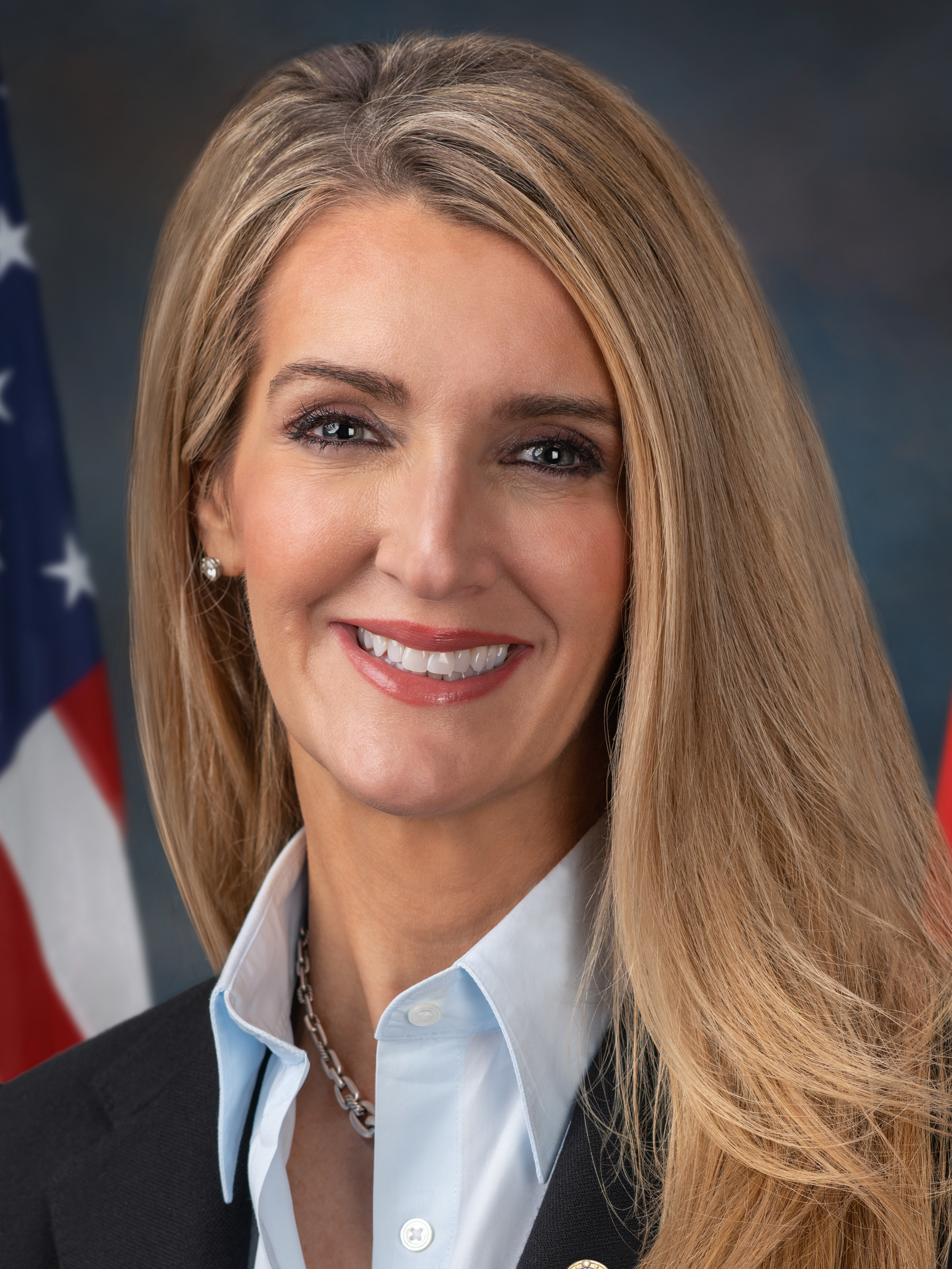

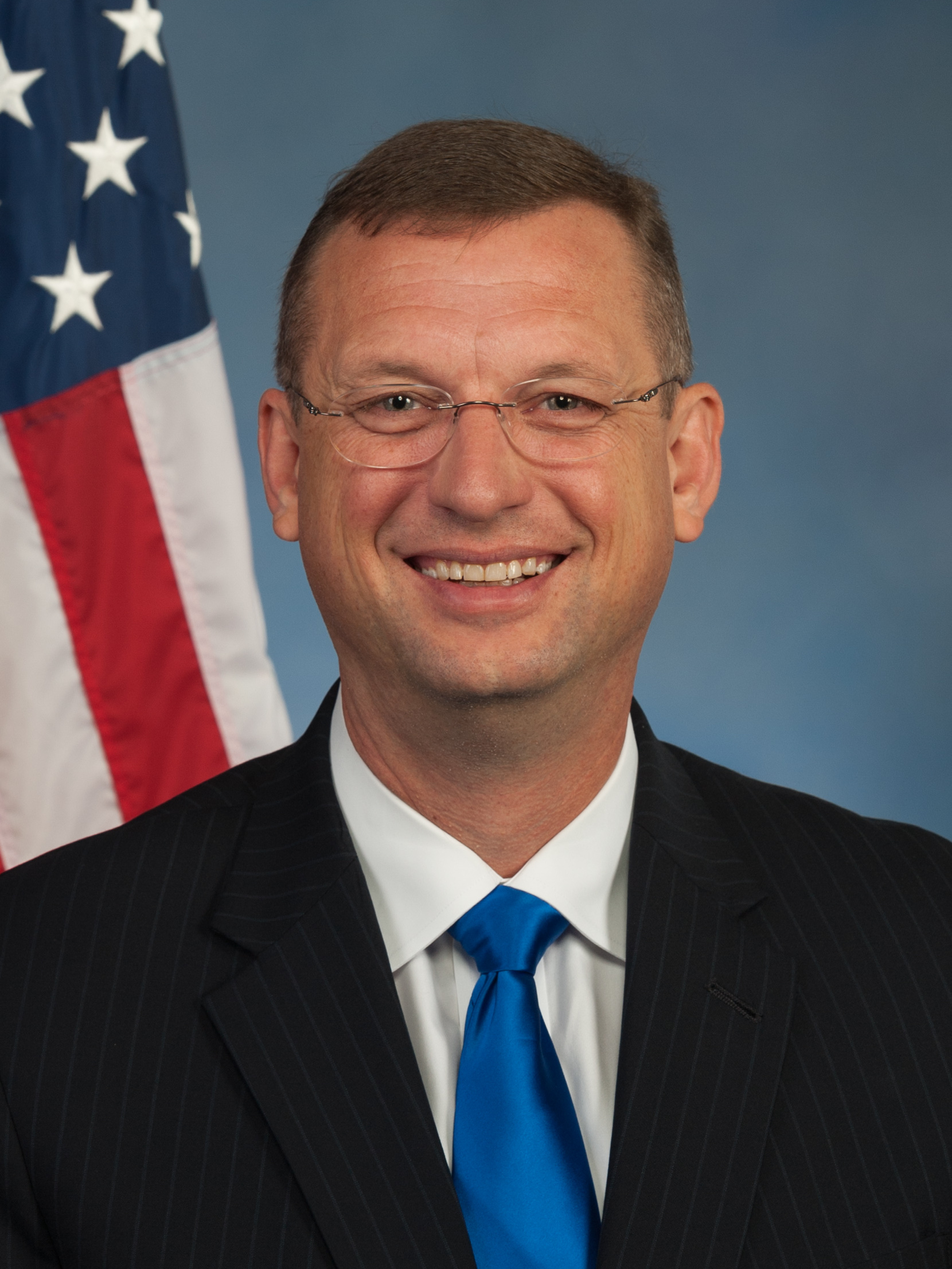

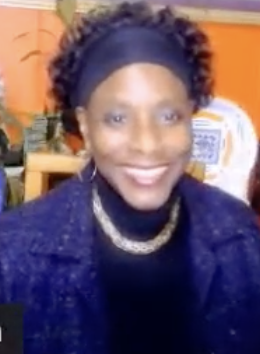
| Candidate | Raphael Warnock | Kelly Loeffler |
| Party | Democratic | Republican |
| First round | 1,617,035; 32.90% | 1,273,214; 25.91% |
| Runoff | 2,289,113; 51.04% | 2,195,841; 48.96% |
| Candidate | Doug Collins | Deborah Jackson |
| Party | Republican | Democratic |
| First round | 980,454; 19.95% | 324,118; 6.6% |
| Runoff | Eliminated | Eliminated |
- Warnock: 20–30% 30–40% 40–50% 50–60% 60–70% 70–80% 80–90% >90% Loeffler: 20–30% 30–40% 40–50% 50–60% 60–70% 70–80% 80–90% >90% Collins: 20–30% 30–40% 40–50% 50–60% 60–70% >90% Jackson: 30–40% 40–50% Tie: 20–30% 30–40% 40–50% 50% No data Warnock: 20–30% 30–40% 40–50% 50–60% 60–70% 70–80% 80–90% >90% Loeffler: 20–30% 30–40% 40–50% 50–60% 60–70% 70–80% 80–90% >90% Collins: 20–30% 30–40% 40–50% 50–60% 60–70% >90% Jackson: 30–40% 40–50% Tie: 20–30% 30–40% 40–50% 50% No data Warnock: 20–30% 30–40% 40–50% 50–60% 60–70% 70–80% 80–90% >90% Loeffler: 20–30% 30–40% 40–50% 50–60% 60–70% 70–80% 80–90% >90% Collins: 20–30% 30–40% 40–50% 50–60% 60–70% >90% Jackson: 30–40% 40–50% Tie: 20–30% 30–40% 40–50% 50% No data Warnock: 50–60% 60–70% 70–80% 80–90% >90% Loeffler: 50–60% 60–70% 70–80% 80–90% >90% Tie 50% No data Warnock: 50–60% 60–70% 70–80% 80–90% >90% Loeffler: 50–60% 60–70% 70–80% 80–90% >90% Tie 50% No data Warnock: 50–60% 60–70% 70–80% 80–90% >90% Loeffler: 50–60% 60–70% 70–80% 80–90% >90% Tie 50% No data
U.S. senator before election
Kelly Loeffler (Note: In January 2020, Loeffler was appointed by Governor Brian Kemp to fill the vacancy caused by the resignation of Senator Johnny Isakson, due to ill health.)
Republican
Elected U.S. Senator
Raphael Warnock
Democratic

The 2020–21 United States Senate special election in Georgia was held on November 3, 2020, and on January 5, 2021 (as a runoff), to elect the Class III member of the United States Senate to represent the State of Georgia. Democrat Raphael Warnock defeated appointed incumbent Republican Kelly Loeffler. The first round of the election was held on November 3, 2020; however, no candidate received a majority of the vote, so the top two candidates—Warnock and Loeffler—advanced to a runoff on January 5, 2021, which Warnock won narrowly.

The special election was prompted by the December 2019 resignation of Johnny Isakson. Georgia governor Brian Kemp appointed Loeffler as the interim replacement pending the special election.

Under Georgia law, no primary election took place for the special election; all candidates, regardless of party, were placed on the same ballot (known as a nonpartisan blanket primary, or "jungle primary"), and the election was held on November 3, 2020. Warnock received the most votes with 32.9%, and Loeffler came in second with 25.9%. No candidate received more than 50% of the vote, so the top two candidates advanced to a runoff election on January 5, 2021.

The runoff was held concurrently with the regular Georgia Class II Senate election, in which Democrat Jon Ossoff defeated incumbent Republican David Perdue, also in a runoff on January 5. Following the November 3, 2020 Senate elections, Republicans held 50 Senate seats, and the Democratic caucus—46 registered Democrats and two allied independents—had 48. Because of this, the two Georgia runoffs determined the balance of the United States Senate under the incoming Biden administration. Winning both races gave the Democratic caucus 50 Senate seats, an effective majority with Democratic vice president Kamala Harris casting tie-breaking votes. The extraordinarily high political stakes caused the races to attract significant attention nationwide and globally.

Major media outlets, including Decision Desk HQ, the Associated Press, The New York Times, and NBC News, called the election for Warnock in the early hours of January 6, just minutes after he declared victory. Though Loeffler vowed to challenge the results after she returned from the electoral vote certification in Washington, she conceded on January 7. Ossoff and Warnock became the first Democrats to be elected to the U.S. Senate from Georgia since Zell Miller in the 2000 special election. Warnock is the first Black senator from Georgia, as well as the first Black Democrat from the South elected to the Senate. Though Warnock is the first Democratic senator from this seat since the latter election, hours later Ossoff was declared the winner in the regular Senate election. The two elections mark the first time since the 1994 United States Senate election in Tennessee and the concurrent special election that both Senate seats in a state have flipped from one party to the other in a single election cycle. This was also the first time the Democrats achieved this since West Virginia's 1958 Senate elections. The election results were certified on January 19, 2021, with the senators-elect taking office on January 20, marking the first time since 2003 that Democrats held both of Georgia’s Senate seats and making them the first Democratic U.S. Senators from Georgia since 2005. Loeffler would later go on to serve as the Administrator of the Small Business Administration in 2025 during Donald Trump's second term in office.

== Background ==
On August 28, 2019, Isakson announced that he would resign from the Senate effective December 31, 2019, due to his deteriorating health. This triggered a special election to fill the remainder of his term. On September 17, 2019, Georgia governor Brian Kemp launched a website inviting Georgia citizens to submit their résumés to be considered for appointment. President Donald Trump advocated the appointment of Representative Doug Collins. Kemp appointed Loeffler to fill the seat until the 2020 special election; she took office on January 6, 2020.

== Candidates ==
=== Democratic Party ===
Despite the large number of candidates in the special election, by October 4, 2020, the Democratic Party had largely consolidated around Warnock's candidacy and had pressured other Democratic candidates, such as Matt Lieberman, to drop out to avoid vote-splitting.

While she had not been treated as a major contender and was largely ignored by pollsters, Deborah Jackson received 6.6% of the vote in the initial round of the election, being the second-best performing Democrat, and outperformed fellow Democrats such as Matt Lieberman and Ed Tarver, who pollsters had paid attention to. Al Jazeera attributed her performance, in part, to her being the first Democrat listed in the order of candidates that appeared on the ballot, and her being a familiar figure in the Democratic stronghold of DeKalb County.

==== Advanced to runoff ====
- Raphael Warnock, senior pastor of Ebenezer Baptist Church

==== Eliminated ====
- Deborah Jackson, attorney and former mayor of Lithonia
- Jamesia James, businesswoman and U.S. Air Force veteran
- Tamara Johnson-Shealey, businesswoman and frequent candidate
- Matt Lieberman, businessman, activist, and son of Joe Lieberman, former U.S. senator from Connecticut
- Joy Felicia Slade, physician
- Ed Tarver, former United States attorney for the Southern District of Georgia and former state senator
- Richard Dien Winfield, professor and candidate for Georgia's 10th congressional district in 2018

==== Declined ====
- Stacey Abrams, nominee for Governor of Georgia in 2018 and former minority leader of the Georgia House of Representatives (endorsed Warnock)
- Sherry Boston, DeKalb County District Attorney
- Jason Carter, nominee for Governor of Georgia in 2014, former state senator, and grandson of former U.S. president Jimmy Carter (endorsed Warnock)
- Stacey Evans, candidate for Governor of Georgia in 2018 and former state representative (ran for State House)
- Jen Jordan, state senator
- Lucy McBath, incumbent U.S. representative for Georgia's 6th congressional district (ran for re-election)
- Michelle Nunn, CEO of CARE USA and nominee for U.S. Senate in 2014; daughter of former senator Sam Nunn
- Jon Ossoff, documentary filmmaker and nominee for Georgia's 6th congressional district in 2017 (ran successfully in the regular Class 2 seat)
- Mike Thurmond, DeKalb County chief executive, former labor Ccmmissioner of Georgia, and nominee for U.S. Senate in 2010
- Teresa Tomlinson, former mayor of Columbus (ran in the regular Class 2 seat)
- Nikema Williams, state senator and chair of the Georgia Democratic Party (later ran for U.S. House)
- Sally Yates, former United States deputy attorney general

==== Endorsements ====
Matt Lieberman

U.S. senators

- Joe Lieberman, U.S. senator from Connecticut (1989–2013), Democratic nominee for Vice President in 2000, lawyer at Kasowitz Benson Torres (candidate's father) (Independent)

Individuals

- Hadassah Lieberman, author (candidate's stepmother)
Raphael Warnock

U.S. presidents

- Joe Biden, 46th President of the United States (2021–2025), 47th vice president of the United States (2009–2017), U.S. senator from Delaware (1973–2009)
- Jimmy Carter, 39th president of the United States (1977–1981), governor of Georgia (1971–1975)
- Barack Obama, 44th president of the United States (2009–2017), U.S. senator from Illinois (2005–2008)

U.S. vice presidents

- Kamala Harris, 49th Vice President of the United States (2021-2025), U.S. senator from California (2017–2021)

U.S. cabinet members

- Andrew Young, former mayor of Atlanta (1982–1990), former U.S. Ambassador to the United Nations (1977–1979), and U.S. representative for Georgia's 5th congressional district (1973–1977)

U.S. senators

- Tammy Baldwin, U.S. senator from Wisconsin
- Michael Bennet, U.S. senator from Colorado
- Cory Booker, U.S. senator from New Jersey
- Sherrod Brown, U.S. senator from Ohio
- Maria Cantwell, U.S. senator from Washington
- Bob Casey, U.S. senator from Pennsylvania
- Max Cleland, former U.S. senator from Georgia (1997–2003), former Georgia Secretary of State (1983–1996), and former Administrator of Veterans Affairs (1977–81)
- Chris Coons, U.S. senator from Delaware
- Catherine Cortez Masto, U.S. senator from Nevada
- Tammy Duckworth, U.S. senator from Illinois
- Dick Durbin, U.S. senator from Illinois
- Wyche Fowler, former U.S. senator from Georgia and former U.S. Ambassador to Saudi Arabia
- Kirsten Gillibrand, U.S. senator from New York
- Maggie Hassan, U.S. senator from New Hampshire
- Martin Heinrich, U.S. senator from New Mexico
- Tim Kaine, U.S. senator from Virginia
- Amy Klobuchar, U.S. senator from Minnesota
- Ed Markey, U.S. senator from Massachusetts
- Jeff Merkley, U.S. senator from Oregon
- Chris Murphy, U.S. senator from Connecticut
- Patty Murray, U.S. senator from Washington
- Jack Reed, U.S. senator from Rhode Island
- Bernie Sanders, U.S. senator from Vermont (Independent)
- Brian Schatz, U.S. senator from Hawaii
- Jeanne Shaheen, U.S. senator from New Hampshire
- Tina Smith, U.S. senator from Minnesota
- Debbie Stabenow, U.S. senator from Michigan
- Tom Udall, U.S. senator from New Mexico
- Mark Warner, U.S. senator from Virginia
- Elizabeth Warren, U.S. senator from Massachusetts
- Sheldon Whitehouse, U.S. senator from Rhode Island
- Ron Wyden, U.S. senator from Oregon

U.S. representatives

- Sanford Bishop, incumbent U.S. representative from Georgia's 2nd congressional district
- Jim Clyburn, incumbent U.S. representative from South Carolina's 6th congressional district and House Majority Whip
- Hank Johnson, incumbent U.S. representative for Georgia's 4th congressional district
- John Lewis, incumbent U.S. representative for Georgia's 5th congressional district (died July 17, 2020)
- Ayanna Pressley, incumbent U.S. representative from Massachusetts's 7th congressional district
- David Scott, incumbent U.S. representative from Georgia's 13th congressional district

State legislators

- Stacey Abrams, nominee for governor of Georgia in 2018 and former minority leader of the Georgia House of Representatives
- Erick Allen, state representative
- Debra Bazemore, state representative
- William Boddie, state representative and House Minority Whip
- Roger Bruce, state representative
- Park Cannon, state representative
- Jason Carter, nominee for governor of Georgia in 2014, former state senator, and grandson of former U.S. President Jimmy Carter
- Karla Drenner, state representative
- David Dreyer, state representative
- Becky Evans, state representative
- Stacey Evans, former state representative
- Pat Gardner, state representative
- Steve Henson, state senator and Senate minority leader
- El-Mahdi Holly, state representative
- Jen Jordan, state senator
- Pedro Marin, state representative
- Dewey McClain, state representative
- Donna McLeod, state representative
- Bee Nguyen, state representative
- Mary Margaret Oliver, state representative and former state senator
- Nan Orrock, state senator and former state representative
- Elena Parent, state senator
- Sam Park, state representative
- Renitta Shannon, state representative
- Horacena Tate, state senator
- Mable Thomas, state representative
- Bob Trammell, state representative and House minority leader

Local officials

- Marvin S. Arrington Sr., former president of the Atlanta City Council (1980–1997)
- Lisa Borders, former president of the Atlanta City Council (2004–2010)
- Felicia Moore, current president of the Atlanta City Council
- Cathy Woolard, former president of the Atlanta City Council (2002–2004)

Organizations

- Black Economic Alliance
- Brady PAC
- CBC PAC
- Center for Biological Diversity
- Climate Hawks Vote
- Democracy for America
- DSCC
- End Citizens United
- Everytown for Gun Safety
- Georgia AFL–CIO
- Jewish Democratic Council of America
- League of Conservation Voters
- Let America Vote
- NARAL
- National Education Association
- Natural Resources Defense Council Action Fund
- Planned Parenthood Action Fund
- Sierra Club
- United Auto Workers
- Working Families Party

Individuals

- Kareem Abdul-Jabbar, former basketball player
- Amy Acker, actress
- Patrick J. Adams, actor
- Jaylyn Agnew, professional basketball player for the Atlanta Dream of the Women's National Basketball Association (WNBA)
- Usman Ally, actor
- Ed Asner, actor
- Dan Bakkedahl, actor
- Troian Bellisario, actress
- Monique Billings, professional basketball player for the Atlanta Dream of the Women's National Basketball Association (WNBA)
- Sufe Bradshaw, actress
- Brittany Brewer, professional basketball player for the Atlanta Dream of the Women's National Basketball Association (WNBA)
- Kalani Brown, professional basketball player for the Atlanta Dream of the Women's National Basketball Association (WNBA)
- Chennedy Carter, professional basketball player for the Atlanta Dream of the Women's National Basketball Association (WNBA)
- Don Cheadle, actor
- Anna Chlumsky, actress
- Stephen Colbert, actor and comedian
- Gary Cole, actor
- David Costabile, actor
- Bryan Cranston, actor
- Denise Crosby, actress
- Zooey Deschanel, actress
- Blake Dietrick, professional basketball player for the Atlanta Dream of the Women's National Basketball Association (WNBA)
- Kevin Dunn, actor
- Clea DuVall, actress
- Billie Eilish, singer
- Beanie Feldstein, actress
- Will Ferrell, actor
- Nelson Franklin, actor
- Josh Gad, actor
- Tony Hale, actor
- Mark Hamill, actor
- Rachael Harris, actress
- Ed Helms, actor and comedian
- Taraji P. Henson, actress
- Rick Hoffman, actor
- Alexis Jones, professional basketball player for the Atlanta Dream of the Women's National Basketball Association (WNBA)
- Aaron Korsh, writer and producer
- Betnijah Laney, professional basketball player for the Atlanta Dream of the Women's National Basketball Association (WNBA)
- John Legend, singer and songwriter
- Lisa Ling, journalist and author
- John Lithgow, actor
- Eva Longoria, actress and activist
- Julia Louis-Dreyfus, actress
- Gabriel Macht, actor
- David Mandel, writer and director
- Dikembe Mutombo, humanitarian and former basketball player
- Kumail Nanjiani, actor
- Bob Newhart, actor
- Matt Oberg, actor
- Rory O'Malley, actor
- Jon Ossoff, Democratic nominee in the regular election and Democratic nominee in 2017 Georgia's 6th congressional district special election
- Patton Oswalt, actor and comedian
- Lennon Parham, actress
- David Pasquesi, actor
- Jordan Peele, actor, director and comedian
- Sarah Rafferty, actress
- Anthony Rapp, actor
- Sam Richardson, actor
- Andy Richter, actor and comedian
- Paul Scheer, actor
- Amanda Schull, actress
- Reid Scott, actor
- Amy Sedaris, actress
- Timothy Simons, actor
- Mary Steenburgen, actress
- Shekinna Stricklen, professional basketball player for the Atlanta Dream of the Women's National Basketball Association (WNBA)
- Sarah Sutherland, actress
- George Takei, actor and activist
- Max Topplin, actor
- Gina Torres, actress
- Matt Walsh, actor
- Kerry Washington, actress
- Courtney Williams, professional basketball player for the Atlanta Dream of the Women's National Basketball Association (WNBA)
- Elizabeth Williams, professional basketball player for the Atlanta Dream of the Women's National Basketball Association (WNBA)
- D. B. Woodside, actor
- Bowen Yang, actor and comedian

=== Republican Party ===
==== Advanced to runoff ====
- Kelly Loeffler, incumbent U.S. senator

==== Eliminated ====
- Doug Collins, U.S. representative for Georgia's 9th congressional district
- Derrick Grayson, minister, network engineer, software developer, perennial candidate, U.S. Navy veteran
- Annette Davis Jackson, businesswoman and candidate for Georgia State Senate in 2016
- Kandiss Taylor, student services coordinator for Appling County Board of Education

==== Withdrawn ====
- Wayne Johnson, former chief operating officer of the Office of Federal Student Aid (remained on ballot)
- Ervan Katari Miller, perennial candidate

==== Declined ====
- Nick Ayers, former chief of staff to Vice President Mike Pence
- Ashley Bell, regional administrator for the Small Business Administration
- Paul Broun, former U.S. representative from Georgia's 10th congressional district
- Buddy Carter, incumbent U.S. representative for Georgia's 1st congressional district
- Geoff Duncan, incumbent lieutenant governor of Georgia
- Stuart Frohlinger, finance expert
- Tom Graves, incumbent U.S. representative from Georgia's 14th congressional district
- Karen Handel, former U.S. representative from Georgia's 6th congressional district and former Georgia secretary of state (ran for U.S. House)
- Scott Hilton, former state representative (endorsed Loeffler)
- Jan Jones, Speaker pro tempore of the Georgia House of Representatives
- Brian Kemp, incumbent governor of Georgia (endorsed Loeffler)
- Butch Miller, state senator
- B. J. Pak, United States attorney for the Northern District of Georgia and former state representative
- Sonny Perdue, United States secretary of agriculture and former governor of Georgia
- Tom Price, former United States secretary of health and human services and former U.S. representative for Georgia's 6th congressional district

==== Endorsements ====
Kelly Loeffler

U.S. presidents

- Donald Trump, 45th president of the United States

U.S. vice presidents

- Mike Pence, 48th vice president of the United States

Federal officials

- Bob Barr, former U.S. representative from Georgia's 7th congressional district
- Marsha Blackburn, U.S. senator from Tennessee
- Tom Cotton, U.S. senator from Arkansas
- Joni Ernst, U.S. senator from Iowa
- Deb Fischer, U.S. senator from Nebraska
- Newt Gingrich, 2012 Republican presidential candidate and former House Speaker (1995-1999) and U.S. Representative from Georgia's 6th congressional district (1979-1999)
- Richard Grenell, former United States Ambassador to Germany
- Nikki Haley, former United States Ambassador to the United Nations
- Mitch McConnell, U.S. senator from Kentucky and Senate Majority Leader
- Tom Price, former United States Secretary of Health and Human Services
- Marco Rubio, U.S. senator from Florida
- Tim Scott, U.S. senator from South Carolina
- Elise Stefanik, incumbent U.S. representative from New York's 21st congressional district

State officials

- Mark Butler, Labor Commissioner of Georgia
- Chris Carr, state Attorney General
- Geoff Duncan, lieutenant governor and former state representative (2013-2017)
- Tim Echols, member of the Georgia Public Service Commission from the 2nd District
- Larry Hogan, Governor of Maryland (2015-2023)
- Brian Kemp, Governor and former state Secretary of State (2010-2018) and state senator (2003-2007)
- John King, Insurance Commissioner of Georgia
- Brad Raffensperger

Organizations

- Club for Growth PAC
- Family Policy Alliance of Georgia
- Georgia Life Alliance
- Maggie's List
- National Republican Senatorial Committee
- National Right to Life Committee
- Senate Leadership Fund
- Susan B. Anthony List Candidate Fund
- Winning for Women

Individuals

- Marjorie Taylor Greene, 2020 Republican nominee for Georgia's 14th congressional district
- Ivanka Trump, daughter of, and senior advisor to, U.S. President Donald Trump
- Herschel Walker, Heisman Trophy winner and former professional football player
Doug Collins

Federal officials

- Andy Biggs, incumbent U.S. representative from Arizona's 5th congressional district
- Drew Ferguson, incumbent U.S. representative from Georgia's 3rd congressional district
- Michael Flynn, former United States National Security Advisor
- Karen Handel, former U.S. representative from Georgia's 6th congressional district (2017-2019)
- Devin Nunes, incumbent U.S. representative from California's 22nd congressional district

State officials

- Gary Black, state Agriculture Commissioner
- Nathan Deal, Governor of Georgia (2011-2019)
- Mike Huckabee, 2008 and 2016 Republican presidential candidate and former governor of Arkansas (1996-2007)
- David Ralston, state representative and state House speaker

Local officials

- Rudy Giuliani, advisor to U.S. President Donald Trump, 2008 Republican presidential candidate, former mayor of New York (1994-2001), and Republican candidate in the 2000 U.S. Senate election in New York

Individuals

- Bernard Kerik, former New York City Police Commissioner.
- Roger Stone, political consultant

Organizations

- American Conservative Union (ACU) PAC
- GOPAC
- Great America PAC

=== Libertarian Party ===
==== Declared ====
- Brian Slowinski, Republican candidate for Georgia's 10th congressional district in 2014

=== Green Party ===
==== Declared ====
- John "Green" Fortuin

=== Independents ===
==== Declared ====
- Al Bartell, businessman, former Republican and Vietnam-era Air Force veteran
- Allen Buckley, attorney, accountant, Libertarian nominee for the U.S. Senate in 2004, 2008, 2016 and nominee for Lieutenant Governor of Georgia in 2006
- Michael Todd Greene
- Rod Mack (write-in candidate), member of the City of Hapeville Board of Appeals and candidate in the 2018 Georgia gubernatorial election
- Valencia Stovall, state representative

== Special election ==
=== Polling ===
==== Jungle primary ====
| Poll source | Date(s) administered | Sample size (Note: Key: A – all adults RV – registered voters LV – likely voters V – unclear) | Margin of error | Doug Collins (R) | Matt Lieberman (D) | Kelly Loeffler (R) | Ed Tarver (D) | Raphael Warnock (D) | Other | Undecided |
|---|---|---|---|---|---|---|---|---|---|---|
| Landmark Communications | November 1, 2020 | 500 (LV) | ± 4.4% | 24% | 5% | 27% | 1% | 38% | 1% (Note: Slowinski (L) with 1%) | 3% |
| Data for Progress | October 27 – November 1, 2020 | 1,036 (LV) | ± 3% | 21% | 8% | 26% | 3% | 41% | 1% (Note: "Other candidate or write-in" with 1%) | – |
| Emerson College | October 29–31, 2020 | 749 (LV) | ± 3.5% | 27% (Note: With voters who lean towards a given candidate) | 8% | 24% | 2% | 38% | 2% (Note: "Someone else" with 2%) | – |
| Landmark Communications | October 28, 2020 | 750 (LV) | ± 3.6% | 23% | 9% | 25% | 1% | 37% | 2% (Note: Slowinski (L) with 2%) | 3% |
| Public Policy Polling | October 27–28, 2020 | 661 (V) | – | 19% | 2% | 27% | 0% | 46% | 2% | 4% |
| Monmouth University | October 23–27, 2020 | 504 (RV) | ± 4.4% | 18% | 4% | 21% | 3% | 41% | 7% (Note: "Other candidate" with 4%; Slowinski (L) with 2%; "No one" with 1%) | 6% |
| Monmouth University | October 23–27, 2020 | 504 (LV) (Note: With a likely voter turnout model featuring higher turnout than in the 2016 presidential election) | ± 4.4% | 19% | – | 22% | – | 41% | – | – |
| Monmouth University | October 23–27, 2020 | 504 (LV) (Note: With a likely voter turnout model featuring lower turnout than in the 2016 presidential election) | ± 4.4% | 20% | – | 22% | – | 42% | – | – |
| Civiqs/Daily Kos | October 23–26, 2020 | 1,041 (LV) | ± 3.3% | 23% | 2% | 22% | 1% | 48% | 2% | 2% |
| University of Georgia | October 14–23, 2020 | 1,145 (LV) | ± 4% | 21% | 4% | 20% | 1% | 34% | 5% (Note: Slowinski (L) with 3%; "Other Candidate" with 2%) | 14% |
| Landmark Communications | October 21, 2020 | 500 (LV) | ± 4.4% | 27% | – | 24% | – | 33% | – | – |
| Citizen Data | October 17–20, 2020 | 1,000 (LV) | ± 3% | 19% | 4% | 23% | 1% | 41% | 3% | 10% |
| Emerson College | October 17–19, 2020 | 506 (LV) | ± 4.3% | 27% | 12% | 20% | 2% | 27% | 2% | 12% |
| Siena College/NYT Upshot | October 13–19, 2020 | 759 (LV) | ± 4.1% | 17% | 7% | 23% | 2% | 32% | 1% (Note: Would not vote with 1%) | 18% (Note: Includes "Refused") |
| Opinion Insight (R) (Note: The American Action Forum is a 501 organization which usually supports Republican candidates.) | October 12–15, 2020 | 801 (LV) | ± 3.46% | 18% | 3% | 19% | 1% | 31% | 14% (Note: Bartell (I), Did not vote, Johnson (R), Johnson-Shealey (D) and "Someone else" with 2%; Dien Winfield (D) with 1%) | 18% |
| Quinnipiac University | October 8–12, 2020 | 1,040 (LV) | ± 3.0% | 22% | 5% | 20% | 2% | 41% | 0% (Note: "Someone else" with 0%) | 9% |
| SurveyUSA | October 8–12, 2020 | 677 (LV) | ± 5.7% | 20% | 8% | 26% | 3% | 30% | 2% (Note: "Some other candidate" with 2%) | 12% |
| Data for Progress | October 8–11, 2020 | 782 (LV) | ± 3.5% | 22% | 10% | 22% | – | 30% | 17% (Note: Includes Undecided) | – |
| Public Policy Polling | October 8–9, 2020 | 528 (V) | ± 4.3% | 22% | 3% | 24% | 0% | 41% | 2% | 8% |
| Landmark Communications | October 7, 2020 | 600 (LV) | ± 4% | 23% | 3% | 26% | 0% | 36% | 4% (Note: Fortuin (G), Johnson-Shealey (D) and Taylor (R) with 1%; Bartell (I), Slade (D) and Stovall (I) with 0%; Buckley (I), Grayson (R), Greene (I), Jackson (R), James (D), Slowinski (L) and Winfield (D) with no voters) | 8% |
| University of Georgia | September 27 – October 6, 2020 | 1,106 (LV) | ± 2.9% | 21% | 3% | 22% | 4% | 28% | 3% (Note: Slowinski (L) with 2%; "Other candidate" with 1%) | 19% |
| Civiqs/Daily Kos | September 26–29, 2020 | 969 (LV) | ± 3.5% | 25% | 5% | 21% | 2% | 38% | 1% (Note: "Someone else" with 1%) | 7% |
| Hart Research Associates (D) (Note: The Human Rights Campaign endorsed Biden before this poll's sampling period) | September 24–27, 2020 | 400 (LV) | ± 4.9% | 21% | 8% (Note: Additional data sourced from FiveThirtyEight) | 28% | 3% | 28% | – | – |
| Quinnipiac University | September 23–27, 2020 | 1,125 (LV) | ± 2.9% | 22% | 9% | 23% | 4% | 31% | 0% | 12% |
| Redfield & Wilton Strategies | September 23–26, 2020 | 789 (LV) | ± 3.49% | 16% | 16% | 25% | – | 26% | 3% (Note: "Other Democratic Candidate" with 2%; "Third Party/Write-in" with 1%; "Other Republican Candidate" with 0%) | 14% |
| Monmouth University | September 17–21, 2020 | 402 (RV) | ± 4.9% | 22% | 11% | 23% | 4% | 21% | 6% (Note: "Other candidate" and Slowinski (L) with 3%; "No one" with 0%) | 13% |
| Monmouth University | September 17–21, 2020 | 402 (LV) | ± 4.9% | 23% | 11% | 23% | 3% | 23% | 5% (Note: Slowinski (L) with 3%; "Other" with 2%) | 12% |
| Monmouth University | September 17–21, 2020 | 402 (LV) | ± 4.9% | 24% | 9% | 23% | 2% | 25% | 4% (Note: Slowinski (L) and "Other" with 2%) | 12% |
| Siena College/NYT Upshot | September 16–21, 2020 | 523 (LV) | ± 4.9% | 19% | 7% | 23% | 4% | 19% | 1% | 27% |
| University of Georgia | September 11–20, 2020 | 1,150 (LV) | ± 4.0% | 21% | 11% | 24% | 5% | 20% | 4% (Note: Slowinski (L) with 3%; "Other candidate" with 1%) | 16% |
| Data For Progress (D) | September 14–19, 2020 | 800 (LV) | ± 3.5% | 22% | 14% | 21% | – | 26% | – | 17% |
| Redfield & Wilton Strategies | September 12–17, 2020 | 800 (LV) | ± 3.46% | 19% | 15% | 26% | – | 21% | 5% (Note: "Other Democratic Candidate" with 3%; "Another Third Party/Write-in" and "Other Republican Candidate" with 1%) | 15% |
| GBAO Strategies (D) (Note: Poll sponsored by Warnock's campaign.) | September 14–16, 2020 | 600 (LV) | ± 4% | 19% | 11% | 29% | 5% | 25% | – | – |
| Fabrizio Ward/Hart Research Associates (Note: Poll sponsored by AARP.) | August 30 – September 5, 2020 | 800 (LV) | ± 3.5% | 20% | 10% | 24% | 7% | 19% | 1% (Note: Would not vote with 1%; "Other candidate" with 0%) | 19% |
| Opinion Insight (R) | August 30 – September 2, 2020 | 800 (LV) | ± 3.46% | 20% | 4% | 17% | 1% | 17% | 13% (Note: Johnson-Shealey (D) with 5%; Bartell (I), Dien Winfield (D) and Johnson (R) with 2%; "One of the other candidates" and would not vote with 1%) | 27% |
| HarrisX (D) (Note: Poll sponsored by Matt Lieberman's campaign) | August 20–30, 2020 | 1,616 (RV) | ± 2.4% | 21% | 13% | 26% | 7% | 16% | 18% (Note: Slowinski (L) with 5%; Johnson (R) and would not vote with 4%; "Another candidate/still undecided" with 3%; Winfield (D) with 2%) | – |
| SurveyUSA | August 6–8, 2020 | 623 (LV) | ± 5.3% | 17% | 13% | 26% | 3% | 17% | 2% | 21% |
| HIT Strategies (D) (Note: This poll's sponsor, DFER, primarily supports Democratic candidates) | July 23–31, 2020 | 400 (RV) | ± 4.9% | 18% | 14% | 22% | 6% | 14% | 1% (Note: "TThird-partycandidate" with 1%) | 23% |
| Monmouth University | July 23–27, 2020 | 402 (RV) | ± 4.9% | 20% | 14% | 26% | 5% | 9% | 8% (Note: "Other candidate" with 5%; Slowinski (L) with 3%) | 18% |
| Monmouth University | July 23–27, 2020 | 402 (LV) | ± 4.9% | 21% | 14% | 26% | 5% | 10% | 6% (Note: "Other" with 4%; Slowinski (L) with 2%) | 17% |
| Monmouth University | July 23–27, 2020 | 402 (LV) | ± 4.9% | 22% | 13% | 26% | 4% | 10% | 6% | 19% |
| Spry Strategies (R) (Note: This poll's sponsor is the American Principles Project, a 501 that supports the Republican Party.) | July 11–16, 2020 | 700 (LV) | ± 3.7% | 20% | 23% | 19% | 9% | – | – | 20% |
| GBAO Strategies (D) | July 6–9, 2020 | 600 (LV) | – | 26% | 19% | 21% | 9% | 16% | – | – |
| Battleground Connect (R) (Note: Internal poll for Collins) | July 6–8, 2020 | 600 (LV) | ± 4% | 26% | 15% | 17% | 5% | 10% | 2% | 26% |
| Gravis Marketing (R) (Note: Poll is sponsored by OANN, a far-right television news channel.) | July 2, 2020 | 513 (LV) | ± 4.3% | 26% | 11% | 24% | 9% | 18% | – | 12% |
| Public Policy Polling (D) (Note: This poll is sponsored by End Citizens United, a PAC which has endorsed Democratic candidates who are against the landmark Citizens United court ruling.) | June 25–26, 2020 | 734 (RV) | ± 3.6% | 23% | 11% | 21% | 3% | 20% | – | 22% |
| MRG (D) (Note: Steve Phillips, who sponsored this poll, is a senior fellow at the Democratic-leaning Center for American Progress) | June 18–23, 2020 | 1,259 (LV) | – | 27% | 13% | 21% | – | 23% | 5% (Note: "Other" with 3%; would not vote with 2%) | 12% |
| Civiqs/Daily Kos | May 16–18, 2020 | 1,339 (RV) | ± 3.1% | 34% | 14% | 12% | 6% | 18% | 4% (Note: "Someone else" with 4%) | 12% |
| Public Opinion Strategies (R) | May 4–7, 2020 | 500 (LV) | ± 4.38% | 19% | 17% | 18% | – | 9% | 11% (Note: All other candidates with 5% or less) | 26% |
| Cygnal (R) (Note: Poll conducted for the Speaker of Georgia's House Republican caucus) | April 25–27, 2020 | 591 (LV) | ± 4.0% | 29% | 12% | 11% | 4% | 11% | 2% (Note: "Another candidate who qualified to run but isn't listed" with 2%) | 31% |
| Battleground Connect (R) | March 31 – April 1, 2020 | 1,035 (LV) | ± 3.01% | 36% | 11% | 13% | 3% | 16% | 4% (Note: Bartell (I) with 2%; Slowinski (L) and "someone else" with 1%) | 17% |
| Battleground Connect (R) | March 24, 2020 | 1,025 (LV) | – | 34% | 18% | 14% | 5% | 13% | – | 15% |
| Battleground Connect (R) | March 21, 2020 | 1,025 (LV) | – | 32% | 19% | 15% | 5% | 12% | – | 18% |
| Battleground Connect (R) | March 12, 2020 | 1,025 (LV) | – | 30% | 18% | 19% | 5% | 10% | – | 18% |
| Battleground Connect (R) | March 7, 2020 | 1,025 (LV) | – | 29% | 16% | 20% | 5% | 12% | – | 18% |
| University of Georgia | February 24 – March 2, 2020 | 1,117 (LV) | ± 2.9% | 21% | 11% | 19% | 4% | 6% | 8% (Note: Johnson (R) with 4%; Winfield (D) with 3%; Bartell (I) with 2%; "refused" with 0%) | 31% |
| Battleground Connect (R) | February 26–27, 2020 | 1,050 (LV) | ± 3.0% | 28% | 5% | 20% | 3% | 13% | – | 31% |
| Public Opinion Strategies (R) (Note: Internal poll for Loeffler) | February 17–20, 2020 | 600 (LV) | ± 4.0% | 19% | 18% | 20% | – (Note: Democratic candidates have 31% of the vote combined) | – | 7% (Note: Bartell with 5%; Johnson (R) with 2%) | 21% |
| McLaughlin & Associates (R) | December 16–18, 2019 | 600 (LV) | – | 32% | 42% | 11% | – | — | — | 16% |

=== Predictions ===
| Source | Ranking | As of |
|---|---|---|
| The Cook Political Report | Tossup | October 29, 2020 |
| Inside Elections | Tilt R | October 28, 2020 |
| Sabato's Crystal Ball | Tossup | November 2, 2020 |
| Daily Kos | Tossup | October 30, 2020 |
| Politico | Lean R | November 2, 2020 |
| RCP | Lean R | October 23, 2020 |
| DDHQ | Tossup | November 3, 2020 |
| FiveThirtyEight | Lean D (flip) | November 2, 2020 |
| Economist | Tossup | November 2, 2020 |

=== Results ===
Since no candidate won a majority of the vote on November 3, the top two finishers—Loeffler and Warnock—advanced to a January 5, 2021 runoff election.

2020–21 United States Senate special election in Georgia
| Party | Candidate | Votes | % |
|---|---|---|---|
| Democratic | Raphael Warnock | 1,617,035 | 32.90% |
| Republican | Kelly Loeffler (incumbent) | 1,273,214 | 25.91% |
| Republican | Doug Collins | 980,454 | 19.95% |
| Democratic | Deborah Jackson | 324,118 | 6.60% |
| Democratic | Matt Lieberman | 136,021 | 2.77% |
| Democratic | Tamara Johnson-Shealey | 106,767 | 2.17% |
| Democratic | Jamesia James | 94,406 | 1.92% |
| Republican | Derrick Grayson | 51,592 | 1.05% |
| Democratic | Joy Felicia Slade | 44,945 | 0.91% |
| Republican | Annette Davis Jackson | 44,335 | 0.90% |
| Republican | Kandiss Taylor | 40,349 | 0.82% |
| Republican | Wayne Johnson (withdrawn) | 36,176 | 0.74% |
| Libertarian | Brian Slowinski | 35,431 | 0.72% |
| Democratic | Richard Dien Winfield | 28,687 | 0.58% |
| Democratic | Ed Tarver | 26,333 | 0.54% |
| Independent | Allen Buckley | 17,954 | 0.37% |
| Green | John Fortuin | 15,293 | 0.31% |
| Independent | Al Bartell | 14,640 | 0.30% |
| Independent | Valencia Stovall | 13,318 | 0.27% |
| Independent | Michael Todd Greene | 13,293 | 0.27% |
| Total votes | | 4,914,361 | 100.00% |

==== By county ====
| County | Raphael Warnock Democratic | | Kelly Loeffler Republican | | Doug Collins Republican | | Various candidates Other parties | | Margin | | Total votes cast |
| County | # | % | # | % | # | % | # | % | # | % | Total votes cast |
|---|---|---|---|---|---|---|---|---|---|---|---|
| Appling | 1,051 | 12.88% | 1,807 | 22.15% | 2,355 | 28.86% | 2,946 | 36.11% | -1,304 | -15.98% | 8,159 |
| Atkinson | 406 | 13.56% | 946 | 31.59% | 1,038 | 34.66% | 605 | 20.20% | -632 | -21.10% | 2,995 |
| Bacon | 315 | 6.98% | 1,547 | 34.29% | 1,646 | 36.48% | 1,004 | 22.25% | -1,331 | -39.50% | 4,512 |
| Baker | 457 | 30.18% | 413 | 27.28% | 388 | 25.63% | 256 | 16.91% | 44 | 2.91% | 1,514 |
| Baldwin | 6,167 | 34.48% | 4,639 | 25.94% | 3,521 | 19.69% | 3,558 | 19.89% | 1,528 | 8.54% | 17,885 |
| Banks | 604 | 6.96% | 2,605 | 30.02% | 4,710 | 54.27% | 760 | 8.76% | -2,105 | -47.31% | 8,679 |
| Barrow | 8,458 | 16.20% | 14,483 | 38.94% | 9,671 | 26.00% | 7,011 | 18.85% | -4,812 | -22.74% | 37,190 |
| Bartow | 7,655 | 15.43% | 21,183 | 42.69% | 12,891 | 25.98% | 7,890 | 15.90% | -5,236 | -10.55% | 49,619 |
| Ben Hill | 1,308 | 20.30% | 1,780 | 27.62% | 1,880 | 29.17% | 1,476 | 22.91% | -572 | -8.88% | 6,444 |
| Berrien | 701 | 9.27% | 3,318 | 43.86% | 2,481 | 32.80% | 1,065 | 14.08% | -2,617 | -34.59% | 7,565 |
| Bibb | 30,896 | 44.18% | 14,584 | 20.85% | 10,194 | 14.58% | 14,266 | 20.40% | 16,312 | 23.32% | 69,940 |
| Bleckley | 876 | 15.61% | 2,133 | 38.00% | 1,927 | 34.33% | 677 | 12.06% | -1,257 | -22.39% | 5,613 |
| Brantley | 236 | 3.19% | 2,410 | 32.62% | 3,128 | 42.34% | 1,614 | 21.85% | -2,892 | -39.14% | 7,388 |
| Brooks | 1,024 | 14.98% | 1,953 | 28.57% | 1,750 | 25.60% | 2,108 | 30.84% | -929 | -13.59% | 6,835 |
| Bryan | 3,941 | 18.87% | 7,950 | 38.06% | 4,775 | 22.86% | 4,522 | 20.21% | -4,009 | -19.19% | 20,888 |
| Bulloch | 6,665 | 22.52% | 8,944 | 30.22% | 7,854 | 26.53% | 6,136 | 20.73% | -2,279 | -7.70% | 29,599 |
| Burke | 3,158 | 30.18% | 3,018 | 28.84% | 1,916 | 18.31% | 2,373 | 22.68% | 140 | 1.34% | 10,465 |
| Butts | 2,207 | 19.01% | 4,541 | 39.12% | 3,191 | 27.49% | 1,670 | 14.39% | -2,334 | -20.11% | 11,609 |
| Calhoun | 819 | 38.09% | 510 | 23.72% | 359 | 16.70% | 462 | 21.49% | 140 | 14.37% | 2,150 |
| Camden | 2,967 | 13.12% | 6,631 | 29.32% | 5,913 | 26.14% | 7,106 | 31.42% | -7,520 | -33.25% | 22,617 |
| Candler | 778 | 18.00% | 1,555 | 35.98% | 1,251 | 28.94% | 738 | 17.08% | -777 | -17.98% | 4,322 |
| Carroll | 10,688 | 19.91% | 20,167 | 37.56% | 14,221 | 26.49% | 8,611 | 16.04% | -9,479 | -17.66% | 53,687 |
| Catoosa | 6,599 | 18.38% | 13,577 | 37.82% | 8,238 | 22.95% | 7,484 | 20.85% | -6,978 | -19.44% | 35,898 |
| Charlton | 334 | 7.73% | 1,095 | 25.33% | 1,621 | 37.50% | 1,621 | 29.45% | -761 | -17.60% | 4,323 |
| Chatham | 54,637 | 41.59% | 30,435 | 23.17% | 18,455 | 14.05% | 27,842 | 21.19% | 24,202 | 18.42% | 131,369 |
| Chattahoochee | 410 | 26.73% | 388 | 25.29% | 372 | 24.25% | 364 | 23.73% | 22 | 1.43% | 1,534 |
| Chattooga | 1,129 | 11.64% | 3,858 | 39.76% | 2,883 | 29.71% | 1,833 | 18.89% | -2,729 | -28.13% | 9,703 |
| Cherokee | 27,461 | 19.31% | 57,372 | 40.33% | 34,874 | 24.52% | 22,533 | 15.84% | -29,911 | -21.03% | 142,240 |
| Clarke | 24,636 | 48.58% | 8,050 | 15.87% | 5,807 | 11.45% | 12,221 | 24.10% | 16,586 | 32.70% | 50,714 |
| Clay | 474 | 33.64% | 305 | 21.65% | 259 | 18.38% | 371 | 26.33% | 169 | 11.99% | 1,409 |
| Clayton | 65,681 | 59.00% | 7,087 | 6.37% | 5,361 | 4.82% | 33,187 | 29.81% | 58,594 | 52.64% | 111,316 |
| Clinch | 239 | 8.85% | 1,066 | 39.48% | 742 | 27.48% | 653 | 24.19% | -827 | -30.63% | 2,700 |
| Cobb | 146,081 | 37.56% | 98,534 | 25.33% | 57,863 | 14.88% | 86,488 | 22.24% | 47,547 | 12.22% | 388,966 |
| Coffee | 2,455 | 16.68% | 4,324 | 29.37% | 4,853 | 32.96% | 3,090 | 20.99% | -2,398 | -16.29% | 14,722 |
| Colquitt | 2,531 | 16.04% | 6,562 | 41.58% | 4,336 | 27.47% | 2,353 | 14.91% | -4,031 | -25.54% | 15,782 |
| Columbia | 16,245 | 20.46% | 28,606 | 36.03% | 18,299 | 23.05% | 16,255 | 20.47% | -12,361 | -15.57% | 79,405 |
| Cook | 1,085 | 15.71% | 2,703 | 39.13% | -l1,762 | 25.51% | 1,357 | 19.65% | -1,618 | -23.43% | 6,907 |
| Coweta | 16,593 | 21.94% | 28,927 | 38.24% | 18,824 | 24.89% | 11,298 | 14.94% | -12,334 | -16.31% | 75,642 |
| Crawford | 1,172 | 19.54% | 2,281 | 38.03% | 1,771 | 29.53% | 774 | 12.90% | -1,109 | -18.49% | 5,998 |
| Crisp | 1,738 | 22.04% | 2,330 | 29.55% | 2,316 | 29.37% | 1,501 | 19.04% | -592 | -7.51% | 7,885 |
| Dade | 461 | 6.44% | 3,088 | 43.15% | 2,063 | 28.82% | 1,545 | 21.59% | -2,627 | -36.71% | 7,157 |
| Dawson | 1,506 | 9.48% | 5,260 | 33.13% | 7,345 | 46.26% | 1,768 | 11.13% | -5,839 | -36.77% | 15,879 |
| Decatur | 1,738 | 15.35% | 2,980 | 26.33% | 2,991 | 26.42% | 3,610 | 31.89% | -1,242 | -10.97% | 11,319 |
| DeKalb | 226,498 | 61.69% | 34,426 | 9.38% | 20,248 | 5.51% | 85,961 | 23.41% | 192,072 | 52.32% | 367,133 |
| Dodge | 1,421 | 18.31% | 2,897 | 37.33% | 2,467 | 31.79% | 975 | 12.56% | -1,476 | -19.02% | 7,760 |
| Dooly | 1,188 | 29.66% | 1,041 | 25.99% | 968 | 24.17% | 808 | 20.17% | 147 | 3.67% | 4,005 |
| Dougherty | 17,214 | 49.36% | 5,620 | 16.11% | 4,129 | 11.84% | 7,913 | 22.69% | 11,594 | 33.24% | 34,876 |
| Douglas | 29,454 | 43.04% | 14,011 | 20.47% | 9,146 | 13.36% | 15,830 | 23.13% | 15,443 | 22.56% | 68,441 |
| Early | 1,005 | 20.23% | 1,133 | 22.80% | 1,314 | 26.44% | 1,517 | 30.53% | -309 | -6.22% | 4,969 |
| Echols | 36 | 2.61% | 558 | 40.41% | 508 | 36.78% | 279 | 20.20% | -447 | -32.37% | 1,381 |
| Effingham | 4,943 | 15.96% | 12,742 | 41.14% | 8,019 | 25.89% | 5,270 | 17.01% | -7,799 | -25.18% | 30,974 |
| Elbert | 1,237 | 14.35% | 1,526 | 17.70% | 4,223 | 48.98% | 1,636 | 18.97% | -2,986 | -34.63% | 8,622 |
| Emanuel | 1,692 | 18.41% | 3,061 | 33.30% | 2,776 | 30.20% | 1,662 | 18.08% | -1,369 | -14.89% | 9,191 |
| Evans | 791 | 19.07% | 1,503 | 36.24% | 1,099 | 26.50% | 754 | 18.18% | -172 | -17.17% | 4,147 |
| Fannin | 1,694 | 11.63% | 3,877 | 26.61% | 7,542 | 51.76% | 1,458 | 10.01% | -5,848 | -40.13% | 14,571 |
| Fayette | 22,840 | 32.20% | 21,759 | 30.67% | 13,916 | 19.62% | 12,427 | 17.52% | 1,081 | 1.52% | 70,942 |
| Floyd | 8,151 | 19.91% | 15,417 | 37.67% | 11,097 | 27.11% | 6,265 | 15.31% | -7,266 | -17.75% | 40,930 |
| Forsyth | 23,895 | 18.82% | 44,383 | 34.95% | 35,067 | 27.61% | 23,655 | 18.63% | -20,488 | -16.13% | 127,000 |
| Franklin | 613 | 5.79% | 2,258 | 21.33% | 6,158 | 58.17% | 1,557 | 14.71% | -1,645 | -15.54% | 10,586 |
| Fulton | 263,365 | 50.88% | 83,536 | 16.14% | 48,437 | 9.36% | 122,269 | 23.62% | 179,829 | 34.74% | 517,607 |
| Gilmer | 1,897 | 11.71% | 7,711 | 47.60% | 4,908 | 30.29% | 1,685 | 10.40% | -5,814 | -35.89% | 16,201 |
| Glascock | 84 | 5.60% | 819 | 54.60% | 436 | 29.07% | 161 | 10.73% | -735 | -49.00% | 1,500 |
| Glynn | 7,272 | 17.84% | 11,810 | 28.97% | 10,293 | 25.24% | 11,393 | 27.95% | -4,538 | -11.13% | 40,768 |
| Gordon | 2,619 | 11.16% | 9,539 | 40.64% | 7,586 | 32.32% | 3,726 | 15.88% | -6,920 | -29.48% | 23,470 |
| Grady | 1,406 | 13.52% | 2,719 | 26.14% | 3,475 | 33.41% | 2,800 | 26.92% | -2,069 | -19.89% | 10,400 |
| Greene | 2,572 | 23.12% | 3,349 | 30.11% | 3,608 | 32.44% | 1,594 | 14.33% | -1,036 | -9.31% | 11,123 |
| Gwinnett | 142,968 | 35.50% | 88,613 | 22.00% | 57,886 | 14.37% | 113,248 | 28.12% | 54,355 | 13.50% | 402,715 |
| Habersham | 2,133 | 10.60% | 5,371 | 26.69% | 10,319 | 51.28% | 2,299 | 11.43% | -8,186 | -40.68% | 20,122 |
| Hall | 14,889 | 16.64% | 21,965 | 24.54% | 39,470 | 44.10% | 13,171 | 14.72% | -24,581 | -27.47% | 89,495 |
| Hancock | 2,129 | 52.07% | 608 | 14.87% | 476 | 11.64% | 876 | 21.42% | 1,521 | 37.20% | 4,089 |
| Haralson | 1,200 | 8.59% | 6,533 | 46.76% | 4,488 | 32.13% | 1,749 | 12.52% | -5,333 | -38.17% | 13,970 |
| Harris | 3,776 | 19.12% | 7,090 | 35.90% | 6,438 | 32.60% | 2,446 | 12.38% | -3,314 | -16.78% | 19,750 |
| Hart | 1,302 | 10.54% | 6,665 | 53.95% | 2,080 | 16.84% | 2,307 | 18.67% | -5,363 | -43.41% | 12,354 |
| Heard | 592 | 11.28% | 2,542 | 48.45% | 1,515 | 28.87% | 598 | 11.40% | -1,950 | -37.16% | 5,247 |
| Henry | 49,407 | 40.67% | 26,824 | 22.08% | 16,836 | 13.86% | 28,403 | 23.38% | 22,583 | 18.59% | 121,470 |
| Houston | 21,945 | 29.71% | 22,327 | 30.23% | 16,037 | 21.71% | 13,554 | 18.35% | -382 | -0.52% | 73,863 |
| Irwin | 606 | 14.80% | 1,459 | 35.64% | 1,435 | 35.05% | 594 | 14.51% | -853 | -20.84% | 4,094 |
| Jackson | 4,783 | 12.87% | 12,593 | 33.89% | 14,914 | 40.14% | 4,866 | 13.10% | -10,131 | -27.27% | 37,156 |
| Jasper | 1,218 | 16.16% | 3,246 | 43.07% | 2,142 | 28.42% | 931 | 12.35% | -2,028 | -26.91% | 7,537 |
| Jeff Davis | 590 | 10.54% | 1,719 | 30.72% | 1,774 | 31.70% | 1,513 | 27.04% | -1,184 | -21.16% | 5,596 |
| Jefferson | 2,487 | 33.33% | 1,847 | 24.75% | 1,429 | 19.15% | 1,699 | 22.77% | 640 | 8.58% | 7,462 |
| Jenkins | 806 | 23.95% | 1,104 | 32.80% | 849 | 25.22% | 607 | 18.03% | -298 | -8.85% | 3,366 |
| Johnson | 763 | 19.25% | 1,376 | 34.71% | 1,243 | 31.36% | 582 | 14.68% | -613 | -15.46% | 3,964 |
| Jones | 3,496 | 23.71% | 5,397 | 36.60% | 3,809 | 25.83% | 2,044 | 13.86% | -1,901 | -12.89% | 14,746 |
| Lamar | 1,994 | 22.32% | 3,243 | 36.30% | 2,585 | 28.93% | 1,112 | 12.45% | -1,249 | -13.98% | 8,934 |
| Lanier | 365 | 10.64% | 1,191 | 34.70% | 944 | 27.51% | 932 | 27.16% | -826 | -24.07% | 3,432 |
| Laurens | 5,334 | 23.89% | 6,592 | 29.53% | 6,762 | 30.29% | 3,637 | 16.29% | -1,428 | -6.40% | 22,325 |
| Lee | 2,970 | 18.06% | 6,365 | 38.70% | 4,675 | 28.42% | 2,437 | 14.82% | -3,395 | -20.64% | 16,447 |
| Liberty | 7,723 | 36.86% | 3,759 | 17.94% | 2,939 | 14.03% | 6,532 | 31.17% | 3,964 | 18.92% | 20,953 |
| Lincoln | 803 | 17.60% | 1,725 | 37.80% | 1,246 | 27.31% | 789 | 17.29% | -922 | -20.21% | 4,563 |
| Long | 1,233 | 22.31% | 1,708 | 30.90% | 1,250 | 22.62% | 1,336 | 24.17% | -475 | -8.59% | 5,527 |
| Lowndes | 7,931 | 17.57% | 12,607 | 27.93% | 10,085 | 22.34% | 14,522 | 32.17% | -4,676 | -20.21% | 45,145 |
| Lumpkin | 2,042 | 13.34% | 7,074 | 46.20% | 4,366 | 28.51% | 1,830 | 11.95% | -5,032 | -32.86% | 15,312 |
| Macon | 1,987 | 43.60% | 823 | 18.06% | 810 | 17.77% | 937 | 20.56% | 1,164 | 25.54% | 4,557 |
| Madison | 2,284 | 15.55% | 5,756 | 39.20% | 4,808 | 32.74% | 1,836 | 12.50% | -3,472 | -23.64% | 14,684 |
| Marion | 849 | 23.94% | 1,078 | 30.40% | 986 | 27.81% | 633 | 17.85% | -229 | -6.46% | 3,546 |
| McDuffie | 2,387 | 23.17% | 3,503 | 34.00% | 2,260 | 21.94% | 2,152 | 20.89% | -1,116 | -10.83% | 10,302 |
| McIntosh | 1,545 | 23.80% | 2,117 | 32.61% | 1,494 | 23.01% | 1,336 | 20.58% | -572 | -8.81% | 6,492 |
| Meriwether | 3,018 | 28.19% | 3,255 | 30.40% | 2,664 | 24.88% | 1,770 | 16.53% | -237 | -2.21% | 10,707 |
| Miller | 271 | 10.25% | 881 | 33.33% | 883 | 33.41% | 608 | 23.00% | -612 | -23.16% | 2,781 |
| Mitchell | 2,598 | 29.50% | 2,090 | 23.73% | 2,538 | 28.82% | 1,580 | 17.94% | 60 | 0.68% | 8,806 |
| Monroe | 3,197 | 20.83% | 6,077 | 39.60% | 4,201 | 27.38% | 1,870 | 12.19% | -2,880 | -18.77% | 15,345 |
| Montgomery | 582 | 15.16% | 1,332 | 34.71% | 1,266 | 32.99% | 658 | 17.14% | -750 | -19.54% | 3,838 |
| Morgan | 2,392 | 20.67% | 4,360 | 37.68% | 3,502 | 30.27% | 1,316 | 11.37% | -1,968 | -17.01% | 11,570 |
| Murray | 765 | 5.16% | 6,300 | 42.50% | 4,793 | 32.33% | 2,965 | 20.00% | -5,535 | -37.34% | 14,823 |
| Muscogee | 32,560 | 41.03% | 15,307 | 19.29% | 12,544 | 15.81% | 18,937 | 23.87% | 17,253 | 21.74% | 79,550 |
| Newton | 20,450 | 38.17% | 13,443 | 25.09% | 8,222 | 15.35% | 11,457 | 21.39% | 7,007 | 13.08% | 53,572 |
| Oconee | 5,448 | 21.87% | 9,914 | 39.80% | 6,165 | 24.75% | 3,382 | 13.58% | -4,466 | -17.93% | 25,142 |
| Oglethorpe | 1,720 | 21.58% | 2,901 | 36.40% | 2,176 | 27.30% | 1,173 | 14.72% | -1,181 | -14.82% | 7,970 |
| Paulding | 19,118 | 22.76% | 30,597 | 36.43% | 18,444 | 21.96% | 15,827 | 18.84% | -11,479 | -13.67% | 83,986 |
| Peach | 4,032 | 32.64% | 3,358 | 27.19% | 2,629 | 21.28% | 2,333 | 18.89% | 674 | 5.46% | 12,352 |
| Pickens | 2,076 | 12.33% | 6,003 | 35.66% | 7,185 | 42.68% | 1,572 | 9.34% | -5,109 | -30.35% | 16,836 |
| Pierce | 478 | 5.44% | 2,821 | 32.11% | 4,034 | 45.91% | 1,453 | 16.54% | -3,556 | -40.47% | 8,786 |
| Pike | 1,118 | 10.57% | 4,965 | 46.94% | 3,532 | 33.39% | 963 | 9.10% | -3,847 | -36.37% | 10,578 |
| Polk | 2,331 | 13.68% | 6,942 | 40.75% | 5,230 | 30.70% | 2,532 | 14.86% | -4,611 | -27.07% | 17,035 |
| Pulaski | 815 | 20.49% | 1,480 | 37.20% | 1,137 | 28.58% | 546 | 13.72% | -665 | -16.72% | 3,978 |
| Putnam | 2,445 | 20.89% | 4,208 | 35.95% | 3,594 | 30.70% | 1,459 | 12.46% | -1,763 | -15.06% | 11,706 |
| Quitman | 283 | 26.30% | 285 | 26.49% | 262 | 24.35% | 246 | 22.86% | -2 | -0.19% | 1,076 |
| Rabun | 1,223 | 13.03% | 2,475 | 26.37% | 4,576 | 48.75% | 1,112 | 11.85% | -3,353 | -35.72% | 9,386 |
| Randolph | 1,179 | 39.01% | 706 | 23.36% | 580 | 19.19% | 557 | 18.43% | 473 | 15.65% | 3,022 |
| Richmond | 34,331 | 40.14% | 15,394 | 18.00% | 9,076 | 10.61% | 26,721 | 31.25% | 18,937 | 22.14% | 85,522 |
| Rockdale | 21,942 | 49.63% | 7,323 | 16.56% | 4,412 | 9.98% | 10,535 | 23.83% | 14,619 | 33.07% | 44,212 |
| Schley | 315 | 14.16% | 774 | 34.80% | 863 | 38.80% | 272 | 12.23% | -459 | -20.64% | 2,224 |
| Screven | 1,685 | 26.08% | 2,078 | 32.17% | 1,475 | 22.83% | 1,222 | 18.92% | -393 | -6.08% | 6,460 |
| Seminole | 419 | 11.19% | 1,021 | 27.28% | 1,263 | 33.74% | 1,040 | 27.79% | -602 | -16.08% | 3,743 |
| Spalding | 8,543 | 28.75% | 9,759 | 32.84% | 6,858 | 23.08% | 4,554 | 15.33% | -1,216 | -4.09% | 29,714 |
| Stephens | 1,144 | 9.87% | 2,126 | 18.35% | 6,652 | 57.40% | 1,666 | 14.38% | -5,508 | -47.53% | 11,588 |
| Stewart | 764 | 40.10% | 390 | 20.47% | 327 | 9.98% | 424 | 17.17% | 374 | 19.63% | 1,905 |
| Sumter | 4,474 | 37.35% | 2,553 | 21.31% | 2,735 | 22.83% | 2,216 | 18.50% | 1,739 | 14.52% | 11,978 |
| Talbot | 1,531 | 44.40% | 677 | 19.63% | 621 | 18.01% | 619 | 17.95% | 854 | 24.77% | 3,448 |
| Taliaferro | 343 | 38.80% | 178 | 20.14% | 150 | 16.97% | 213 | 24.09% | 165 | 18.66% | 884 |
| Tattnall | 1,200 | 15.12% | 3,047 | 38.39% | 2,332 | 29.38% | 1,358 | 17.11% | -1,847 | -23.27% | 7,937 |
| Taylor | 962 | 25.52% | 1,173 | 31.12% | 1,050 | 27.86% | 584 | 15.49% | -211 | -5.60% | 3,769 |
| Telfair | 1,003 | 23.94% | 1,187 | 28.34% | 1,293 | 30.87% | 706 | 16.85% | -200 | -4.77% | 4,189 |
| Terrell | 1,508 | 34.68% | 1,058 | 24.33% | 824 | 18.95% | 958 | 22.03% | 450 | 10.35% | 4,348 |
| Thomas | 3,809 | 17.92% | 5,725 | 26.94% | 5,759 | 27.10% | 5,960 | 28.04% | -1,950 | -9.18% | 21,253 |
| Tift | 3,284 | 20.50% | 5,603 | 34.97% | 4,473 | 27.92% | 2,663 | 16.62% | -2,319 | -14.47% | 16,023 |
| Toombs | 1,760 | 16.53% | 3,503 | 32.90% | 3,456 | 32.46% | 1,928 | 18.11% | -1,743 | -16.37% | 10,647 |
| Towns | 1,017 | 12.96% | 2,036 | 25.94% | 3,999 | 50.95% | 797 | 10.15% | -2,982 | -37.99% | 7,849 |
| Treutlen | 551 | 18.56% | 965 | 32.50% | 917 | 30.89% | 536 | 18.05% | -414 | -13.94% | 3,795 |
| Troup | 7,472 | 25.30% | 9,163 | 31.02% | 7,383 | 24.99% | 5,520 | 18.69% | -1,691 | -5.72% | 29,538 |
| Turner | 866 | 23.27% | 1,310 | 35.21% | 856 | 23.00% | 689 | 18.52% | -444 | -11.93% | 3,721 |
| Twiggs | 1,508 | 34.71% | 1,271 | 29.25% | 909 | 20.92% | 657 | 15.12% | 237 | 5.45% | 4,345 |
| Union | 1,904 | 12.39% | 3,945 | 25.68% | 8,100 | 52.73% | 1,413 | 9.20% | -6,196 | -40.33% | 15,362 |
| Upson | 3,079 | 24.19% | 4,239 | 33.30% | 3,639 | 28.59% | 1,772 | 13.92% | -1,160 | -9.11% | 12,729 |
| Walker | 2,113 | 7.41% | 12,258 | 43.00% | 7,704 | 27.03% | 6,431 | 22.56% | -10,145 | -35.59% | 28,506 |
| Walton | 8,443 | 16.75% | 22,813 | 45.26% | 12,381 | 24.56% | 6,771 | 13.43% | -14,370 | -28.51% | 50,408 |
| Ware | 1,748 | 12.72% | 3,295 | 23.98% | 5,305 | 38.60% | 3,395 | 24.70% | -3,557 | -25.88% | 13,743 |
| Warren | 817 | 31.61% | 631 | 24.41% | 445 | 17.21% | 692 | 26.77% | 186 | 7.20% | 2,585 |
| Washington | 3,046 | 33.10% | 2,376 | 25.82% | 1,911 | 20.77% | 1,869 | 20.31% | 670 | 7.28% | 9,202 |
| Wayne | 1,660 | 13.31% | 4,791 | 38.40% | 4,015 | 32.18% | 2,010 | 16.11% | -3,131 | -25.10% | 12,476 |
| Webster | 443 | 32.62% | 362 | 26.66% | 324 | 23.86% | 229 | 16.86% | 81 | 5.96% | 1,358 |
| Wheeler | 46 | 20.62% | 688 | 30.84% | 694 | 31.11% | 389 | 17.44% | -234 | -10.49% | 2,231 |
| White | 1,604 | 10.95% | 4,033 | 27.54% | 7,571 | 51.70% | 1,436 | 9.81% | -5,967 | -40.75% | 14,644 |
| Whitfield | 3,876 | 10.90% | 12,905 | 36.30% | 9,455 | 26.60% | 9,314 | 26.20% | -9,029 | -25.40% | 35,550 |
| Wilkes | 1,257 | 25.60% | 1,493 | 30.40% | 1,131 | 23.03% | 1,030 | 20.97% | -236 | -4.81% | 4,911 |
| Wilkinson | 1,539 | 32.80% | 1,407 | 29.99% | 1,057 | 22.53% | 689 | 14.68% | 132 | 2.81% | 4,692 |
| Worth | 1,589 | 17.41% | 3,541 | 38.80% | 2,774 | 30.40% | 1,222 | 13.39% | -1,952 | -21.39% | 9,126 |
| Totals | 1,617,035 | 32.90% | 1,273,214 | 25.91% | 980,454 | 19.95% | 1,043,658 | 21.24% | 343,821 | 7.00% | 4,914,361 |

==== By congressional district ====
Loeffler won seven out of 14 congressional districts to Warnock's six and Collins's one.

| District | Warnock | Loeffler | Collins | Elected Representative |
|---|---|---|---|---|
| 1st | 26.97% | 27.79% | 21.94% | Buddy Carter |
| 2nd | 37.35% | 21.47% | 18.89% | Sanford Bishop |
| 3rd | 25.21% | 33.93% | 24.2% | Drew Ferguson |
| 4th | 56.07% | 10.97% | 6.91% | Hank Johnson |
| 5th | 63.76% | 7.61% | 4.35% | Nikema Williams |
| 6th | 36.27% | 27.05% | 15.88% | Lucy McBath |
| 7th | 31.05% | 25.34% | 17.1% | Carolyn Bourdeaux |
| 8th | 22.43% | 32.57% | 25.18% | Austin Scott |
| 9th | 13.65% | 27.58% | 45.49% | Andrew Clyde |
| 10th | 25.83% | 33.76% | 22.59% | Jody Hice |
| 11th | 27.19% | 33.79% | 20.11% | Barry Loudermilk |
| 12th | 25.69% | 28.68% | 22.27% | Rick W. Allen |
| 13th | 52.91% | 12.71% | 8.12% | David Scott |
| 14th | 14.3% | 39.46% | 26.99% | Marjorie Taylor Greene |

== Runoff ==
The runoff election for Isakson's former seat was on January 5, 2021. The regularly scheduled runoff election for the Georgia U.S. Senate seat held by Republican David Perdue was also decided in a January 5 runoff, but was defeated by Jon Ossoff also in a close finish. Before the Georgia runoffs in the 2020 U.S. Senate elections, Republicans held 50 Senate seats and the Democratic caucus held 48. Warnock declared victory on January 6, 2021. If Democrats won the other Georgia runoff held on January 5, their caucus would gain control of the Senate, as the resultant 50–50 tie would be broken by Democratic vice president-elect Kamala Harris. If they lost the second race, Republicans would retain control. The extremely high political stakes caused the races to attract significant attention nationwide. They were the third and fourth Senate runoff elections held in Georgia since runoffs were first mandated in 1964, after runoffs in 1992 and 2008. It was also the third time that both of Georgia's Senate seats have been up for election at the same time, following double-barrel elections in 1914 and 1932. The Associated Press and other major news outlets called the race for Warnock in the early morning hours of January 6. His win was attributed to heavy black voter turnout.

The deadline for registration for the runoff election was December 7. Absentee ballots for the runoff were sent out beginning on November 18, and in-person voting began on December 14.

=== Predictions ===
| Source | Ranking | As of |
|---|---|---|
| The Cook Political Report | Tossup | January 4, 2021 |
| Inside Elections | Tossup | December 14, 2020 |
| Sabato's Crystal Ball | Tossup | January 5, 2021 |

=== Polling ===
Aggregate polls

| Source of poll aggregation | Dates administered | Dates updated | Kelly Loeffler Republican | Raphael Warnock Democratic | Undecided (Note: Calculated by taking the difference of 100% and all other candidates combined.) | Margin |
|---|---|---|---|---|---|---|
| 270 To Win | December 30, 2020 – January 4, 2021 | January 4, 2021 | 47.4% | 50.2% | 2.4% | Warnock +2.8 |
| RealClearPolitics | December 14, 2020 – January 4, 2021 | January 5, 2021 | 48.8% | 49.3% | 1.9% | Warnock +0.5 |
| 538 | November 9, 2020 – January 4, 2021 | January 5, 2021 | 47.2% | 49.4% | 2.2% | Warnock +2.1 |
| Average | | | 47.8% | 49.6% | 2.2% | Warnock +1.8 |

| Poll source | Date(s) administered | Sample size | Margin of error | Kelly Loeffler (R) | Raphael Warnock (D) | Other | Undecided |
|---|---|---|---|---|---|---|---|
| Trafalgar Group (R) | January 2–4, 2021 | 1,056 (LV) | ± 2.9% | 50% | 48% | – | 2% |
| AtlasIntel | January 2–4, 2021 | 857 (LV) | ± 3% | 47% | 51% | – | 2% |
| InsiderAdvantage | January 3, 2021 | 500 (LV) | ± 4.4% | 49% | 49% | – | 2% |
| National Research Inc | January 2–3, 2021 | 500 (LV) | ± 4.4% | 45% | 46% | – | 9% |
| University of Nevada Las Vegas Lee Business School | December 30, 2020 – January 3, 2021 | 550 (LV) | ± 4% | 49% | 48% | – | 3% |
| Targoz Market Research | December 30, 2020 – January 3, 2021 | 713 (LV) | ± 3.7% | 49% | 51% | – | 0% |
| Targoz Market Research | December 30, 2020 – January 3, 2021 | 1,342 (RV) | ± 3.7% | 48% | 49% | – | 3% |
| AtlasIntel | December 25, 2020 – January 1, 2021 | 1,680 (LV) | ± 2% | 47% | 51% | – | 2% |
| Gravis Marketing | December 29–30, 2020 | 1,011 (LV) | ± 3.1% | 47% | 49% | – | 3% |
| JMC Analytics and Polling | December 28–29, 2020 | 500 (LV) | ± 4.4% | 45% | 54% | – | 1% |
| Trafalgar Group (R) | December 23–27, 2020 | 1,022 (LV) | ± 3.0% | 49% | 50% | – | 1% |
| Open Model Project | December 21–27, 2020 | 1,405 (LV) | ± 4.7% | 50% | 46% | – | 4% |
| InsiderAdvantage | December 21–22, 2020 | 500 (LV) | ± 4.4% | 47% | 49% | – | 4% |
| Mellman Group | December 18–22, 2020 | 578 (LV) | ± 4.1% | 47% | 50% | – | 3% |
| Reconnect Research/Probolsky Research | December 14–22, 2020 | 1,027 (LV) | ± 4% | 42% | 43% | – | 15% |
| SurveyUSA | December 16–20, 2020 | 600 (LV) | ± 5.1% | 45% | 52% | – | 3% |
| Trafalgar Group (R) | December 14–16, 2020 | 1,064 (LV) | ± 3.0% | 52% | 46% | – | 2% |
| Emerson College | December 14–16, 2020 | 605 (LV) | ± 3.9% | 51% | 48% | – | 1% |
| InsiderAdvantage | December 14, 2020 | 500 (LV) | ± 4.4% | 49% | 48% | – | 3% |
| Wick | December 10–14, 2020 | 1,500 (LV) | – | 50% | 48% | – | 2% |
| RMG Research | December 8–14, 2020 | 1,417 (LV) | ± 2.6% | 48% | 49% | – | 4% |
| Baris/Peach State Battleground Poll | December 4–11, 2020 | 1,008 (LV) | ± 3.1% | 43% | 48% | – | 9% |
| Trafalgar Group (R) | December 8–10, 2020 | 1,018 (LV) | ± 3.0% | 50% | 47% | – | 3% |
| Fabrizio Ward/Hart Research Associates | November 30 – December 4, 2020 | 1,250 (LV) | ± 3.2% | 46% | 47% | – | 7% |
| Trafalgar Group (R) | December 1–3, 2020 | 1,083 (LV) | ± 2.9% | 50% | 45% | – | 5% |
| SurveyUSA | November 27–30, 2020 | 583 (LV) | ± 5.2% | 45% | 52% | – | 2% |
| RMG Research | November 19–24, 2020 | 1,377 (LV) | ± 2.6% | 46% | 48% | – | 6% |
| Data for Progress | November 15–20, 2020 | 1,476 (LV) | ± 2.6% | 47% | 50% | – | 4% |
| InsiderAdvantage | November 16, 2020 | 800 (LV) | ± 3.5% | 48% | 49% | – | 3% |
| VCreek/AMG (R) (Note: Archived November 19, 2020, at the Wayback Machine) (Note: Americas PAC exclusively supports Republican candidates) | November 10, 2020 | 300 (LV) | ± 5.6% | 50% | 46% | – | 5% |
| Remington Research Group | November 8–9, 2020 | 1,450 (LV) | ± 2.6% | 49% | 48% | – | 3% |
| Monmouth University | October 23–27, 2020 | 504 (LV) | ± 4.4% | 45% | 51% | – | – |
| Civiqs/Daily Kos | October 23–26, 2020 | 1,041 (LV) | ± 3.4% | 37% | 51% | 9% (Note: "Someone else" with 9%) | 2% |
| Emerson College | October 17–19, 2020 | 506 (LV) | ± 4.3% | 42% | 47% | – | 12% |
| Siena College/NYT Upshot | October 13–19, 2020 | 759 (LV) | ± 4.1% | 41% | 45% | – | 14% |
| Quinnipiac University | October 8–12, 2020 | 1,040 (LV) | ± 3.0% | 44% | 52% | 0% | 4% |
| Data for Progress | October 8–11, 2020 | 782 (LV) | ± 3.5% | 40% | 44% | – | 16% |
| Civiqs/Daily Kos | September 26–29, 2020 | 969 (LV) | ± 3.5% | 39% | 49% | 8% (Note: "Someone else" with 8%) | 4% |
| Gravis Marketing (R) | July 2, 2020 | 513 (LV) | ± 4.3% | 48% | 37% | – | 15% |
| Public Policy Polling (D) | June 25–26, 2020 | 734 (RV) | ± 3.6% | 40% | 43% | – | 17% |
| Civiqs/Daily Kos | May 16–18, 2020 | 1,339 (RV) | ± 3.1% | 32% | 45% | 18% (Note: "Someone else" with 18%) | 6% |
| Battleground Connect (R) | March 31 – April 1, 2020 | 1,035 (LV) | ± 3.0% | 40% | 41% | – | 19% |
| The Progress Campaign (D) | March 12–21, 2020 | 3,042 (RV) | ± 4.5% | 38% | 38% | – | 24% |

Hypothetical polling

Loeffler vs. Collins

| Poll source | Date(s) administered | Sample size | Margin of error | Kelly Loeffler | Doug Collins | Undecided |
|---|---|---|---|---|---|---|
| Gravis Marketing (R) | July 2, 2020 | 513 (LV) | ± 4.3% | 28% | 34% | 37% |
| Public Policy Polling (D) | December 12–13, 2019 | 711 (LV) (Note: Likely Republican primary voters, though there is no exclusively Republican primary for Georgia's special election) | — | 16% | 56% | 27% |

Loeffler vs. Lieberman

| Poll source | Date(s) administered | Sample size | Margin of error | Kelly Loeffler (R) | Matt Lieberman (D) | Other | Undecided |
|---|---|---|---|---|---|---|---|
| Data for Progress | October 8–11, 2020 | 782 (LV) | ± 3.5% | 42% | 41% | – | 17% |
| Civiqs/Daily Kos | September 26–29, 2020 | 969 (LV) | ± 3.5% | 39% | 39% | 17% (Note: "Someone else" with 17%) | 5% |
| Gravis Marketing (R) | July 2, 2020 | 513 (LV) | ± 4.3% | 46% | 39% | – | 15% |
| Civiqs/Daily Kos | May 16–18, 2020 | 1,339 (RV) | ± 3.1% | 32% | 44% | 18% | 6% |

Loeffler vs. Tarver

| Poll source | Date(s) administered | Sample size | Margin of error | Kelly Loeffler (R) | Ed Tarver (D) | Other | Undecided |
|---|---|---|---|---|---|---|---|
| Civiqs/Daily Kos | May 16–18, 2020 | 1,339 (RV) | ± 3.1% | 32% | 43% | 20% (Note: "Someone else" with 20%) | 6% |

Collins vs. Lieberman

| Poll source | Date(s) administered | Sample size | Margin of error | Doug Collins (R) | Matt Lieberman (D) | Other | Undecided |
|---|---|---|---|---|---|---|---|
| Civiqs/Daily Kos | September 26–29, 2020 | 969 (LV) | ± 3.5% | 44% | 38% | 13% (Note: "Someone else" with 13%) | 5% |
| Gravis Marketing (R) | July 2, 2020 | 513 (LV) | ± 4.3% | 46% | 37% | – | 16% |
| Civiqs/Daily Kos | May 16–18, 2020 | 1,339 (RV) | ± 3.1% | 44% | 44% | 7% (Note: "Someone else" with 7%) | 5% |

Collins vs. Tarver

| Poll source | Date(s) administered | Sample size | Margin of error | Doug Collins (R) | Ed Tarver (D) | Other | Undecided |
|---|---|---|---|---|---|---|---|
| Civiqs/Daily Kos | May 16–18, 2020 | 1,339 (RV) | ± 3.1% | 45% | 42% | 8% | 5% |

Collins vs. Warnock

| Poll source | Date(s) administered | Sample size | Margin of error | Doug Collins (R) | Raphael Warnock (D) | Other | Undecided |
|---|---|---|---|---|---|---|---|
| Monmouth University | October 23–27, 2020 | 504 (LV) | ± 4.4% | 45% | 52% | – | – |
| Civiqs/Daily Kos | October 23–26, 2020 | 1,041 (LV) | ± 3.3% | 42% | 51% | 5% (Note: "Someone else" with 5%) | 2% |
| Emerson College | October 17–19, 2020 | 506 (LV) | ± 4.3% | 47% | 48% | – | 6% |
| Siena College/NYT Upshot | October 13–19, 2020 | 759 (LV) | ± 4.1% | 41% | 45% | – | 14% |
| Quinnipiac University | October 8–12, 2020 | 1,040 (LV) | ± 3.0% | 42% | 54% | 0% | 4% |
| Civiqs/Daily Kos | September 26–29, 2020 | 969 (LV) | ± 3.5% | 44% | 49% | 4% | 4% |
| Gravis Marketing (R) | July 2, 2020 | 513 (LV) | ± 4.3% | 47% | 38% | – | 15% |
| Public Policy Polling (D) | June 25–26, 2020 | 734 (RV) | ± 3.6% | 43% | 41% | – | 17% |
| Civiqs/Daily Kos | May 16–18, 2020 | 1,339 (RV) | ± 3.1% | 44% | 45% | 6% (Note: "Someone else" with 6%) | 5% |
| The Progress Campaign (D) | May 6–15, 2020 | 2,893 (LV) | ± 2.0% | 43% | 41% | – | 16% (Note: Listed as "other/undecided") |
| Battleground Connect (R) | March 31 – April 1, 2020 | 1,035 (LV) | ± 3.0% | 49% | 36% | – | 15% |
| The Progress Campaign (D) | March 12–21, 2020 | 3,042 (RV) | ± 4.5% | 41% | 39% | – | 20% |

Loeffler vs. Broun

| Poll source | Date(s) administered | Sample size | Margin of error | Kelly Loeffler | Paul Broun | Undecided |
|---|---|---|---|---|---|---|
| Public Policy Polling (D) | December 12–13, 2019 | 711 (LV) | — | 27% | 14% | 59% |

Collins vs. Abrams

| Poll source | Date(s) administered | Sample size | Margin of error | Doug Collins (R) | Stacey Abrams (D) | Undecided |
|---|---|---|---|---|---|---|
| The Progress Campaign (D) | March 12–21, 2020 | 3,042 (RV) | ± 4.5% | 43% | 47% | 10% |

Loeffler vs. generic opponent

| Poll source | Date(s) administered | Sample size | Margin of error | Kelly Loeffler | Someone else | Undecided |
|---|---|---|---|---|---|---|
| Public Policy Polling (D) | December 12–13, 2019 | 711 (LV) | — | 26% | 30% | 44% |

with Generic Republican and Generic Democrat

| Poll source | Date(s) administered | Sample size | Margin of error | Generic Republican | Generic Democrat | Undecided |
|---|---|---|---|---|---|---|
| RMG Research/PoliticalIQ | December 8–14, 2020 | 1,377 (LV) | ± 2.6% | 46% (Note: "It is more important for Republicans to have control of the Senate" as opposed to "It is more important for Democrats to have control of the Senate" with 46%) | 42% | 11% (Note: "It does not matter which party has control of the Senate" with 7%; Undecided with 4%) |
| Quinnipiac University | September 23–27, 2020 | 1,125 (LV) | ± 2.9% | 48% | 49% | 3% |

=== Results ===
2021 United States Senate special election in Georgia runoff
| Party | Candidate | Votes | % | ±% |
|---|---|---|---|---|
| Democratic | Raphael Warnock | 2,289,113 | 51.04% | N/A |
| Republican | Kelly Loeffler (incumbent) | 2,195,841 | 48.96% | N/A |
| Total votes | | 4,484,954 | 100.00% | N/A |
| Democratic gain from Republican | | | | |

==== By county ====
By county

| County | Raphael Warnock Democratic | | Kelly Loeffler Republican | | Margin | | Total votes |
| County | # | % | # | % | # | % | Total votes |
|---|---|---|---|---|---|---|---|
| Appling | 1,596 | 21.91 | 5,690 | 78.09 | -4,094 | -56.18 | 7,286 |
| Atkinson | 722 | 27.27 | 1,926 | 72.73 | -1,204 | -45.46 | 2,648 |
| Bacon | 559 | 13.53 | 3,572 | 86.47 | -3,013 | -72.94 | 4,131 |
| Baker | 625 | 43.40 | 815 | 56.60 | -190 | -13.20 | 1,440 |
| Baldwin | 8,569 | 52.03 | 7,899 | 47.97 | 670 | 4.06 | 16,468 |
| Banks | 860 | 11.55 | 6,586 | 88.45 | -6,003 | -76.90 | 7,446 |
| Barrow | 9,417 | 29.36 | 22,660 | 70.64 | -13,243 | -41.28 | 32,077 |
| Bartow | 10,928 | 25.43 | 32,049 | 74.57 | -21,121 | -49.14 | 42,977 |
| Ben Hill | 2,193 | 38.30 | 3,533 | 61.70 | -1,340 | -23.32 | 5,726 |
| Berrien | 1,145 | 17.13 | 5,539 | 82.87 | -4,394 | -65.74 | 6,684 |
| Bibb | 39,972 | 62.92 | 23,555 | 37.08 | 16,417 | 25.84 | 63,527 |
| Bleckley | 1,214 | 23.75 | 3,898 | 76.25 | -2,684 | -52.50 | 5,112 |
| Brantley | 613 | 9.27 | 5,999 | 90.73 | -5,386 | -81.46 | 6,612 |
| Brooks | 2,455 | 39.49 | 3,761 | 60.51 | -1,306 | -21.02 | 6,216 |
| Bryan | 6,009 | 32.30 | 12,596 | 67.70 | -6,587 | -35.40 | 18,605 |
| Bulloch | 9,848 | 37.68 | 16,287 | 62.32 | -6,439 | -24.64 | 26,135 |
| Burke | 4,695 | 49.43 | 4,804 | 50.57 | -109 | -1.14 | 9,499 |
| Butts | 3,026 | 29.64 | 7,183 | 70.36 | -4,157 | -40.72 | 10,209 |
| Calhoun | 1,206 | 59.35 | 826 | 40.65 | 380 | 18.70 | 2,032 |
| Camden | 6,807 | 34.26 | 13,063 | 65.74 | -6,256 | -31.49 | 19,870 |
| Candler | 1,131 | 28.87 | 2,787 | 71.13 | -1,656 | -42.26 | 3,918 |
| Carroll | 14,819 | 31.42 | 32,338 | 68.58 | -17,519 | -37.16 | 47,157 |
| Catoosa | 5,985 | 21.55 | 21,792 | 78.45 | -15,807 | -56.90 | 27,777 |
| Charlton | 952 | 24.42 | 2,947 | 75.58 | -1,995 | -51.16 | 3,899 |
| Chatham | 72,550 | 59.83 | 48,707 | 40.17 | 23,843 | 19.66 | 121,257 |
| Chattahoochee | 601 | 45.50 | 720 | 54.50 | -119 | -9.00 | 1,321 |
| Chattooga | 1,686 | 20.47 | 6,550 | 79.53 | -4,864 | -59.06 | 8,236 |
| Cherokee | 38,362 | 30.01 | 89,480 | 69.99 | -51,118 | -39.98 | 127,842 |
| Clarke | 33,187 | 71.84 | 13,009 | 28.16 | 20,178 | 43.68 | 46,196 |
| Clay | 727 | 55.50 | 583 | 44.50 | 144 | 11.00 | 1,310 |
| Clayton | 91,189 | 88.57 | 11,765 | 11.43 | 79,424 | 77.14 | 102,954 |
| Clinch | 616 | 25.09 | 1,839 | 74.91 | -1,223 | -49.82 | 2,455 |
| Cobb | 203,876 | 56.85 | 154,714 | 43.15 | 49,162 | 13.70 | 358,590 |
| Coffee | 4,082 | 30.88 | 9,137 | 69.12 | -5,055 | -38.24 | 13,129 |
| Colquitt | 3,727 | 26.51 | 10,330 | 73.49 | -6,603 | -46.98 | 14,057 |
| Columbia | 26,545 | 36.80 | 45,588 | 63.20 | -19,043 | -26.40 | 72,133 |
| Cook | 1,895 | 30.54 | 4,310 | 69.46 | -2,415 | -38.92 | 6,205 |
| Coweta | 21,825 | 32.44 | 45,462 | 67.56 | -23,637 | -35.12 | 67,287 |
| Crawford | 1,502 | 27.96 | 3,869 | 72.04 | -2,367 | -44.08 | 5,371 |
| Crisp | 2,702 | 37.85 | 4,436 | 62.15 | -1,734 | -24.30 | 7,138 |
| Dade | 1,111 | 17.53 | 5,227 | 82.47 | -4,116 | -64.94 | 6,338 |
| Dawson | 2,274 | 15.81 | 12,113 | 84.19 | -9,839 | -68.38 | 14,387 |
| Decatur | 4,121 | 41.02 | 5,926 | 58.98 | -1,805 | -17.78 | 10,047 |
| DeKalb | 293,902 | 84.12 | 55,479 | 15.88 | 238,423 | 68.24 | 349,381 |
| Dodge | 2,021 | 28.14 | 5,160 | 71.86 | -3,139 | -43.72 | 7,181 |
| Dooly | 1,812 | 48.40 | 1,932 | 51.60 | -120 | -3.20 | 3,744 |
| Dougherty | 22,793 | 70.98 | 9,320 | 29.02 | 13,473 | 41.96 | 32,113 |
| Douglas | 40,630 | 65.14 | 21,743 | 34.86 | 18,887 | 30.28 | 62,373 |
| Early | 2,172 | 47.75 | 2,377 | 52.25 | -205 | -4.50 | 4,549 |
| Echols | 128 | 10.79 | 1,058 | 89.21 | -930 | -78.42 | 1,186 |
| Effingham | 7,137 | 25.66 | 20,682 | 74.34 | -13,545 | -48.68 | 27,819 |
| Elbert | 2,482 | 30.97 | 5,531 | 69.03 | -3,049 | -38.06 | 8,013 |
| Emanuel | 2,569 | 30.74 | 5,787 | 69.26 | -3,218 | -38.52 | 8,356 |
| Evans | 1,201 | 32.11 | 2,539 | 67.89 | -1,338 | -35.78 | 3,740 |
| Fannin | 2,436 | 18.13 | 11,004 | 81.88 | -8,568 | -63.75 | 13,440 |
| Fayette | 31,297 | 46.44 | 36,094 | 53.56 | -4,167 | -7.12 | 67,391 |
| Floyd | 10,834 | 30.27 | 24,959 | 69.73 | -14,125 | -39.46 | 35,793 |
| Forsyth | 37,687 | 32.73 | 77,451 | 67.27 | -39,764 | -34.54 | 115,138 |
| Franklin | 1,345 | 14.64 | 7,840 | 85.36 | -6,495 | -70.72 | 9,185 |
| Fulton | 354,552 | 72.54 | 134,191 | 27.46 | 220,361 | 45.08 | 488,743 |
| Gilmer | 2,697 | 18.19 | 12,132 | 81.81 | -9,435 | -63.62 | 14,829 |
| Glascock | 130 | 9.53 | 1,234 | 90.47 | -1,104 | -80.94 | 1,364 |
| Glynn | 13,981 | 37.35 | 23,448 | 62.65 | -9,467 | -25.30 | 37,429 |
| Gordon | 3,929 | 19.30 | 16,425 | 80.70 | -12,496 | -61.40 | 20,354 |
| Grady | 3,102 | 33.25 | 6,226 | 66.75 | -3,124 | -33.50 | 9,328 |
| Greene | 3,758 | 35.41 | 6,855 | 64.59 | -3,097 | -29.18 | 11,247 |
| Gwinnett | 224,197 | 60.63 | 145,597 | 39.37 | 78,600 | 21.26 | 369,794 |
| Habersham | 3,243 | 18.00 | 14,776 | 82.00 | -11,533 | -64.00 | 18,019 |
| Hall | 22,296 | 28.22 | 56,718 | 71.78 | -34,422 | -43.56 | 79,014 |
| Hancock | 2,780 | 72.43 | 1,058 | 27.57 | 1,722 | 43.84 | 3,838 |
| Haralson | 1,626 | 13.37 | 10,533 | 86.63 | -8,907 | -73.26 | 12,159 |
| Harris | 5,034 | 27.52 | 13,258 | 72.48 | -8,224 | -44.96 | 18,292 |
| Hart | 2,847 | 25.42 | 8,354 | 74.58 | -5,507 | -49.16 | 11,201 |
| Heard | 801 | 17.12 | 3,877 | 82.88 | -3,076 | -65.76 | 4,678 |
| Henry | 68,576 | 62.68 | 40,824 | 37.32 | 27,752 | 25.36 | 109,400 |
| Houston | 29,749 | 44.81 | 36,644 | 55.19 | -6,895 | -10.38 | 66,393 |
| Irwin | 885 | 24.47 | 2,732 | 75.53 | -1,847 | -51.06 | 3,617 |
| Jackson | 6,925 | 21.25 | 25,658 | 78.75 | -18,733 | -57.50 | 32,583 |
| Jasper | 1,683 | 24.74 | 5,120 | 75.26 | -3,437 | -50.52 | 6,803 |
| Jeff Davis | 937 | 18.44 | 4,143 | 81.56 | -3,206 | -63.12 | 5,080 |
| Jefferson | 3,767 | 54.39 | 3,159 | 45.61 | 608 | 8.78 | 6,926 |
| Jenkins | 1,169 | 37.54 | 1,945 | 62.46 | -776 | -24.92 | 3,114 |
| Johnson | 1,047 | 29.28 | 2,529 | 70.72 | -1,482 | -41.44 | 3,576 |
| Jones | 4,534 | 34.00 | 8,803 | 66.00 | -4,269 | -32.00 | 13,337 |
| Lamar | 2,428 | 30.40 | 5,558 | 69.60 | -3,130 | -39.20 | 7,986 |
| Lanier | 910 | 29.97 | 2,126 | 70.03 | -1,216 | -40.06 | 3,036 |
| Laurens | 7,435 | 36.73 | 12,806 | 63.27 | -5,371 | -26.54 | 20,241 |
| Lee | 4,240 | 28.46 | 10,657 | 71.54 | -6,417 | -43.08 | 14,897 |
| Liberty | 11,875 | 64.78 | 6,457 | 35.22 | 5,418 | 29.56 | 18,332 |
| Lincoln | 1,317 | 31.21 | 2,903 | 68.79 | -1,586 | -37.58 | 4,220 |
| Long | 1,803 | 38.87 | 2,835 | 61.13 | -1,032 | -22.26 | 4,638 |
| Lowndes | 17,382 | 43.63 | 22,455 | 56.37 | -5,073 | -12.74 | 39,837 |
| Lumpkin | 2,868 | 20.94 | 10,831 | 79.06 | -7,963 | -58.12 | 13,699 |
| Macon | 2,685 | 62.79 | 1,591 | 37.21 | 1,094 | 25.58 | 4,276 |
| Madison | 3,102 | 23.49 | 10,101 | 76.51 | -6,999 | -53.02 | 13,203 |
| Marion | 1,217 | 37.90 | 1,994 | 62.10 | -777 | -24.20 | 3,211 |
| McDuffie | 3,752 | 40.64 | 5,480 | 59.36 | -1,728 | -18.72 | 9,232 |
| McIntosh | 2,417 | 40.64 | 3,531 | 59.36 | -1,114 | -18.72 | 5,948 |
| Meriwether | 4,036 | 41.00 | 5,808 | 59.00 | -1,772 | -19.00 | 9,844 |
| Miller | 651 | 26.53 | 1,803 | 73.47 | -1,152 | -46.94 | 2,454 |
| Mitchell | 3,569 | 45.36 | 4,300 | 54.64 | -731 | -9.28 | 7,869 |
| Monroe | 4,058 | 28.75 | 10,057 | 71.25 | -5,999 | -42.50 | 14,115 |
| Montgomery | 896 | 25.41 | 2,630 | 74.59 | -1,734 | -49.18 | 3,526 |
| Morgan | 3,129 | 28.91 | 7,696 | 71.09 | -4,567 | -42.18 | 10,825 |
| Murray | 2,028 | 15.61 | 10,966 | 84.39 | -8,938 | -68.78 | 12,994 |
| Muscogee | 45,049 | 62.99 | 26,473 | 37.01 | 18,576 | 25.98 | 71,522 |
| Newton | 28,324 | 58.02 | 20,493 | 41.98 | 7,831 | 16.04 | 48,817 |
| Oconee | 7,496 | 31.85 | 16,041 | 68.15 | -8,545 | -36.30 | 23,557 |
| Oglethorpe | 2,259 | 31.30 | 4,959 | 68.70 | -2,700 | -37.40 | 7,218 |
| Paulding | 27,335 | 36.96 | 46,619 | 63.04 | -19,284 | -26.08 | 73,954 |
| Peach | 5,350 | 48.41 | 5,701 | 51.59 | -351 | -3.18 | 11,051 |
| Pickens | 2,612 | 17.25 | 12,532 | 82.75 | -9,920 | -65.50 | 15,144 |
| Pierce | 947 | 11.95 | 6,980 | 88.05 | -6,033 | -76.10 | 7,927 |
| Pike | 1,391 | 14.44 | 8,241 | 85.56 | -6,850 | -71.12 | 9,632 |
| Polk | 3,325 | 22.39 | 11,525 | 77.61 | -8,200 | -55.22 | 14,850 |
| Pulaski | 1,138 | 30.92 | 2,543 | 69.08 | -1,405 | -38.16 | 3,681 |
| Putnam | 3,448 | 29.08 | 8,291 | 69.94 | -4,843 | -40.85 | 11,855 |
| Quitman | 497 | 44.94 | 604 | 54.61 | -107 | -9.67 | 1,106 |
| Rabun | 1,984 | 20.74 | 7,474 | 78.11 | -5,490 | -57.38 | 9,568 |
| Randolph | 1,671 | 54.36 | 1,391 | 45.25 | 280 | 9.11 | 3,074 |
| Richmond | 59,124 | 67.95 | 26,781 | 30.78 | 32,343 | 37.17 | 87,016 |
| Rockdale | 31,244 | 69.92 | 13,012 | 29.12 | 18,232 | 40.80 | 44,686 |
| Schley | 462 | 20.31 | 1,800 | 79.12 | -1,338 | -58.81 | 2,275 |
| Screven | 2,661 | 40.15 | 3,916 | 59.08 | -1,255 | -18.93 | 6,628 |
| Seminole | 1,254 | 32.29 | 2,611 | 67.22 | -1,357 | -34.94 | 3,884 |
| Spalding | 11,784 | 39.13 | 18,057 | 59.96 | -6,273 | -20.83 | 30,116 |
| Stephens | 2,385 | 20.07 | 9,368 | 78.82 | -6,983 | -58.75 | 11,885 |
| Stewart | 1,182 | 59.40 | 801 | 40.25 | 381 | 19.15 | 1,990 |
| Sumter | 6,318 | 52.00 | 5,732 | 47.18 | 586 | 4.82 | 12,150 |
| Talbot | 2,114 | 60.02 | 1,392 | 39.52 | 722 | 20.50 | 3,522 |
| Taliaferro | 561 | 60.45 | 360 | 38.79 | 201 | 21.66 | 928 |
| Tattnall | 2,061 | 25.19 | 6,053 | 73.97 | -3,992 | -48.78 | 8,183 |
| Taylor | 1,387 | 36.13 | 2,418 | 62.99 | -1,031 | -26.86 | 3,839 |
| Telfair | 1,487 | 34.32 | 2,825 | 65.20 | -1,338 | -30.88 | 4,333 |
| Terrell | 2,376 | 53.80 | 2,004 | 45.38 | 372 | 8.42 | 4,416 |
| Thomas | 8,708 | 39.85 | 12,954 | 59.28 | -4,246 | -19.43 | 21,853 |
| Tift | 5,322 | 32.68 | 10,784 | 66.23 | -5,462 | -33.54 | 16,283 |
| Toombs | 2,939 | 26.93 | 7,872 | 72.13 | -4,933 | -45.20 | 10,914 |
| Towns | 1,550 | 19.43 | 6,384 | 80.01 | -4,834 | -60.58 | 7,979 |
| Treutlen | 952 | 30.94 | 2,101 | 68.28 | -1,149 | -37.34 | 3,077 |
| Troup | 11,578 | 38.53 | 18,143 | 60.38 | -6,565 | -21.85 | 30,049 |
| Turner | 1,410 | 37.18 | 2,349 | 61.95 | -939 | -24.76 | 3,792 |
| Twiggs | 2,044 | 45.99 | 2,370 | 53.33 | -326 | -7.34 | 4,444 |
| Union | 2,801 | 18.00 | 12,651 | 81.30 | -9,850 | -63.30 | 15,560 |
| Upson | 4,201 | 32.55 | 8,608 | 66.70 | -4,407 | -34.15 | 12,905 |
| Walker | 5,769 | 19.65 | 23,174 | 78.95 | -17,405 | -59.29 | 29,354 |
| Walton | 12,682 | 24.82 | 37,842 | 74.06 | -25,160 | -49.24 | 51,095 |
| Ware | 4,211 | 29.67 | 9,865 | 69.51 | -5,654 | -39.84 | 14,192 |
| Warren | 1,469 | 55.41 | 1,166 | 43.98 | 303 | 11.43 | 2,651 |
| Washington | 4,730 | 50.01 | 4,663 | 49.30 | 67 | 0.71 | 9,459 |
| Wayne | 2,687 | 21.03 | 9,987 | 78.16 | -7,300 | -57.13 | 12,778 |
| Webster | 639 | 45.97 | 748 | 53.81 | -109 | -7.84 | 1,390 |
| Wheeler | 689 | 30.15 | 1,583 | 69.28 | -894 | -39.12 | 2,285 |
| White | 2,411 | 16.27 | 12,222 | 82.49 | -9,811 | -66.22 | 14,816 |
| Whitfield | 10,670 | 29.04 | 25,636 | 69.77 | -14,966 | -40.73 | 36,746 |
| Wilcox | 862 | 26.27 | 2,403 | 73.24 | -1,541 | -46.97 | 3,281 |
| Wilkes | 2,160 | 42.95 | 2,823 | 56.13 | -663 | -13.18 | 5,029 |
| Wilkinson | 2,075 | 43.50 | 2,664 | 55.85 | -589 | -12.35 | 4,770 |
| Worth | 2,395 | 25.79 | 6,830 | 73.56 | -4,435 | -47.77 | 9,285 |
| Totals | 2,289,113 | 51.04 | 2,195,841 | 48.96 | 93,550 | 2.09 | 4,484,296 |

Counties that flipped from Republican to Democratic

- Baldwin (largest municipality: Milledgeville)
- Cobb (largest municipality: Marietta)
- Gwinnett (largest municipality: Peachtree Corners)
- Henry (largest municipality: Stockbridge)
- Newton (largest municipality: Covington)
- Randolph (largest municipality: Cuthbert)
- Sumter (largest municipality: Americus)
- Terrell (largest municipality: Dawson)
- Washington (largest municipality: Sandersville)

==== By congressional district ====
Despite losing the statewide runoff, Loeffler won eight of 14 congressional districts.

| District | Loeffler | Warnock | Elected Representative |
|---|---|---|---|
| 1st | 56% | 44% | Buddy Carter |
| 2nd | 43% | 57% | Sanford Bishop |
| 3rd | 62% | 38% | Drew Ferguson |
| 4th | 19% | 81% | Hank Johnson |
| 5th | 13% | 87% | Nikema Williams |
| 6th | 46% | 54% | Lucy McBath |
| 7th | 46% | 54% | Carolyn Bourdeaux |
| 8th | 62% | 38% | Austin Scott |
| 9th | 77% | 23% | Andrew Clyde |
| 10th | 60% | 40% | Jody Hice |
| 11th | 58% | 42% | Barry Loudermilk |
| 12th | 56% | 44% | Rick W. Allen |
| 13th | 21% | 79% | David Scott |
| 14th | 73% | 27% | Marjorie Taylor Greene |

== Election-related lawsuits ==
Republicans filed two federal and one state lawsuit in December to restrict the January 5 vote. On December 17, Judge Eleanor L. Ross found that plaintiffs lacked standing based on possible future harm to toss out a consent decree regarding signatures on absentee ballot applications. Judge James Randal Hall threw out another case that tried to block the use of drop boxes for absentee ballots. A third lawsuit, to restrict the use of drop boxes, was heard in state court on December 24.

On December 18, a federal judge threw out a Republican lawsuit alleging that out-of-state residents were voting in the runoff election, as Republican attorney Bill Price had recommended. Another lawsuit was filed against the use of voting machines manufactured by Dominion Voting Systems, alleging that election officials are handling mail-in absentee ballots improperly and illegally.

Judge Leslie Abrams Gardner, sister of Democratic politician Stacey Abrams, of the United States District Court for the Middle District of Georgia rejected the attempted purge of 4,000 voters in Muscogee County and Ben Hill County, Georgia, on December 29. The ruling means the voters were able to participate in the January 5 runoff election. The ruling was amended to allow provisional voting to prevent election-day challenges.

== See also ==
- 2020–21 United States Senate election in Georgia
- 2020 Georgia (U.S. state) elections
- 117th United States Congress
- List of special elections to the United States Senate

== Notes ==
Partisan clients

Voter samples and additional candidates

Miscellaneous
