= Kurt Erskine =

American lawyer

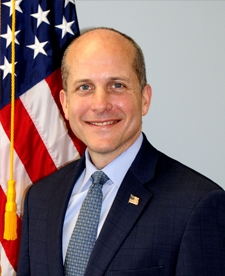

United States Attorney for the Northern District of Georgia
- Acting
- In office February 1, 2021 – May 2, 2022
- President: Joe Biden
- Preceded by: Bobby Christine
- Succeeded by: Ryan K. Buchanan

Personal details
- Education: College of William & Mary (BA); University of Kansas (MHA, JD)

Kurt R. Erskine is an American attorney who served as the acting U.S. Attorney for the United States District Court for the Northern District of Georgia. He served in office from February 1, 2021 to May 2, 2022.

== Background ==
Erskine earned a Bachelor of Arts in public policy from the College of William & Mary, a Masters of Health Services Administration from the University of Kansas School of Allied Health, and a Juris Doctor from the University of Kansas School of Law. Erskine served as the First Assistant United States Attorney and chief of the public corruption division of the United States Attorney's office for the Northern District of Georgia.
