= Jill E. Steinberg =

American lawyer

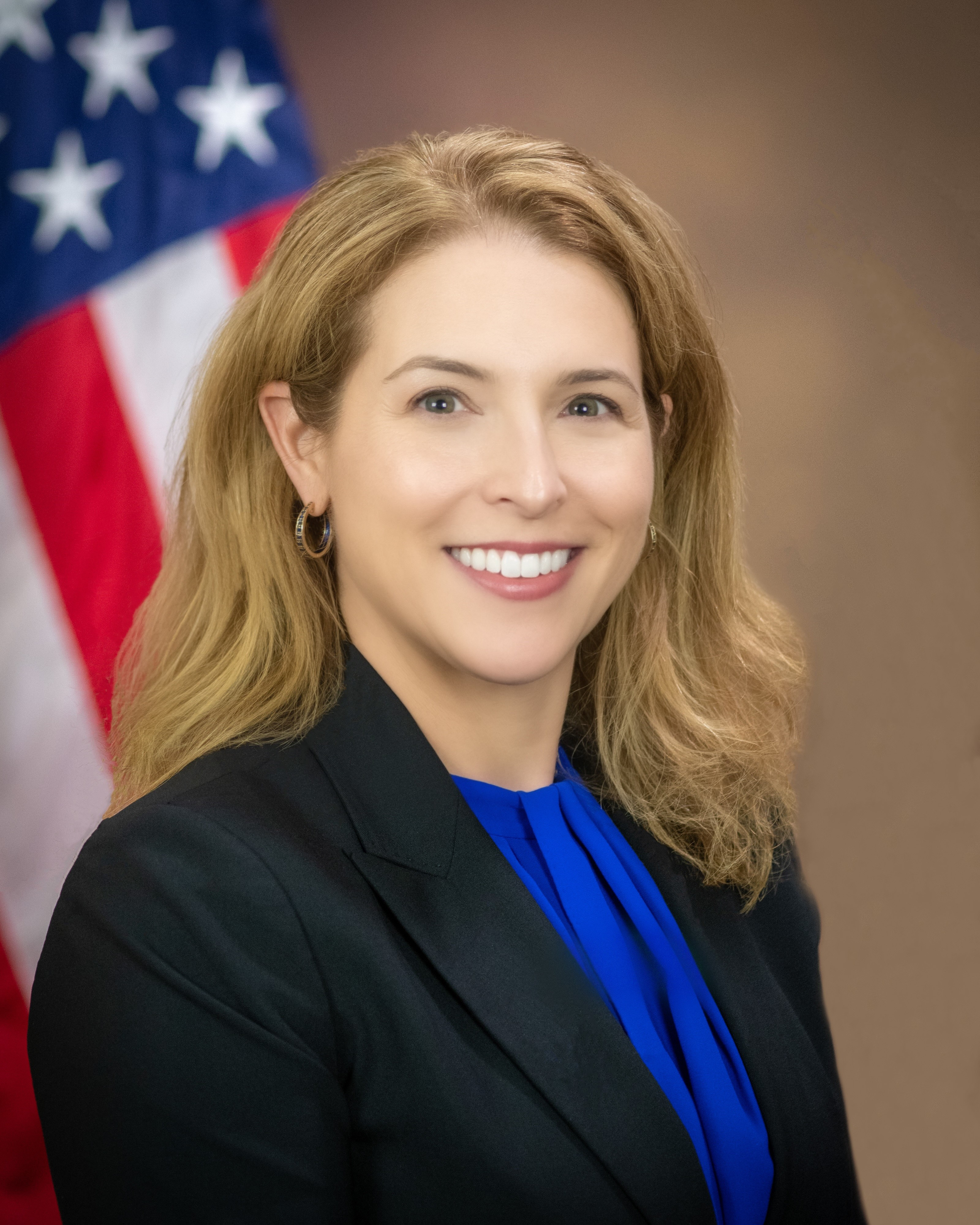

United States Attorney for the Southern District of Georgia
- In office February 22, 2023 – January 17, 2025
- Appointed by: Joe Biden
- Preceded by: Bobby Christine
- Succeeded by: Tara M. Lyons (acting)

Personal details
- Education: University of Georgia (BA); Duke University (JD)

Jill Ellen Steinberg is an American lawyer who served as the United States attorney for the Southern District of Georgia February 2023 to January 2025.

== Education ==
Steinberg received her Bachelor of Arts, summa cum laude, from the University of Georgia in 1995 and a Juris Doctor from Duke University Law School in 1998.

== Career ==
Steinberg began her legal career serving as an assistant district attorney for the Philadelphia District Attorney's Office from 1998 to 2001. From 2001 to 2008, she was an associate at Rogers & Hardin LLP in Atlanta, Georgia. From 2008 to 2014 and 2016 to 2021, Steinberg served as an assistant United States attorney in the United States Attorney's Office for the Northern District of Georgia. From 2014 to 2016, she worked at the United States Department of Justice in Washington, D.C., serving as an associate deputy attorney general in the Office of the Deputy Attorney General from 2015 to 2016 and as an attorney advisor in the National Security Division from 2014 to 2015. In 2021, she became a partner at Ballard Spahr LLP.

=== Nomination as U.S. attorney ===
On October 19, 2022, President Joe Biden announced his intent to nominate Steinberg to be the United States attorney for the Southern District of Georgia. On November 14, 2022, her nomination was sent to the Senate. On January 3, 2023, her nomination was returned to the president under Rule XXXI, Paragraph 6 of the United States Senate. She was renominated on January 23, 2023. On February 9, 2023, her nomination was reported out of the Senate Judiciary Committee by a voice vote, with Senators Ted Cruz, Josh Hawley and Marsha Blackburn voting no on record. On February 16, 2023, the United States Senate confirmed her nomination by voice vote. She was sworn in by District Court Chief Judge James Randal Hall on February 22, 2023. She resigned on January 17, 2025.

Legal offices
Preceded by Bobby Christine	United States Attorney for the Southern District of Georgia; 2023–2025	Succeeded by Tara M. Lyons; Acting
