= Bobby Christine =

American attorney (born 1969)

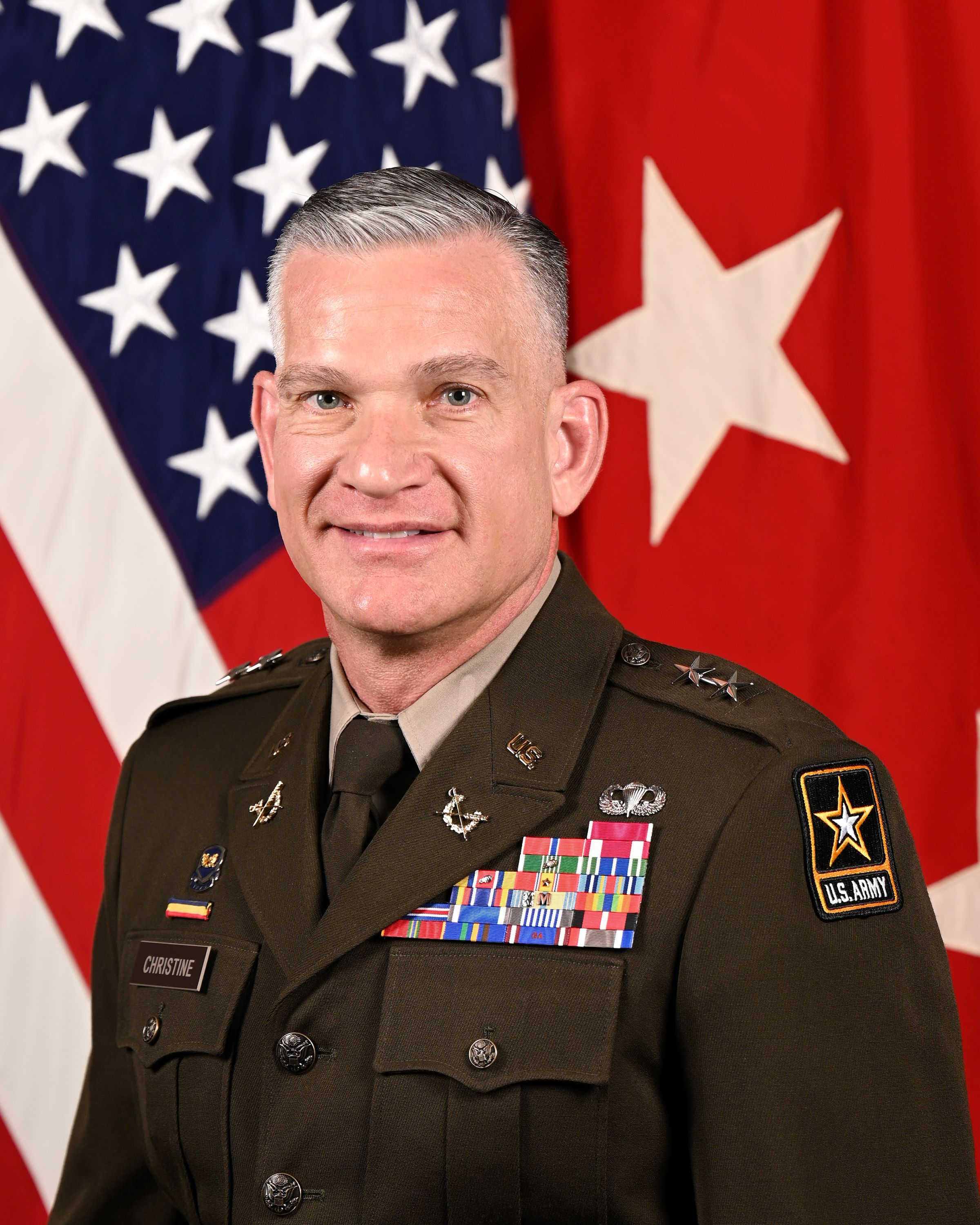

43rd Judge Advocate General of the Army
- Incumbent
- Assumed office July 1, 2025
- President: Donald Trump
- Secretary: Daniel P. Driscoll
- Preceded by: LTG Joseph B. Berger III; MG Robert A. Borcherding (acting)

District Attorney of the Columbia County Judicial Circuit
- In office July 22, 2021 – June 30, 2025
- Appointed by: Brian Kemp
- Preceded by: Circuit established

United States Attorney for the Northern District of Georgia
- Acting; January 4, 2021 – February 1, 2021
- President: Donald Trump; Joe Biden
- Preceded by: B. J. Pak
- Succeeded by: Kurt Erskine (acting)

United States Attorney for the Southern District of Georgia
- In office November 22, 2017 – February 9, 2021
- President: Donald Trump; Joe Biden
- Preceded by: Ed Tarver
- Succeeded by: Jill E. Steinberg

Personal details
- Born: Bobby Lee Christine; September 17, 1969 (age 56)
- Spouse: Sheri Christine
- Relations: Admiral Brian Christine (brother)
- Education: Georgia Military College (AA); University of Georgia (BA); Samford University (JD); United States Army War College (MA)

Military service
- Allegiance: United States
- Branch/service: United States Army
- Years of service: 1986–present
- Rank: Major General
- Unit: U.S. Army Judge Advocate General's Corps; 265th Engineer Group; United States Army Reserve; Georgia National Guard
- Commands: U.S. Army Judge Advocate General's Corps
- Battles/wars: Iraq War; Global war on terrorism
- Awards: U.S. Army Parachutist Badge; Legion of Merit; Meritorious Service Medal; Bronze Star Medal

Bobby Lee Christine (born September 17, 1969) is an American attorney, military officer, and former judge. Since July 2025, he has served as the 43rd judge advocate general of the Army, the senior uniformed lawyer in the United States Army. Simultaneously the district attorney of the Columbia County Judicial Circuit since July 2021, Christine was previously the United States Attorney for the United States District Court for the Southern District of Georgia from 2017 to 2021. He briefly also served as the Acting U.S. Attorney for the United States District Court for the Northern District of Georgia in 2021. Christine was previously an Assistant District Attorney in Augusta, Georgia. He is a former magistrate judge in Columbia County, Georgia, and partner at the law firm of Christine and Evans LLC.

== Education ==
Christine earned undergraduate degrees from Georgia Military College and the University of Georgia, and his Juris Doctor from Samford University's Cumberland School of Law in Birmingham. He has a master's degree from the U.S. Army War College in Carlisle, Pennsylvania.

== Career ==
He worked as a prosecutor in the Augusta district attorney's office for a decade. From 2005 until 2017 he was a judge of the Magistrate Court for Columbia County, serving as chief magistrate from 2009 to 2012. He also maintained a private practice until 2017.

Christine is a veteran of the United States Armed Forces, having joined the Army National Guard at age 17 and earned his commission as an officer at age 19. He remains a reservist as of 2025 with the rank of major general. Christine entered the U.S. Army JAG Corps. Christine has served as a combat engineer platoon leader, company executive officer, Judge Advocate General Trial Counsel, Brigade Judge Advocate, and State Judge Advocate. He earned several medals, including the Bronze Star, for meritorious service after spending time in Iraq as a Judge Advocate General and a combat engineer with the 265th Engineer Group.

=== U.S. Attorney for the Southern District of Georgia ===
On September 11, 2017, Christine was nominated to be the United States Attorney for the United States District Court for the Southern District of Georgia by President Donald Trump. He was confirmed by the United States Senate by voice vote on November 15, 2017, and sworn into office on November 22, 2017.

=== Acting U.S. Attorney for the Northern District of Georgia ===
On January 5, 2021, Trump named Christine the Acting United States Attorney for the United States District Court for the Northern District of Georgia after B. J. Pak abruptly resigned from the post the prior day. Reportedly, Trump expected Christine to support his claims of election fraud in Georgia, which Pak had refused to do. However, a few days after taking office, Christine privately informed his staff that "there's just nothing to" those allegations, and he never said anything publicly on the subject.

The U.S. Attorney's office announced Christine's resignation on February 1, 2021. His resignation was effective February 9.

=== District attorney for Columbia County ===
In April 2021 he was appointed the first district attorney for Columbia County, Georgia, whose judicial circuit was split from that of Richmond County in March.

=== Major general and Judge Advocate General ===
Christine was promoted to the two-star rank of major general on February 1, 2024, making him the first reserve component officer in the Army's Judge Advocate General’s (JAG) Corps to achieve this rank since the Corps' inception in 1775. As a major general, Christine served as acting general counsel of the National Guard Bureau, while concurrently exercising duties as Columbia County district attorney.

In June 2025, Christine was nominated for appointment as the judge advocate general of the Army; upon confirmation by the Senate, he assumed the office on July 1, 2025.

== Personal life ==
He and his wife Sheri have three children and live in Evans, Georgia. Christine is also the brother of U.S. Public Health Service Admiral Brian Christine, the 18th assistant secretary for health.

Legal offices
Preceded by Ed Tarver	United States Attorney for the Southern District of Georgia; 2017–2021	Succeeded by Jill E. Steinberg
Preceded by B. J. Pak	United States Attorney for the Northern District of Georgia; Acting; 2021	Succeeded by Kurt Erskine; Acting
New office	District Attorney of the Columbia County Judicial Circuit; 2021–present	Incumbent
Military offices
Preceded by Robert A. Borcherding; Acting	Judge Advocate General of the United States Army; 2025–present	Incumbent
