= Brian Christine =

American urologist (born 1963/1964)

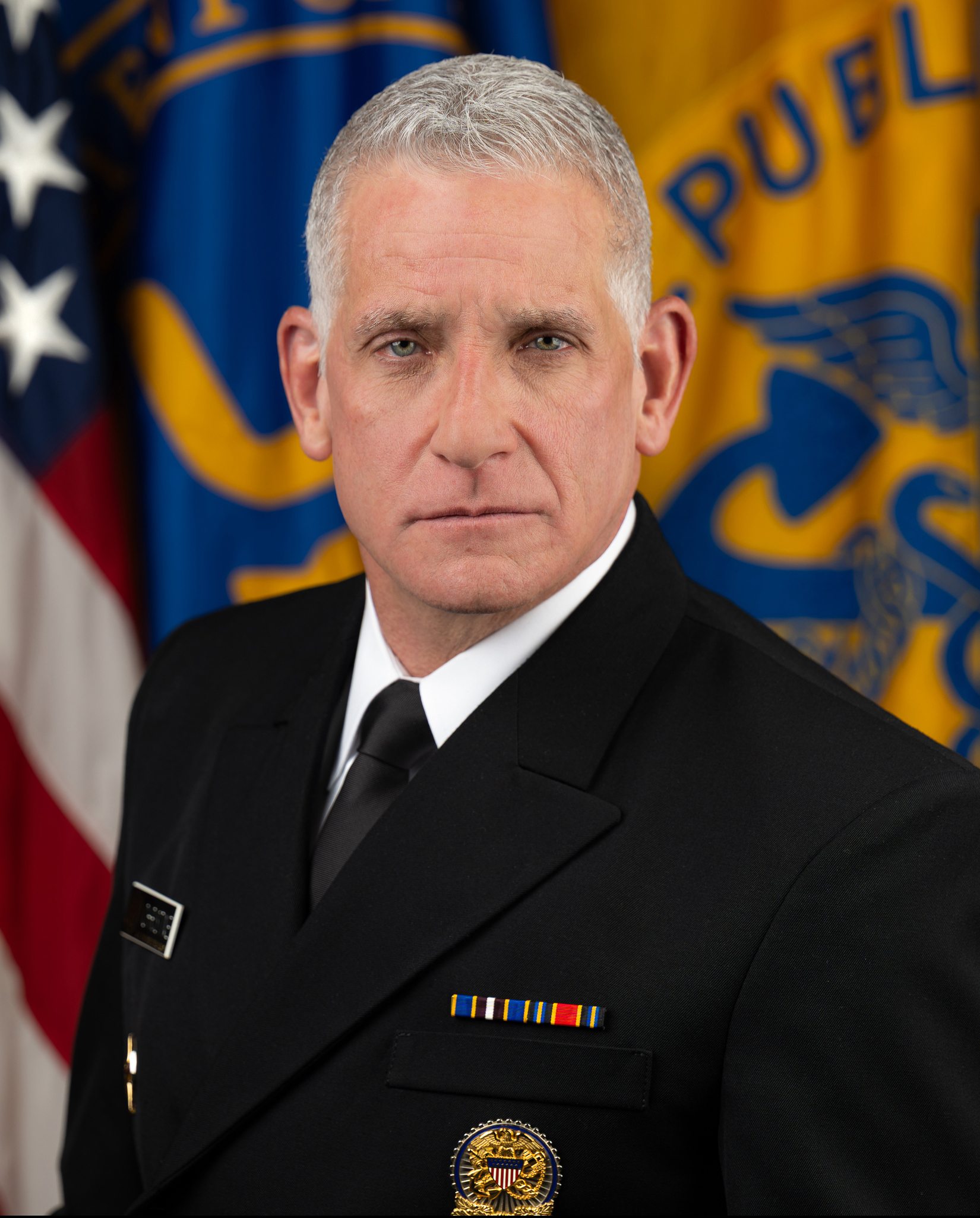
- Official portrait, 2025

18th Assistant Secretary for Health
- Incumbent
- Assumed office November 11, 2025
- President: Donald Trump
- Secretary: Robert F. Kennedy Jr.
- Preceded by: Rachel Levine

Personal details
- Born: Brian Sam Christine; 1963 or 1964 (age 62–63)
- Party: Republican
- Spouse: Kellie Bourland (m. 2003)
- Relatives: Bobby Christine (brother)
- Education: Emory University (MD)
- Uniformed service
- Allegiance: United States
- Branch: United States Public Health Service Commissioned Corps
- Service years: 2025–present
- Rank: Admiral
- Christine's voice Christine explains how donating blood saves lives Recorded January 30, 2026

Brian Sam Christine (born 1963 or 1964) is an American urologist and politician who has served as the assistant secretary for health since 2025.

Christine graduated from Emory University with a Doctor of Medicine and completed his residency at the University of Alabama at Birmingham. He worked at the Urology Centers of Alabama and later established his own practice in Birmingham, Alabama. In 2022, Christine unsuccessfully ran for Alabama's fifteenth Senate district in that year's election. The following year, he ran in a special election for the Jefferson County Commission, but withdrew his candidacy.

In March 2025, President Donald Trump nominated Christine to serve as the assistant secretary for health. He was appointed as a four-star admiral in the U.S. Public Health Service Commissioned Corps and confirmed by the Senate in October. Christine moved to block federal funding for gender transition care and was involved in the Trump administration's response to the MV Hondius hantavirus outbreak.

== Early life and education ==
Brian Sam Christine was born in 1963 or 1964. Christine is a descendant of Italian immigrants to the United States. His brother, Bobby, later became the judge advocate general of the United States Army. Christine graduated from Emory University with a Doctor of Medicine. He is Catholic.

== Career ==
=== Urology practice ===
After graduating from Emory University, Christine took residency at the University of Alabama at Birmingham. He joined the Urology Centers of Alabama after completing his residency. Christine's work specialized in penile implant surgery, and he published several papers on the procedures. In October 2003, Christine married Kellie Bourland. By October 2011, Christine had become the director of erectile restoration and prosthetic urology at Urology Centers of Alabama.

By 2017, Christine had established a urology practice in Birmingham, Alabama. The practice advertised itself as inclusive of gay and transgender men, and a medical conference biography stated that his practice specialized in erectile dysfunction in transgender men following gender-affirming surgery. However, in March 2025, he told The Wall Street Journal that he had never treated a transgender patient. By that month, Christine's practice employed thirty doctors. He hosted a YouTube show, Erection Connection, for urologists to learn about erectile dysfunction and a podcast, Common Sense.

=== Political activities ===
Christine is a Republican donor. In December 2021, he introduced Lynda Blanchard in her campaign announcement for the 2022 Alabama gubernatorial election. In April 2022, Christine announced a campaign in that year's Alabama Senate Republican primary election for the state's fifteenth district. The following month, the incumbent senator, Dan Roberts, defeated Christine in the primary. In May 2023, Christine stated that he would run for a seat on the Jefferson County Commission vacated by the resignation of Steve Ammons. That month, he withdrew from the election and endorsed Mike Bolin, a former Alabama Supreme Court justice. Christine donated US$8,000 to Donald Trump's 2024 presidential campaign.

== Assistant Secretary for Health (2025–present) ==
Christine explains how blood donations save lives on January 30, 2026

On 24 March 2025, President Donald Trump nominated Christine to serve as the assistant secretary for health. Christine appeared before the Senate Committee on Health, Education, Labor and Pensions on 16 July. He positioned himself as a "main street doctor" with a range of experience. The committee voted to approve Christine's nomination on 24 July. The Senate voted to confirm Christine in a 51–47 vote along party lines on 8 October. The position also came with an appointment as a four-star admiral in the U.S. Public Health Service Commissioned Corps. He was ceremonially sworn in by Secretary of Health and Human Services Robert F. Kennedy Jr. on 15 December.

As the assistant secretary for health, Christine has advocated for the Department of Health and Human Services to establish an Office of Men's Health. He sought to block federal funding for gender transition care. Christine led the United States federal government's response to the MV Hondius hantavirus outbreak.

== Views ==
=== Domestic issues ===
In his campaign for the Alabama Senate in 2022, Christine stated that he was "fiscally responsible" and advocated for libertarian conservatism. He supported school choice and opposed single-payer healthcare. Christine opposes abortion and was among several doctors who demonstrated outside the Supreme Court Building amid oral arguments in Dobbs v. Jackson Women's Health Organization (2022). He supported Alabama's abortion law, which offered no exclusion for rape or incest.

Amid the COVID-19 pandemic, Christine stated that the pandemic was used to affect the outcome of the 2020 presidential election. He suggested that "multinational large corporations and conglomerates", the financier George Soros, and the World Economic Forum sought to intentionally close small businesses in the pandemic. In a podcast, Christine stated that he had received the COVID-19 vaccine, but not successive booster doses. He opposed vaccine mandates. Christine compared the Biden administration's response to the pandemic to Nazi Germany. He supported a call from the conservative political activist Charlie Kirk to contest the results of the 2020 presidential election.

=== Transgender issues ===
Christine is critical of gender-affirming surgery and hormone manipulation. In 2021, he wrote that gender could not be changed in an article for Yellowhammer News, adding that doctors and nurses who practice medical techniques to conform to gender identity were going against their "conscience". Christine opposes transgender people in sports. He stated that, while he believed that gender dysphoria was a legitimate condition, it should be treated with corrective care, rather than affirming care.

Government offices
Preceded by Rachel Levine	Assistant Secretary for Health; 2025–present	Incumbent
