= Ryan K. Buchanan =

American lawyer

Ryan Buchanan
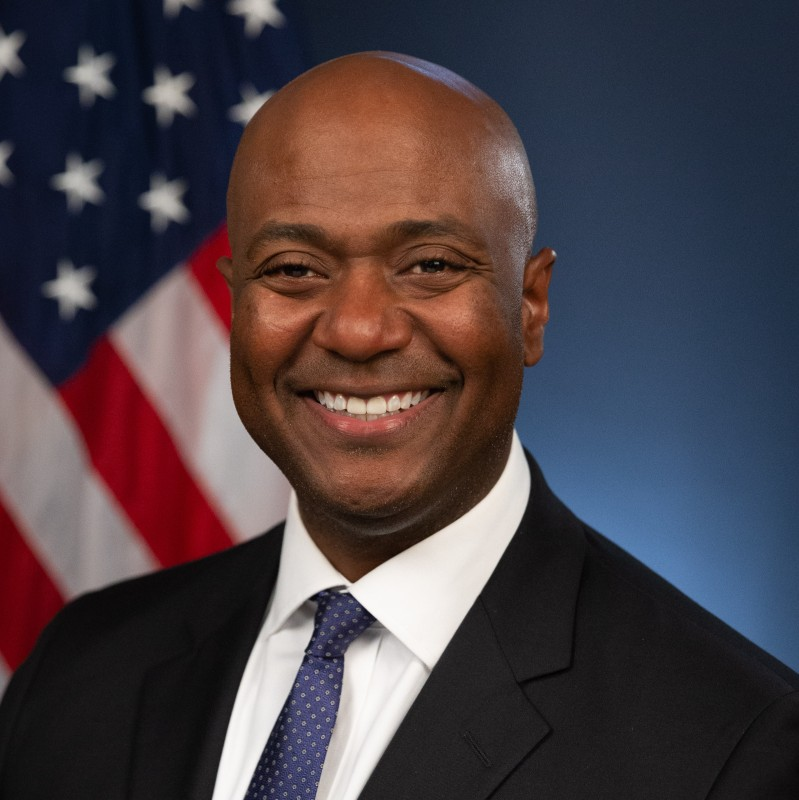

United States Attorney for the Northern District of Georgia
- In office May 2, 2022 – January 19, 2025
- President: Joe Biden
- Preceded by: B. J. Pak
- Succeeded by: Theodore S. Hertzberg

Personal details
- Born: Ryan Karim Buchanan
- Education: Samford University (BA); Vanderbilt University (JD)

Ryan Karim Buchanan is an American lawyer who served as the United States attorney for the Northern District of Georgia from 2022 to 2025.

== Education ==
Buchanan earned a Bachelor of Science from Samford University in 2001 and a Juris Doctor the Vanderbilt University Law School in 2005.

== Career ==
In 2005 and 2006, Buchanan served as a law clerk for Judge Inge Prytz Johnson of the United States District Court for the Northern District of Alabama. From 2006 to 2010, he was an associate at McGuireWoods. He joined the United States Attorney's Office for the Northern District of Georgia in 2010.

Buchanan resumed private practice at McGuireWoods, in March 2025, as the managing partner of its Atlanta office, following his January resignation from public office.

=== U.S. attorney for the Northern District of Georgia ===
On November 12, 2021, President Joe Biden announced his intent to nominate Buchanan to serve as the United States attorney for the Northern District of Georgia. On officeNovember 15, 2021, his nomination was sent to the United States Senate. On January 13, 2022, his nomination was reported out of the Senate Judiciary Committee. On April 27, 2022, his nomination was confirmed in the Senate by voice vote. He was sworn into office on May 2, 2022. He resigned on January 19, 2025, returning to McGuireWoods.

Legal offices
| Preceded by Kurt Erskine; Acting | United States Attorney for the Northern District of Georgia; 2022–2025 | Succeeded by Richard S. Moultrie Jr. Acting |
