= Stuart Risch =

U.S. Army general

Stuart W. Risch
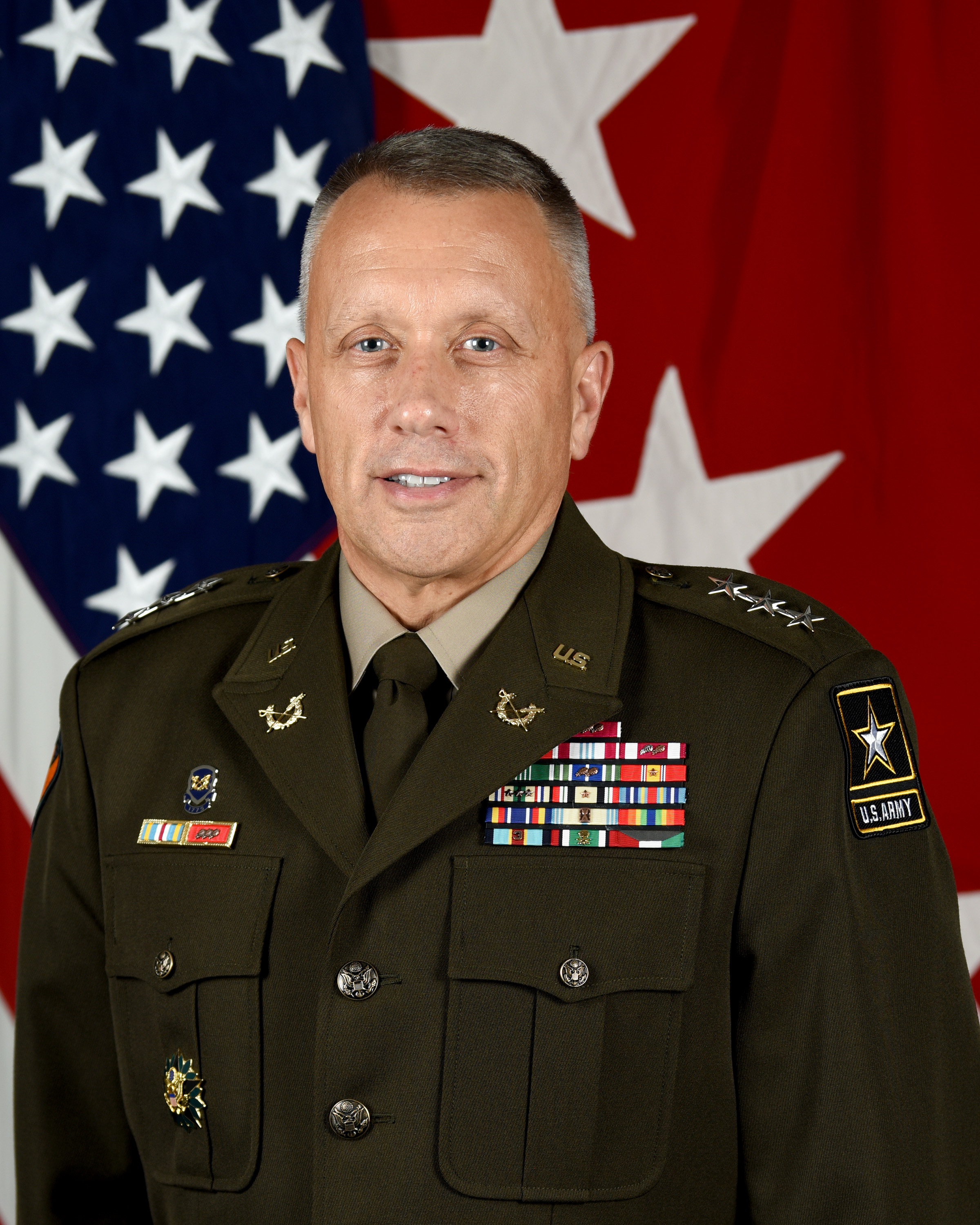
- Official portrait, 2021
- Alma mater: Lafayette College (BA); Seton Hall University (JD)
- Military career
- Allegiance: United States
- Branch: United States Army
- Service years: 1984–2024
- Rank: Lieutenant General
- Commands: Judge Advocate General of the United States Army; United States Army Legal Services Agency

Stuart W. Risch is a retired United States Army lieutenant general who last served as the 41st Judge Advocate General of the United States Army. He was previously the Deputy Judge Advocate General of the United States Army and before that the commanding general of the United States Army Legal Services Agency.

== Early life and education ==
Raised in Orange and West Orange, New Jersey, Risch graduated from the Newark Academy in 1980. He received his Bachelor of Arts in government, law and history from Lafayette College in 1984. Risch participated in Lafayette's Reserve Officers' Training Corps program and was commissioned as a field artillery officer the same year. He received his Juris Doctor from Seton Hall University School of Law in 1987. While in law school, he was a platoon leader, executive officer and company commander in the 78th Infantry Division, U.S. Army Reserve. He entered active duty service as a member of the Judge Advocate General's Corps in 1988.

== Career ==
He received his LL.M. degree from The Judge Advocate General's Legal Center and School in 1996. He also completed a master's degree in strategic studies at the Army War College in 2007.

In June 2021, he was nominated for promotion to lieutenant general and assigned to replace Charles N. Pede as the Judge Advocate General of the US Army. He assumed his present rank on July 12, 2021, with his promotion ceremony taking place on July 16, 2021.

Military offices
Preceded by ???	Commanding General and Commandant of The Judge Advocate General's Legal Center and School; 2014–2015	Succeeded by Charles N. Pede
Preceded by ???	Assistant Judge Advocate General for Military Law and Operations of the United States Army; 2015–2016	Succeeded by Charles N. Pede
Preceded by Paul S. Wilson	Commanding General of the United States Army Legal Services Agency; 2016–2017	Succeeded by Joseph B. Berger III
Preceded by Thomas E. Ayres	Deputy Judge Advocate General of the United States Army; 2017–2021	Succeeded by Joseph B. Berger III
Preceded by Charles N. Pede	Judge Advocate General of the United States Army; 2021–2024	Succeeded by Joseph B. Berger III
