= Flora Darpino =

United States Army general (b. 1961)

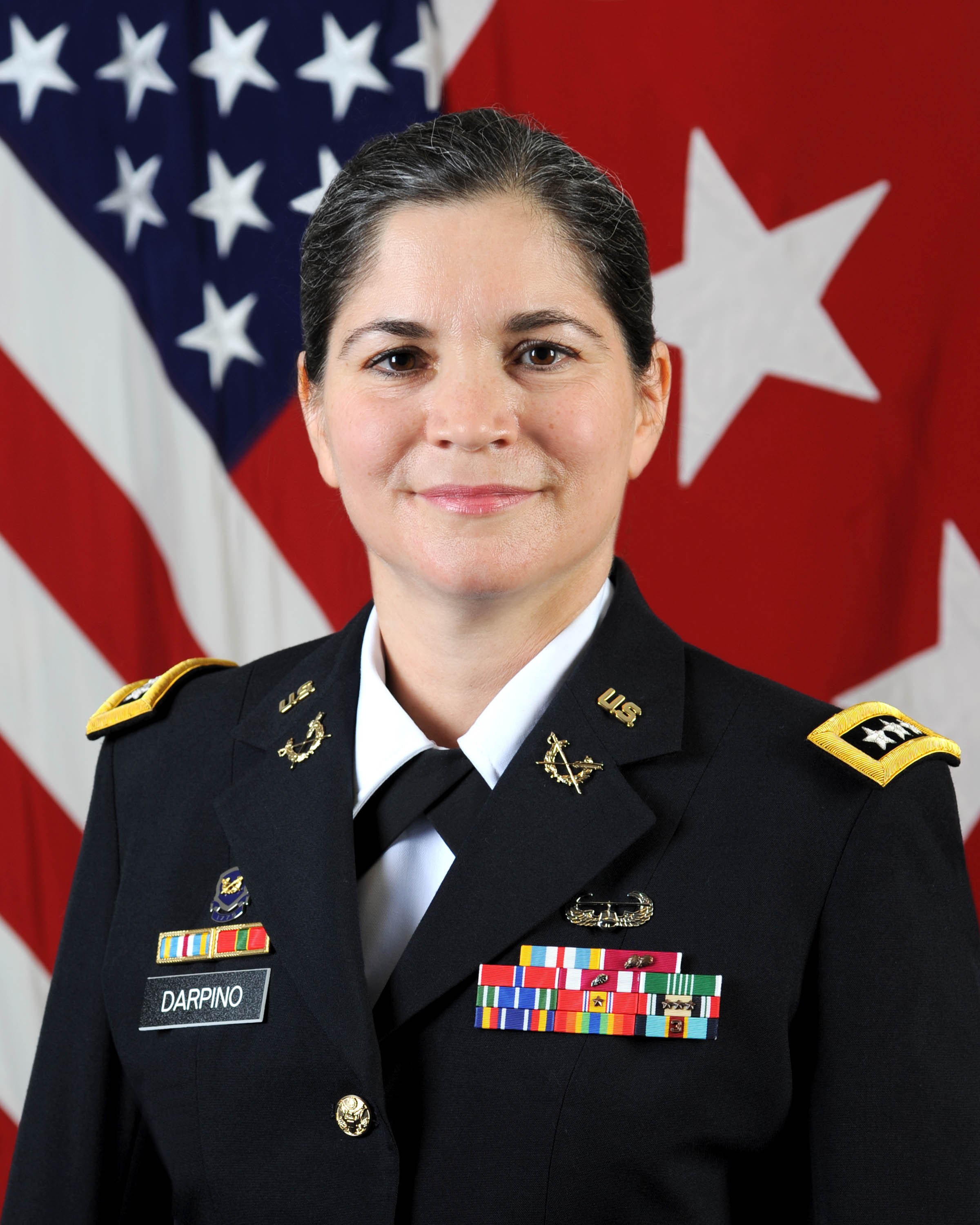
- Official portrait, 2013
- Born: Flora Diana Darpino; 1961 (age 64–65)
- Education: Gettysburg College (BA); Rutgers University (JD); The Judge Advocate General's Legal Center and School (LLM)
- Military career
- Allegiance: United States
- Branch: United States Army
- Service years: 1987–2017
- Rank: Lieutenant General
- Commands: Judge Advocate General of the United States Army; The Judge Advocate General's Legal Center and School; United States Army Legal Services Agency
- Conflicts: Iraq War
- Awards: Army Distinguished Service Medal; Defense Superior Service Medal; Legion of Merit (4); Bronze Star Medal

Flora Diana Darpino (born 1961) is a retired United States Army lieutenant general and military lawyer who was the 39th Judge Advocate General of the United States Army. She was the first woman to hold that position, which she held from September 4, 2013, to July 14, 2017.

== Education ==
Darpino graduated with a Bachelor of Arts from Gettysburg College in Pennsylvania, and received her Juris Doctor from Rutgers Law School in Camden, New Jersey, in 1986. She later received a Master of Laws in military law from The Judge Advocate General's Legal Center and School. She is a member of the New Jersey and Pennsylvania Bars.

== Career ==
Darpino received a direct commission into the United States Army Judge Advocate General's Corps in January 1987. Her first assignment was to VII Corps in Stuttgart, Germany, where she was a trial defense counsel and chief of the civil law division.

She was later the training officer and assistant operations officer for the United States Army Trial Defense Service; litigation attorney, litigation division, United States Army Legal Services Agency; chief, Administrative Law, 101st Airborne Division (Air Assault) at Fort Campbell, Kentucky; assistant executive officer, Office of The Judge Advocate General; chief, Judge Advocate Recruiting Office; staff judge advocate, 4th Infantry Division at Fort Hood, Texas and Tikrit, Iraq; deputy staff judge advocate, III Corps at Fort Hood; chief, Criminal Law Division, OTJAG; staff judge advocate, V Corps, in Heidelberg, Germany; and staff judge advocate, United States Forces – Iraq, in Baghdad, Iraq. She served as the commander of the United States Army Legal Services Agency, Fort Belvoir, Virginia, and as the commander of the Judge Advocate General's Legal Center and School.

== Awards and decorations ==
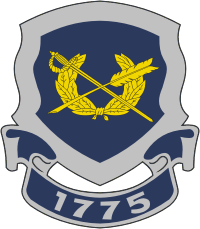
Air Assault Badge
Army Staff Identification Badge
4th Infantry Division Combat Service Identification Badge
Judge Advocate General's Corps, United States Army Distinctive Unit Insignia
2 Overseas Service Bars

Army Distinguished Service Medal
Defense Superior Service Medal
Legion of Merit with three bronze oak leaf clusters
Bronze Star Medal
Meritorious Service Medal with silver oak leaf cluster
Army Commendation Medal
Army Achievement Medal
Joint Meritorious Unit Award
Superior Unit Award
National Defense Service Medal with one bronze service star
Iraq Campaign Medal with three service stars
Global War on Terrorism Service Medal
Army Service Ribbon
Army Overseas Service Ribbon with bronze award numeral 3

== Personal life ==
Darpino is married with two daughters.

Military offices
Preceded by Dana K. Chipman	Judge Advocate General of the United States Army; 2013–2017	Succeeded by Charles N. Pede
