= Charles Pede =

United States Army general

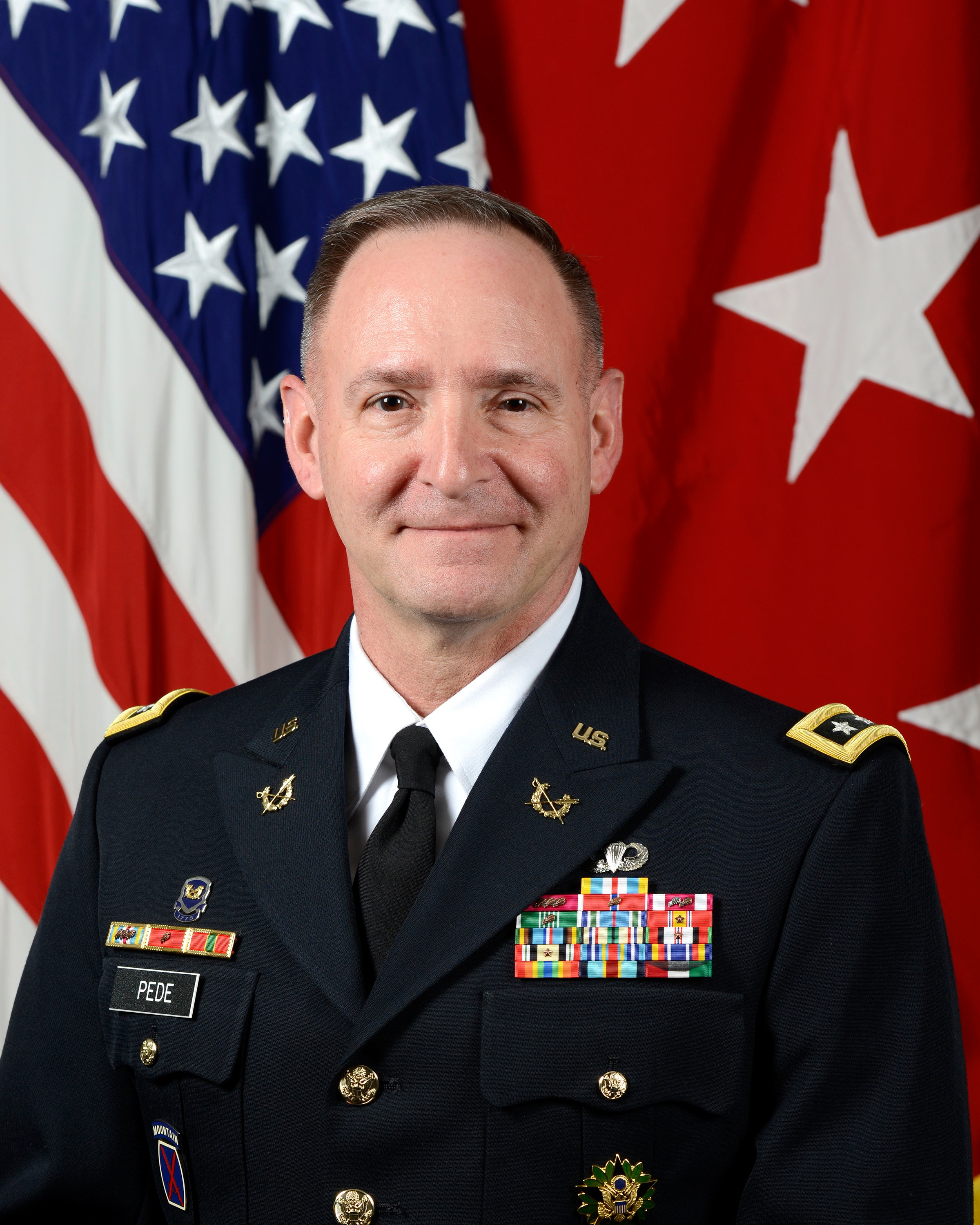
- Official portrait, 2017
- Born: Charles Nicholas Pede
- Education: University of Virginia (BA, JD); United States Army Command and General Staff College; Industrial College of the Armed Forces
- Military career
- Allegiance: United States
- Branch: United States Army
- Service years: 1984–2021
- Rank: Lieutenant General
- Commands: Judge Advocate General's Corps; The Judge Advocate General's Legal Center and School; United States Army Legal Services Agency
- Conflicts: Gulf War; War in Afghanistan; Iraq War
- Awards: Army Distinguished Service Medal; Defense Superior Service Medal; Legion of Merit (4); Bronze Star Medal (2)

Charles Nicholas Pede is a military lawyer and retired United States Army lieutenant general who last served as the 40th Judge Advocate General of the United States Army. Pede was promoted from the rank of brigadier general to the rank of lieutenant general, bypassing the rank of major general on July 26, 2017.

He retired from the Army on July 9, 2021.

== Education ==
Pede graduated from the University of Virginia and received a commission through Reserve Officers' Training Corps. He then graduated with his Juris Doctor from the University of Virginia School of Law, and attended The Judge Advocate General's Legal Center and School at the University of Virginia. He later attended the United States Army Command and General Staff College, and the Industrial College of the Armed Forces.

== Military career ==
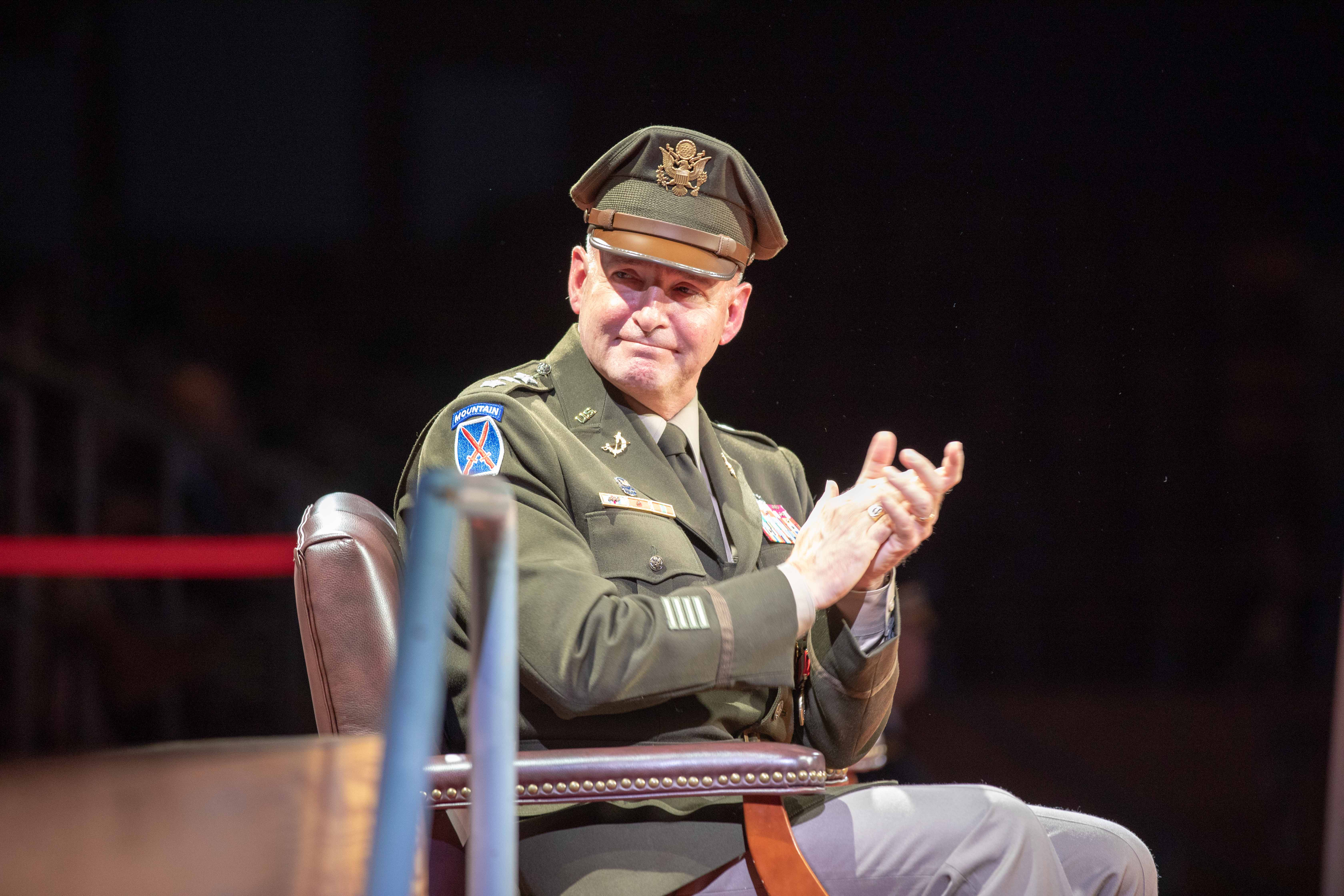
Lt. Gen. Pede at his retirement ceremony, July 9, 2021.

Pede's assignments include: Trial Defense Counsel, Mannheim Field Office, Germany; Chief, Criminal Law, and Chief, Administrative & International Law, 21st Theater Army Area Command, Mannheim, Germany and Army Forces-Turkey; Chief, Military Justice, 10th Mountain Division (Light Infantry), Fort Drum, New York and Operation Restore Hope, Mogadishu, Somalia; Professor of Law, Criminal Law Department, The Judge Advocate General's Legal Center and School, Charlottesville, Virginia; Assignments Officer, Office of The Judge Advocate General; Assistant Executive Officer, Office of The Judge Advocate General, Washington, DC; Staff Judge Advocate, 10th Mountain Division (Light Infantry), Fort Drum, New York and Joint Task Force Mountain and Combined Joint Task Force-180, Operation Enduring Freedom, Afghanistan; Legislative Counsel, Office of the Chief of Legislative Liaison, Pentagon, Washington, DC; Chief, Criminal Law Division, OTJAG; Staff Judge Advocate, United States Forces Iraq, Baghdad, Operation Iraqi Freedom, Iraq; Chief, Criminal Law Division, OTJAG; Executive Officer to The Judge Advocate General of the Army, Washington, DC; and Commander, United States Army Legal Services Agency and Chief Judge, United States Army Court of Criminal Appeals, Fort Belvoir, Virginia.

Brigadier General Pede assumed command of the Judge Advocate General’s Legal Center and School in Charlottesville, Virginia on March 13, 2015. In 2017, he was nominated for promotion to Lieutenant General and for service as the Judge Advocate General of the Army.

== Awards ==
Pede's awards include the Army Distinguished Service Medal, Defense Superior Service Medal, the Legion of Merit with three oak leaf clusters, the Bronze Star Medal with oak leaf cluster, and the Meritorious Service Medal with six oak leaf clusters. He is also entitled to wear the Parachutist Badge and the Army Staff Identification Badge.

== Personal life ==
Pede is married and has one son.

== Read more ==
- Timothy J. Bilecki

Military offices
Preceded by Stuart W. Risch	Commanding General and Commandant of The Judge Advocate General's Legal Center and School; 2015–2016	Succeeded by Paul S. Wilson
Preceded by Stuart W. Risch	Assistant Judge Advocate General for Military Law and Operations of the United States Army; 2016–2017	Succeeded by Susan K. Escallier
Preceded by Flora D. Darpino	Judge Advocate General of the United States Army; 2017–2021	Succeeded by Stuart W. Risch
