= Joseph B. Berger III =

U.S. Army general officer

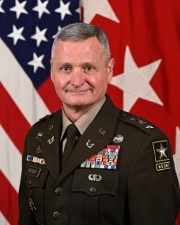
- Official portrait, 2024
- Born: c. 1970 (age 55–56)
- Military career
- Allegiance: United States
- Branch: United States Army
- Service years: 1992–2025
- Rank: Lieutenant General
- Commands: Judge Advocate General of the United States Army; Judge Advocate General's Legal Center and School; United States Army Legal Services Agency
- Awards: Distinguished Service Medal; Legion of Merit (5); Bronze Star Medal (4)

Joseph B. Berger III is a retired United States Army lieutenant general who last served as the 42nd Judge Advocate General of the United States Army from 15 July 2024 to 21 February 2025. He had previously served as the Deputy Judge Advocate General of the United States Army and had served as the commanding general and commandant of the Judge Advocate General's Legal Center and School. He also previously served as the senior legal advisor for the Joint Special Operations Command, the U.S. Army Cyber Command, and the 160th Special Operations Aviation Regiment.

In May 2024, Berger was nominated for promotion to lieutenant general and assignment as the 42d Judge Advocate General of the United States Army.

In February 2025 Berger was dismissed from his post without notice by the Secretary of Defense, Pete Hegseth, along with the Judge Advocate General of the U.S. Air Force, Lt.Gen Charles L. Plummer, in violation of the governing statute, 10 U.S.C. § 7037. The Secretary later publicly stated he fired the top military lawyers because he didn't want them to "attempt to be roadblocks to anything that happens." Berger's dismissal was part of a broader removal of senior U.S. Military officers by the Second Trump administration referred to as the "Friday Night Massacre."

On Secretary of Defense Pete Hegseth's personal recommendation, on June 30, 2025, President Trump personally approved Berger's retirement as a Lieutenant General, finding his firing involved "exceptional or unusual circumstances" and that "no potentially adverse or adverse" information existed.

Military offices
Preceded by Stuart Risch	Commanding General of the United States Army Legal Services Agency; 2017–2019	Succeeded by Susan K. Escallier
Preceded by Robert P. Huston	Commanding General and Commandant of the Judge Advocate General's Legal Center and School; 2019–2021	Succeeded by Alison C. Martin
Preceded by Stuart Risch	Deputy Judge Advocate General of the United States Army; 2021–2024	Succeeded by Robert A. Borcherding
Preceded by Stuart Risch	Judge Advocate General of the United States Army; 2024–2025	Succeeded by Bobby Christine
