= Charles L. Plummer =

U.S. Air Force general

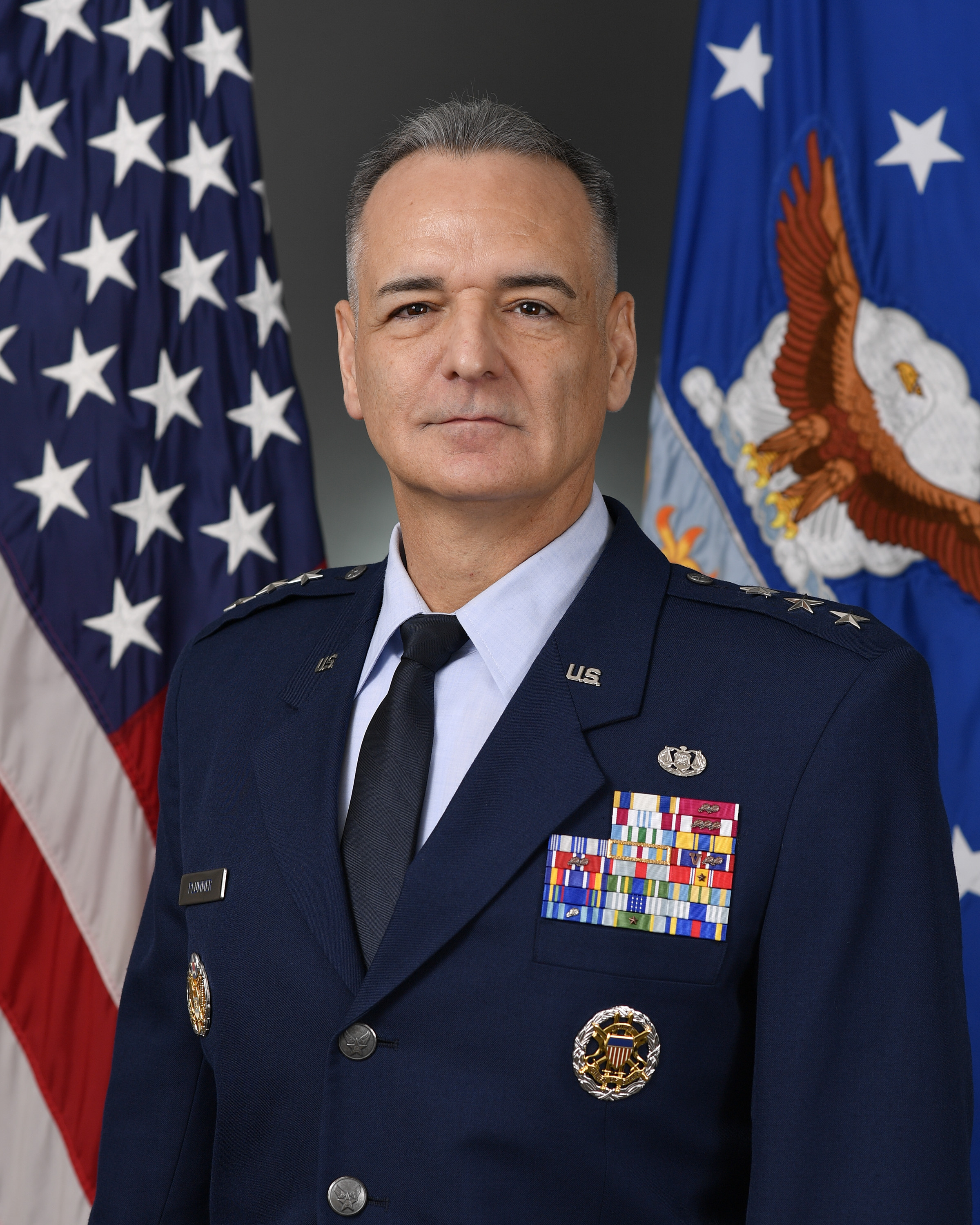
- Official portrait, 2022
- Military career
- Allegiance: United States
- Branch: United States Air Force
- Service years: 1995–2025
- Rank: Lieutenant General
- Nickname: Chuck
- Commands: United States Air Force Judge Advocate General's Corps; Air Force Legal Operations Agency
- Awards: Air Force Distinguished Service Medal; Legion of Merit (3)

Charles L. Plummer is a retired United States Air Force lieutenant general who served as the Judge Advocate General of the United States Air Force and Space Force from 2022 to 2025. He previously served as the deputy judge advocate general of the United States Air Force from 2018 to 2022.

In 2025 Plummer was dismissed from his post by Secretary of Defense, Pete Hegseth, alongside the dismissal of The 42d Judge Advocate General of the U.S. Army, LTG Joseph B. Berger III. The dismissal of Plummer was part of a wider removal of senior U.S. military officers by the second Trump administration.

Military offices
Preceded by Jeffrey A. Rockwell	Commander of the Air Force Legal Operations Agency; 2016–2018	Succeeded by Sharon A. Shaffer
Preceded by Jeffrey A. Rockwell	Deputy Judge Advocate General of the United States Air Force; 2018–2022	Succeeded by Rebecca Vernon
Preceded by Jeffrey A. Rockwell	Judge Advocate General of the United States Air Force; 2022–2025	Succeeded by Rebecca Vernon; Acting
