= Ruthie Davis =

American designer and entrepreneur

Ruthie Davis is an independent American female designer and entrepreneur known for her eponymous brand Ruthie Davis. Her designs are endorsed and worn by fashion icons such as Lady Gaga, Beyoncé, Zendaya, and Ariana Grande.

She was named “The Queen of Footwear” by Bella magazine.

== Early life and education ==
Growing up in Connecticut, Davis excelled in skiing and tennis. In 1980, she graduated with honours from the Loomis Chaffee School, where she became the first girl ever to make the boys' ski team. In 1984, Davis graduated with a BA in English Lit and Visual Arts from Bowdoin College, (where she captained the tennis and squash teams).

Davis also developed communication, creative and entrepreneurial skills throughout her educational years by serving as the editor-in-chief for the Loomis Chaffee school yearbook, writing Bowdoin Orient’s “Mainely Health” column on ways to maintain a healthy lifestyle, and publishing Babson’s newsletter “MBA Communique” where she pursued an MBA in entrepreneurship from the F.W. Olin Graduate School of Business.

== Career ==
=== Early work ===
Davis worked as a sportswriter for the Hartford Courant and ESPN. In 1989, she started her first independent entrepreneurial venture in Vermont, a hybrid fitness business that combined a workout studio and a sports gear store.

=== Corporate career ===
Davis transitioned into the footwear industry by joining Reebok as an Associate Product Manager. She became director of the Reebok Classic division in four years. There, she reimagined the sports brand as a fashion staple, adding colored bottoms and unconventional materials to the classic white sneakers.

After leaving Reebok, Davis served in multiple executive positions at major fashion brands. As VP of Marketing and Design at UGG Australia in the early 2000s, she championed a campaign to transform the public's vision of UGG boots. It was Davis's work that helped UGG enter the fashion scene with their fleece-lined boots known for functionality. UGGs were then “one of the most popular statement pieces,” with major celebrities like Kim Kardashian and Paris Hilton caught wearing them in paparazzi shots.

An offer to work at Tommy Hilfiger as the VP of Marketing and Design for Women's Footwear brought Davis from California to New York. Having accumulated years of experience in footwear design, Davis determined that it was time to launch her own brand in 2006, the eponymous Ruthie Davis.

=== The brand ===
A typical Ruthie Davis shoe has been described as “clean, minimal, functional, sleek, sexy.” Her designs often reference architecture, modernism, future technology, and her passion for ‘60s Italian cinema.

Featured in global retailer establishments including Neiman Marcus and Harvey Nichols and on top-tier magazines like Vogue and Elle, within a few years the Ruthie Davis brand gained an international reputation. A-list celebrities such as Lady Gaga and Beyoncé ordered custom shoes for their red-carpet events. It was Ruthie Davis’s SS19 collection that Lady Gaga wore to the A Star Is Born premiere.

The Ruthie Davis brand is recognized for its many collaborations. One of its most notable is the Disney x Ruthie Davis collection, which debuted on January 15, 2017. The first collection was inspired by Snow White in celebration of the Disney franchise’s 80th anniversary. This collection included eight styles, including sneakers, booties, and stiletto sandals. In the following years, she reimagined a series of Disney princess franchises in the collection, from Cinderella to Frozen to Mulan. This long-standing collaboration eventually involved all eleven Disney princesses. In 2019 at the American Image Awards, she and Disney were awarded Collaboration of the Year by the American Apparel & Footwear Association.

The “One People” sneaker was designed collectively by Ruthie Davis, DEVIATE, and BGCSM (Boys and Girls Club of Southeastern Michigan) youth designers. In 2015, Davis was recognized for her collaboration with designer and animal activist John Bartlett on a vegan shoe line, for which they were nominated for the WGSN Global Fashion Collaboration Award.

Davis pulled out of her retailer relationships to shift her brand to a direct-to-consumer e-commerce model in 2020. Focusing on social media engagement, the brand has a following of 400k on Instagram and 150k on Facebook.

=== Outside the brand ===
Davis has served as a fashion expert on mainstream TV and podcast channels, such as Bravo, E!, Bloomberg, CNBC, Fox News, and Yahoo Finance.

She has also been involved in education. She has taught several courses at the Fashion Institute of Technology in New York and the University of Delaware. She serves on the University of Delaware’s Fashion Advisory Board, the Loomis Chaffee Head Council, the New Britain Museum of American Art's Education Committee, and the Scholarship Program Selection Committee of the Council of Fashion Designers of America.

== Awards and coverage ==
- American Apparel & Footwear Association, Footwear Designer of the Year, 2014
- American Apparel & Footwear Association, Collaboration of the Year, 2019
- Council of Fashion Designers of America, Accredited Member, since 2014
- WGSN Global Fashion Awards, Global Fashion Collaboration Award (nomination w/ John Bartlett), 2015
- Babson College, Entrepreneur Hall of Fame, 2015
- Acquisitions International, Fashion Footwear Designer of the Year, 2016
- FashInvest NYC, Fashpreneur Award, 2016
- Goldman Sachs, 100 Most Intriguing Entrepreneurs, 2013
- Footwear News, 20 Directional Design Stars, 2013 and 2014
