= Timothy J. Bilecki =

American Army lawyer

- Education: Boston College (BS) University of Miami School of Law (JD) Babson College (MBA)
- Occupation: Attorney
- Employer(s): Bilecki Law Group, PLLC
- Military career
- Allegiance: United States
- Branch: United States Army
- Service years: 2003–2010
- Rank: Major
- Unit: Judge Advocate General's Corps
- Known for: Court-martial defense
- Awards: Meritorious Service Medal (2); Overseas Service Ribbon; Global War on Terrorism Expeditionary Medal; Joint Service Achievement Medal

Timothy J. Bilecki is an American attorney and former United States Army judge-advocate who served with the rank of major. He served in the Army from 2003 to 2010 and later practiced law in Honolulu and Tampa, representing service members in military criminal cases.

== Education ==
Bilecki earned a Bachelor of Science in finance from Boston College in 1999 and a Juris Doctor from the University of Miami School of Law in 2002. He was admitted to The Florida Bar in 2002. He earned a Master of Business Administration from Babson College in 2022.

== Career ==
Bilecki served as a judge-advocate in the United States Army from January 2003 to June 2010, leaving active duty with the rank of major. His assignments included the Trial Defense Service at Fort Hood, service as a Special Assistant United States Attorney in Honolulu; and defense counsel positions at Camp Casey and Yongsan in South Korea.

In 2009, Bilecki represented the U.S. Army soldier charged with attempted murder following a stabbing outside a nightclub in Seoul's Itaewon district. The soldier was acquitted. Bilecki argued that investigators had identified the wrong suspect.

In February 2010, Bilecki represented a soldier on Okinawa charged with using Spice, a synthetic cannabis product. A military judge dismissed four Article 92 specifications, finding the Army's prohibition insufficiently specific. Prosecutors later withdrew the remaining charge, and the Army subsequently adopted a more specific Spice policy.

After leaving the Army, Bilecki established a law practice in Honolulu in 2010 and moved it to Tampa in 2021.

In 2012, Bilecki represented Marine Sergeant Benjamin Johns, who was acquitted of hazing-related charges involving Lance Corporal Harry Lew, who had died by suicide in Afghanistan.

In 2017, Bilecki criticized Naval Criminal Investigative Service undercover operations on Okinawa. That year, he represented Navy Lieutenant Stephen Kimball, who was acquitted of five charges arising from an NCIS sting operation.

In April 2026, Bilecki represented Air Force Captain Jacob R. Wulfson at a court-martial at RAF Lakenheath in England. Wulfson was acquitted of two sexual-assault charges but convicted of strangulation and disobeying an order. He was sentenced to six months' confinement, a reprimand, and dismissal from the Air Force.

== Awards ==
Award	Awarding organization	Year
Joint Service Achievement Medal	Joint Task Force – Balikatan, Philippines	2008
Global War on Terrorism Expeditionary Medal	United States Army	2008
Meritorious Service Medal	United States Army Pacific	2008
Overseas Service Ribbon	United States Army	2008
Meritorious Service Medal	United States Army Trial Defense Service	2010
