= Babson College =

Business school in Wellesley, Massachusetts, US

- Former name: Babson Institute (1919–1969)
- Type: Private business school
- Established: September 3, 1919; 107 years ago
- Endowment: $811.5 million (2025)
- President: Stephen Spinelli Jr.
- Faculty: 206 full-time, 91 part-time
- Students: 3,932 (fall 2024)
- Undergraduates: 2,793 (fall 2024)
- Postgraduates: 1,139 (fall 2024)
- Location: Wellesley, Massachusetts, US; 42°17′53.63″N 71°15′40.29″W
- Campus: Suburban, 350 acres (1.4 km^{2})
- Colors: Green and white
- Nickname: Beavers
- Sporting affiliations: NCAA Division III - NEWMAC, Little East
- Mascot: Biz E. Beaver
- Website: babson.edu

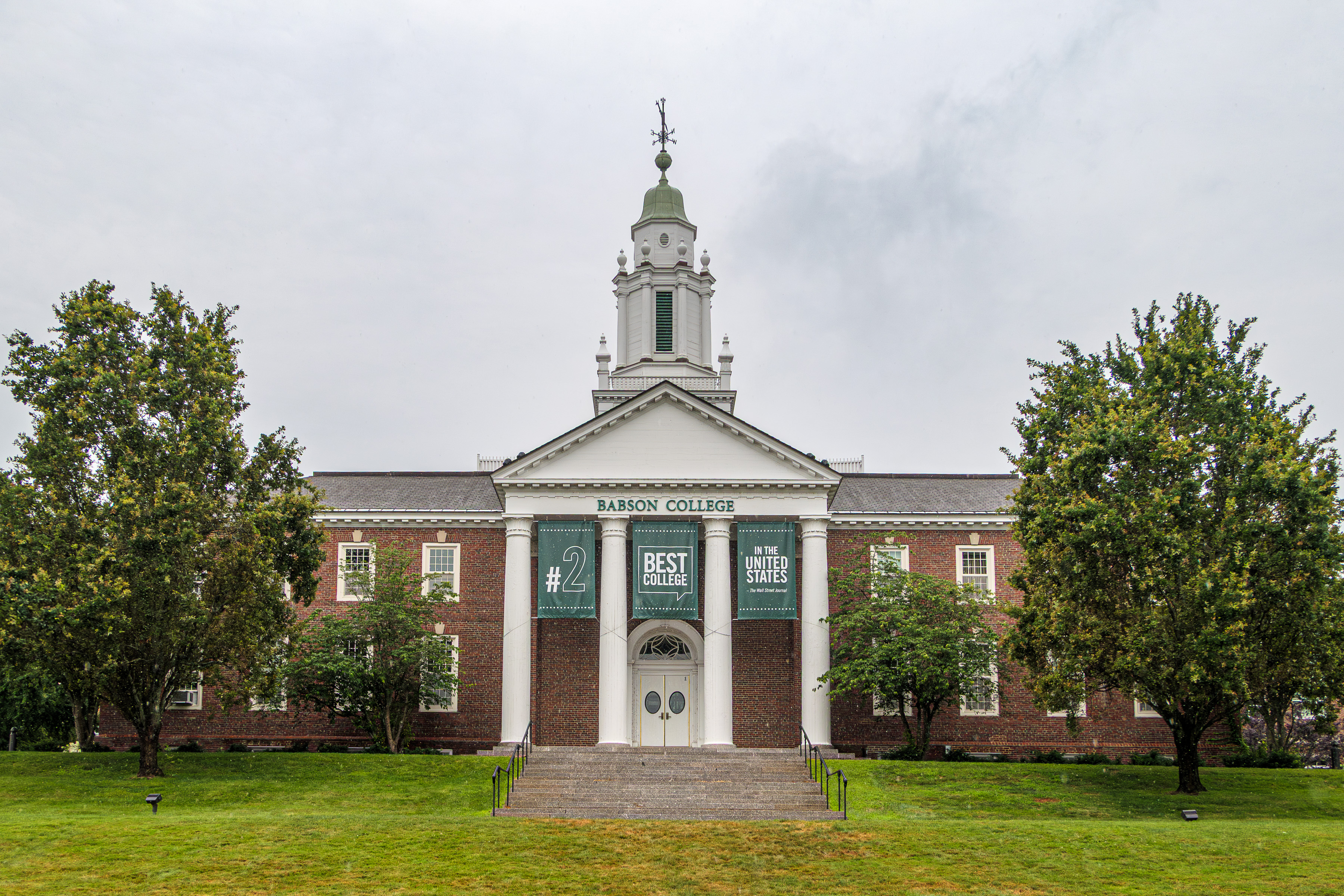
Tomasso Hall

Babson College is a private business school in Wellesley, Massachusetts, United States specializing in entrepreneurship education. Founded in 1919 by Roger Babson, the college was established as the Babson Institute in his Wellesley home and initially granted one-year certificates. Babson College earned degree-granting authority from the Commonwealth of Massachusetts in 1947.

== History ==
Early Babson Institute

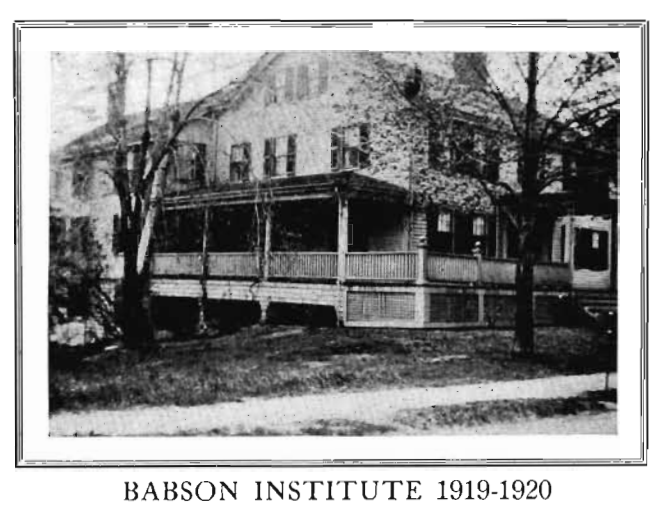
1919–1920: Original location at Roger and Grace Babson's former home on Abbott Road

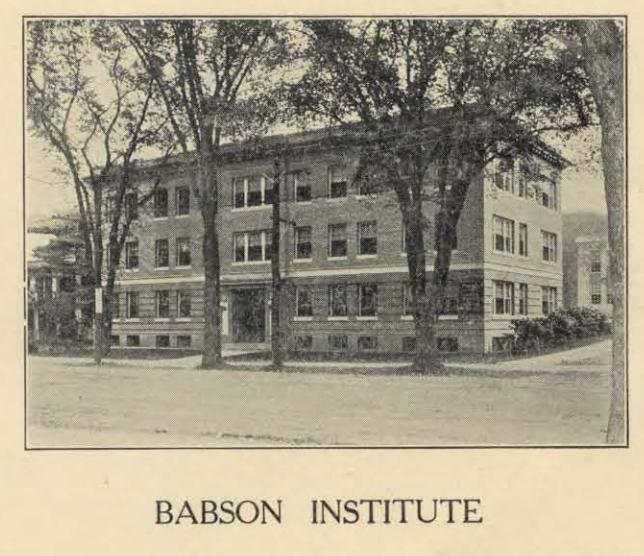
1920–1922: Second location on Washington Street

=== 20th century ===
In the fall of 1908, Roger W. Babson met Sidney Linnekin, a young carpenter from Gloucester, Massachusetts, who impressed him with his diligence while working on Babson's garage in Wellesley Hills. Their acquaintance led to a collaboration when Linnekin expressed interest in studying economics and bond salesmanship. Babson created a correspondence course in bond-selling, the first of its kind in the United States, which Linnekin later helped market and expand into a broader program in business education.

This initiative grew into a significant educational enterprise offering courses in economics, finance, and distribution, with Linnekin eventually serving as sales manager. The combination of Babson's collaboration with Linnekin and his experience at the LSE inspired the eventual founding of the Babson Institute.

On September 3, 1919, with an enrollment of twenty-seven students, the Babson Institute held its first classes in the former home of Roger and Grace Babson on Abbott Road in Wellesley Hills. The institute's curriculum focused on practical experience. Students observed manufacturing processes during field trips to area factories and businesses, and viewed industrial films on Saturday mornings.

The institute also maintained a business environment as part of the students' everyday life. Students kept regular business hours and were monitored by punching in and out on a time clock. They were assigned an office desk equipped with standard machines. Personal secretaries typed the students' assignments and correspondence in an effort to accurately reflect the business world. Roger Babson aimed to "prepare his students to enter their chosen careers as executives, not anonymous members of the work force."

In 1969, Babson converted its three-year Bachelor of Science in Business Administration degree into a four-year Bachelor of Science degree. That same year, the institute became a college, and women were admitted for the first time.

=== 21st century ===
Babson is involved in a three-college collaboration with Olin College and Wellesley College, often called BOW.

== Campus ==
=== Pre-1950 ===
Roger Babson purchased farmland in Wellesley, Massachusetts in 1921 to establish the permanent campus. This land became the foundation for the college's growth and development. The campus has grown to over 350 acres (140 ha) and is located in the Babson Park section of Wellesley, Massachusetts, fifteen miles west of Boston.

Babson began building its quadrangle with the construction of Babson Park Clubhouse (renamed Park Manor South) in 1925 and Park Manor Central in 1930. Babson built the Coleman Map Building in 1925 to house the "Great Relief Map". Built on a spherical surface to match the Earth's curvature, the map measured 63 by 46 feet (19 m × 14 m), covering 3,000 square feet (280 m^{2}).

== Newtonia ==
Babson is home to the Grace K. Babson Collection of Newtonia, the largest collection of Isaac Newton materials in the United States. A grove of trees grafted from a fourth-generation scion of Isaac Newton's apple tree were planted in 2005 on the north lawn of Tomasso Hall.

== Academics ==
=== Undergraduate admissions ===
In 2024, Babson College admitted 17% of undergraduate applicants, with admission standards considered exceptional, applicant competition considered very high, and with those admitted having an average 3.79 high school GPA. The school does not require submission of standardized test scores but they will be considered when submitted. For enrolled students, the middle 50% average of SAT and ACT scores, respectively, was 1450-1530 and 32-34.

=== Undergraduate program ===
Babson College offers a Bachelor of Science in Business Administration. Students can choose from 26 concentrations in business and other fields during their junior and senior years. Programs are accredited by the Association to Advance Collegiate Schools of Business (AACSB) and the college itself has been institutionally accredited by the New England Commission of Higher Education or its predecessor since 1950.

=== Graduate program ===
The F.W. Olin Graduate School of Business at Babson College offers a one-year MBA Program, a two-year MBA Program, a 42-month evening MBA Program and a blended learning MBA Program with campuses located in Boston and Miami. It also offers a Master's of Science in Entrepreneurial Leadership, Business Analytics, Finance, and a Certificate of Advanced Management.

=== Rankings and reputation ===
Academic rankings

National
- U.S. News & World Report: 1 (entrepreneurship)
- WSJ/College Pulse: 2

Business school rankings

United States
- Bloomberg MBA: 56
- USNWR MBA: 72

Global
- Financial Times MBA: 60

Babson's undergraduate school and MBA program have been ranked No. 1 by the U.S. News & World Report for entrepreneurship for several consecutive decades.

In 2025, Babson ranked No. 2 on The Wall Street Journal's best colleges in the U.S. list. It is the No. 1 business school on Forbes' list of colleges with the highest earning graduates. Babson is ranked the No. 1 business school for Return on Investment by PayScale's 2024 rankings. In that same ranking, Babson is ranked 28th nationally for Return on Investment. In 2022, a Georgetown University Center on Education and the Workforce study placed Babson No. 9 overall for return on investment both 30 and 40 years after enrollment.

Because Babson only offers programs in business administration, many publications do not include the college in their overall rankings.

== Student life ==
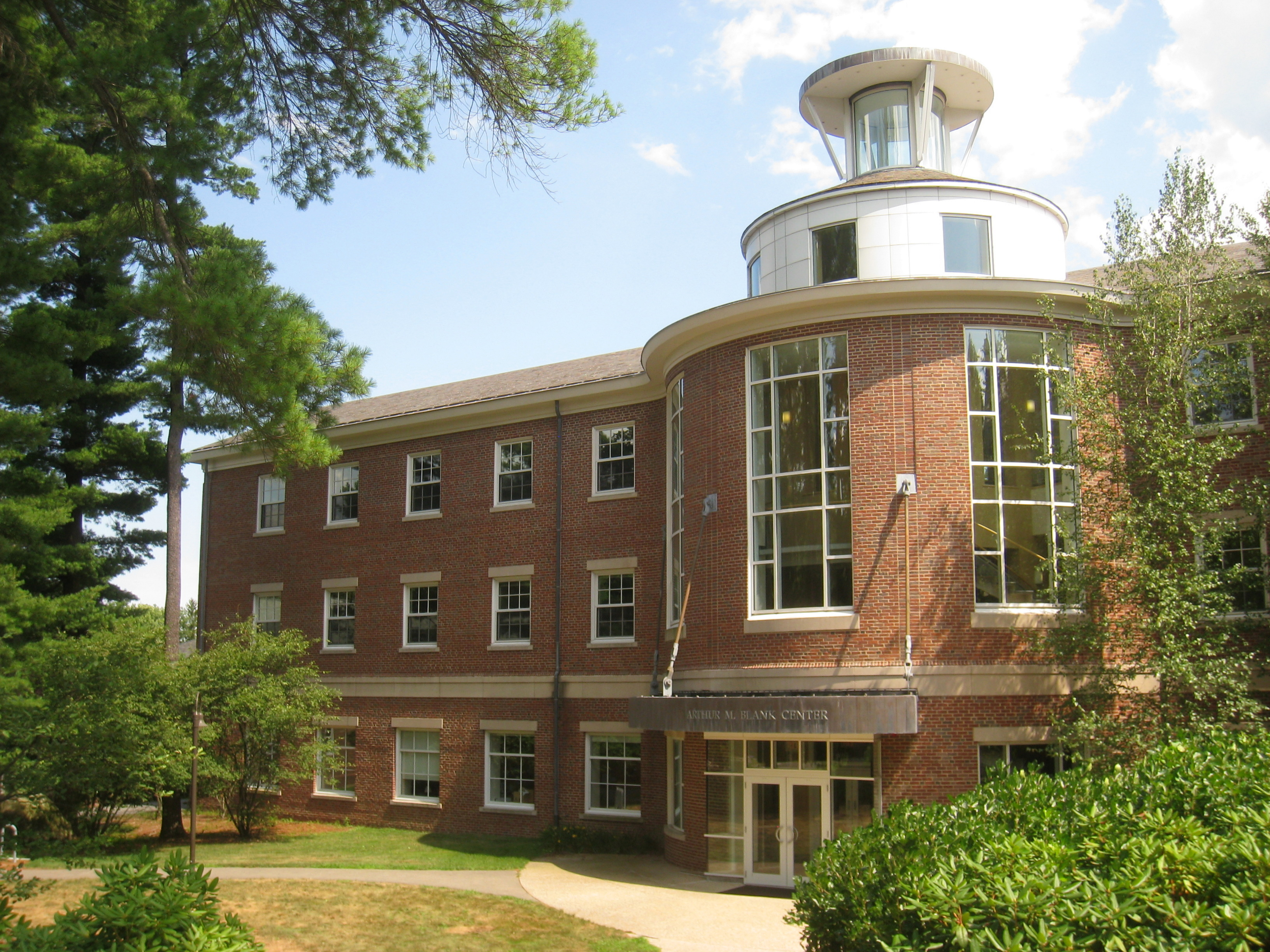
Arthur M. Blank Center

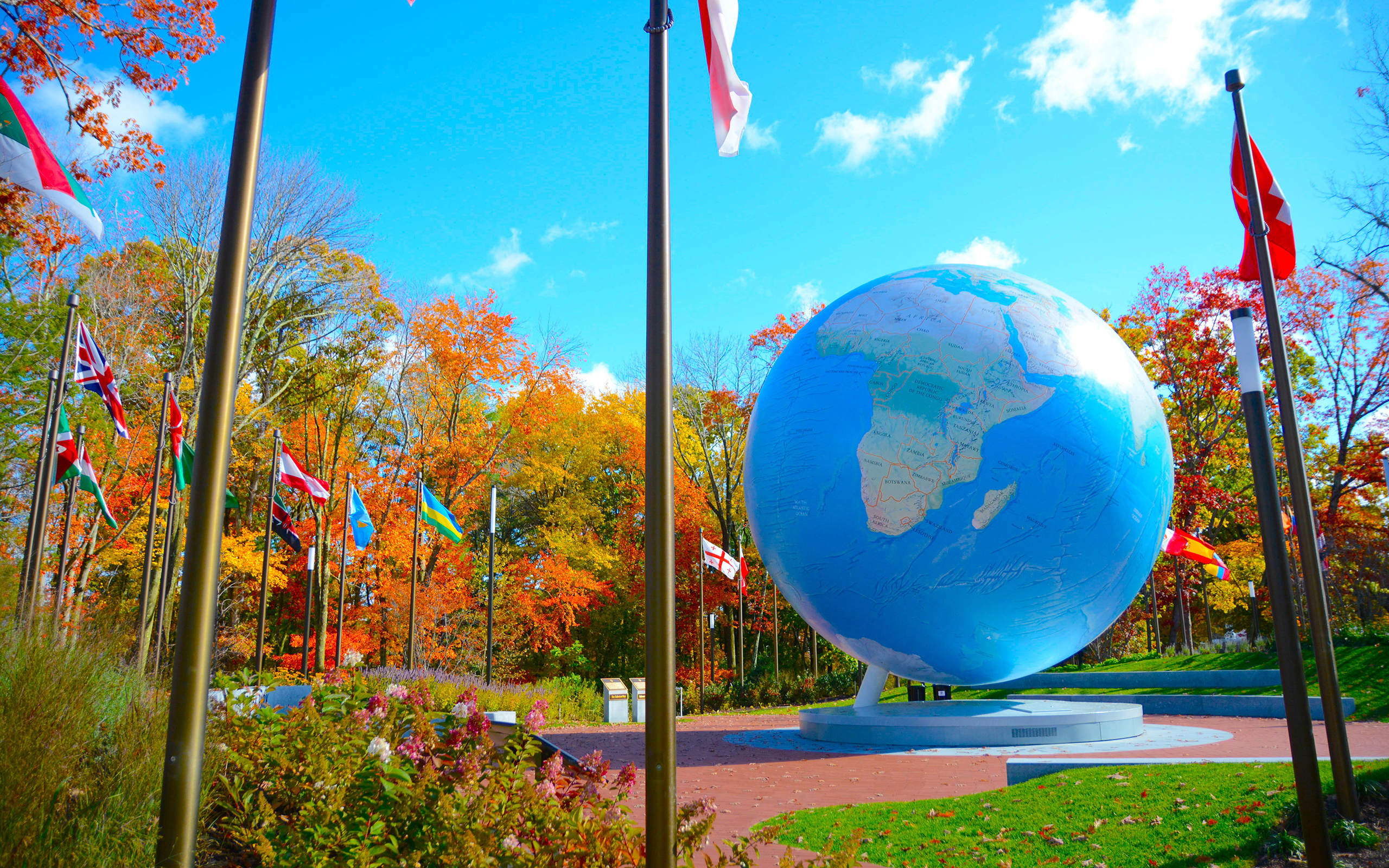
The Babson Globe

Student publications include a literary magazine and the Babson Built Podcast. Babson College Radio was started in 1998.

In 2020, the Foundation for Individual Rights and Expression ranked Babson among the 10 worst schools for free speech, alleging that the college had fired an adjunct professor because he posted on Facebook about Iran.

In addition to several fraternities and sororities on campus, Babson offers students with specific interests the chance to reside in Living-Learning Communities. A few of the special-interest communities include:

=== Community of Developers & Entrepreneurs (CODE) ===
CODE (Community of Developers & Entrepreneurs) was founded in Fall 2015 to support Babson students interested in the intersection of technology and business.

=== eTower ===
Founded in 2001 by Andrew Foley ’03 and housed in Van Winkle Hall, eTower was envisioned as a "living incubator" where student entrepreneurs could live, learn, and collaborate.

== Athletics ==
Babson athletics wordmark

Babson's teams are known as the "Beavers" and its colors are green and white. The school has 23 varsity sports teams, the majority of which compete in the New England Women's and Men's Athletic Conference (NEWMAC) of the NCAA Division III. Babson's Baseball team has won 7 Conference Championships and been to 5 NCAA Tournaments, including the 2019 College World Series. Additionally, the men's soccer team have won 3 NCAA National Championships, 27 NCAA tournaments wins and 12 conference championships. The men's and women's alpine ski teams compete in the United States Collegiate Ski and Snowboard Association (USCSA) and the men's lacrosse team competes in the Pilgrim League.

Babson College's men's hockey team competes in the Little East Conference and has won (1) NCAA D3 National title, (1) ECAC 2 title, six ECAC East Championships, appearing in the championship game in 12 of the last 20 seasons as of 2024. Babson College's men's golf team competes in the New England Collegiate Conference (NECC) and won the title in 2011. Babson United Rugby Club won Northeast region of NSCRO 7's in 2016. In 2017, Babson's men's basketball team won the Division III National Championship.

== Notable alumni ==
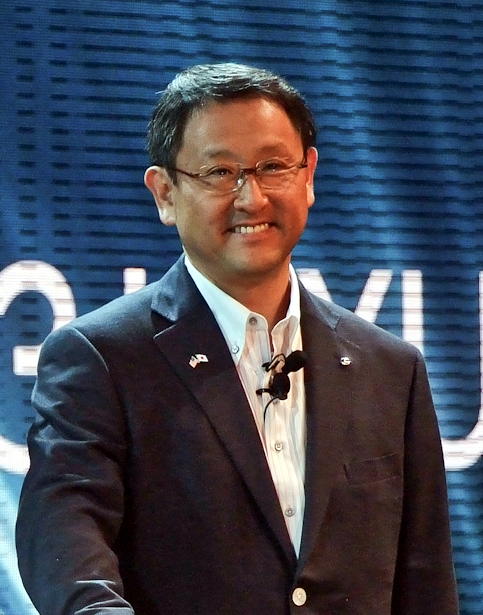
Akio Toyoda

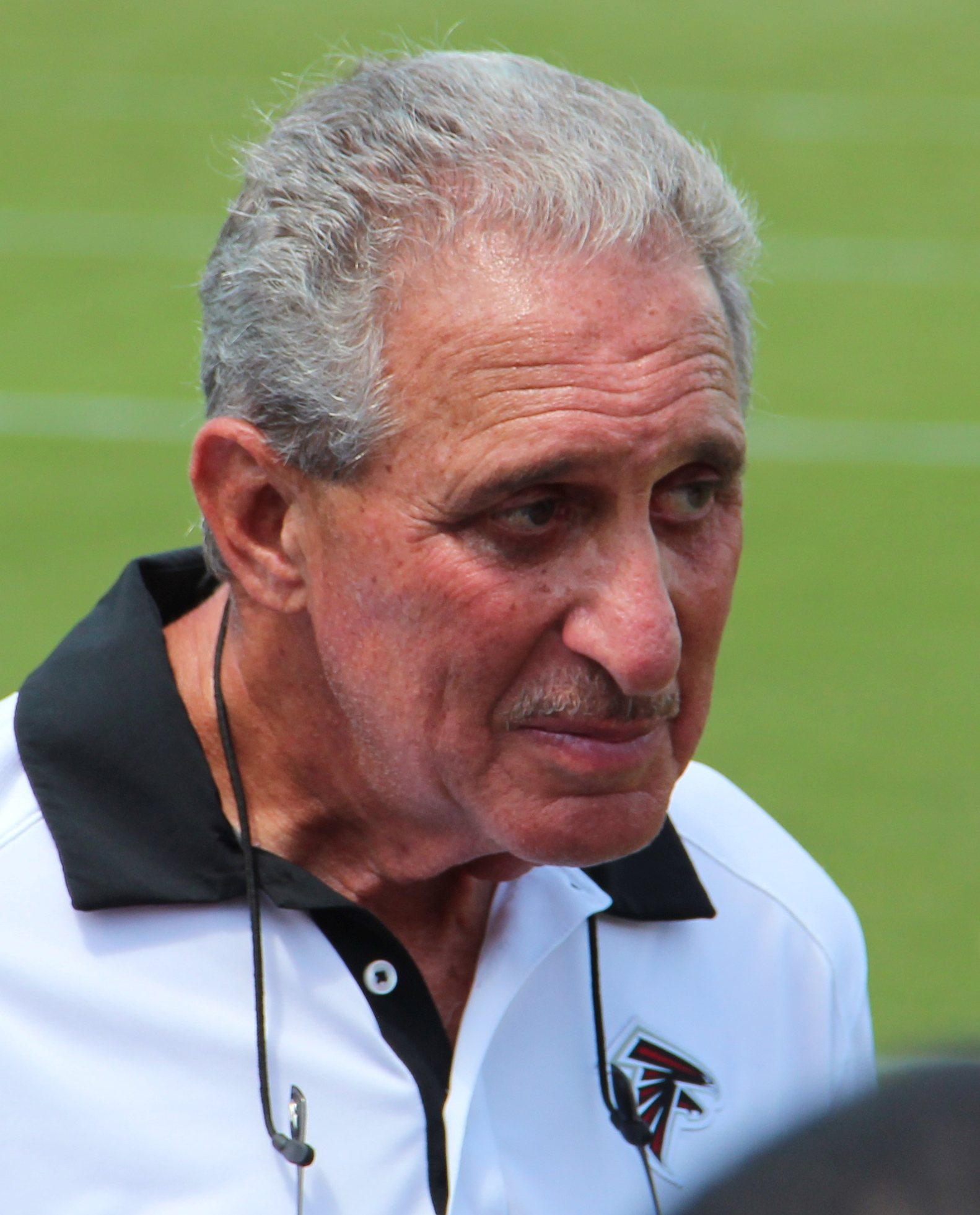
Arthur Blank

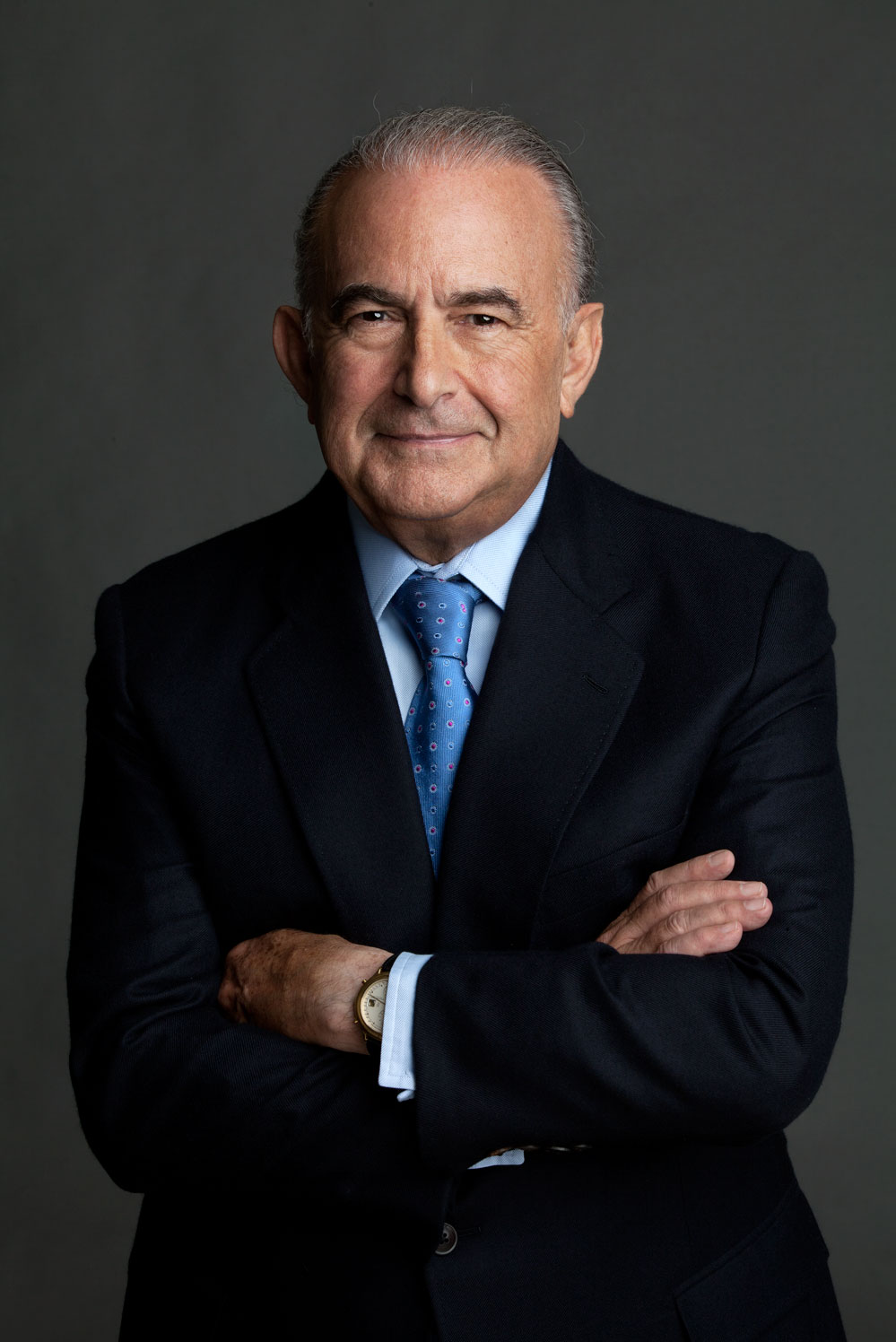
Gustavo Cisneros

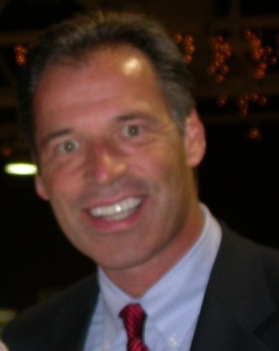
Craig Benson

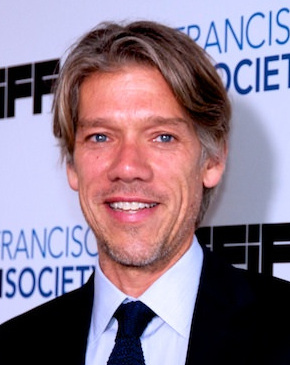
Stephen Gaghan

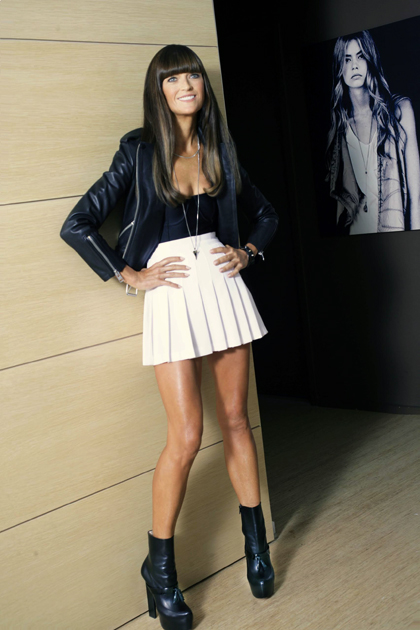
Ruthie Davis

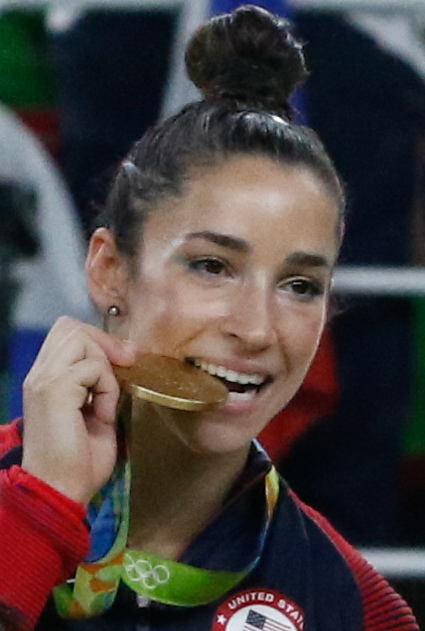
Aly Raisman

This is a representative selection of Babson College alumni and attendees who have achieved notability in business, government, athletics, and the arts. A more complete listing is available at Category:Babson College alumni.

- Akio Toyoda 1982: chairman (and former CEO) of Toyota Motor Corporation
- Arthur Blank 1963: co-founder of The Home Depot; owner of the Atlanta Falcons and Atlanta United FC
- Roger Enrico 1965: former CEO of PepsiCo and chairman of DreamWorks Animation
- Gustavo Cisneros 1968: Venezuelan media magnate; chairman of Grupo Cisneros
- Craig Benson 1977: entrepreneur and former Governor of New Hampshire
- Stephen Gaghan 1988: Academy Award-winning screenwriter and director
- Ruthie Davis 1993: fashion designer
- Michael Bastian 1987: fashion designer
- Ernesto Bertarelli 1989: businessman
- Aly Raisman (attended): Olympic gymnast and gold medalist
- C. Dean Metropoulos 1968: investor; co-owner of Hostess Brands and former owner of Pabst Brewing Company
- Timothy J. Bilecki 2022: Civilian Military Defense Counsel, Former U.S. Army JAG Corps Officer
