= Rebecca Vernon =

U.S. Air Force general

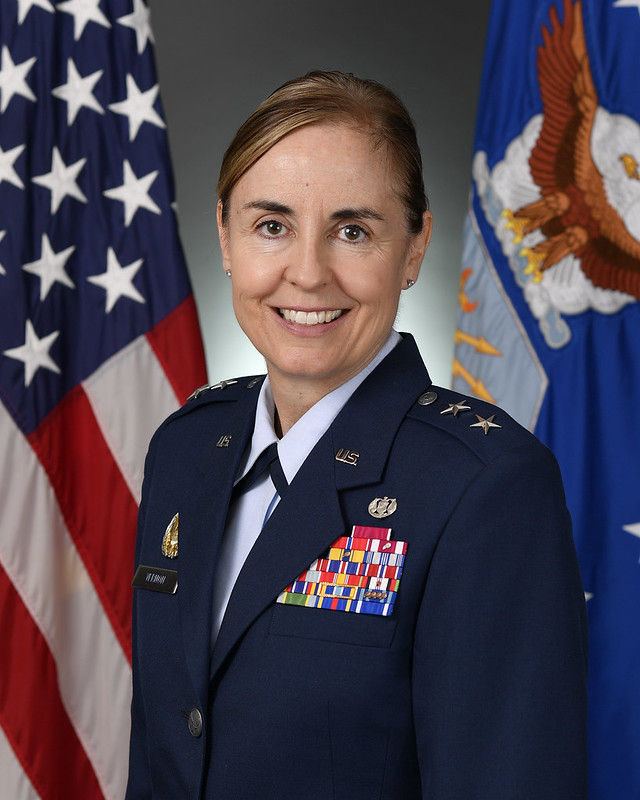
- Official portrait, 2022
- Military career
- Allegiance: United States
- Branch: United States Air Force
- Service years: 1996–2026
- Rank: Major General
- Awards: Legion of Merit (2); Bronze Star

Rebecca R. Vernon is a retired United States Air Force major general who has served as the acting judge advocate general of the United States Air Force since February 21, 2025, and as the deputy judge advocate general of the United States Air Force since May 2022. She previously served as the director of military justice and discipline of the United States Air Force Judge Advocate General's Corps. In March 2022, she was nominated for promotion to major general and assigned to serve as the deputy judge advocate general of the Air Force. Her retirement date was January 1, 2026.

Military offices
| Preceded by Sharon A. Shaffer | Director of Military Justice and Discipline of the United States Air Force Judge Advocate General's Corps; 2020–2022 | Succeeded by Gail E. Crawford |
| Preceded by Charles L. Plummer | Deputy Judge Advocate General of the United States Air Force; 2022–2025 | Incumbent |
