= United States Army Legal Services Agency =

Judge Advocate General unit

U.S. Army Legal Services Agency
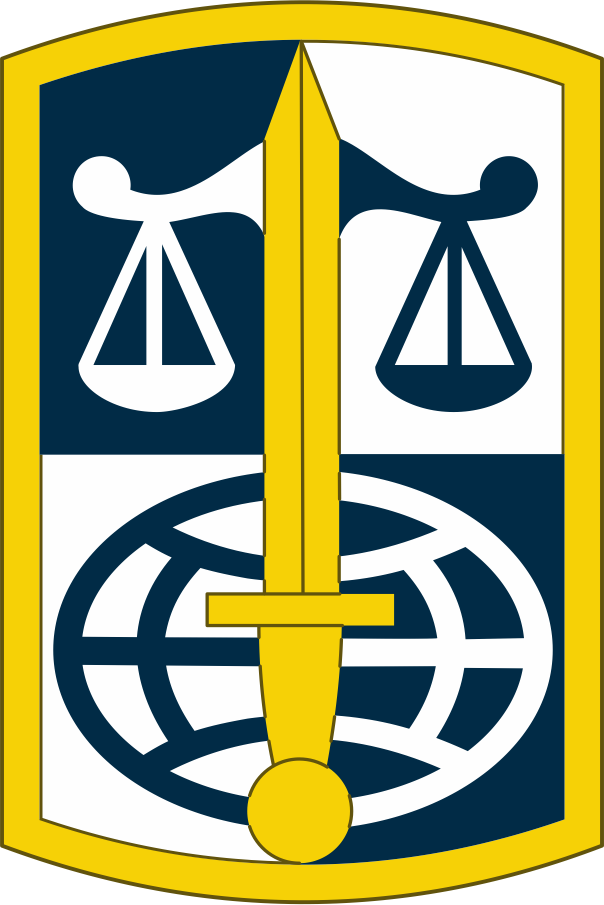
- USALSA shoulder sleeve insignia
- Active: 1973–present
- Country: United States
- Branch: United States Army
- Type: Agency
- Size: 500 employees (2023)
- Part of: Judge Advocate General
- Garrison/HQ: Fort Belvoir, Virginia
- Mottos: Legibus Armisque Devoti (Latin) ("Devoted to Law and Arms")

Commanders
- Current commander: BG Steven M. Ranieri

Insignia
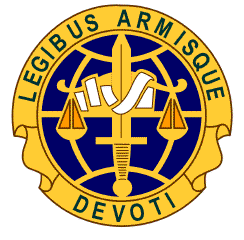
- Distinctive unit insignia

The United States Army Legal Services Agency (USALSA) is an agency of the United States Army that provides legal services for Army matters. The agency is a component of the Army Judge Advocate General, and is located at Fort Belvoir, Virginia.

== History ==
The U.S. Army Legal Services Agency (USALSA) was established on 15 March 1973, as a field operating agency of the Judge Advocate General (TJAG). TJAG held command and staff supervision of the agency. The agency's original mission was to provide administrative support for the Army Judiciary, the various appellate counsel divisions, and the Contract Appeals Division.

The formation of USALSA followed the Military Justice Act of 1968, which had updated United States military courts and the Uniform Code of Military Justice (UCMJ).

Certain units of USALSA became collectively known and designated as the United States Army Judiciary, including: the United States Army Court of Military Review, the Office of the Chief Judge, Clerk of Court, Trial Judiciary and Examination, and New Trials Division.

USALSA relocated to Fort Belvoir, Virginia in 2011. Over its history, the agency had locations in Falls Church and Arlington, Virginia, and at the Pentagon.

== Organization ==
The agency has control of 20 divisions, activities, and services, including:

- Office of the Chief Judge
- Trial Judiciary – implemented in 1969, it consists of more than 40 active and reserve, field-grade JAG officers who act as Army military trial judges. The Army Trial Judiciary is divided into eight geographical circuits:
  - the 1st Judicial Circuit in the Northeastern and Middle Atlantic States;
  - the 2d Judicial Circuit in the mid-Southeast;
  - the 3d Judicial Circuit in the Southeast;
  - the 4th Judicial Circuit in the Upper Far West;
  - the 5th Judicial Circuit in the Lower Mid-West,
  - the 6th Judicial Circuit in the Pacific Northwest;
  - the 7th Judicial Circuit in Hawaii and the Far East; and
  - the 8th Judicial Circuit in Europe and the Middle East.
  - The Army Trial Judiciary also publishes the Military Judges' Benchbook (DA Pamphlet 27-9), which consists of training documents utilized by military judges of the United States armed services
- Army Court of Criminal Appeals – reorganized in the late 1960s as the Army Court of Military Review, in 1994 it was renamed as the Army Court of Criminal Appeals. A court is composed of three judicial panels; each panel includes three appellate judges and a commissioner which mirrors the civilian court system.
- Clerk of Court
- New Trials Division
- Regulatory Law Office – became part of USALSA in 1977
- U.S. Army Trial Defense Service (USATDS) – established in 1980. USATDS has nearly 500 active and reserve JAG officers responsible for the defense counsel in courts-martial, UCMJ, Article 32 investigations, and in other judicial and administrative proceedings.
- Defense Counsel Assistance Program (DCAP) – 1982: a resource for training defense counsels and paralegals.
- Information Management Office – established in 1983 as part of USALSA
- Army Court-Martial Information System – an information system instituted in 1986
- Litigation Division – became part of USALSA in 1987
- Intellectual Property Division – assigned to USALSA in 1988
- Procurement Fraud Division – transferred to USALSA in 1988: the division is one centralized organization in the Army that monitors and prosecutes criminal, civil, contractual, and administrative cases of fraud or corruption relating to Army procurement.
- Environmental Law Division – became part of USALSA in 1988
- Standards of Conduct Office – established in 1990 as an office of USALSA
- U.S. Army Claims Service (USARCS) – became part of USALSA in 1997; it reviews claims against the Army by those who experienced injury, death, or property damage or loss due to the official actions of Army employees.

== Insignia ==
=== Shoulder sleeve insignia ===
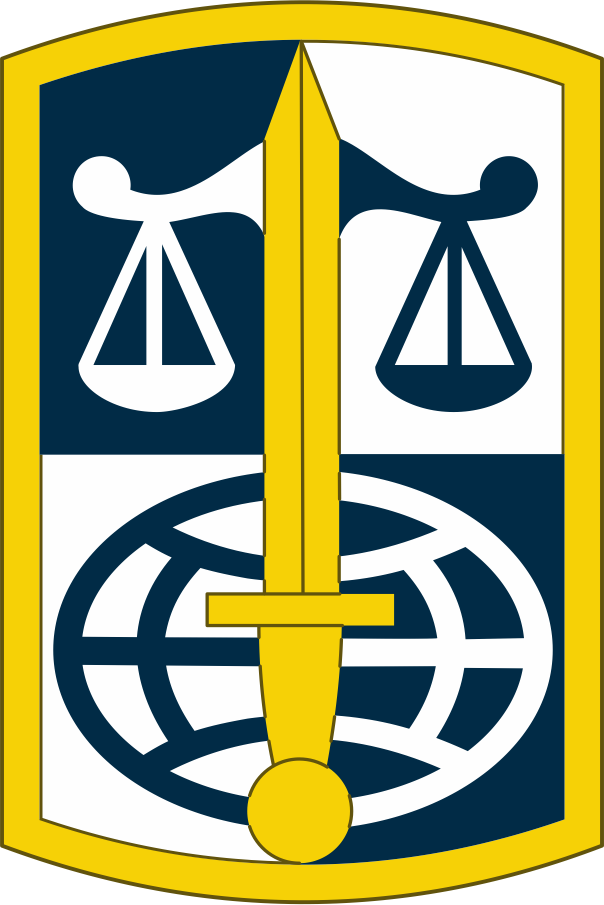
USALSA shoulder sleeve insignia

The shoulder sleeve insignia of the U.S. Army Legal Services Agency was approved by the Institute of Heraldry on 8 May 1984.

Dark blue and white are the branch colors of the Judge Advocate General's Corps, and gold represents excellence and achievement. The insignia's overall shape is similar to a Roman shield. The sword is symbolic of the agency's military connection. The sword also serves as a reminder of the Romans' role as early lawmakers. The weighing scale is an ancient symbol of justice. The grid-lined globe refers to the agency's worldwide legal activities.

=== Distinctive unit insignia ===
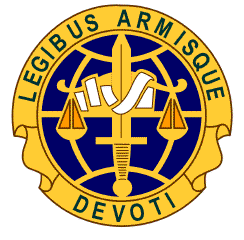
USALSA distinctive unit insignia

The distinctive unit insignia of the U.S. Army Legal Services Agency was approved by the Institute of Heraldry on 8 May 1984.

The sword, grid-lined globe, and weighing scale all have similar meaning to their shoulder sleeve insignia counterparts. An added element is the blindfold entwined around the sword and scale, connecting them together to form a unit for impartial military justice. The Latin motto "Legibus Armisque Devoti", translates to "Devoted to Law and Arms".

=== Combat service identification badge ===
The combat service identification badge of the U.S. Army Legal Services Agency consists of a similar design to that of the shoulder sleeve insignia.
