= American Apparel & Footwear Association =

American trade association

The American Apparel & Footwear Association (AAFA) is a 501(c)(6) trade association. AAFA was formed in August 2000 through the merger of the American Apparel and Manufacturers Association (AAMA) and Footwear Industries of America (FIA).

== Role ==
As the national trade association representing apparel, footwear, travel goods and other sewn products companies, and their suppliers which compete in the global market. AAFA represents more than 1,100 world famous name brands.

== Priorities ==
AAFA drives progress on three key priorities: Brand Protection; Supply Chain & Sourcing; Trade, Logistics, & Manufacturing. AAFA approaches this work through the lens of purpose-driven leadership in a manner that supports each member's ability to build and sustain inclusive and diverse cultures, meet and advance ESG goals, and draw upon the latest technology.

== Leadership ==
AAFA is led by President and CEO Steve Lamar and the AAFA Board of Directors. The AAFA Board of Directors includes five officers:

- Chair: Joe Preston, President and CEO, New Balance Athletics, Inc.
- Vice Chair: Danilo Amoretty, Senior Vice President of Global Product Supply and Operations, Carhartt, Inc.
- Treasurer: Christopher Volpe, COO / CFO, United Legwear & Apparel Co.
- Secretary: Sally Gilligan, Chief Supply Chain and Transformation Officer, Gap Inc.
- Past Chair: Halide Alagöz, Chief Product and Merchandising Officer, Ralph Lauren Corporation
