= Clark Hall (University of Virginia) =

Academic building in Virginia, US

- Clark Hall, University of Virginia
- U.S. National Register of Historic Places
- Virginia Landmarks Register
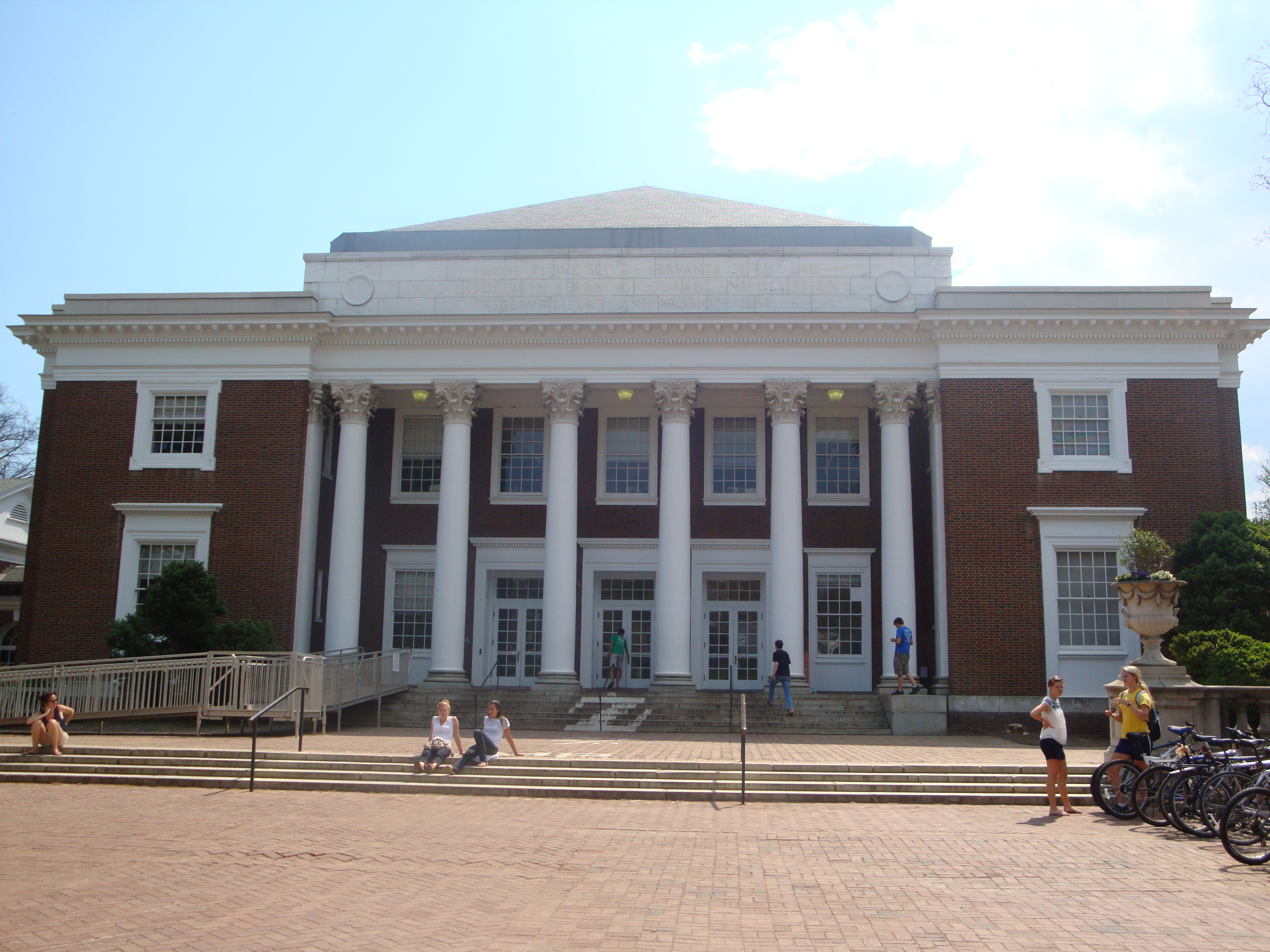

- Location within Virginia
- Location: 291 McCormick Rd., Charlottesville, Virginia
- Coordinates: 38°01′59″N 78°30′28″W
- Area: 1.5 acres (6,100 m^{2})
- Built: 1932
- Architect: Architectural Commission, University of Virginia
- Architectural style: Classical Revival
- NRHP reference No.: 08000871
- VLR No.: 002-5149

Significant dates
- Added to NRHP: September 5, 2008
- Designated VLR: June 19, 2008

Clark Hall is a building on the campus of the University of Virginia in Charlottesville, Virginia. It was completed in 1932 to hold the university's School of Law. The building was listed on the National Register of Historic Places on September 5, 2008.

It is the 10th property listed as a featured property of the week in a program of the National Park Service that began in July 2008. Today, the building houses the University's Department of Environmental Sciences and the Charles L. Brown Science and Engineering Library.

== Murals ==
Its two-story, sky-lit, mural-decorated Memorial Library room "is one of the Commonwealth's most significant 20th-century architectural interiors". They were created in 1934 by American muralist Allyn Cox and represent scenes of the development of civil and moral law.

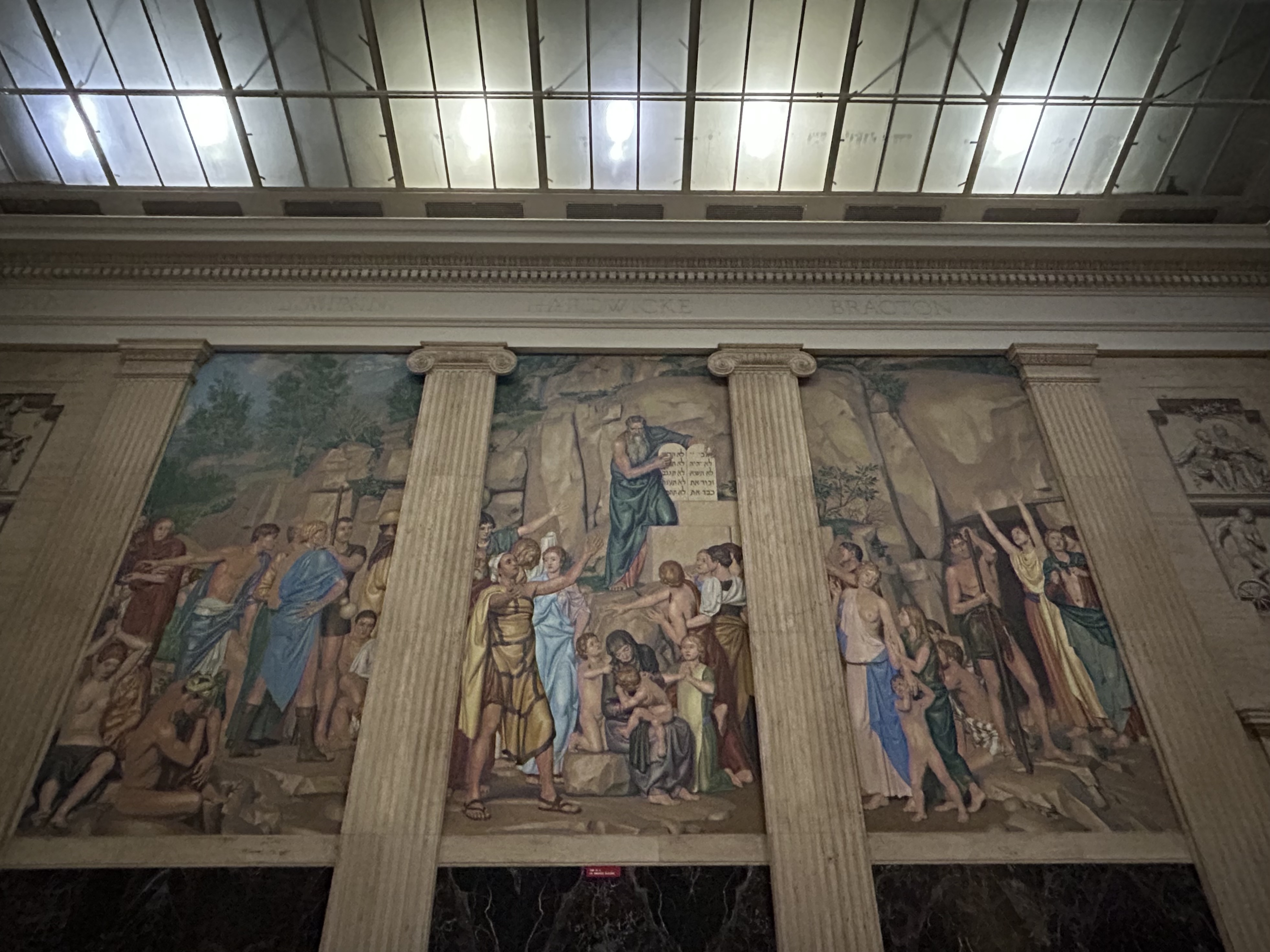
One of the two murals at Clark Hall

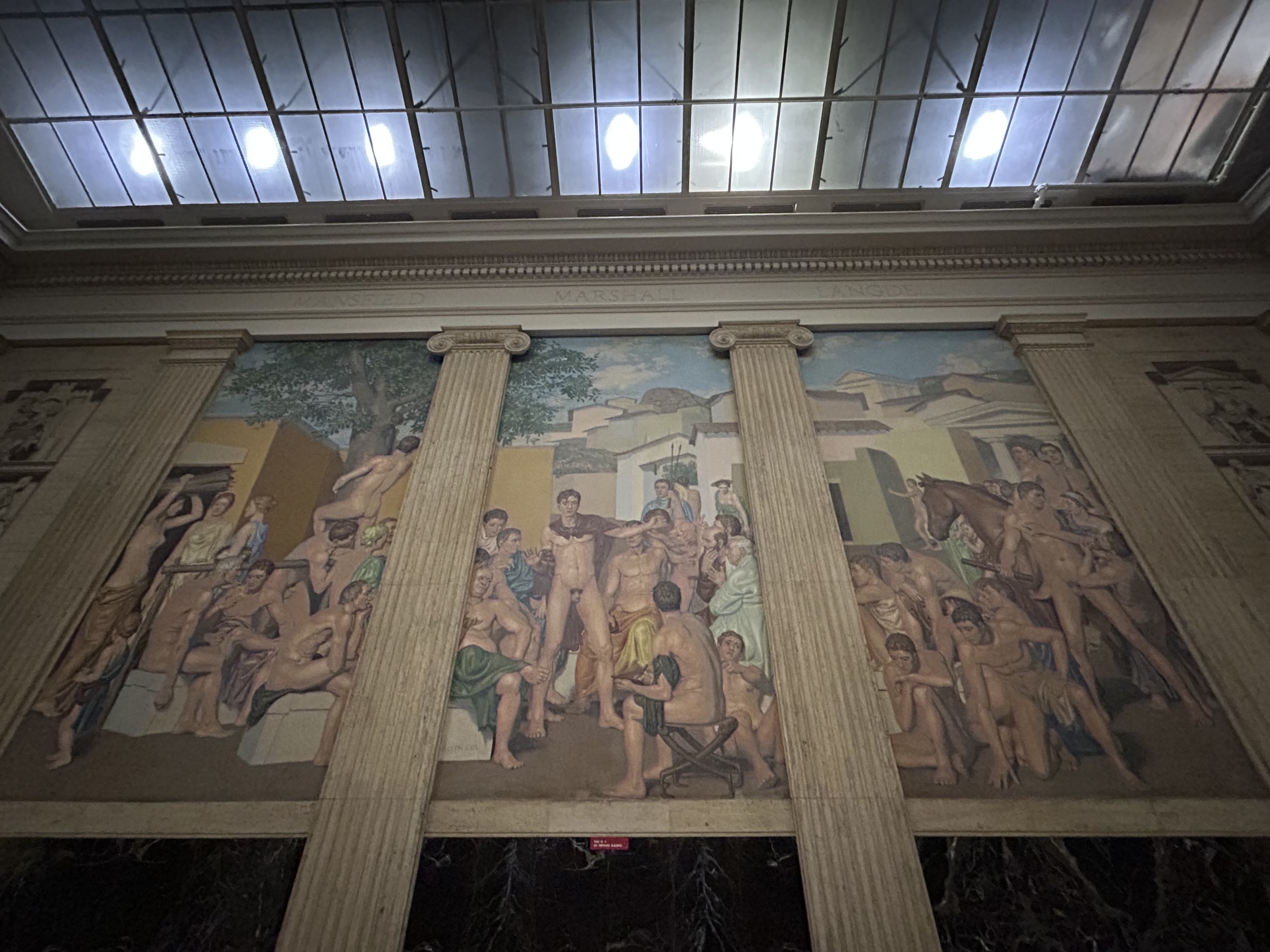
The other mural at Clark Hall

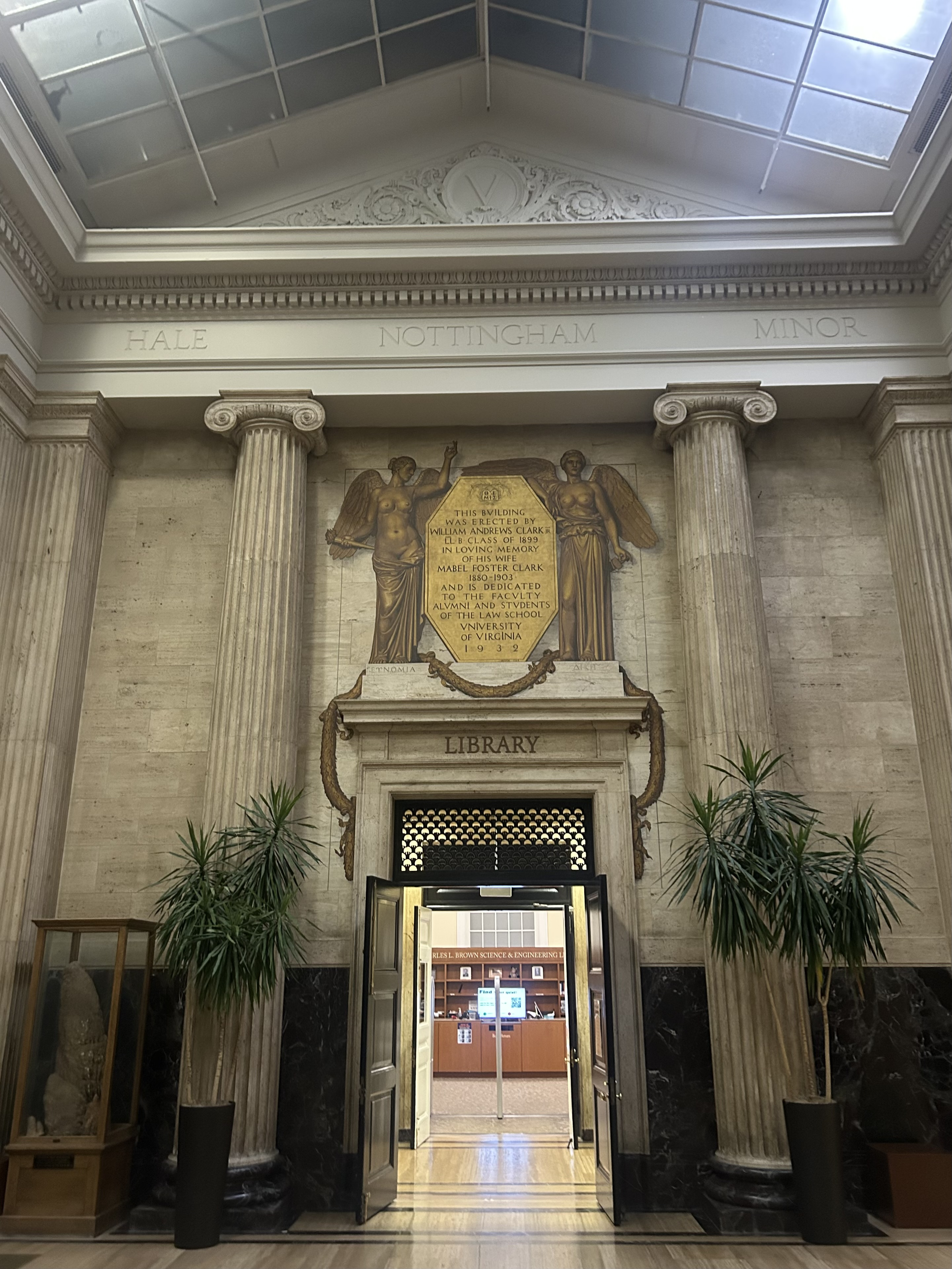
The entrance to Brown Library inside the Mural Room
