= Air Force Legal Operations Agency =

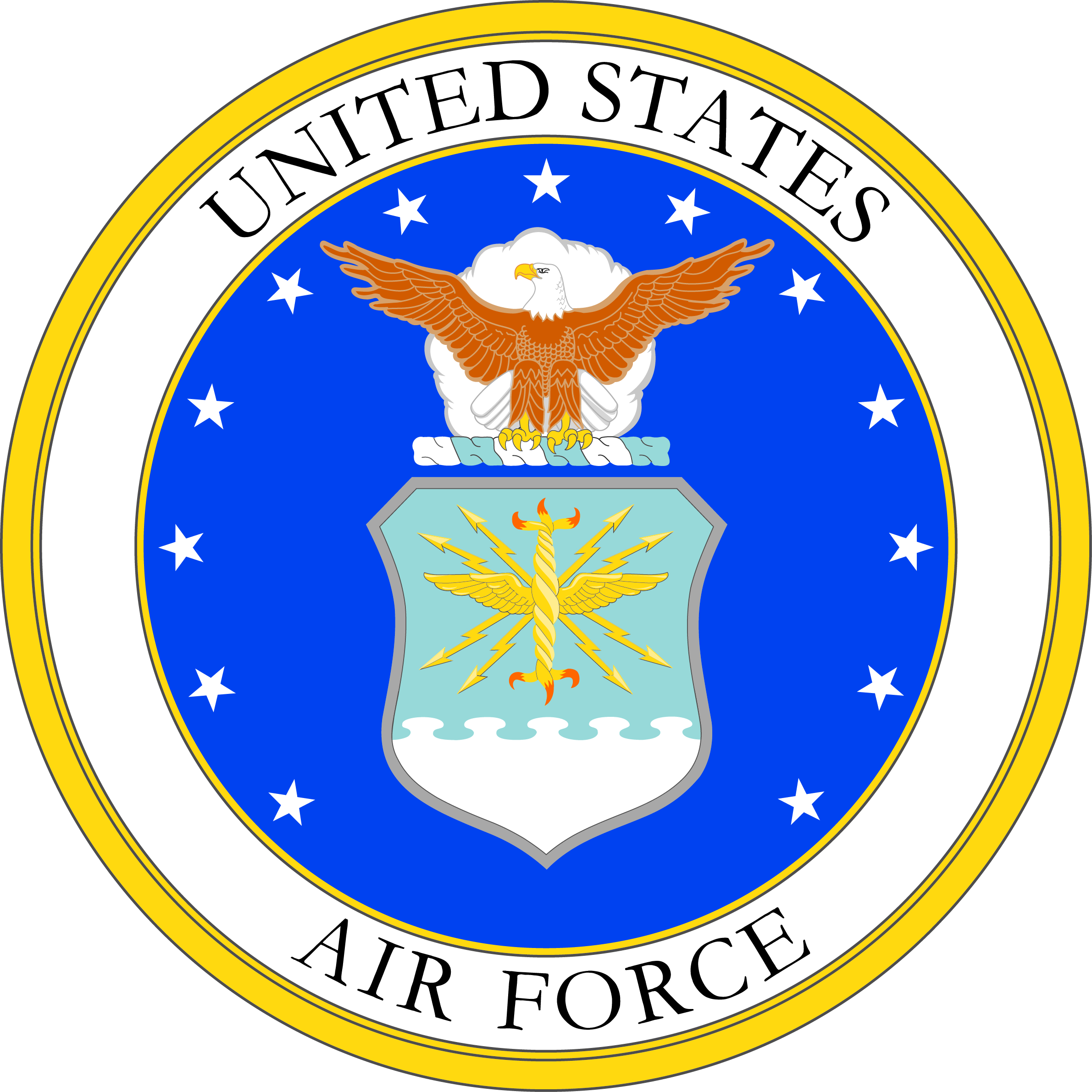
Air Force Legal Operations Agency

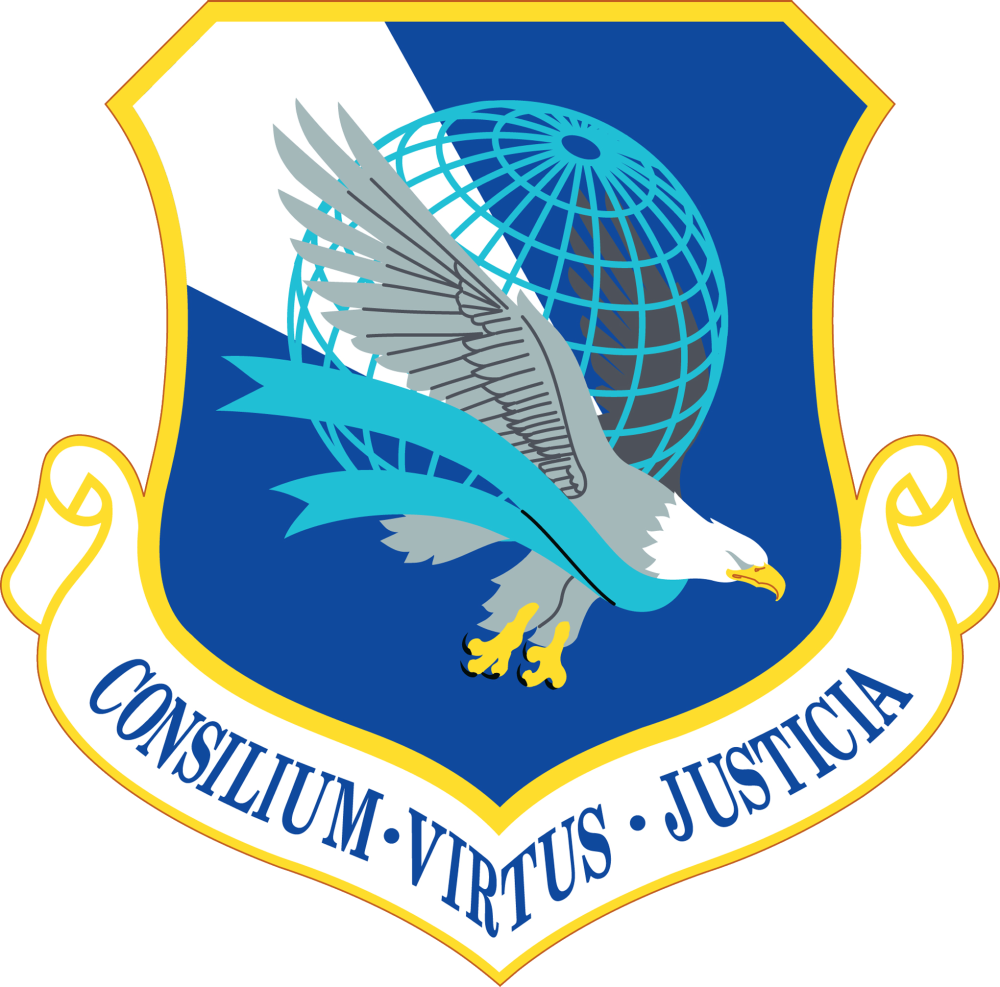
- Air Force Legal Operations Agency emblem
- Active: 1 July 1978 – present
- Country: United States
- Branch: United States Air Force
- Part of: United States Air Force
- Garrison/HQ: Joint Base Andrews, Maryland

The Air Force Legal Operations Agency includes all senior defense counsel, senior trial counsel, and appellate defense and government counsel in the United States Air Force, as well as all Air Force civil litigators defending the Air Force against civil law suits claiming damages and seeking other remedies in contracts, environmental, labor, and tort litigation.

The agency includes numerous field support centers to include tort claim, environmental law, labor law, commercial litigation, contract law, medical law, and accident investigation board. It also includes the utility litigation team, the Medical Cost Reimbursement program, and the Air Force Claims Service Center. The agency also includes the Judge Advocate General's school and the Information Systems Directorate. This provides information technology services to worldwide Air Force legal offices and provides federal legal information technology through Federal Legal Information Technology and electronics services to legal offices throughout the Department of Defense. AFLOA has offices worldwide at more than 76 locations and consists of 426 military and civilian attorneys and 405 military and civilian paralegals and support personnel.
