= The Judge Advocate General's Legal Center and School =

Federal service academy

Coordinates: 38°3′15″N 78°30′28″W

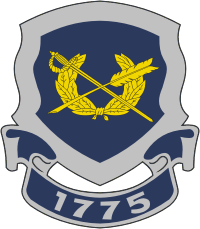
- Distinctive unit insignia
- Established: 1 February 1942; 84 years ago
- Location: Charlottesville, Virginia, United States
- Campus: Urban
- Website: tjaglcs.army.mil

The Judge Advocate General's Legal Center and School, also known as The JAG School or TJAGLCS, is a graduate-level division federal service academy located on the grounds of the University of Virginia in Charlottesville, Virginia. The center is accredited by the American Bar Association to award the Master of Laws (LL.M.) degree in Military Law. The center educates military, civilian, and international personnel in legal and leadership skills. The LL.M. curriculum includes courses in Administrative and Civil Law, Contract and Fiscal Law, Criminal Law, and National Security Law. The school serves primarily as the U.S. Army's law school for the Officer Basic Course (OBC) for initial-entry Judge Advocates, and as the graduate program for Judge Advocates of all services branches. It is the only ABA-accredited law school that only awards an LL.M. and not a Juris Doctor degree.

== History ==
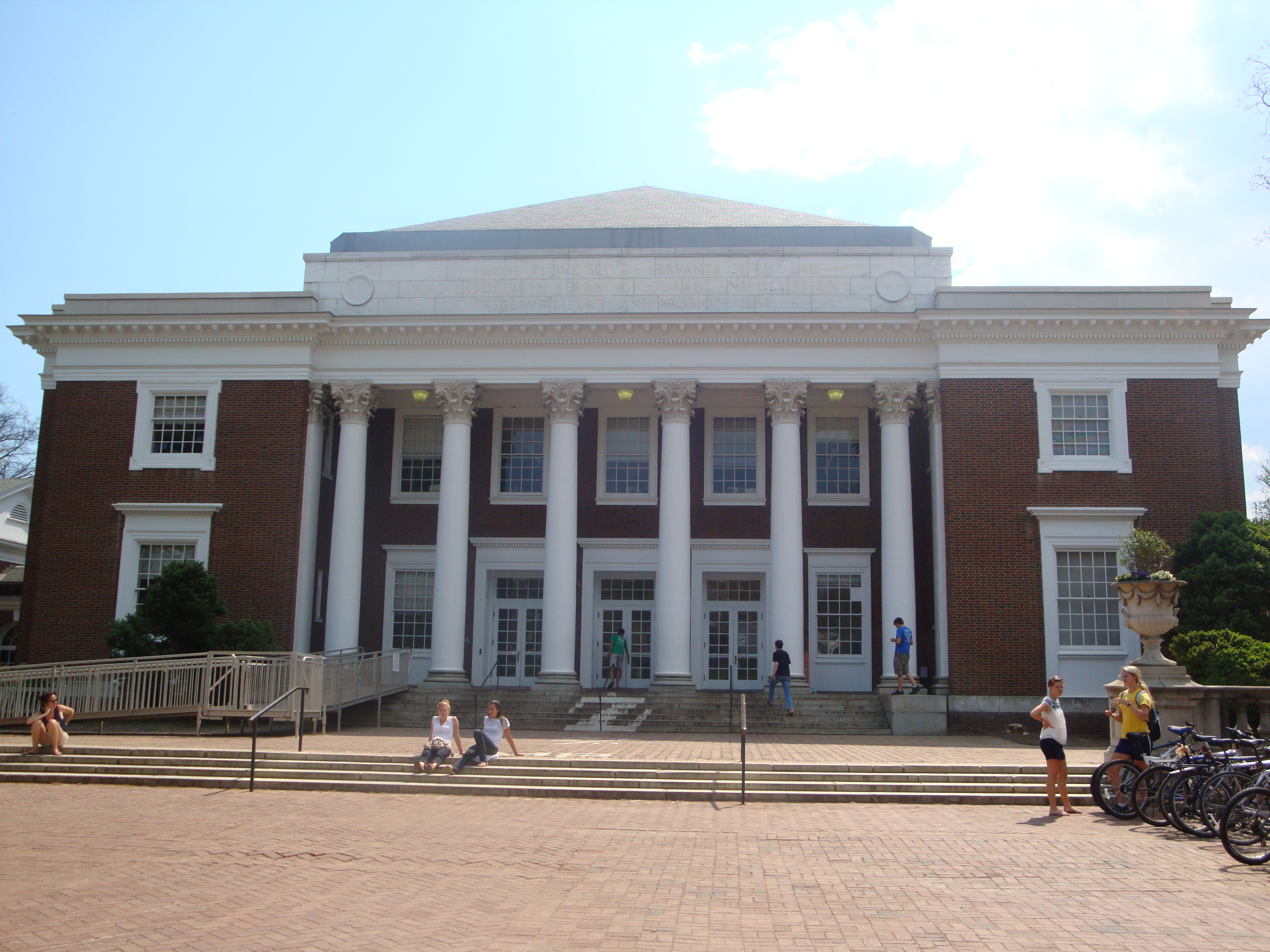
The JAG School was initially located in Clark Hall within University of Virginia Law School from 1951 to 1975.

Despite a long record of service by Army Judge Advocates, it was not until the beginning of World War II that efforts were made to provide Army attorneys with specialized military legal education. In February 1942, as uniformed lawyers' responsibilities increased in volume and complexity, specialized continuing legal education courses for Judge Advocates began in Washington, D.C. In August 1942, the school moved from Washington's National University School of Law to the University of Michigan Law School in Ann Arbor, Michigan. Intended as a temporary facility, it was deactivated in 1946 during the general demobilization following World War II. In October 1950, another temporary school was activated at Fort Myer, Virginia, on land that is now a part of Arlington National Cemetery. After graduating six classes, it was decided a permanent school for Army lawyers should be established.

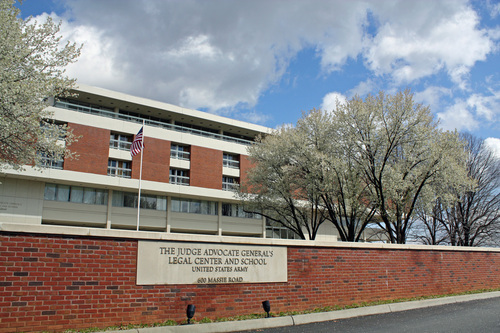
Frontage of the JAG School

In August 1951, the Army accepted an offer from the University of Virginia to move the school there. The Seventh Judge Advocate Officer Basic Course and First Judge Advocate Officer Advanced Course began in the fall of 1951. The University of Virginia because it was near Washington, D.C., and at the time, had the largest law library in the South. The Judge Advocate General's School was initially located in Clark Hall, then behind Clark Hall in what is now called Kerchof Hall. In 1975, the JAG School moved with the UVA's Law School to the university's North Grounds. JAG students often share courses with UVA law students, and UVA law professors serve as Army JAG officers.

The building, and the adjacent law school building, were designed by Hugh Stubbins & Associates with Rawlings, Wilson, and Fraher. An addition to the building, designed by Bohlin, Powell, Larkin, and Cywinski in collaboration with Johnson, Craven, and Gibson, was completed in 1991.

== Leadership ==
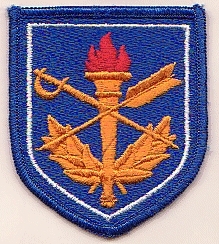
Shoulder Sleeve Insignia worn by Army and Air Force personnel assigned to The Judge Advocate General's Legal Center and School

The Legal Center and School (LCS) is led by a brigadier general who serves as the commander, a colonel as the chief of staff, a chief warrant officer who serves as the command chief warrant officer, and a command sergeant major who serves as the senior enlisted advisor for the LCS and also as the commandant of the Noncommissioned Officer Academy. The school is led by a colonel who serves as the dean, and the center is led by a colonel who serves as the legal center director. The school's four academic departments are led by lieutenant colonels. Faculty members are lieutenant colonels or majors who are licensed attorneys and are members of the Army Judge Advocate General's Corps. Each academic department has at least one faculty member who is a judge advocate in the Navy, Marine Corps, or Air Force.

Before entering JAG School, Army judge advocates must have graduated from an ABA-accredited law school and be admitted to practice law by the highest court of a state or federal district. While some judge advocates lack enlisted or commissioned experience. The JAG School is generally considered the most exclusive graduate service academy within the U.S. federal government. Acceptance into the Army JAG Corps and subsequent JAG School is considered "highly selective" with an acceptance rate ranging between 4-7%. In 2017, the Army JAG Corps accepted 200 of 4,000 applicants. The JAG School has long supplied attorneys to military and federal government roles, particularly the federal judiciary.

The initial entry training into the JAG Corps is composed of two phases: a 4-week Direct Commission Course (DCC) at Fort Sill, Oklahoma, then military legal training at the JAG School.

== Master of Laws (LL.M.) ==
The Judge Advocate Officer Graduate Course is the school's "flagship" course. Accredited by the American Bar Association, the course prepares experienced military attorneys for supervisory duties and other positions of increased responsibility within their respective services. Students who complete the course are awarded a Master of Laws degree in Military Law. Selection to attend the course is a permanent change of station assignment; students do not attend in a temporary duty status. Each class consists of attorneys from the Army, Navy, Air Force, Marine Corps, and Coast Guard, as well as international military students and Army civilian attorneys. International military students have come from Egypt, Nigeria, Israel, Poland, Romania, South Korea, Bosnia and Herzegovina and other nations. All students are licensed attorneys who generally have five to eight years of experience.

The Graduate Course covers a full resident academic year from mid-August to mid-May. The fall and spring semesters include core classes required of all students. In the second quarter of the fall semester and in the spring semester, students select from approximately fifty electives offered by the school's four academic departments: Administrative and Civil Law, Contract and Fiscal Law, Criminal Law, and International and Operational Law. Students may specialize in one of the four academic areas in conjunction with the Master of Laws. To qualify for a specialty, a student must either write a thesis in the area of specialization, or earn at least ten elective credit hours and write an extensive paper in the area of specialization.

== Other programs ==
The school also trains new Army Judge Advocates in the Judge Advocate Officer Basic Course (three courses are completed each year), provides continuing legal education for Judge Advocates and other attorneys, and trains legal administrator warrant officers, paralegal noncommissioned officers, and court reporters.

The school's Noncommissioned Officers Academy offers the Advanced Leaders Course and the Senior Leaders Course.

== See also ==
- Naval Justice School
- Air Force Judge Advocate General's School
