= United States Army Judge Advocate General's Corps =

Legal arm of the U.S. Army

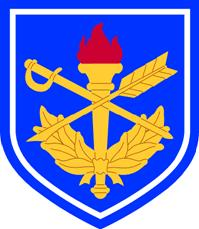
- Shoulder sleeve insignia
- Active: 29 July 1775 – 1 June 1802; 2 March 1849 – present
- Country: United States
- Branch: United States Army
- Role: Military law
- Mottos: "Soldier first, lawyer always"
- Colors: Dark Blue and White
- Engagements: Revolutionary War; American Civil War; Spanish–American War; World War I World War II; Korean War; Vietnam War; Gulf War; War in Afghanistan; Iraq War
- Website: Official website

Commanders
- TJAG: MG Bobby Christine
- DJAG: MG Robert A. Borcherding
- Notable commanders: LTC William Tudor; BG Joseph Holt; MG Enoch H. Crowder; MG Blanton C. Winship; MG Kenneth J. Hodson; MG John L. Fugh; LTG Scott C. Black; LTG Charles N. Pede

Insignia
- Branch insignia

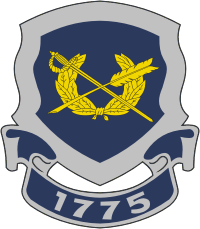
- Distinctive unit insignia

The Judge Advocate General's Corps of the United States Army, also known as the U.S. Army JAG Corps is the legal arm of the United States Army. It is composed of Army officers who are also lawyers ("judge advocates"), who provide legal services to the Army at all levels of command, and also includes legal administrator warrant officers, paralegal noncommissioned officers and junior enlisted personnel, and civilian employees.

The Judge Advocate General of the United States Army (TJAG)—the commanding general of the Army JAG Corps—is a lieutenant general. All military officers are appointed by the U.S. president subject to the advice and consent of the Senate, but the Judge Advocate General is one of the few positions in the Army explicitly provided for by law in Title 10 of the United States Code, and requiring a distinct appointment. When officers who have already been appointed to another branch of the Army join the JAG Corps, rather than merely transferring branches, they are administratively dismissed and simultaneously recommissioned anew as judge advocates.

== The Judge Advocate General ==
The U.S. Army JAG Corps was founded by General George Washington with the appointment of William Tudor as the Judge Advocate General on 29 July 1775. The Army JAG Corps is the oldest of the judge advocate communities in the U.S. armed forces – as well as the oldest law firm in the United States. The Judge Advocate General, who is referred to as TJAG (pronounced "tea-jag"), serves a term of four years. The position was a 2-star (major general) billet until December 2008, when the promotion of Scott C. Black to the grade of lieutenant general brought it into parity with the Army's Surgeon General and Chief of Engineers.

The current Judge Advocate General is Major General Bobby L. Christine.

== Mission ==
Judge advocates occupying the position of staff judge advocate (SJA) serve on the special and personal staff of general officers in command and who are general court-martial convening authorities (in other words, who have the authority to convene a general court-martial). Staff judge advocates advise commanders on the full range of legal matters encountered in government legal practice and provide advice on courts-martial as required by the Uniform Code of Military Justice. Subordinate judge advocates prosecute courts-martial, and others, assigned to the independent United States Army Trial Defense Service and United States Army Trial Judiciary, serve as defense counsel and judges. The almost 2,000 full-time judge advocates and civilian attorneys who serve The Judge Advocate General's Corps comprise the largest group of attorneys who serve the U.S. Army. Several hundred other attorneys practice under the Chief Counsel of the United States Army Corps of Engineers and the Command Counsel of the United States Army Materiel Command.

Judge advocates, legal administrators and military paralegals are deployed throughout the United States and around the world, including Japan, South Korea, Germany, Kosovo, Iraq, Afghanistan, Kuwait, and Qatar. They provide legal assistance to soldiers, adjudicate claims against the Army, advise commands on targeting decisions and other aspects of operational law, and assist the command in administering military justice by preparing non-judicial punishment actions, administrative separation actions, and trying criminal cases at court-martial.

In addition to the active component judge advocates, there are approximately 5,000 attorneys who serve in the US Army Reserve and the Army National Guard. Several hundred Reserve and National Guard attorneys were called to active duty to serve in support of Operation Iraqi Freedom and Operation Enduring Freedom.

== Legal Center and School ==
The Judge Advocate General's School began in World War II at the University of Michigan to train new judge advocates as the Judge Advocate General's Department rapidly expanded. It was disestablished for a time after the war but, after a short stay at Fort Myer in Arlington, Virginia, was reestablished at the University of Virginia in 1951.

The Judge Advocate General's Legal Center and School (TJAGLCS) is located on the North Grounds at the University of Virginia in Charlottesville, Virginia, adjoining, but distinct from, the University of Virginia School of Law. The Commandant of the Judge Advocate General's School is authorized by Congress to award a Master of Laws degree. The school is the only federal institution to have American Bar Association accreditation as one of America's law schools. Judge advocates from all five armed forces of the United States and international students attend the annual Judge Advocate Officer Graduate Course in which the master's degree is awarded.

The Legal Center and School also trains the Army's new judge advocates, provides continuing legal education for judge advocates and lawyers from throughout the United States government. In addition to lawyers, TJAGLCS also trains newly selected legal administrator warrant officers, paralegal noncommissioned officers and court reporters (new judge advocate enlisted soldiers attend AIT at Fort Gregg-Adams, Virginia). The school also trains those officers appointed as military judges, irrespective of service.

TJAGLCS is not a member of the Association of American Law Schools (AALS), but has paid a fee to receive AALS services.

In many military branches, there is a program that will send officers to law school to eventually serve as Judge Advocates upon completion of the program and law school. In the United States Army, the program is called the Funded Legal Education Program (FLEP). The Army Regulation that explains the program in all its terms is AR 27-1, Chapter 14. Every year, the United States Army will send a combination of up to 25 commissioned officers and non-commissioned officers to law school and will pay all tuition costs along with paying the Soldier their usual pay entitlements throughout the duration of law school to include base pay, special pay, Basic Allowance for Housing, and Overseas Cost of Living Allowances (if applicable). In return, the service member is required to serve as a judge advocate officer in the United States Army for six years. While the Army does not release official figures, the general agreed upon numbers on various discussion boards and forums is that around 80-90 people apply each year and 20-25 are selected. The package to apply to the program includes: a memorandum that explains why one is interested in the program, college transcripts, list of law schools, LSAT score, statement of years of service, statement of secret security clearance, interview with a Senior Judge Advocate, Personnel Records Brief and evaluation Reports, and optional Letters of Recommendation.

== Army judge advocate, legal administrator and paralegal qualifications ==
Prior to entry into the JAG Corps, all Army judge advocates must have graduated from an ABA-accredited law school and be admitted to practice law by the highest court of a state or federal district. While some judge advocates have prior enlisted or commissioned experience, most are direct commissioned and have no prior military training or experience. Acceptance into the Army JAG Corps is highly selective with an acceptance rate between 4-7%. In 2017, the Army JAG Corps accepted 200 out of 4,000 applicants.

Initial entry training into the JAG Corps is composed of two phases:

- 4-week Direct Commission Course (DCC) at Fort Sill, Oklahoma
- 11-week Judge Advocate Officer Basic Course (JAOBC) at The Judge Advocate General's Legal Center and School (TJAGLCS)

As of the summer of 2013, JAOBC Phase I, formerly conducted at Fort Lee, Virginia is no longer a requirement for JAOBC students. Students now report directly to DCC in Fort Sill, Oklahoma, and upon completion of DCC travel to Charlottesville for JAOBC.

From 2006 until the end of 2009, students attended the JAOBC Phase I at Fort Lee, Virginia, followed by the JAOBC in Charlottesville. Students then attended a 4-week DCC at Fort Benning, Georgia or Fort Sill, Oklahoma, followed immediately by the 6 1/2-week Basic Officer Leaders Course, or BOLC II. BOLC II was discontinued at the end of 2009.

JAG Corps warrant officer legal administrators are accessed from the enlisted population through a competitive accession board of officers. That board of officers make a recommendation to The Judge Advocate General using an order of merit list of recommended selections, The Judge Advocate General has final authority on the process. To be considered by the board, they must have at least an associate degree; five years experience as a paralegal (MOS 27D); recommendations from their staff judge advocate, legal administrator and their senior/chief paralegal; and completion of several correspondence courses. Once accessed, the warrant officer candidate will complete 4–6 weeks of warrant officer candidate school at the Warrant Officer Career College located at Fort Rucker, Alabama. Their follow-on schooling will be at The Judge Advocate General's Legal Center and School, Charlottesville, VA for 6 weeks.

JAG Corps enlisted paralegals must earn qualifying scores on the ASVAB, and be able to maintain a SECRET security clearance.

== Insignia ==
The branch insignia consists of a gold quill crossed above a gold sword, superimposed over a laurel wreath. The pen signifies the recording of testimony, the sword represents the military character of the JAG Corps, and the wreath indicates honor. The insignia was created in May 1890 in silver and changed to gold in 1899.

The regimental distinctive insignia (commonly but erroneously referred to as a "crest") contains the branch insignia on a shield of azure (dark blue), bordered argent (silver), the regimental colors. The "1775" on the ribbon below the shields refers to the year of the Corps' establishment.

== See also ==
- United States Army Reserve Legal Command
- United States Army Trial Defense Service
- United States Army Legal Services Agency
- U.S. Army Criminal Investigation Command
- Army Court of Criminal Appeals
- U.S. Navy Judge Advocate General's Corps
- U.S. Marine Corps Judge Advocate Division
- U.S. Air Force Judge Advocate General's Corps
- U.S. Coast Guard Legal Division
- Judge Advocate General
- Military law

United Kingdom

- Judge Advocate of the Fleet
- Judge Advocate General (United Kingdom)

Canada

- Judge Advocate General (Canada)
