= United States Army Trial Defense Service =

US Army Trial Defense Service
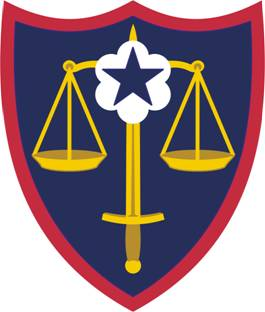
- Active: 1980 - present
- Country: United States
- Branch: United States Army
- Type: Legal
- Part of: Independent Field Operating Agency
- Garrison/HQ: Fort Belvoir, Virginia
- Motto: "Defending Those Who Defend America"

The United States Army Trial Defense Service (USATDS or TDS) is an independent Field Operating Agency within the U.S. Army Judge Advocate General's Corps and falls under the Commanding General of the U.S. Army Judge Advocate General's Legal Center and School. The TDS motto is "Defending Those Who Defend America."

A Judge Advocate Colonel heads the Trial Defense Service. The Office of the Chief, TDS, is located in Fort Belvoir in the United States Army Legal Services Agency building. TDS consists of the Chief, TDS, the Deputy Chief, the Operations and Plans Officer, the Chief of the Defense Counsel Assistance Program, the Chief of Complex Litigation, several training attorneys, a Senior Legal Administrator Warrant Officer, a Senior Enlisted Paralegal, administrative staff, and nearly 600 TDS personnel worldwide. Under the Chief of TDS, there are eight Regional Defense Counsel (RDC) responsible for overseeing defense services within a geographic region (see below). Each RDC oversees several Senior Defense Counsel (SDC), who manage field offices with the responsibility of providing defense services for a specific post, command, or area. Regions are also assigned one to two defense investigators. Some field offices oversee geographically separate branch offices.

In the USAR, each LOD has a Colonel as commander, LTC as deputy commander, a warrant officer as legal administrator, and a MSG as chief legal NCO.

AR 27-10 attaches all TDS attorneys to the Trial Defense Service with duty at a particular installation and requires the commander of the installation or organization and the respective SJA or supporting legal office to provide administrative and logistical support to defense counsel assigned to the installation, regardless of the lack of a command relationship.

The bulk of TDS is made up of U.S. Army Reserve attorneys and paralegals. The reserve component of the Trial Defense Service consists of the 16th Legal Operations Detachment, the 22nd Legal Operations Detachment and the 154th Legal Operations Detachment. The 16th LOD is responsible for reserve TDS services east of the Mississippi and north of the Mason–Dixon line, and in Germany; the 22nd LOD is responsible for reserve TDS services west of the Mississippi River, Alaska, Hawaii and South Korea; and the 154th LOD is responsible for TDS service east of the Mississippi and south of the Mason Dixon line, and in Puerto Rico. The LODs are divided into distinct regions that are spread throughout their areas of responsibility.

== Mission ==
The Trial Defense Service provides conflict-free legal services to soldiers who are facing adverse criminal or administrative actions at no cost to the soldier. Unlike public defenders in civilian jurisdictions, there is no means test required to determine eligibility; all soldiers are entitled to TDS representation by virtue of being subject to the UCMJ. The various categories of representation fall into three priorities.

- Priority 1: Criminal representation at trials by court-martial is the top priority of TDS and takes precedence over all other actions. Defense Counsel make motions, voir dire the panel, offer evidence, examine and cross-examine witnesses, present argument, and negotiate on their client's behalf.
- Priority 2: Assistance with administrative separations (actions to discharge soldiers prior to the end of their service), non-judicial punishments, and summary courts-martial.
- Priority 3: All other actions, including advising soldiers of their rights as a suspect and responding to letters of reprimand. Priority 3 actions may also be handled by legal assistance attorneys, depending on the availability of TDS.

== History ==
The former insignia of TDS.

In the U.S. Army military justice system, the main decision maker is the general court-martial convening authority (GCMCA), usually a division, post, or area commander. Each GCMCA has a Staff Judge Advocate, who serves as the legal advisor to the general. The Staff Judge Advocate also supervises a number of subordinate attorneys assigned to his or her particular unit. Collectively, the attorneys assigned to a particular command are called the Office of the Staff Judge Advocate.

Prior to the late 1970s, the duty of defense counsel was just another assignment within the Office of the Staff Judge Advocate, much like the trial counsel (military prosecutor). To some, this created the appearance of a conflict of interest when two opposing counsel worked within the same office. To others, especially some soldier clients, the fact that their defense counsel wore the same unit patch as the prosecuting attorney and worked in the same building created the impression that their attorney was on the general's side and not theirs.

Between 1978 and 1980, the U.S. Army Chief of Staff approved an experimental program to determine whether it would be feasible to create a separate command solely for U.S. Army defense counsel. The pilot program was deemed a success, and in December 1980, the Trial Defense Service was born.

Because of the limited number of TDS attorneys (even the U.S. Army's largest installation, has only about 10 TDS attorneys), the TDS organization was originally not large enough to have its own unit patch (shoulder sleeve insignia). For 25 years, the TDS "unit patch" was World War II-vintage patch of the Army Service Forces. This patch had come to be designated the Department of the Army Staff Support patch and is worn by Department of the Army field operating agencies, including the U.S. Army Safety Center and the Defense Commissary Agency. In August 2006, however, a distinctive unit patch for TDS was approved for wear. From the Institute of Heraldry's description: "The shield-shaped patch reflects the nature of legal defense work. The sword supporting scales of justice represents the unit's mission to defend soldiers at courts-martial and separations boards; seeking justice for all soldiers. The sword also signifies that Trial Defense Service personnel are soldiers as well as lawyers. The glory, mullet, and the red border are adapted from the Department of the Army Staff Support patch previously authorized for wear by the Trial Defense Service, and provides a historical link to its organizational heritage."

The former Southern Iraq TDS branch office on COB Adder in Tallil.

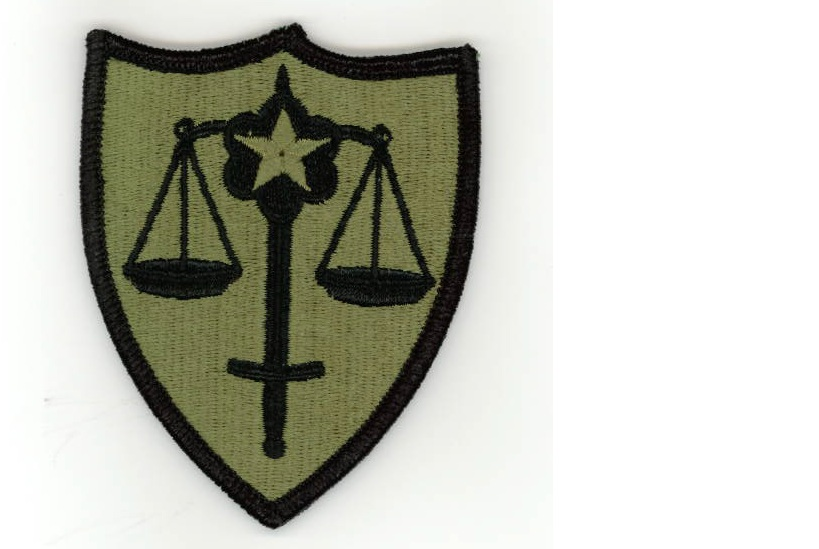
Operation Enduring Freedom Camouflage Pattern (OCP "Multicam") patch.

On Memorial Day, 28 May 2012, the U.S. Army Trial Defense Service, CENTCOM Region, officially inaugurated the U.S. Army Trial Defense Service (TDS) Operation Enduring Freedom Camouflage Pattern (OCP "Multicam") patch. The Department of the Army approved the OCP TDS patch as an official Shoulder Sleeve Insignia (SSI) for the Multicam uniform.

== TDS Regions ==
Currently, the active component of the Trial Defense Service has attorneys and paralegals stationed in nine geographic regions.

- Atlantic: Fort Drum, Fort Belvoir, Fort Eustis, United States Military Academy, Fort Gregg-Adams, Fort Meade, and Fort Myer.
- Southeast: Fort Stewart, Fort Gordon, Fort Bragg, Fort Jackson, and Hunter Army Airfield.
- Mississippi Valley: Fort Novosel, Fort Benning, Fort Knox, Fort Campbell, and Fort Johnson.
- Great Plains: Fort Leonard Wood, Fort Riley, Fort Sill, Fort Carson, and Fort Leavenworth.
- Southwest: Fort Cavazos, Fort Bliss, Fort Huachuca, and Fort Sam Houston.
- West: Fort Irwin, Joint Base Lewis-McChord, Fort Wainwright, and Fort Richardson.
- Pacific Rim: Schofield Barracks, Camp Humphreys, Yongsan Garrison, and Camp Casey.
- Europe: Vicenza, Italy; and Baumholder, Kaiserslautern, Wiesbaden, Bamberg, Katterbach, Schweinfurt, Grafenwoehr, and Vilseck, Germany.
- CENTCOM AOR: Afghanistan, and Kuwait.

Unofficial logo of Region IX TDS; Arabic for "Region 9" superimposed over DA Staff Support patch.
