= John Lee =

John Lee may refer to:

== Academia ==
- John Lee (astronomer) (1783–1866), president of the Royal Astronomical Society
- John Lee (university principal) (1779–1859), University of Edinburgh principal
- John Lee (pathologist) (born 1961), English retired pathologist and professor
- John Lee (political scientist) (born 1973), Australian political scientist and policy expert
- John Alan Lee (1933–2013), Canadian sociologist and LGBT activist
- John M. Lee (born 1950), American mathematician
- John Ning-Yuean Lee (born 1945), Taiwanese biologist
- J. R. E. Lee (1864–1944), president of Florida A&M University

== Arts and entertainment ==
- John Lee (artist) (fl. 1850–1870), British Pre-Raphaelite artist
- John Lee (author) (1931–2013), American thriller writer
- John Lee (bassist) (born 1952), American bassist, producer, recording engineer
- John Lee (blues musician) (1915–1977), American country blues guitarist, pianist, singer and songwriter
- John Lee (producer) (born 1972), co-creator of MTV2 comedy show Wonder Showzen
- John Lee (Australian actor) (1928–2000) Australian actor
- John Lee (British actor) (1725–1781), British actor
- John B. Lee (born 1951), Canadian poet
- John H. Lee (director) (born 1971), South Korean director
- John H. Lee (musician), stage name of American banjoist, composer and author John D. Haley (1847–1890)
- John Rafter Lee, British actor, voice actor, and audio book narrator
- John Lee (born 1973), also known as John Threat, alias Corrupt, American computer hacker and filmmaker
- John Robert Lee (poet) (born 1948), Saint Lucian Christian poet, writer, journalist and librarian

== Politics ==
=== U.S. ===
- John Lee (California politician) (born 1970), Los Angeles City Council member for district 12
- John Lee (Maryland politician) (1788–1871), Maryland representative in the 18th United States Congress
- John Lee (Nevada politician) (born 1955), former mayor of North Las Vegas
- John Lee (Virginia politician) (1643–1673), American planter and politician
- John C. Lee (1828–1891), Ohio lieutenant governor, 1868–1872
- John C. Lee (Alabama politician) (1856–1938), American politician from Alabama
- John Edwin Lee, member of the Mississippi House of Representatives
- John L. G. Lee (1869–1952), member and speaker of the Maryland House of Delegates

=== U.K. ===
- John Lee (1695–1761), British Member of Parliament for Newport and Malmesbury
- John Lee (Attorney-General) (1733–1793), Attorney-General for England and Wales, 1783, British MP for Higham Ferrers and Clitheroe
- John Lee Lee (1802–1874), British Member of Parliament for Wells
- John Lee (Labour politician) (1927–2020), Labour Party Member of Parliament for Reading
- John Lee, Baron Lee of Trafford (born 1942), former Minister and Conservative Member of Parliament for Pendle
- John Lee (by 1491–1542 or later), MP for Cumberland in 1529
- John Lee (by 1526–60 or later), MP for Cumberland in 1554
- John Lee (died 1558), MP for Sandwich
- John Lee (MP for New Woodstock) (c. 1535-c. 1603), MP for New Woodstock

=== Elsewhere ===
- John Lee (Australian politician) (1885–1957), New South Wales state politician
- John Lee (Canadian politician) (1845–1915)
- John Lee Ka-chiu (born 1957), Chief Executive of Hong Kong and former police officer
- J. J. Lee (historian) (born 1942), Irish historian, former senator and professor
- John A. Lee (1891–1982), New Zealand politician

== Sports ==
=== American football ===
- John Lee (defensive lineman) (1953-2024), American football player
- John Lee (placekicker) (born 1964), Korean player of American football
- John P. Lee, American college football coach from 1891 to 1893

=== Other sports ===
- John Lee (cricketer) (1825–1903), English clergyman and cricketer
- John Lee (footballer, born 1869) (1869–?), English footballer
- John Lee (footballer, born 1889) (1889–?), English footballer
- John Lee (rower) (born 1948), Australian Olympic rower
- John Lee (hurler) (born 1986), plays for the Galway senior hurling team
- John W. Lee, British middle-distance runner
- John Lee, racing driver in the 1991 British Formula Three season and 1992 season
- John Lee, ice dancing partner of Naomi Lang at the 1995 U.S. Figure Skating Championships

== Other ==
- John Lee (civil servant) (born 1964), Australian civil servant
- John Lee (inventor) (1833–1907), Scottish-Canadian inventor and arms designer
- John Lee (trade unionist) (died 1963), British trade union leader
- John Lee, African American criminal lynched in 1911
- John Lee (priest) (died 1679), English Anglican priest
- John Babbacombe Lee (1864–1945), English convicted murderer noted for surviving three attempts to hang him
- John Black Lee (1924–2016), American architect
- John C. H. Lee (1887–1958), United States Army lieutenant general
- John D. Lee (1812–1877), Mormon leader executed for his part in the Mountain Meadows Massacre
- John F. Lee (1813–1884), United States Army Judge Advocate General 1849-1862 and cousin of Robert E. Lee
- John Z. Lee (born 1968), United States federal judge
- John Lee Tae-seok (1962–2010), South Korean priest and doctor

== See also ==
- Jon Lee (disambiguation)
- Jonathan Lee (disambiguation)
- Johnny Lee (disambiguation)
- Jack Lee (disambiguation)
- John Lea (disambiguation)
- John Leigh (disambiguation)
