= Jack Lee =

Jack Lee may refer to:

== Sportspeople ==
- Jack Lee (cricketer) (1902–1944), English cricketer
- Jack Lee (footballer, born 1920) (1920–1995), English footballer and cricketer
- Jack Lee (footballer, born 1998), English footballer
- Jack Lee (rugby league) (born 1988), English rugby league player
- Jack Lee (rugby union) (born 2004), New Zealand rugby union player
- Jack E. Lee (1936–2009), track announcer
- Jacky Lee (1938–2016), American football player
- Jack Lee (Australian footballer) (1878–1947), Australian rules footballer
- Jack Lee (American football) (1917–1972), American football blocking back

== Others ==
- Jack Lee (chef) (born 1970), Vietnamese-American celebrity chef
- Jack Lee (piper) (born 1957), Canadian bagpiper
- Jack Lee (film director) (1913–2002), film director, writer, editor and producer
- Jack Lee (judge) (1922–2006), Australian judge
- Jack Lee (musician) (1952–2023), American songwriter and musician
- Jack Lee (politician) (1920–2014), American politician
- Jack Lee, the WW2 nom de plume of French SAS officer Raymond Couraud
- T. Jack Lee (born 1935), Director of the NASA Marshall Space Flight Center

== See also ==
- John Lee (disambiguation)
