= Presidency of James Buchanan =

U.S. presidential administration from 1857 to 1861

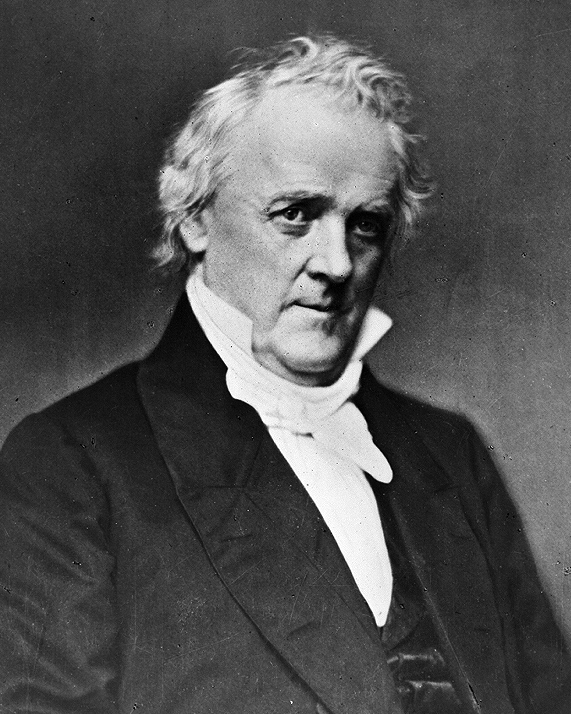
- Presidency of James Buchanan; March 4, 1857 – March 4, 1861
- Vice President: John C. Breckinridge
- Cabinet: See list
- Party: Democratic
- Election: 1856
- Seat: White House
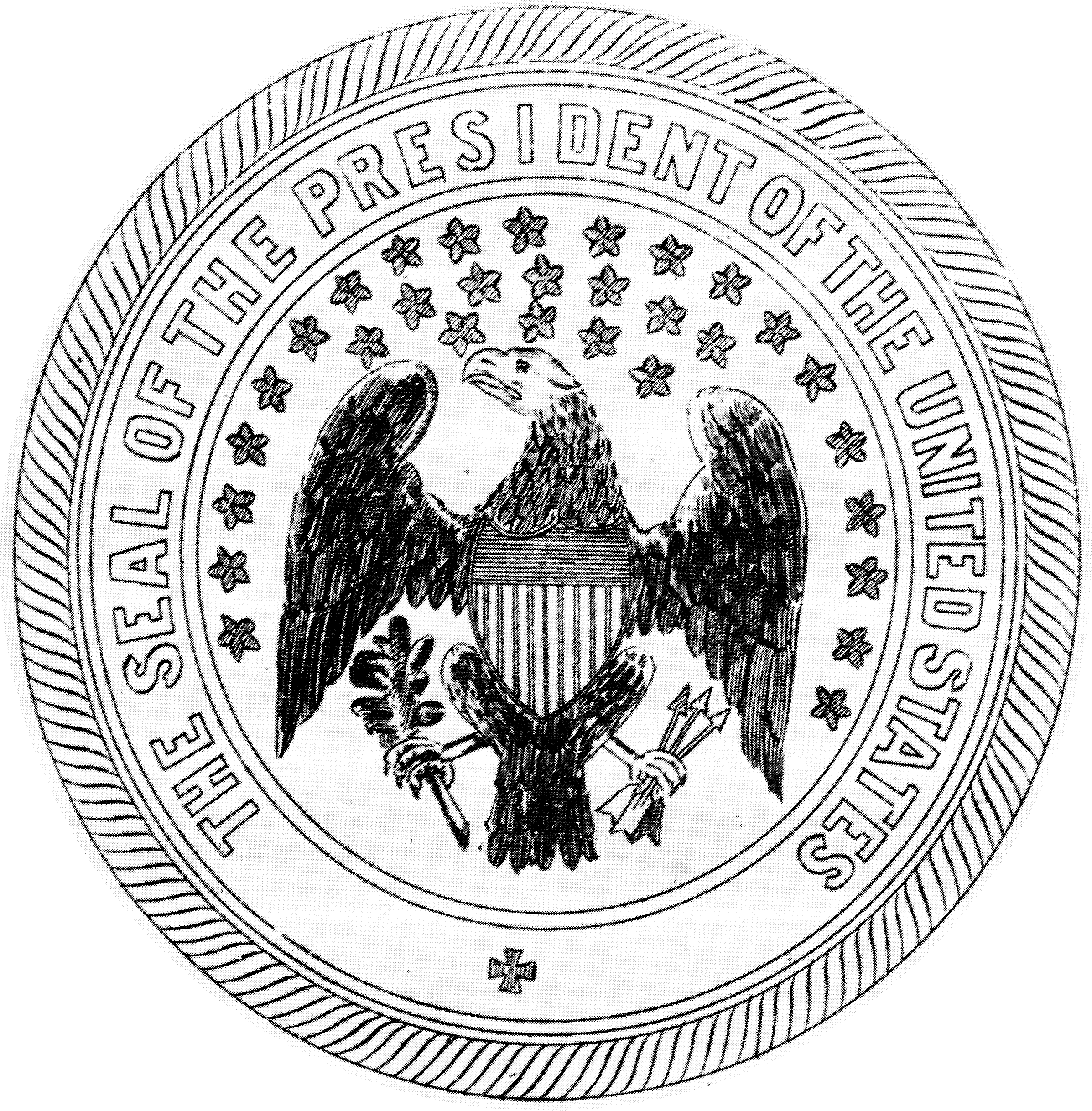
- Seal of the president (1850–1894)

James Buchanan's tenure as the 15th president of the United States began on March 4, 1857, and ended on March 4, 1861. Buchanan, a Democrat from Pennsylvania, took office after defeating the Republican candidate, John C. Frémont, and the Know Nothing candidate, former President Millard Fillmore, in the 1856 presidential election. He declined to seek re-election and was succeeded by Republican Abraham Lincoln.

Buchanan was nominated by the Democratic Party at its 1856 convention, where he defeated both the incumbent President Franklin Pierce and Illinois Senator Stephen A. Douglas. Despite his long experience in government, Buchanan was unable to calm the growing sectional crisis that would divide the nation at the close of his term. Prior to taking office, Buchanan lobbied the Supreme Court to issue a broad ruling in Dred Scott v. Sandford. Though Buchanan hoped that the Court's ruling would end the dispute over slavery in the territories, Buchanan's support of the ruling deeply alienated many Northerners. Buchanan also joined with Southern leaders in attempting to gain the admission of Kansas to the Union as a slave state under the Lecompton Constitution. In the midst of the growing chasm between slave states and free states, the Panic of 1857 struck the nation, causing widespread business failures and high unemployment.

Tensions over slavery continued to the end of Buchanan's term. Buchanan had promised in his inaugural address to serve just one term, and with the ongoing national turmoil over slavery and the nature of the Union, there was a deep yearning for fresh leadership within the Democratic Party. Republican nominee Abraham Lincoln, running on a platform devoted to keeping slavery out of all Western territories, defeated the splintered Democratic Party and Constitutional Union candidate John Bell to win the 1860 election. In response to Lincoln's victory, seven Southern states declared their secession from the Union. Buchanan refused to confront the seceded states with military force, but retained control of Fort Sumter. However, in its last two months the Buchanan Administration took a much stiffer anti-Confederate position, as Southerners resigned. The president announced that he would do all within his power to defend Fort Sumter, thereby rallying Northern support. Key anti-Confederate leaders included the new Attorney General Edwin Stanton and the new Secretary of War Joseph Holt. The secession crisis culminated in the outbreak of the American Civil War shortly after Buchanan left office. Historians condemn him for not forestalling the secession of Southern states or addressing the issue of slavery. He is consistently ranked as one of the worst presidents in American history, often being ranked as the worst president.

== Election of 1856 ==
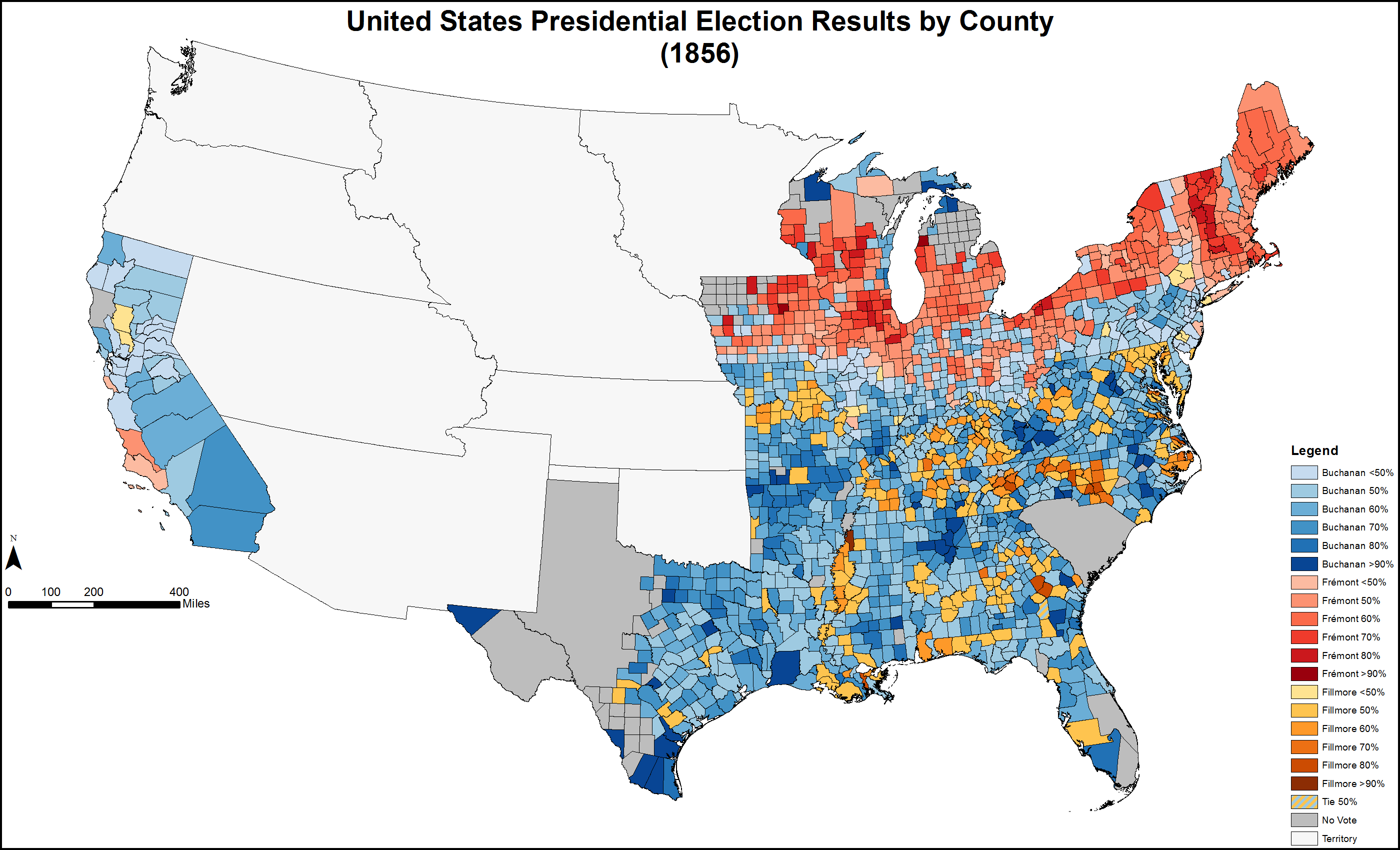
Results by county, indicating the percentage for the winning candidate. Shades of blue are for Buchanan (Democratic), shades of red are for Frémont (Republican), and shades of yellow are for Fillmore (Know Nothing).

After Franklin Pierce won the 1852 presidential election, Buchanan agreed to serve as the United States Ambassador to the United Kingdom. Buchanan's service abroad conveniently placed him outside of the country while a debate over the Kansas–Nebraska Act roiled the nation. While Buchanan did not overtly seek the 1856 Democratic presidential nomination, he deliberately chose not to discourage the movement on his behalf, something that was well within his power on many occasions. The 1856 Democratic National Convention met in June 1856, writing a platform that largely reflected Buchanan's views, including support for the Fugitive Slave Law, an end to anti-slavery agitation, and U.S. "ascendancy in the Gulf of Mexico." Buchanan led on the first ballot, boosted by the support of powerful Senators John Slidell, Jesse Bright, and James A. Bayard, who presented Buchanan as an experienced leader who could appeal to the North and South. President Pierce and Senator Stephen A. Douglas also sought the nomination, but Buchanan was selected as the Democratic presidential nominee on the seventeenth ballot of the convention. He was joined on the Democratic ticket by John C. Breckinridge of Kentucky.

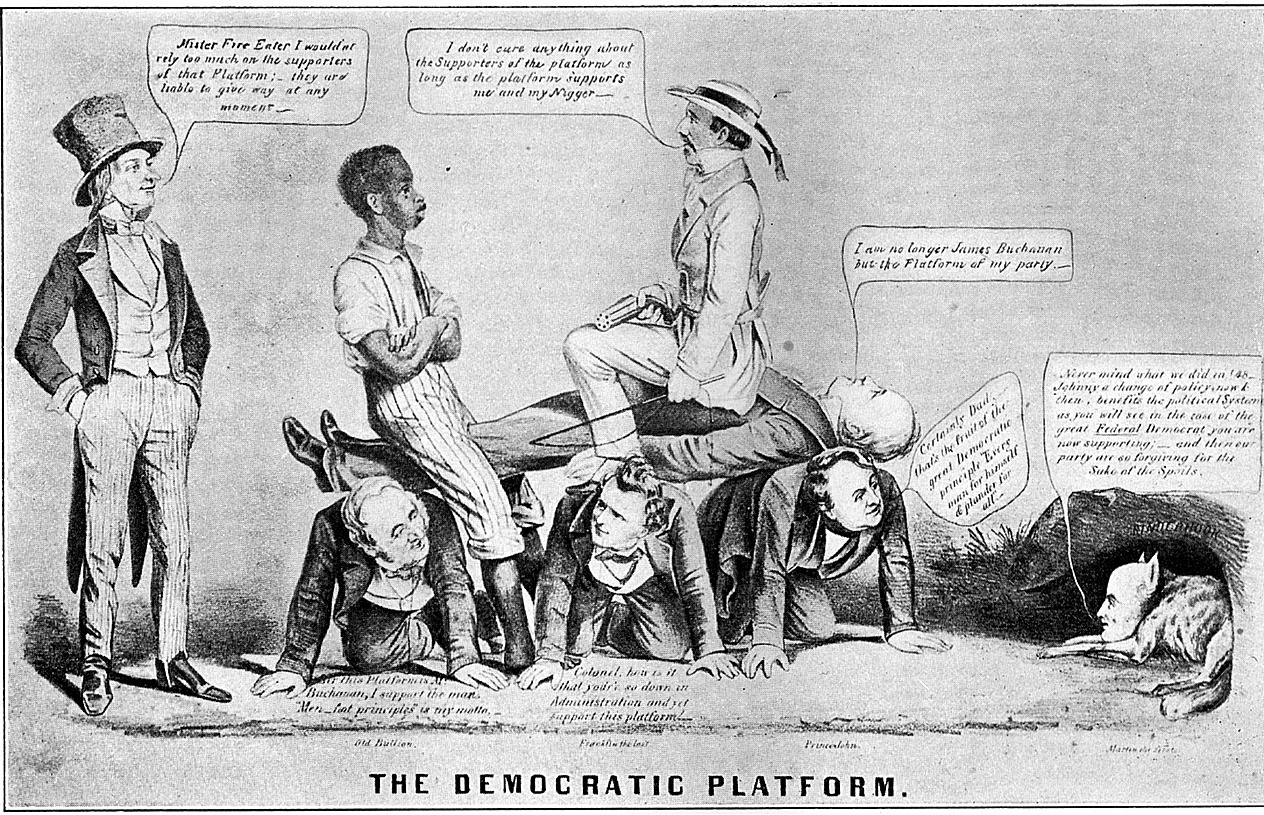
An anti-Buchanan political cartoon from the 1856 election

By 1856, the Whig Party, which had long been the main opposition to the Democrats, had collapsed. Buchanan faced not just one but two candidates in the general election: former Whig President Millard Fillmore ran as the American Party (or "Know-Nothing") candidate, while John C. Frémont ran as the Republican nominee. Much of the private rhetoric of the campaign focused on unfounded rumors regarding Frémont—talk of him as president taking charge of a large army that would support slave insurrections, the likelihood of widespread lynchings of slaves, and whispered hope among slaves for freedom and political equality.

Adhering to precedent, Buchanan did not himself campaign, but he wrote letters and pledged to uphold the Democratic platform. In the election, Buchanan carried every slave state except for Maryland, as well as five free states, including his home state of Pennsylvania. He won 45 percent of the popular vote and 174 electoral votes, compared to Frémont's 114 electoral votes and Fillmore's 8 electoral votes. In his victory speech, Buchanan denounced Republicans, calling the Republican Party a "dangerous" and "geographical" party that had unfairly attacked the South. President-elect Buchanan would also state, "the object of my administration will be to destroy sectional party, North or South, and to restore harmony to the Union under a national and conservative government."

== Inauguration ==
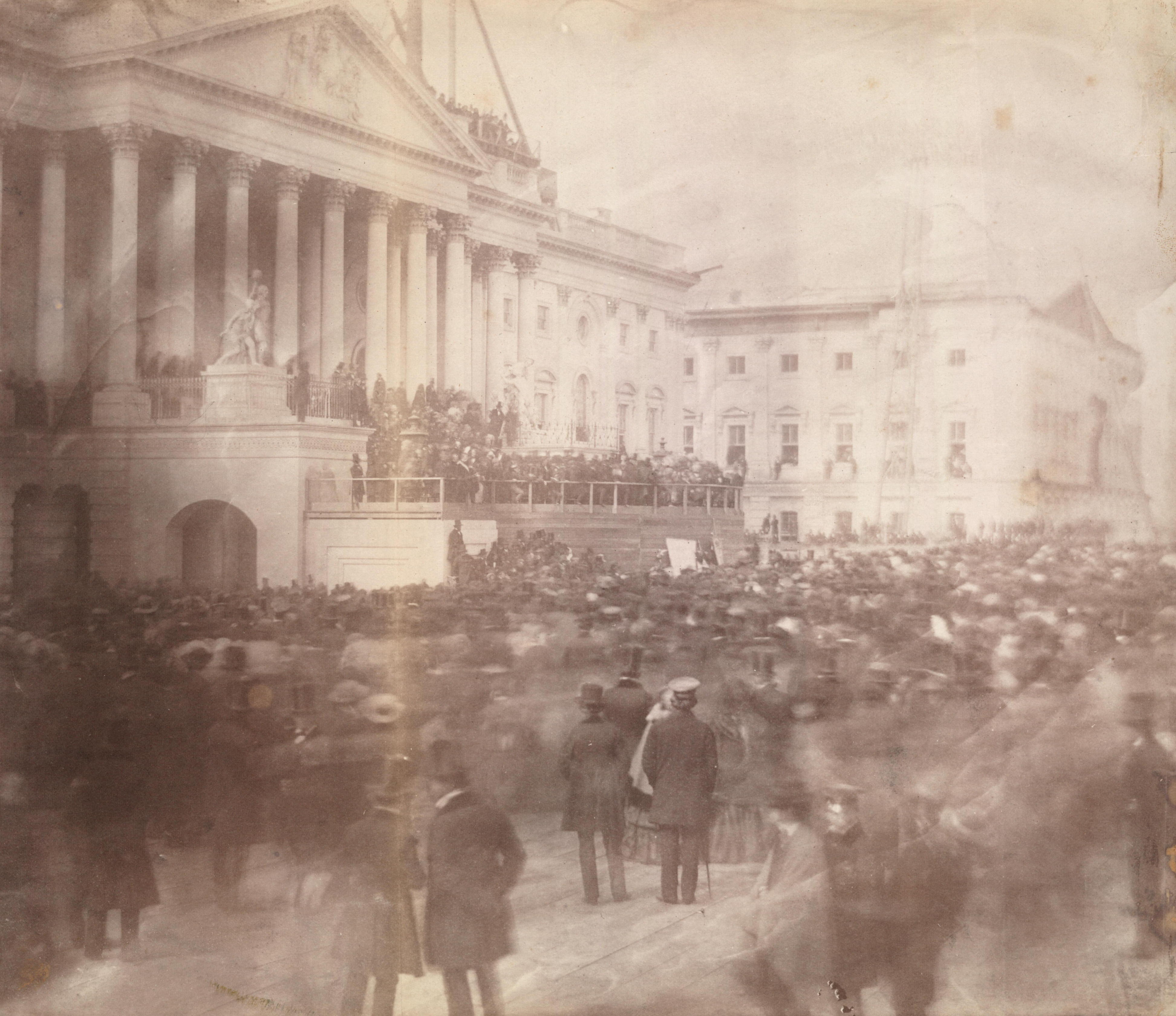
Photograph of James Buchanan's 1857 presidential inauguration at the U.S. Capitol; earliest known inaugural photograph.

Buchanan was inaugurated as the nation's 15th president on March 4, 1857, on the East Portico of the United States Capitol. Chief Justice Roger Taney administered the Oath of office. This is the first inauguration ceremony known to have been photographed. In his inaugural address, Buchanan committed himself to serving only one term. He also spoke critically about the growing divisions over slavery and its status in the territories, stating,

"It is the imperative and indispensable duty of the government of the United States to secure to every resident inhabitant the free and independent expression of his opinion by his vote. This sacred right of each individual must be preserved. That being accomplished, nothing can be fairer than to leave the people of a territory free from all foreign interference to decide their own destiny for themselves, subject only to the Constitution of the United States."

Furthermore, Buchanan argued that a federal slave code should protect the rights of slave owners in any federal territory. He alluded to a pending Supreme Court case, Dred Scott v. Sandford, which he stated would permanently settle the issue of slavery.

Buchanan already knew the outcome of the case and had even played a part in its disposition. Associate Justice Robert C. Grier leaked the decision of the "Dred Scott" case early to Buchanan. In his inaugural address Buchanan declared that the issue of slavery in the territories would be "speedily and finally settled" by the Supreme Court. According to historian Paul Finkelman:

Buchanan already knew what the Court was going to decide. In a major breach of Court etiquette, Justice Grier, who, like Buchanan, was from Pennsylvania, had kept the President-elect fully informed about the progress of the case and the internal debates within the Court. When Buchanan urged the nation to support the decision, he already knew what Taney would say. Republican suspicions of impropriety turned out to be fully justified.

Historians agree that the address was a major disaster for Buchanan as the Dred Scott decision dramatically inflamed tensions leading to the Civil War. In 2022 historian David W. Blight argues that the year 1857 was, "the great pivot on the road to disunion...largely because of the Dred Scott case, which stoked the fear, distrust and conspiratorial hatred already common in both the North and the South to new levels of intensity."

== Administration ==
Buchanan cabinet
Office	Name	Term
President	James Buchanan	1857–1861
Vice President	John C. Breckinridge	1857–1861
Secretary of State	Lewis Cass	1857–1860
Jeremiah S. Black	1860–1861
Secretary of the Treasury	Howell Cobb	1857–1860
Philip Francis Thomas	1860–1861
John Adams Dix	1861
Secretary of War	John B. Floyd	1857–1860
Joseph Holt	1861
Attorney General	Jeremiah S. Black	1857–1860
Edwin Stanton	1860–1861
Postmaster General	Aaron V. Brown	1857–1859
Joseph Holt	1859–1860
Horatio King	1861
Secretary of the Navy	Isaac Toucey	1857–1861
Secretary of the Interior	Jacob Thompson	1857–1861

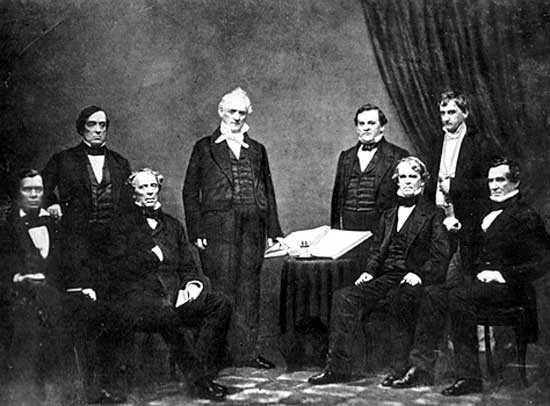
President Buchanan and his Cabinet From left to right: Jacob Thompson, Lewis Cass, John B. Floyd, James Buchanan, Howell Cobb, Isaac Toucey, Joseph Holt and Jeremiah S. Black, (c. 1859)

As his inauguration approached, Buchanan sought to establish a harmonious cabinet that would not fall victim to the in-fighting that had plagued Andrew Jackson's top officials. One of his closest advisers—who was named ambassador to Britain—was Jehu Glancy Jones.

Buchanan sought to be the clear leader of the cabinet, and chose men who would agree with his views. Anticipating that his administration would concentrate on foreign policy and that Buchanan himself would largely direct foreign policy, he appointed the aging Lewis Cass as Secretary of State. Cass would become marginalized in Buchanan's administration, with Buchanan and Assistant Secretary of State John Appleton instead directing foreign affairs. In filling out his cabinet, Buchanan chose four Southerners and three Northerners, one of whom was Secretary of the Navy Isaac Toucey, widely considered to be a "doughface", or Southern-sympathizer. Aside from the nearly-senile Cass, only Attorney General Jeremiah S. Black lacked partiality towards the South, but Black despised abolitionists and free-soilers.

=== Battling Stephen Douglas of Illinois ===
Buchanan's appointment of Southerners and Southern sympathizers alienated many in the North, and his failure to appoint any followers of Stephen Douglas divided the party. Though Buchanan owed his nomination to Douglas's decision to withdraw from consideration at the 1856 Democratic convention, he disliked Douglas personally. He favored Jesse D. Bright, who hoped to unseat Douglas as the leader of the Midwestern Democrats. Outside of the cabinet, Buchanan left in place many of Pierce's appointments but removed a disproportionate number of Northerners who had ties to Pierce or Douglas. Buchanan quickly alienated his vice president, Breckinridge, who played little role in the Buchanan administration.

Buchanan and his allies in Congress worked systematically to undermine Douglas. By 1860 they had weakened his influence in the party; they had stripped away his patronage and removed him from the powerful chairmanship of the Committee on Territories. He was much weaker inside the Senate than before. Nevertheless, Douglas had a powerful base outside Washington in the northern wing of the Democratic Party that was increasingly hostile to the president and his southern supporters. Douglas's debates with Lincoln in 1858 drew national attention, with Democrats reading the debates and hailing Douglas as the victor, allowing him to emerge as the favorite to win the party nomination for president in 1860.

== Judicial appointments ==
Buchanan appointed one Justice to the Supreme Court of the United States, Nathan Clifford of Maine. Clifford had served with Buchanan in James K. Polk's cabinet, and his views on major issues largely aligned with those of Buchanan. Clifford succeeded Benjamin Robbins Curtis, who had resigned in protest of the Dred Scott decision. Clifford's nomination was opposed by many Northern senators, but he won confirmation in a 26-to-23 vote. A second vacancy arose after the death of Peter Vivian Daniel in 1860, and Buchanan nominated Attorney General Black to fill the opening. In the aftermath of the election of 1860, Black fell just one vote short of confirmation, leaving one Supreme Court seat open as Buchanan left office. Aside from Clifford, Buchanan appointed only seven other Article III federal judges, all to United States district courts.

== Domestic affairs ==
=== Debate over slavery and Dred Scott case ===
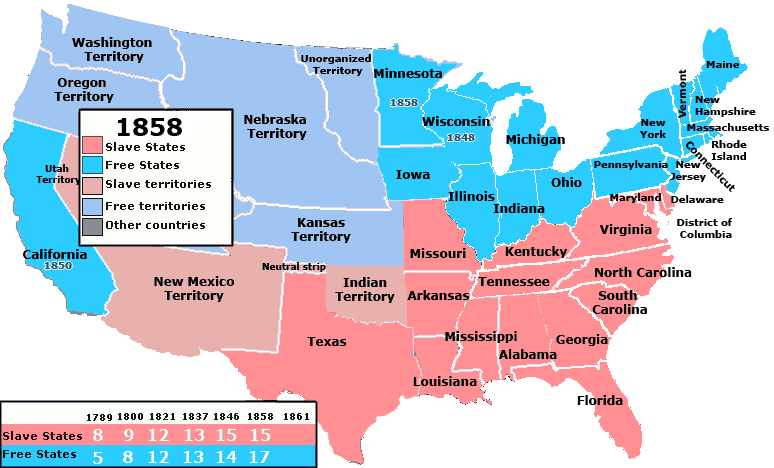
The balance of free and slave states in 1858, after the admission of Minnesota

In the aftermath of the Mexican–American War, a new debate had arisen over the status of slavery in the western territories. While abolitionism had not emerged as a strong force, many Northerners saw slavery as a moral blight and opposed the extension of slavery into the territories. Many Southerners, meanwhile, were deeply offended by the moral assault on the institution of slavery and feared that an attack on slavery in the territories could lead to an attack on slavery in the South. The Compromise of 1850 had temporarily defused the situation, but every Northern defiance of the Fugitive Slave Act (passed as part of the compromise) inflamed tensions in the South. The 1852 publication of Uncle Tom's Cabin further divided opinion. In 1854, the Kansas–Nebraska Act repealed the Missouri Compromise, which had excluded slavery from territories north of the 36°30′ parallel. Each new state would instead decide upon the status of slavery under the concept of popular sovereignty. The bill was very unpopular in the North, and its passage contributed to the collapse of the Whig Party and the rise of the Republican Party, which consisted almost entirely of Northerners opposed to the expansion of slavery into the territories. Though few Republicans sought to abolish slavery in the South, Southerners saw the very existence of the Republican Party as an affront, and the Republicans made little effort to appeal to the South with any of their other policies, such as support for high tariffs and federally-funded internal improvements.

Upon taking office, Buchanan hoped to not only end the tensions over slavery but also vanquish what he saw as a dangerously sectional Republican Party. The most pressing issue regarding slavery was its status in the territories, and whether popular sovereignty meant that territorial legislatures could bar the entrance of slaves. Seeing an opening in a pending Supreme Court case to settle the issue, President-Elect Buchanan had involved himself in the decision-making process of the Court in the months leading up to his own inauguration.

Two days after Buchanan's inauguration, Chief Justice Taney delivered the Dred Scott decision, which asserted that Congress had no constitutional power to exclude slavery in the territories. Prior to his inauguration, Buchanan had written to Justice John Catron in January 1857, inquiring about the outcome of the case and suggesting that a broader decision would be more prudent. Catron, who was from Tennessee, replied on February 10 that the Supreme Court's Southern majority would decide against Scott, but would likely have to publish the decision on narrow grounds if there was no support from the Court's northern justices—unless Buchanan could convince his fellow Pennsylvanian, Justice Robert Cooper Grier, to join the majority. Buchanan hoped that a broad Supreme Court decision protecting slavery in the territories could lay the issue to rest once and for all, allowing the country to focus on other issues, including the possible annexation of Cuba and the acquisition of more Mexican territory. So Buchanan wrote to Grier and successfully prevailed upon him, allowing the majority leverage to issue a broad-ranging decision that transcended the specific circumstances of Scott's case to declare the Missouri Compromise unconstitutional. When the Court's decision in Dred Scott was issued two days after Buchanan's inauguration, Republicans began spreading word that Taney had revealed to Buchanan the forthcoming result. Buchanan's strong public support of the decision earned him and his party the enmity of many Northerners from the outset of his presidency.

=== Panic of 1857 and economic policy ===
The Panic of 1857 began in the middle of that year, ushered in by the sequential collapse of fourteen hundred state banks and five thousand businesses. While the South escaped largely unscathed, Northern cities saw numerous unemployed men and women take to the streets to beg. Reflecting his Jacksonian background, Buchanan's response was "reform not relief". While the government was "without the power to extend relief", it would continue to pay its debts in specie, and while it would not curtail public works, none would be added. Buchanan urged the states to restrict the banks to a credit level of $3 to $1 of specie, and discouraged the use of federal or state bonds as security for bank note issues. Though the economy recovered by 1859, the panic inflamed sectional tensions, as many Northerners blamed the Southern-backed Tariff of 1857 (passed during Pierce's last day in office) for the panic. Southerners, as well as Buchanan, instead blamed the over-speculation of Northern bankers. In part due to the worsened economy, by the time Buchanan left office the federal deficit stood at $17 million, higher than it had been when Buchanan took office.

Throughout 1858 and 1859, Congress continued to debate perennial issues such as the tariff and infrastructure spending. Southern and Western congressmen succeeded in retaining the low rates of the Tariff of 1857 until 1861. Many in Congress pushed for the construction of a transcontinental railroad, but its construction was prevented by a combination of Southern and New England congressmen. Among the pieces of legislation that Buchanan vetoed were the Homestead Act, which would have given 160 acres of public land to settlers who remained on settled land for five years, and the Morrill Act, which would have granted public lands to establish land-grant colleges. Buchanan argued that these acts were beyond the power of the federal government as established by the Constitution. Following the secession of several Southern states, Congress passed the Morrill Tariff, significantly raising rates. Despite his long opposition to higher tariffs, Buchanan signed the tariff into law on March 2, 1861. The Morrill Tariff raised the tariff to the highest levels seen since the 1840s, and passage of the law marked a new period of protectionist tariffs that would continue long after Buchanan left office.

=== Utah War ===
Utah had been settled by Mormons in the decades preceding Buchanan's presidency, and under the leadership of Brigham Young the Mormons had grown increasingly hostile to federal intervention. Young harassed federal officers and discouraged outsiders from settling in the Salt Lake City area, and in September 1857 the Utah Territorial Militia perpetrated the Mountain Meadows massacre against Arkansans headed for California. Buchanan was also personally offended by the polygamous behavior of Young.

Accepting the wildest rumors and believing the Mormons to be in open rebellion against the United States, Buchanan sent the army in November 1857 to replace Young as governor with the non-Mormon Alfred Cumming. While the Mormons had frequently defied federal authority, some question whether Buchanan's action was a justifiable or prudent response to uncorroborated reports. Complicating matters, Young's notice of his replacement was not delivered because the Pierce administration had annulled the Utah mail contract. After Young reacted to the military action by mustering a two-week expedition destroying wagon trains, oxen, and other Army property, Buchanan dispatched Thomas L. Kane as a private agent to negotiate peace. The mission succeeded, the new governor was shortly placed in office, and the Utah War ended. The president granted amnesty to all inhabitants who would respect the authority of the government, and moved the federal troops to a nonthreatening distance for the balance of his administration. Though he continued to practice polygamy, Young largely accepted federal authority after the conclusion of the Utah War.

=== Bleeding Kansas ===
After the passage of the Kansas–Nebraska Act in 1854, two competing governments had been formed in Kansas Territory. The anti-slavery settlers organized a government in Topeka, while pro-slavery settlers established a seat of government in Lecompton, Kansas. For Kansas to be admitted as a state, a constitution had to be submitted to Congress with the approval of a majority of residents. Under President Pierce, a series of violent confrontations known as "Bleeding Kansas" occurred as supporters of the two governments clashed. The situation in Kansas was watched closely throughout the country, and some in Georgia and Mississippi advocated secession should Kansas be admitted as a free state. Buchanan himself did not particularly care whether or not Kansas entered as a slave state, and instead sought to admit Kansas as a state as soon as possible since it would likely tilt towards the Democratic Party. Rather than restarting the process and establishing one territorial government, Buchanan chose to recognize the pro-slavery Lecompton government. In his first Annual Message to Congress, in December 1857, he urged that Kansas be admitted as a slave state under the Lecompton Constitution.

Historians have taken one of two approaches to the Kansas policy. Allan Nevins presents a "melodramatic" interpretation. He argues that Buchanan honestly wanted a constitution ratified by genuine residents. His firmness weakened in the face of pro-Southern factions in his cabinet and party and he retreated. Roy Nichols takes a "legalist" approach arguing that Buchanan only submitted one issue, slavery itself, to the voters. But he became distracted by the financial panic of 1857 and accepted the Lecompton Constitution. Nevins and Nichols agree on Buchanan's weak leadership, but offer subtle variations on how Buchanan tried to hold the middle ground by accepting a de facto slavery settlement.

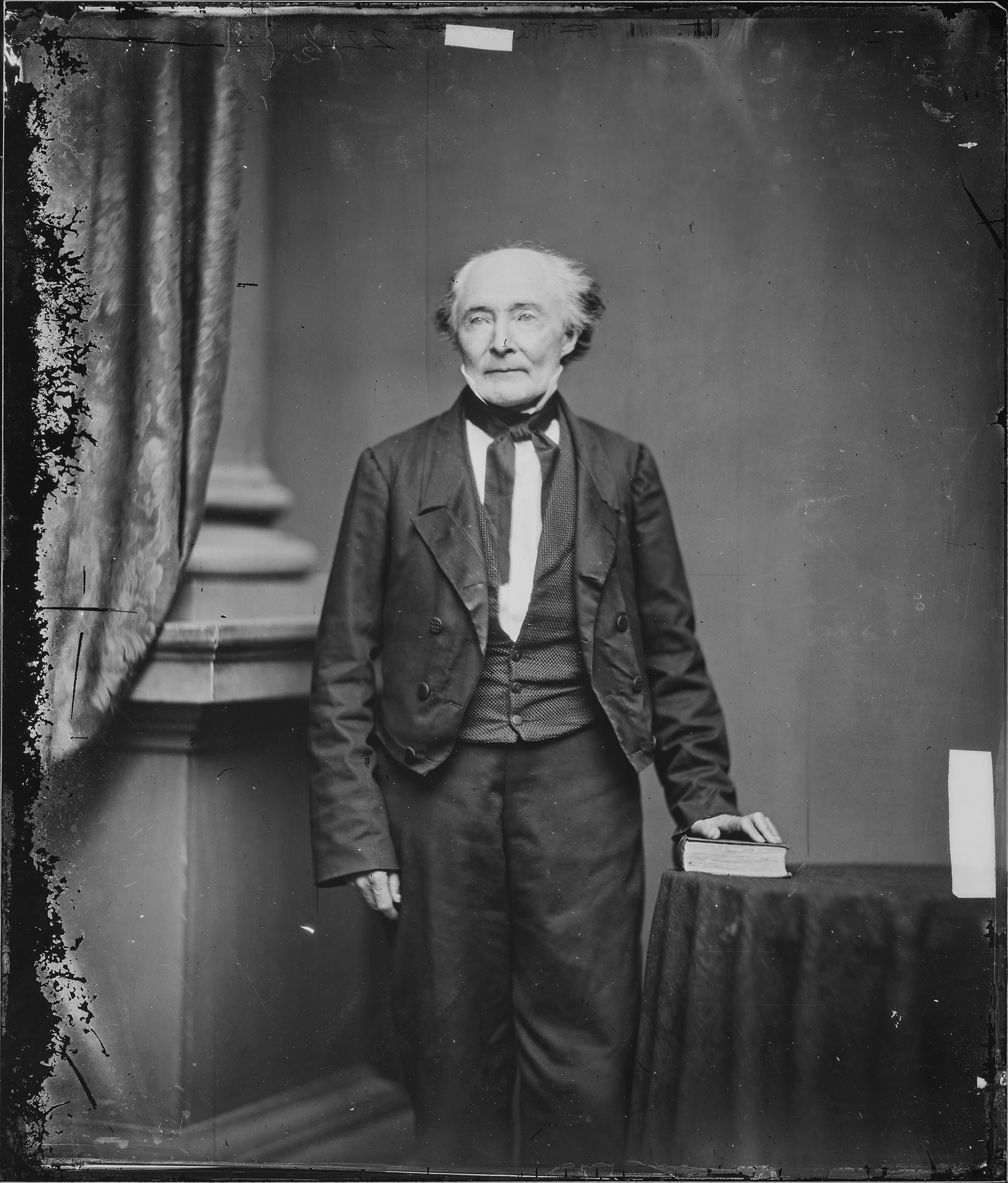
Robert J. Walker, whom Buchanan appointed as Territorial Governor of Kansas

Upon taking office, Buchanan appointed Robert J. Walker to replace John W. Geary as territorial governor of Kansas, with the mission of reconciling the settler factions and approving a constitution. Walker, who was from the slave state of Mississippi, was expected to assist the pro-slavery faction in gaining approval of a new constitution. Buchanan overcame Walker's initial reluctance to accept the appointment by persuading Walker that a successful resolution to the Kansas issue could catapult Walker to the presidency in 1860. Buchanan also promised Walker that Kansas would hold a free and fair referendum on any state constitution. Shortly after arriving in Kansas, Walker remarked that an "isothermal line" (i.e. the climate) had made Kansas unsuitable to slavery, angering pro-slavery leaders in Kansas and across the United States. In October 1857, the Lecompton government organized territorial elections that resulted in a pro-slavery legislature, despite Walker's discovery of fraud in several counties.

The convention framed a pro-slavery state constitution (known as the "Lecompton Constitution") and, rather than risking a referendum, sent it directly to Buchanan. Though eager for Kansas statehood, even Buchanan was forced to reject the entrance of Kansas without a state constitutional referendum, and he dispatched federal agents to bring about a compromise. The Lecompton government agreed to a limited referendum in which Kansas would vote not on the constitution overall, but rather merely on whether or not Kansas would allow slavery after becoming a state. The anti-slavery Topeka government boycotted the December 1857 referendum, in which slavery overwhelmingly won the approval of those who did vote. A month later, the Topeka government held its own referendum in which voters overwhelmingly rejected the Lecompton Constitution.

Despite the protests of Walker and two former governors of Kansas, Buchanan decided to accept the Lecompton Constitution. In a December 1857 meeting with Stephen Douglas, the chairman of the Senate Committee on Territories and an important Northern Democrat, Buchanan demanded that all Democrats support the administration's position of admitting Kansas under the Lecompton Constitution. Facing re-election and outraged by the perceived fraud in Kansas, Douglas broke with Buchanan and attacked the Lecompton Constitution. On February 2, Buchanan transmitted the Lecompton Constitution to Congress. He also transmitted a message that attacked the "revolutionary government" in Topeka, conflating them with the Mormons in Utah. Buchanan made every effort to secure congressional approval, offering favors, patronage appointments, and even cash for votes. The Lecompton Constitution won the approval of the Senate in March, but a combination of Know-Nothings, Republicans, and Northern Democrats defeated the bill in the House. Rather than accepting defeat, Buchanan backed the English Bill, which offered Kansans immediate statehood and vast public lands in exchange for accepting the Lecompton Constitution. Despite the continued opposition of Douglas, the English bill won passage in both houses of Congress.

Despite congressional approval of the constitution, Kansas voters strongly rejected the Lecompton Constitution in an August 1858 referendum. Southerners were outraged that the Lecompton Constitution had been defeated by a supposed Northern conspiracy led by Douglas, while many Northerners now saw Buchanan as a tool of the Southern "Slave Power." Anti-slavery delegates won a majority of the elections to the 1859 state constitutional convention, and Kansas won admission as a free state in the final months of Buchanan's presidency; the Southern senators blocking a free Kansas had withdrawn, because their states had seceded. Guerrilla warfare in the state would continue throughout Buchanan's presidency and extend into the 1860s, when it became a relatively minor theater of the wider American Civil War.

The battle over Kansas escalated into a battle for control of the Democratic Party. On one side were Buchanan, most Southern Democrats, and "doughface" Northern Democrats; on the other side were Douglas and most Northern Democrats, as well as a few Southerners. Douglas's faction continued to support the doctrine of popular sovereignty, while Buchanan insisted that Democrats respect the Dred Scott decision and its repudiation of federal interference with slavery in the territories. The struggle lasted the remainder of Buchanan's presidency. Buchanan used his patronage powers to remove Douglas' sympathizers in favor of pro-administration Democrats.

=== Continuing tensions over slavery ===
Following the 1858 elections, Senator Jefferson Davis of Mississippi and fellow Southern radicals sought to pass a federal slave code that would protect slavery in the territories, thereby closing the loophole contemplated by Douglas's Freeport Doctrine. In February 1859, as debate over the federal slave code began, Davis and other Southerners announced that they would leave the party if the 1860 party platform included popular sovereignty, while Douglas and his supporters likewise stated that they would bolt the party if the party platform included a federal slave code. Despite this continuing debate over slavery in the territories, the decline of Kansas as a major issue allowed unionists to remain a powerful force in the South.

In October 1859, abolitionist John Brown led a raid on a federal armory in Harpers Ferry, Virginia, in hopes of initiating a slave revolt. Brown's plan failed miserably, and the majority of his party was killed or captured. In the aftermath of the attack, Republican leaders denied any connection to Brown, who was executed in December 1859 by the state of Virginia. Though few leaders in the North approved of Brown's actions, Southerners were outraged, and many accused Republican leaders such as Seward of having masterminded the raid. In his December 1859 annual message to Congress, Buchanan characterized the raid as part of an "open war by the North to abolish slavery in the South", and he called for the establishment of a federal slave code. Senate hearings led by Senator James Murray Mason of Virginia cleared the Republican Party of responsibility for the raid after a long investigation, but Southern Congressmen remained suspicious of their Republican colleagues.

=== Covode committee ===
Buchanan and his allies awarded no-bid contracts to political supporters, used government money to wage political campaigns and bribe judges, and sold government property for less than its worth to cronies. According to historian Michael F. Holt, the Buchanan administration was "undoubtedly the most corrupt [administration] before the Civil War and one of the most corrupt in American history." In March 1860, the House created the Covode Committee to investigate the administration for evidence of corruption, bribery, and extortion. The committee, with three Republicans and two Democrats, was accused by Buchanan's supporters of being nakedly partisan; they also charged its chairman, Republican Congressman John Covode, with acting on a personal grudge due to Buchanan's veto of a land grant bill for agricultural colleges. Despite this criticism, the Democratic committee members, as well as Democratic witnesses, were equally enthusiastic in their pursuit of Buchanan as were the Republicans.

The committee was unable to establish grounds for impeaching Buchanan; however, the majority report issued on June 17 exposed corruption and abuse of power among members of his cabinet, as well as allegations (if not impeachable evidence) from the Republican members of the committee, that Buchanan had attempted to bribe members of Congress in connection with the Lecompton constitution. The Democratic report, issued separately the same day, pointed out that evidence was scarce, but did not refute the allegations; one of the Democratic members, Rep. James Robinson, stated publicly that he agreed with the Republican report even though he did not sign it. Buchanan claimed to have "passed triumphantly through this ordeal" with complete vindication. Nonetheless, Republican operatives distributed thousands of copies of the Covode Committee report throughout the nation as campaign material in that year's presidential election.

== Foreign policy ==
Buchanan entered the White House with an ambitious foreign policy centered around establishing U.S. hegemony over Central America at the expense of Great Britain. He hoped to re-negotiate the Clayton–Bulwer Treaty, signed between the U.S. and Britain in 1850, which he viewed as a mistake that limited U.S. influence in the region. He also sought to establish American protectorates over the Mexican states of Chihuahua and Sonora, partly to serve as a destination for Mormons. Aware of the decrepit state of the Spanish Empire, he hoped to finally achieve his long-term goal of acquiring Cuba, where state slavery still flourished, by maneuvering Spain into selling the colony to the US. After long negotiations with the British, he convinced them to agree to cede the Bay Islands to Honduras and the Mosquito Coast to Nicaragua. However, Buchanan's ambitions in Cuba and Mexico were blocked in the House of Representatives, where the anti-slavery forces strenuously opposed any move to acquire new slave territory. Buchanan also considered buying Alaska from the Russian Empire, possibly as a colony for Mormon settlers, but the U.S. and Russia were unable to agree upon a price. The Alaska Purchase would later be made in 1867, negotiated by William Seward as Secretary of State.

In China, the U.S. was neutral in the Second Opium War of 1856–58. Buchanan appointed William Bradford Reed as Minister to China in 1857–58. Reed had helped Buchanan win in 1856 by persuading old-line Whigs to support a Democrat. Reed's goal in China was to negotiate a new treaty that would win for the United States the privileges Britain and France had forced on China in the war. Reed did well in this. The Treaty of Tientsin (1858) granted American diplomats the right to reside in Peking, reduced tariff levels for American goods, and guaranteed the free exercise of religion by foreigners in China. The treaty helped set the roots of what later became Washington's Open Door Policy.

In 1858, Buchanan ordered the Paraguay expedition to punish Paraguay for firing on the USS Water Witch, which was on a scientific mission. The punitive expedition resulted in a Paraguayan apology and the payment of an indemnity.

== 1858 mid-term elections ==
Douglas's Senate term ended in 1859, so the Illinois legislature elected in 1858 would determine whether Douglas would win re-election. The Senate election was the primary issue of the legislative election, marked by the Lincoln-Douglas debates between Douglas and the Republican candidate, former Congressman Abraham Lincoln. Buchanan, working through federal patronage appointees in Illinois, ran candidates for the legislature in competition with both the Republicans and the Douglas Democrats. This could easily have thrown the election to the Republicans—which showed the depth of Buchanan's animosity toward Douglas.

In his 1858 re-election bid, Douglas defeated Lincoln, who warned that the Supreme Court would soon bar states from excluding slavery. As part of his campaign, Douglas laid out his "Freeport Doctrine", which held that territorial legislatures retained the de facto right to exclude slavery despite the Dred Scott decision, because said legislatures could refuse to recognize slavery as property. In the 1858 elections, Douglas forces took control of the Democratic Party throughout the North, except in Buchanan's home state of Pennsylvania, leaving Buchanan with a narrow base of Southern supporters. However, the Freeport Doctrine further diminished Douglas's support in the South, which was already in decline following his refusal to support the Lecompton Constitution.

The division between Northern and Southern Democrats helped the Republicans win a plurality in the House in the elections of 1858. While campaigning for a Republican congressional candidate in New York, Republican Senator William Seward described the party struggle between Republicans and Democrats as part of a larger "irrepressible conflict" between systems of free and slave labor. Though Seward quickly walked back his remarks and relatively few Northerners actually sought the immediate abolition of slavery in the South, Seward's remarks and the subsequent Republican victories in the 1858 elections caused many in the South to believe that the election of a Republican president would lead to the abolition of slavery. The election losses served as a Northern rebuke to the Buchanan administration, and Republican control of the House allowed Republicans to block much of Buchanan's agenda in the second half of his term.

== Election of 1860 ==
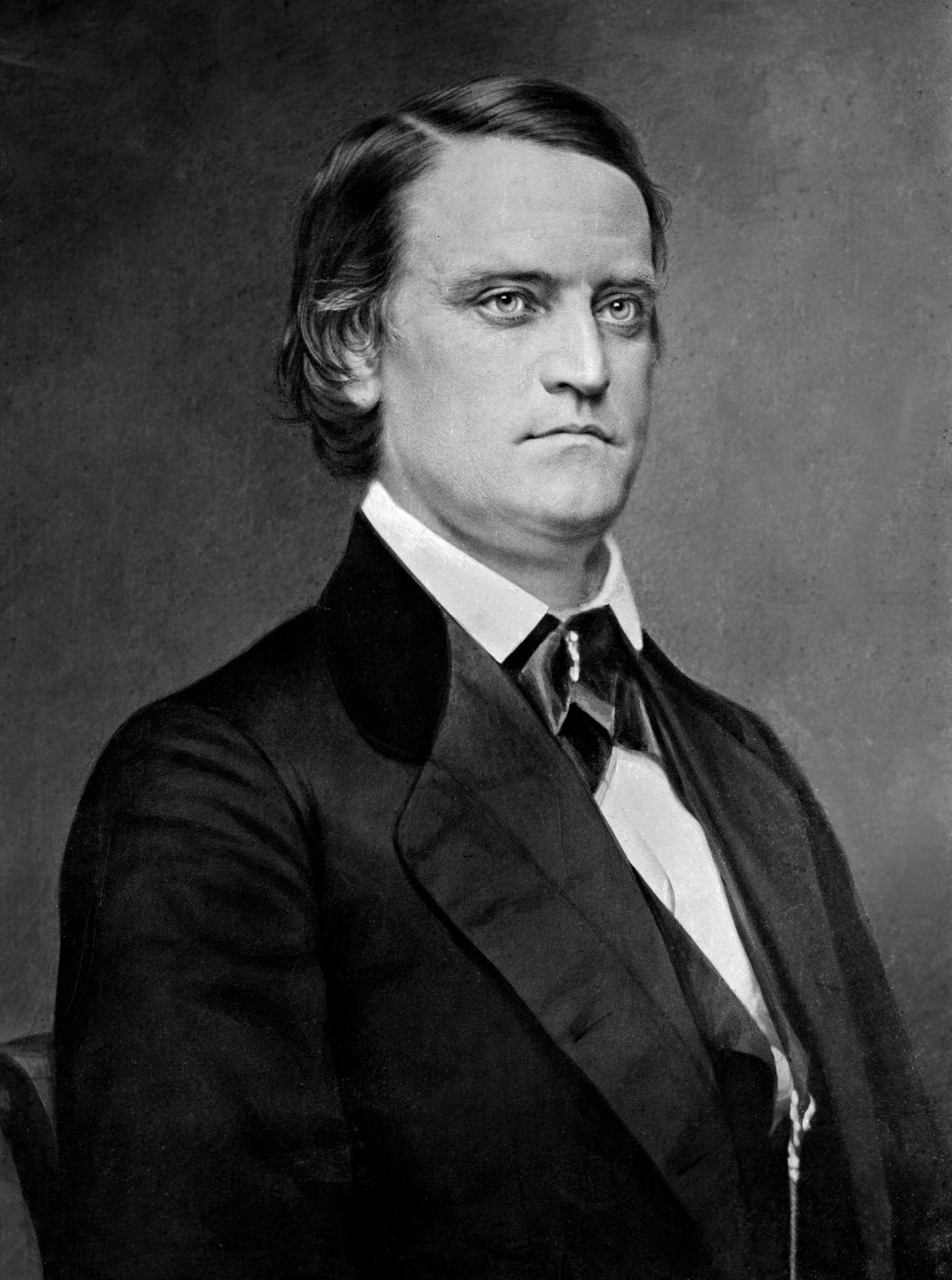
John C. Breckinridge, Vice President of the United States under Buchanan

The 1860 Democratic National Convention convened in April 1860 in Charleston, South Carolina. Buchanan had decided to stick to his pledge to serve just one term, but his administration actively sought a successor who would uphold his policies. Stephen Douglas had emerged as the most popular Northern Democratic leader after the 1858 elections, but he had alienated Buchanan and much of the South with his stance on slavery in the territories. Some Southern Democrats, especially those from the Deep South, preferred a Republican president to Douglas because the election of a Republican president would encourage secession. After a long and acrimonious fight, the convention adopted a platform favoring Douglas's conception of popular sovereignty and rejecting a federal slave code. Seven Southern delegation chairmen walked out on the convention in reaction to the party platform.

After Southern leaders bolted from the convention, Caleb Cushing, a Buchanan ally who had won election as chair of the convention, ruled that the presidential ballot would require a two-thirds majority of all delegates (including the bolters), meaning that the nominee would have to win support from five-sixths of the delegates present. After fifty-seven ballots, all of which Douglas led, the convention adjourned with plans to reconvene in June in Baltimore, Maryland. After re-convening, most of the remaining Southern delegates, as well as some Northern delegates loyal to Buchanan, left the convention after losing a vote to re-seat the delegates that had bolted in Charleston. The remaining delegates nominated Douglas for president. Douglas preferred Alexander H. Stephens as his running mate, but left the decision to the remaining Southern delegates, who eventually picked former Governor Herschel Johnson of Georgia.

The delegates who had bolted from the Charleston and Baltimore conventions met elsewhere in Baltimore. After stating that he did not believe that the South should secede if Republicans won the 1860 election, Vice President Breckinridge was nominated on the first ballot of the convention. Senator Joseph Lane of Oregon was nominated as Breckinridge's running mate. Buchanan and former President Franklin Pierce both endorsed Breckinridge and his platform, which called for the federal protection of slavery in the territories. A group of former Whigs opposed to both Breckinridge and the Republicans, and unable to reach an accommodation with Douglas, formed the Constitutional Union Party and nominated John Bell of Tennessee for president and Edward Everett of Massachusetts for vice president. The nascent party emphasized unionism and sought to push aside the issue of slavery. Though the party initially hoped to compete in both the North and the South, some Constitutional Unionists in the South endorsed a federal slave code, which destroyed the party's support in the North.

The 1860 Republican National Convention opened with five major candidates: Abraham Lincoln, William Seward, Salmon P. Chase of Ohio, Simon Cameron of Pennsylvania, and Edward Bates of Missouri. Despite Seward's lead on the first two ballots, Lincoln emerged as the party's nominee on the third ballot. Lincoln's candidacy was boosted by the widely-held view that his reputation for honesty and moderation made him a strong candidate, especially in key Northern swing states like Indiana and Illinois. For vice president, the Republicans nominated Hannibal Hamlin, a former Democrat from Maine who maintained warm relations with both Lincoln and Seward. Republicans, including Seward, rallied to Lincoln as did many former Whigs. Lincoln argued for the containment of slavery to the Southern states, but promised that Republicans would not seek to abolish slavery in the South itself. With four major candidates in the field, Buchanan hoped that not one candidate would win an electoral vote majority and the election would be thrown to the House.

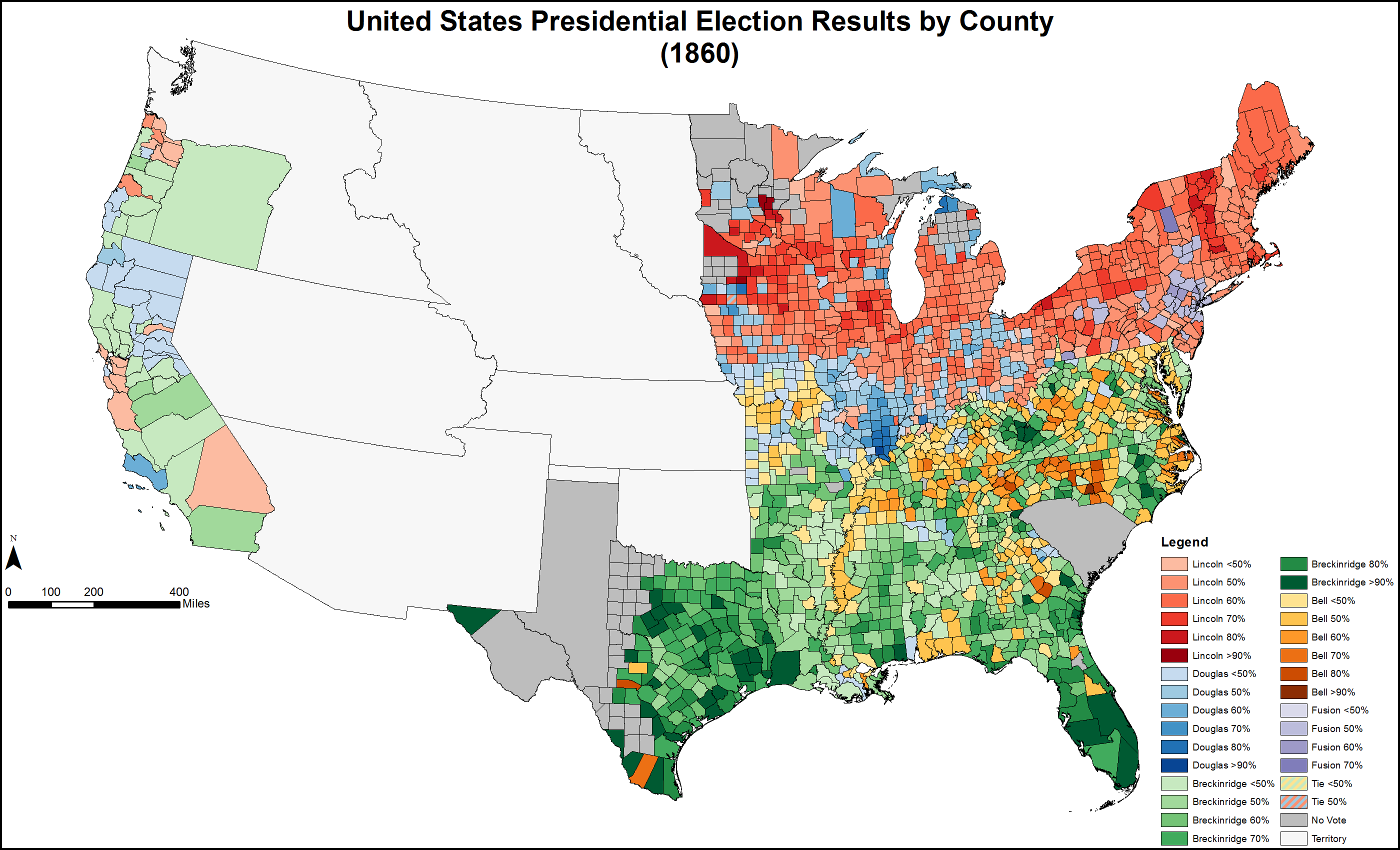
Results by county, indicating the percentage for the winning candidate. Shades of red represent Lincoln's support, shades of blue represent Douglas's support, shades of green represent Breckinridge's support, and shades of yellow represent Bell's support.

The 1860 election was essentially two races; in the North, Lincoln competed with Douglas for votes, while in the South, Breckinridge and Bell garnered the most support. Like his successful Whig predecessors, Lincoln largely refrained from campaigning after the convention, instead leaving that to others in the party. In his silence, Lincoln failed to refute the charge of Southern radicals that he hoped to abolish slavery. During the summer and fall of 1860, Southern governors corresponded about potentially seceding from the union, and Buchanan did little to denounce secessionists. Douglas, on the other hand, focused much of his campaign on attacking secessionists, who he worried would attempt to seize control of the federal government in the aftermath of a Lincoln victory. As Breckinridge and Bell lacked support in the North, the defeat of Lincoln required the victory of Douglas in at least some Northern states, but Buchanan remained focused on defeating Douglas. Some anti-Republican leaders attempted to form a fusion ticket in the North, but they achieved little success outside of New Jersey.

With the Democrats divided, Lincoln won the 1860 election with a plurality of the popular vote and a majority of the electoral vote. Lincoln won virtually no support in the South, but his strong performance over Douglas in the North gave him a majority of the electoral vote. Breckinridge won most of the South, Bell won Virginia, Kentucky, and Tennessee, and Douglas won Missouri and three electoral votes in New Jersey. Despite Lincoln's presidential victory, Republicans failed to win a majority in the House or Senate, and the Supreme Court membership remained largely the same as it had been when it issued the Dred Scott decision. Thus, despite the election of a Republican president, slavery in the South faced no immediate danger.

As early as October, the army's Commanding General, Winfield Scott, warned Buchanan that Lincoln's election would likely cause at least seven states to secede. He recommended that massive amounts of federal troops and artillery be deployed to those states to protect federal property, and warned that few reinforcements were available. Buchanan, however, distrusted Scott (the two had long been political adversaries) and ignored his recommendations. After Lincoln's election, Buchanan directed Secretary of War Floyd to reinforce southern forts with as many provisions, arms and men as were available; however, Floyd convinced him to revoke the order.

== Secession ==
=== Compromise attempts ===
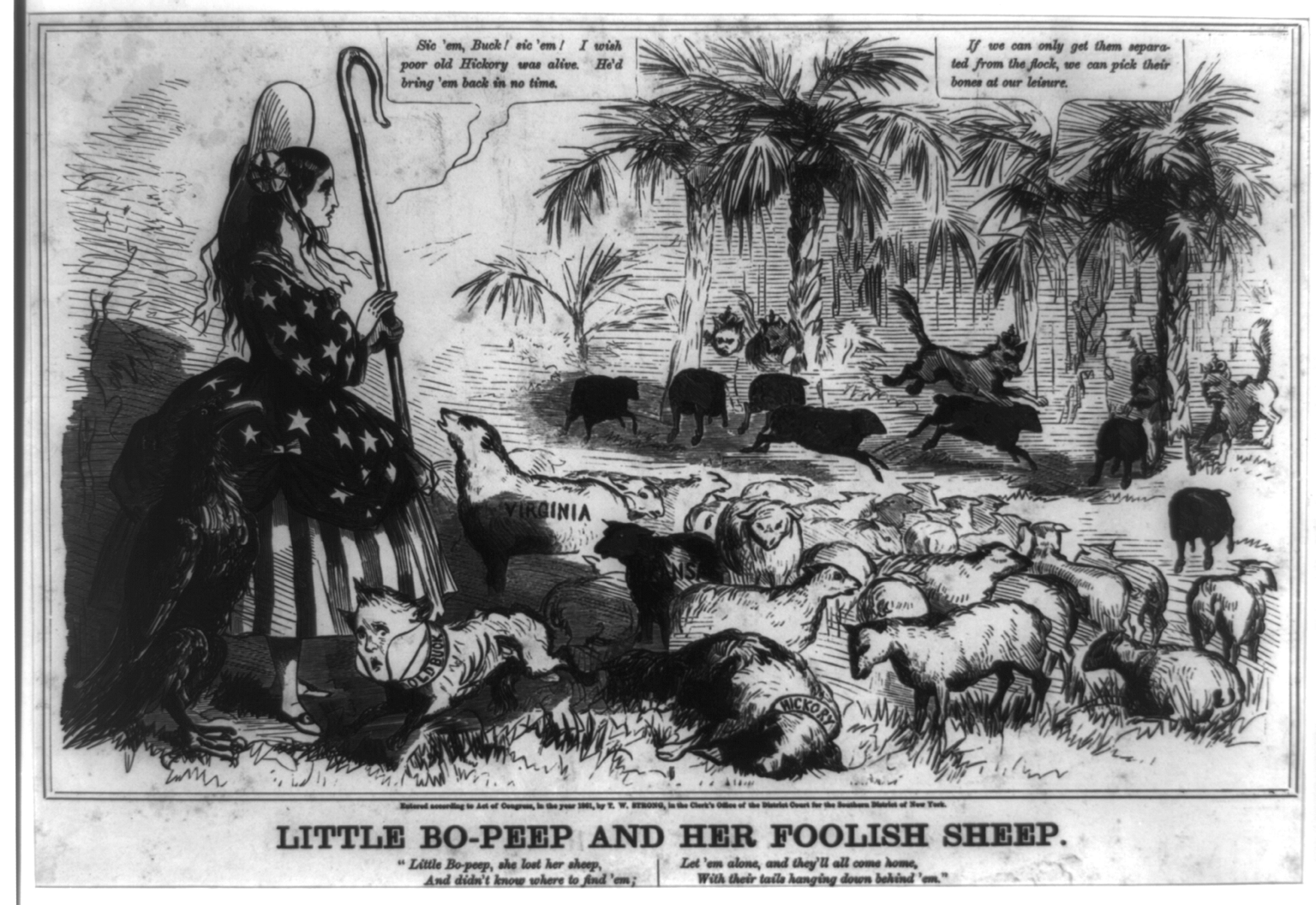
Columbia as Little Bo Peep; her lost sheep are the Southern states. Buchanan as "old buck" tries in vain to herd states back into the Union.

With Lincoln's victory, talk of secession and disunion reached a boiling point. A Cincinnati newspaper wrote, "the doctrine of secession is anarchy. If any minority have the right to break up the government at pleasure, because they have not had their way, there is an end of all government." In his annual message, delivered on December 3, 1860, Buchanan blamed the crisis entirely on Northerners and their anti-slavery agitation. He also argued that the Constitution made no provision for secession and that such an act would be unconstitutional. He stated that a "revolution" is justifiable in some instances, but argued that the South should wait for an "overt or dangerous" act before resorting to such a drastic action. Despite his opposition to secession, Buchanan argued that the president had no power to coerce states to remain in the Union, though he did state the president could defend federal property in seceding states. Finally, Buchanan asked Congress to call a convention of states to propose a constitutional amendment that would recognize slaves as property throughout the United States. His address was sharply criticized both by the North, for its refusal to stop secession, and the South, for denying its right to secede.

Historian Jean H. Baker explains Buchanan's behavior in terms of his Southern leanings, his long‐standing friendship with Southerners, and his choice of strong Southern personalities for his cabinet. She suggests that if it had not been for Joseph Holt, Edwin Stanton, and Jeremiah Black, Buchanan might have recognized the Confederate States of America.

During the lame duck session of the 36th Congress, the Senate established the Committee of Thirteen in an attempt to defuse the crisis. The committee consisted of a mix of Northern Democrats, Southern Democrats, and Republicans. Senator John J. Crittenden of Kentucky proposed a package of constitutional amendments known as the Crittenden Compromise. The compromise would protect slavery in federal territories, current and future, south of the 36°30′ parallel. Congress would be forbidden from abolishing slavery in any state or interfering with the domestic slave trade. President-elect Lincoln refused to acquiesce to any extension of slavery into the territories, as he feared that the compromise would encourage Southern leaders to attempt to annex new territory South of the 36°30′ parallel in order to extend slavery. He also believed that adoption of the Crittenden Compromise would set a precedent through which Southern leaders could use the threat of secession to extract concessions. On Lincoln's direction, a majority of the Republicans on the committee opposed the Crittenden Compromise, and it was defeated by a combination of Republican and Southern votes. Crittenden nonetheless brought his package to the Senate floor, where was defeated in a 25-to-23 vote on January 16, 1861.

1861 United States Secession Crisis map. Legend: States that seceded before April 15, 1861 States that seceded after April 15, 1861 States that permitted slavery, but did not secede States of the Union where slavery was banned U.S. territories, under Union Army control

In 1850, Southern extremists had called the Nashville Convention in an attempt to organize the simultaneous secession of Southern states. In 1860, pro-secession leaders pursued a state-by-state strategy, hoping to trigger a chain reaction by leading states to secede one-by-one. A minority of leaders in the Deep South, including Alexander Stephens, opposed secession before Lincoln made a move that would threaten slavery in the Southern states. However, the wide popularity of secession in the Deep South precluded delay until after Lincoln took office. As Congress scrambled to devise a compromise acceptable to North and South, the first Southern state seceded. South Carolina, long the most radical Southern state, declared its secession on December 20, 1860. The state ordnance of secession accused the North of having "assumed the right to decide upon the propriety of our domestic institutions" and also declared that the Republican Party believed that "a war must be waged against Slavery until it shall cease throughout the United States." After declaring its own secession, South Carolina sent commissioners to the other Southern states. By February 1, 1861, another six states had seceded. Conventions in Mississippi, Louisiana, and Florida overwhelmingly voted to secede, while unionists in Alabama and Georgia put up a stronger, but still unsuccessful, fight. In a referendum, two-thirds of Texans also voted to secede, despite the opposition of long-time Texas leader Sam Houston. The other eight slave states rejected secession, though North Carolina, Virginia, Tennessee, and Arkansas would later secede during Lincoln's presidency. The seceded states organized into the Confederate States of America, and Jefferson Davis was elected as the Confederacy's first president on February 9.

After trying in vain to convince Lincoln to publicly support a constitutional convention or a national referendum on the Crittenden Compromise, Buchanan sent a special message to Congress, asking it to authorize a referendum or find some other method of compromise that would allay the fears of the South. Leaders in both the North and South competed for the allegiance of the upper South, and both attempted to project an image of moderation. The House of Representatives established the Committee of Thirty-Three to help foster a compromise to prevent more states from seceding. Charles Francis Adams Sr. put forth a proposal to admit New Mexico as a slave state, but the lack of slaves in that territory led most congressmen to believe that it would become a de facto free state. With the support of Seward and Lincoln, the Committee of Thirty-Three put forth a resolution to repeal all state personal liberty laws, which were designed to make enforcement of the Fugitive Slave Act more difficult. The committee also proposed the Corwin Amendment, which would bar Congress from interfering with slavery in the states. A significant number of Republicans refused to support the Corwin Amendment, but it passed both of the houses of Congress and was proposed to the states for ratification. On February 4, delegates convened from most states outside of the Deep South convened in Washington for the Peace Conference of 1861, which was chaired by former President John Tyler. The convention proposed a solution similar to the Crittenden Compromise, with the major change being that slavery would be protected only in current territories below the 36°30′ parallel. Republican opposition to the Peace Conference's proposal killed its chances, and its proposals were rejected by Congress. The Corwin Amendment would never be ratified by the requisite number of states, but as Congress did not set a time limit for its ratification, the amendment is still technically pending.

=== Fort Sumter ===
With all compromise efforts failing, and with several Southern states having seceded, Buchanan's final days in office would be dominated by the issue of federal forts in the South, especially Fort Sumter. All sides recognized that the status of Fort Sumter and two other forts located near Charleston could decide whether or not the South would secede peacefully. As long as they remained under federal control, they would be a symbol of federal power, but a Southern attack on a federal fort could spark a civil war. Because whichever side that fired the first shot would look like the aggressor and pay a price in the crucial border states, many Southerners hoped to persuade Buchanan to peacefully surrender the forts.

Shortly after Lincoln's election, Buchanan and Secretary of War Floyd had appointed Major Robert Anderson to command Fort Sumter and the other two nearby federal installations. Buchanan ordered Anderson to hold the forts while avoiding any act that would provoke aggression. On December 27, Anderson evacuated from the more vulnerable Fort Moultrie. Meeting with several Southern leaders, Buchanan acknowledged that Anderson's actions had gone against his orders, but he refused to remove Anderson or surrender the forts. Outraged, Secretary of War Floyd, who himself was from Virginia, resigned. Buchanan considered ordering Anderson to return to Fort Moultrie, but his Northern cabinet members, who now made up a majority of the cabinet, threatened to resign. Buchanan instead composed a public message in which he stated that he would do all within his power to defend Fort Sumter, thereby rallying Northern support. Key anti-Confederate leaders included the new Attorney General Edwin Stanton and the new Secretary of War Joseph Holt.

On January 5, 1861, Buchanan decided to reinforce Fort Sumter, sending the Star of the West with 250 men and supplies. However, Buchanan failed to ask Major Anderson to provide covering fire for the ship, and it was forced to return North without delivering troops or supplies. Following the expedition, the last of Buchanan's Southern cabinet members resigned. The Buchanan administration debated ways to reinforce Fort Sumter, but Anderson did not ask for supplies and Buchanan was content to deliver the issue of Fort Sumter to President Lincoln. In February, South Carolina became part of the Confederate States of America. The Confederate Congress authorized President Davis to take the fort by any means necessary, but the Confederates would not strike until after the end of Buchanan's presidency. On March 3, a message from Anderson reached Buchanan stating that Fort Sumter's supplies were running low. The following day, Buchanan was succeeded by Lincoln, who was left to deal with the crisis that soon became the American Civil War.

== States admitted to the Union ==
Three new states were admitted to the Union while Buchanan was in office:

- Minnesota – May 11, 1858
- Oregon – February 14, 1859
- Kansas – January 29, 1861

== Historical reputation ==
BEP engraved portrait of Buchanan as President.

The day before his death, Buchanan predicted that "history will vindicate my memory". Historians have defied that prediction and criticize Buchanan for his passivity as the debate over slavery tore at and disrupted the country in the late 1850s. In terms of his legacy to American history, historian Michael Todd Landis links Buchanan closely to his top advisor Jehu Glancy Jones:

Leading Northern Democrats such as Jones and Buchanan were not romantic defenders of working men, as some scholars have claimed; nor were they moderates striving to save the Union from extreme sectionalism. Rather, they were proslavery activists whose willful actions had direct and disastrous effects on the nation. Their policies enraged free-state voters and caused the fatal split in the Democratic Party that resulted in Lincoln's election, which, in turn, triggered disunion. They were culpable and responsible—a fact that should not be forgotten or overlooked.

When asked to rank the best and worst presidents, Buchanan is consistently placed among the worst. Many consider him as the worst president in American history, for during his administration, the Union broke apart, and when he left office, civil war threatened.

A 2017 C-SPAN survey ranked him the least effective U.S. president of all time. The survey asked 91 presidential historians to rank the 43 former presidents (including then-outgoing president Barack Obama) in various categories to come up with a composite score, resulting in an overall ranking; Buchanan was ranked 43rd. His rankings in the various categories of this most recent poll were: public persuasion (43), crisis leadership (43), economic management (43), moral authority (43), international relations (43), administrative skills (41), relations with congress (42), vision/setting an agenda (43), pursued equal justice for all (43), performance with context of times (43). A 2018 poll of the American Political Science Association's Presidents and Executive Politics section ranked Buchanan as the second-worst president. A 2006 poll of historians ranked Buchanan's failure to prevent the Civil War as the worst mistake ever made by a sitting president.

Buchanan biographer Philip Klein explains the challenges Buchanan faced:

Buchanan assumed leadership ... when an unprecedented wave of angry passion was sweeping over the nation. That he held the hostile sections in check during these revolutionary times was in itself a remarkable achievement. His weaknesses in the stormy years of his presidency were magnified by enraged partisans of the North and South. His many talents, which in a quieter era might have gained for him a place among the great presidents, were quickly overshadowed by the cataclysmic events of civil war and by the towering Abraham Lincoln."

Biographer Jean Baker is less charitable to Buchanan:

Americans have conveniently misled themselves about the presidency of James Buchanan, preferring to classify him as indecisive and inactive ... In fact Buchanan's failing during the crisis over the Union was not inactivity, but rather his partiality for the South, a favoritism that bordered on disloyalty in an officer pledged to defend all the United States. He was that most dangerous of chief executives, a stubborn, mistaken ideologue whose principles held no room for compromise. His experience in government had only rendered him too self-confident to consider other views. In his betrayal of the national trust, Buchanan came closer to committing treason than any other president in American history.

Quite apart from the moralistic evaluations of Buchanan's failures, historians have recently been asking new questions about exactly how his administration worked. Michael L. Carrafiello argues:

In the 1990s, however, a group of eminent antebellum historians declared that much more work needed to be done on Buchanan and his presidency. History's verdict on Buchanan, they said, cannot merely be that he was the antithesis of Lincoln. They suggested a number of questions on Buchanan that remained to be answered including "How did he define his presidential role?" and "What was his concept, his view, of the power of the presidency?" In addition, there are other recurring questions concerning the Buchanan presidency such as "Why did Buchanan assemble such a weak cabinet?"; "What were his real views of the institution of slavery?"; "And how could he have believed that the Supreme Court through the Dred Scott decision would provide a definitive settlement to the slavery issue?"
