= Jon Lee =

Jon Lee is the name of:

- Jon Lee (drummer) (1968–2002), former drummer of Welsh rock band Feeder
- Jon Lee (actor) (born 1982), singer and actor, member of S Club 7
- Jon Lee (mathematician) (born 1960), professor at the University of Michigan
- Jon Lee (volleyball player) (born 1949), American volleyball player

== See also ==
- John Lee (disambiguation)
- Jonathan Lee (disambiguation)
