= John Leigh =

John Leigh may refer to:

== Politicians ==
- John Leigh (MP for Hythe) (fl.1421–1432), English member of parliament (MP) for Hythe
- Sir John Leigh (died 1612), English MP for Grampound, Launceston and Helston
- Sir John Leigh (Yarmouth MP) (c. 1598–c. 1666), MP for Yarmouth 1640–1648, 1660–1661
- John Leigh (died 1620) (1562–1620), English MP for Bedford, 1614
- John Leigh (died 1689) (c. 1651–1689), English MP for Newport, 1675–1689
- John Leigh (died 1743) (c. 1670–1743), English MP for Newtown, 1702–1705
- John Leigh (Wisconsin politician) (1827–1893), American politician
- Sir John Leigh, 1st Baronet (1884–1959), British mill-owner, newspaper proprietor and Conservative Party politician

== Others ==
- John Leigh (18th-century actor) (1689–1726), Irish actor and dramatist
- Jack Leigh (1948–2004), American photographer and author
- John Leigh (ambassador), ambassador for Sierra Leone to the United States
- John Leigh (New Zealand actor) (born 1965), New Zealand actor, appeared as Háma in The Lord of the Rings: The Two Towers
- John Leigh (doctor) (1812–1888), English doctor and public health administrator

== See also ==
- John Legh (disambiguation)
- John Lee (disambiguation)
- John Lea (disambiguation)
