= Johnny Lee =

Johnny Lee may refer to:

- Johnny Lee (actor) (1898–1965), American singer, dancer, voice actor and actor
- Johnny Lee (computer scientist), American computer scientist
- Johnny Lee (singer), (born 1946), American country singer
- Johnny Lee (rugby union) (born 2004), New Zealand rugby player

== See also ==
- John Lee (disambiguation)
