= John Legh =

John Legh may refer to:

- John Legh (18th century MP) for Bodmin
- John Legh (14th century MP) for Surrey

== See also ==
- John Leigh (disambiguation)
