= John Fitzgerald Lee =

- Born: June 29, 1848; Washington, D.C., U.S.
- Died: November 28, 1926 (aged 78); St. Louis, Missouri, U.S.
- Education: Georgetown University; University of Virginia

John Fitzgerald Lee (June 29, 1848–November 28, 1926) served as president of the St. Louis Bar Association, president of the David Rankin School of Mechanical Trades, and a board member of the St. Louis Public Library. Lee Hall in Washington University in St. Louis is named after him.

== Early life and education ==
Lee was born in Washington D.C. in 1848. His father, also John Fitzgerald Lee, was a former Judge Advocate General of the United States Army and the first Judge Advocate General since the position had been vacant since 1802.

Lee attended Georgetown University and the University of Virginia. Starting in 1870, he practiced law in St. Louis at the law firm of A. and J.F. Lee

From 1902 to 1926, he was a member of the Washington University Board of Directors. After his death, his estate was divided equally between Washington University and Saint Louis University; each university received $500,000.

Lee Hall was paid for by the rental money received from the Louisiana Purchase Exposition.
