= Jonathan Lee =

Jonathan may refer to:

- Jon Lee (drummer) (1968–2002), former drummer of Welsh rock band Feeder
- Jon Lee (actor) (born 1982), singer and actor, former S Club 7 member
- Jonathan Lee (novelist) (born 1981), British writer and novelist
- Jonathan Lee (musician) (born 1958), record producer and singer-songwriter from Taiwan
- M Jonathan Lee (born 1974), British novelist

== See also ==
- Jonathon Lee (1953–2004), pianist
