= Horatio King =

American politician

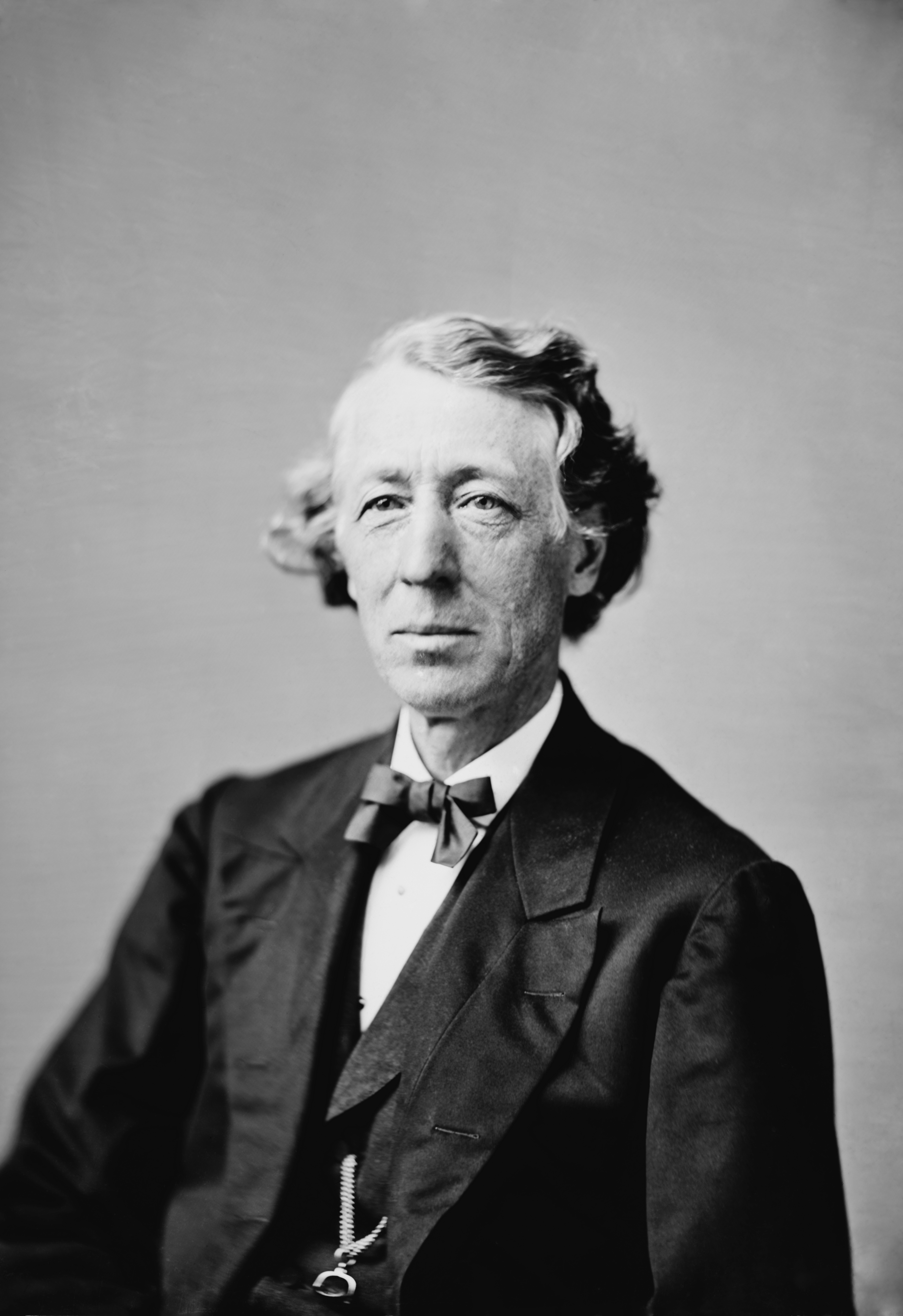

19th United States Postmaster General
- In office February 12, 1861 – March 5, 1861
- President: James Buchanan; Abraham Lincoln
- Preceded by: Joseph Holt
- Succeeded by: Montgomery Blair

Personal details
- Born: June 21, 1811 Paris, Maine, U.S.
- Died: May 20, 1897 (aged 85) Washington, D.C., U.S.
- Party: Democratic
- Children: Horatio Collins King (Son)
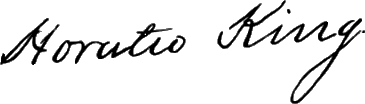
- Signature

Horatio King (June 21, 1811 – May 20, 1897) was Postmaster General of the United States under James Buchanan. King served as the Postmaster General for only 21 days in 1861 (February 12 to March 4), the shortest tenure in the office's history.

== Early life ==
Born in Paris, Maine, he received a common school education, and at the age of 18 entered the office of the Paris Jeffersonian, where he learned printing, afterward becoming owner and editor of the paper. In 1833 he moved it to Portland, where he published it until 1838.

== Postal career ==
In 1839 he went to Washington, D.C., having been appointed clerk in the post office department, and was gradually promoted. In 1854 he was appointed first Assistant Postmaster General during the presidency of Franklin Pierce, and in January, 1861, while acting as Postmaster General, he was questioned by a member of Congress from South Carolina with regard to the franking privilege. In his reply, King was the first to officially deny the power of a state to separate from the Union. He was then appointed Postmaster General, serving from February 12 until March 5, 1861.

== Later life ==
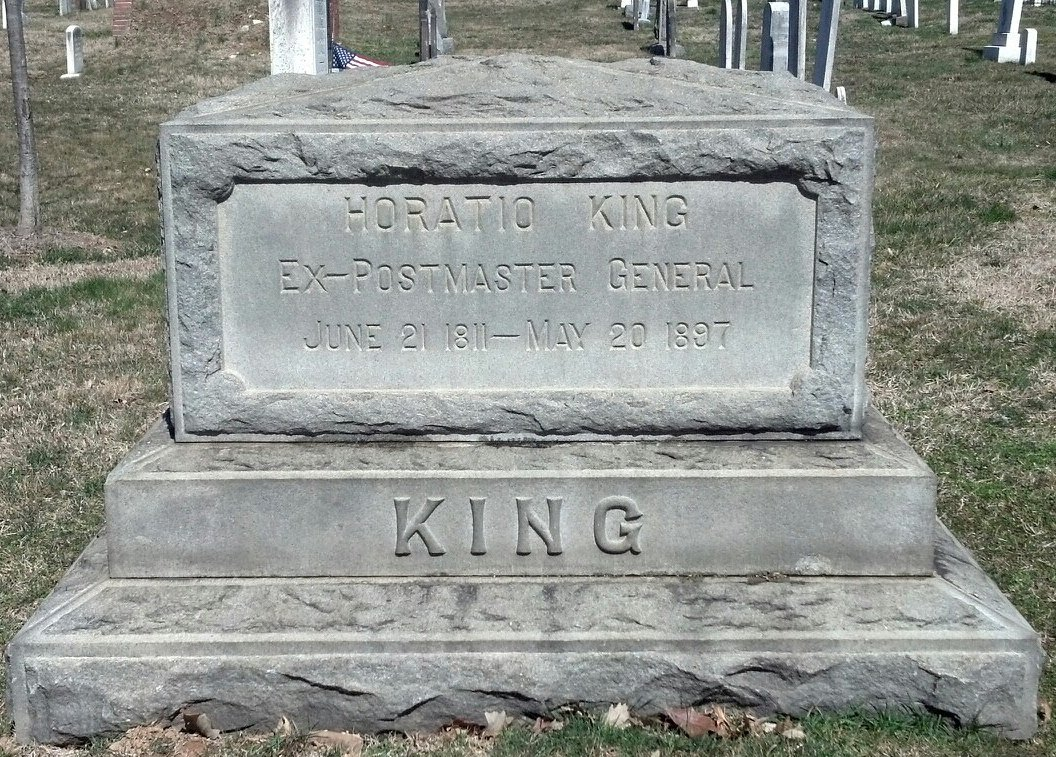
Tomb of Horatio King

On retiring from office, he remained in Washington, D.C., during the Civil War, serving on a board of commissioners to carry into execution the emancipation law in the District of Columbia. His efforts led to a considerable number of former slaves settling in the District.

After his retirement from office, King practiced in Washington as an attorney before the executive department and international commissions. He was active in procuring the passage of three acts in 1874, 1879, and 1885 respectively, requiring the use of the official "penalty envelope," which has secured a large saving to the government. He also took an active part in the work of completing the Washington Monument, serving as secretary of the Monument Society from 1881. King was a frequent contributor to the press, and published An Oration before the Union Literary Society of Washington (Washington, D.C., 1841), and Sketches of Travel; or, Twelve Months in Europe (1878).

He was married twice. In 1846 he married Anne Collins in Maine. They had three children: Anne, Horatio Collins and Henry Franklin. After her death, he married Isabella E. Osborn in Washington in 1875. In 1881, he purchased land in West Newton, MA and built a house there on the corner of Temple and Sterling Streets which he and his wife Isabelle used as a summer residence, near the home of their son, Henry Franklin King.

King was the last surviving member of the Buchanan cabinet.

== Notes ==
Political offices
| Preceded by Joseph Holt | United States Postmaster General; Served under: James Buchanan; 1861 | Succeeded by Montgomery Blair |
