= Jack Lee (Australian footballer) =

Australian rules footballer

Personal information
- Full name: John Herbert Lee
- Born: 9 November 1878; Geelong, Victoria
- Died: 10 September 1947 (aged 68); Ballarat, Victoria

Playing career^{1}
Years	Club	Games (Goals)
1903	Geelong	3 (0)
- ^{1} Playing statistics correct to the end of 1903.

John Herbert Lee (9 November 1878 – 10 September 1947) was an Australian rules footballer who played with Geelong in the Victorian Football League (VFL).
