= Joseph Holt =

American politician (1807–1894)

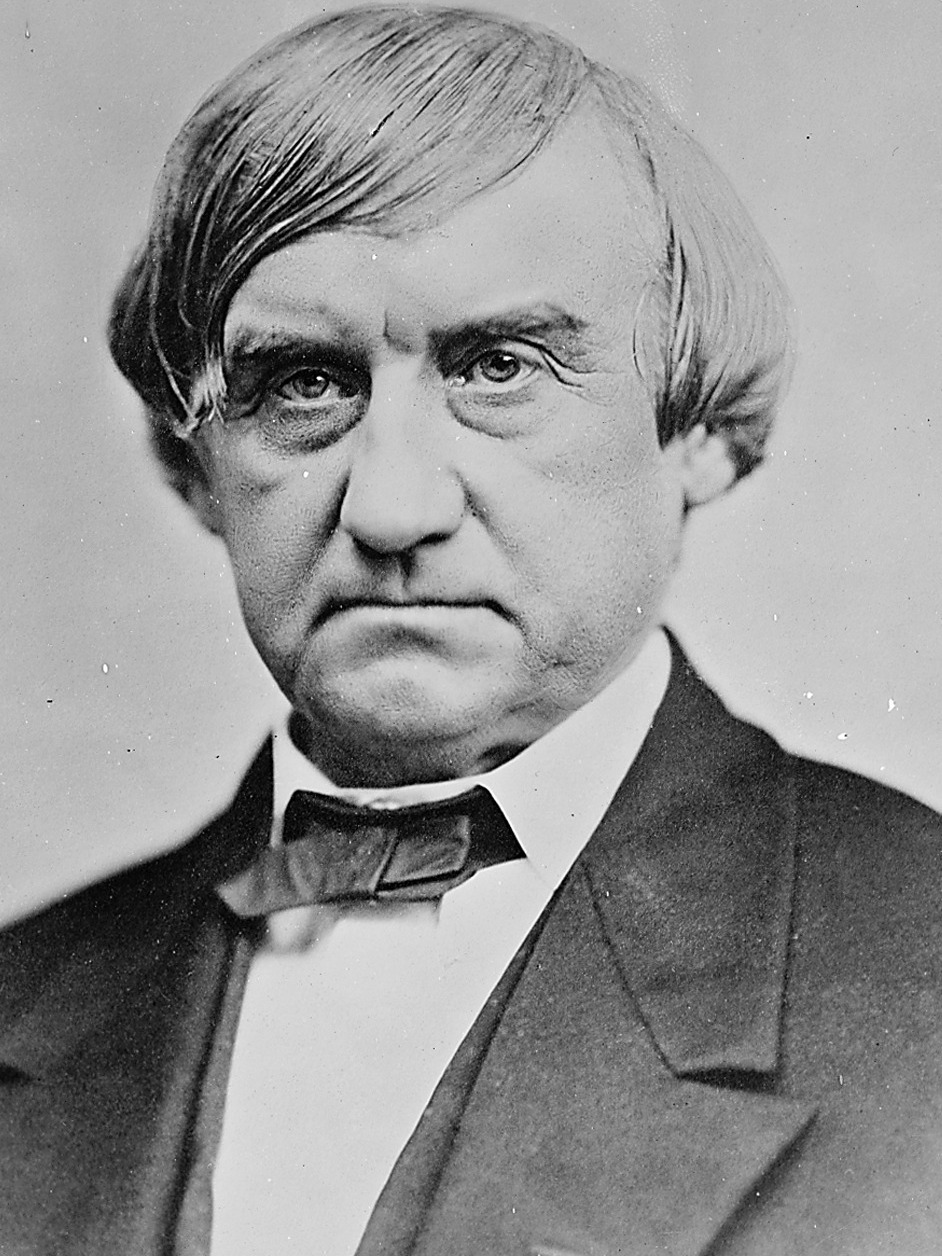
- Holt c. 1860–1865

Judge Advocate General of the United States Army
- In office September 3, 1862 – December 1, 1875
- President: Abraham Lincoln; Andrew Johnson; Ulysses S. Grant
- Preceded by: John F. Lee
- Succeeded by: William McKee Dunn

25th United States Secretary of War
- In office January 18, 1861 – March 5, 1861
- President: James Buchanan
- Preceded by: John B. Floyd
- Succeeded by: Simon Cameron

18th United States Postmaster General
- In office March 9, 1859 – December 31, 1860
- President: James Buchanan
- Preceded by: Aaron V. Brown
- Succeeded by: Horatio King

Personal details
- Born: January 6, 1807 Breckinridge County, Kentucky, U.S.
- Died: August 1, 1894 (aged 87) Washington, D.C., U.S.
- Party: Democratic (before 1861); Republican (after 1861)
- Spouse(s): Mary Harrison; Margaret Wickliffe
- Education: Centre College

Military service
- Allegiance: United States
- Branch/service: United States Army (Union Army)
- Years of service: 1862-1875
- Rank: Brigadier general
- Commands: Judge Advocate General's Corps
- Battles/wars: American Civil War

Joseph Holt (January 6, 1807 – August 1, 1894) was an American lawyer, soldier, and politician. As a leading member of the Buchanan administration, he succeeded in convincing Buchanan to oppose the secession of the South. He returned to Kentucky and successfully battled the secessionist element thereby helping to keep Kentucky in the Union. President Abraham Lincoln appointed him the Judge Advocate General of the United States Army. He served as Lincoln's chief arbiter and enforcer of military law, and supporter of emancipation. His most famous roles came in the Lincoln assassination trials.

== Early life ==
Joseph Holt was born in Breckinridge County, Kentucky, on January 6, 1807. He was educated at St. Joseph's College in Bardstown, Kentucky and Centre College in Danville, Kentucky. He settled in Elizabethtown, Kentucky, and set up a law office in town. He married Mary Harrison and moved to Louisville, Kentucky, in 1832. There, he became assistant editor of the Louisville Public Advertiser and the Commonwealth's Attorney from 1833 to 1835. Holt moved to Port Gibson, Mississippi, and practiced law there as well as in Natchez, Mississippi and Vicksburg, Mississippi. Holt and his wife contracted tuberculosis. Mary died of it, and Joseph returned to Louisville to recuperate.

== Buchanan administration ==
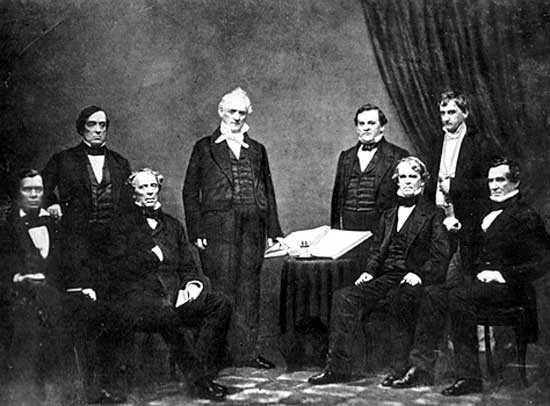
President Buchanan and his Cabinet, c. 1859 (left to right: Jacob Thompson, Lewis Cass, John B. Floyd, James Buchanan, Howell Cobb, Isaac Toucey, Joseph Holt and Jeremiah S. Black)

Following Mary's death, Holt remarried, to Margaret Wickliffe. In 1857, Holt was appointed Commissioner of Patents by President Buchanan and moved to Washington D.C. He served until 1859 when Buchanan appointed him Postmaster General. The Buchanan administration was shaken in December 1860 and January 1861, when the Confederacy was formed and many cabinet members resigned, but Holt was both against slavery and strongly for the Union. Supported by his close ally Attorney General Edwin M. Stanton, he was appointed Secretary of War upon the resignation of John B. Floyd of Virginia, who joined the Confederacy. Stanton and Holt convinced President Buchanan he had to speak out against secession as an illegal act. Buchanan did so, but he also thought he had no power whatsoever to stop the secession. When Lincoln took office, Holt returned to Kentucky and worked successfully to keep the state out of the Confederacy. Kentucky was virtually neutral until Confederate units invaded in September 1861, and the Unionist element took control.

== Judge Advocate General ==
Holt joined the Army as a colonel in 1862 and was appointed by President Abraham Lincoln to be the Judge Advocate General of the Union Army. As Judge Advocate General of the Army, Holt oversaw the expansion of military law to include the military prosecutions of citizens who were not in the military service. He crafted the argument to the Supreme Court in Ex Parte Vallandigham, By the time he joined the Army, he believed that the only means to prevent treason from occurring again was to ensure that slavery was abolished for all time, and eventually equal treatment under the law enforced in the South.

In 1864, he was promoted to brigadier general. He was the first Judge Advocate General to hold a general's rank. He personally prosecuted the court-martial against Major General Fitz John Porter for crimes of disobedience of a lawful order and misbehavior in front of the enemy. Lincoln also offered Holt the position of Secretary of the Interior that same year and Attorney General later in 1864, but Holt declined both offices.

He was one of the many politicians considered for the Republican vice presidential nomination in 1864. It went to Andrew Johnson, and Lincoln was re-elected.

According to University of New Mexico, School of Law Professor Joshua E. Kastenberg, Holt engaged in political activities that were important for the Union's war efforts, but would not be constitutionally permissible today. For instance, Holt crafted legislation that stripped Union Army deserters of their citizenship. The Supreme Court overturned this legislation in Tropp v. Dulles in 1958. Holt's reasoning for this law was that Copperheads and other pro-slavery southern sympathizers encouraged desertions. Holt also used the Army's power to suppress newspapers as well as oversee the arrest and trial of Congressman Benjamin Gwinn Harris of Maryland who "uttered treasonous statements" in the House of Representatives.

=== Abraham Lincoln assassination ===
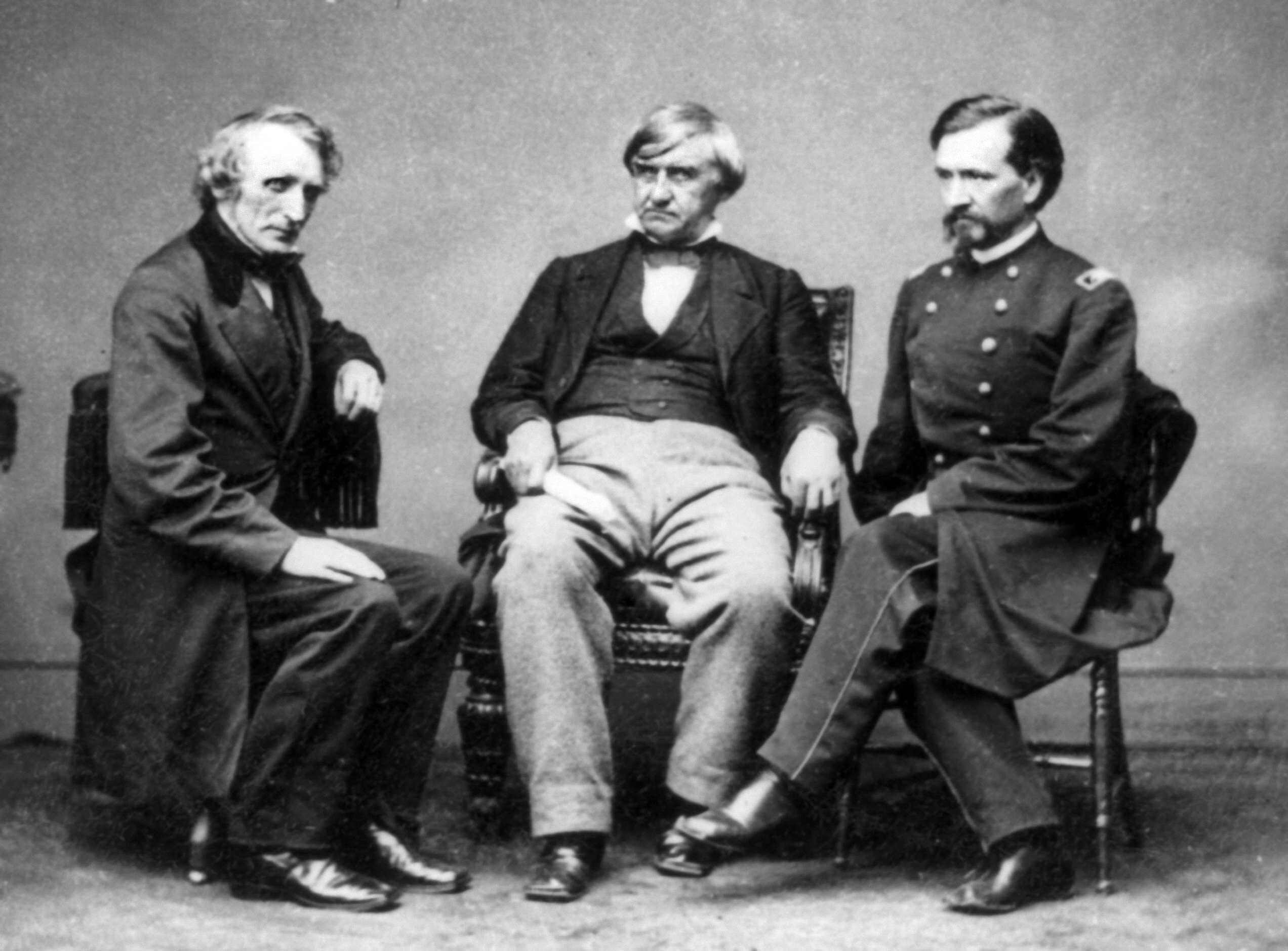
Joseph Holt (center) along with John Bingham (left) and Henry Burnett (right) were the three prosecutors in charge of the Lincoln assassination trial.

On April 14, 1865, Lincoln was assassinated by Confederate sympathizer John Wilkes Booth. Booth's accomplice, Lewis Powell seriously injured Secretary of State Seward, and Vice President Johnson was also targeted. Holt prepared an order for the signature of Johnson for the arrest of Confederate President Jefferson Davis and five other suspects. Booth was caught on April 26, 1865, but killed by Boston Corbett, a soldier who violated orders.

As Judge Advocate General of the Army, Holt was the chief prosecutor in the trial of the accused conspirators before a military commission chaired by General David Hunter. Two assistant judge advocates, John Bingham and General Henry Lawrence Burnett assisted Holt. The defendants were George Atzerodt, David Herold, Lewis Powell, Samuel Arnold, Michael O'Laughlen, Edman Spangler, Samuel Mudd, and Mary Surratt. The trial began on May 10, 1865, and lasted two months. Holt and Bingham attempted to obscure the fact that there were two plots. The first plot was to kidnap Lincoln and exchange him for Confederate prisoners held by the Union. The second was to assassinate Lincoln, Johnson, and Seward and so throw the government into chaos.

On June 29, 1865, the eight were found guilty of conspiracy to kill the President. Arnold, O'Laughlen, and Mudd were sentenced to life in prison, Spangler to six years in prison, and Atzerodt, Herold, Powell, and Surratt to be death. They were executed on July 7, 1865, making Surratt the first woman to be executed by the U.S. federal government.

Holt's public image was damaged by the trial and his prosecution of it, and many historians believe that the controversy surrounding it ended Holt's political career. In 1866, Holt issued a pamphlet, titled Vindication of Judge Advocate General Holt From the Foul Slanders of Traitors, Confessed Perjurers and Suborners, Acting in the Interest of Jefferson Davis, in which he attempted to defend himself against the various allegations and clear up some of the confusion stemming from the trial.

== Later life ==
Holt served as Judge Advocate General until he retired on December 1, 1875. He had a quiet retirement and died in Washington on August 1, 1894. His personal library was put up for auction by C.G. Sloan & Co. in Washington, D.C. in December 1894. He is buried in the Holt Family Cemetery in Addison, Kentucky. Holt County, Nebraska, is named after him, as is the hamlet of Holtsville, New York and the town of Holt, Michigan.

== See also ==
- Camp Joe Holt
- List of American Civil War generals (Union)

Political offices
Preceded by Aaron V. Brown	United States Postmaster General; Served under: James Buchanan; March 9, 1859 – December 31, 1860	Succeeded by Horatio King
Preceded by John B. Floyd	U.S. Secretary of War; Served under: James Buchanan; January 18, 1861 – March 5, 1861	Succeeded by Simon Cameron
Military offices
Preceded by John F. Lee	Judge Advocate General of the United States Army; September 3, 1862 – December 1, 1875	Succeeded by William M. Dunn
