= Jonathon Lee =

- Born: September 3, 1953
- Died: October 3, 2004 (aged 51)
- Occupation: Pianist
- Instrument: Piano
- Years active: c. 1988 – 2004

Jonathon Lee (September 3, 1953 – October 3, 2004) was an American pianist known for playing in California at such locations as Big Sur, Carmel, the Highlands Inn at Carmel Highlands, and the Big Sur International Marathon.

His music has been called "a fresh blend of original compositions, contemporary, classical, popular, and...universal in its appeal." It has been sold at the Pebble Beach golf resort (Pebble Beach Golf Links) and marketed in Asia.

Lee was the "Grand Piano Man" of the Big Sur International Marathon for 17 years.
