= John F. Lee =

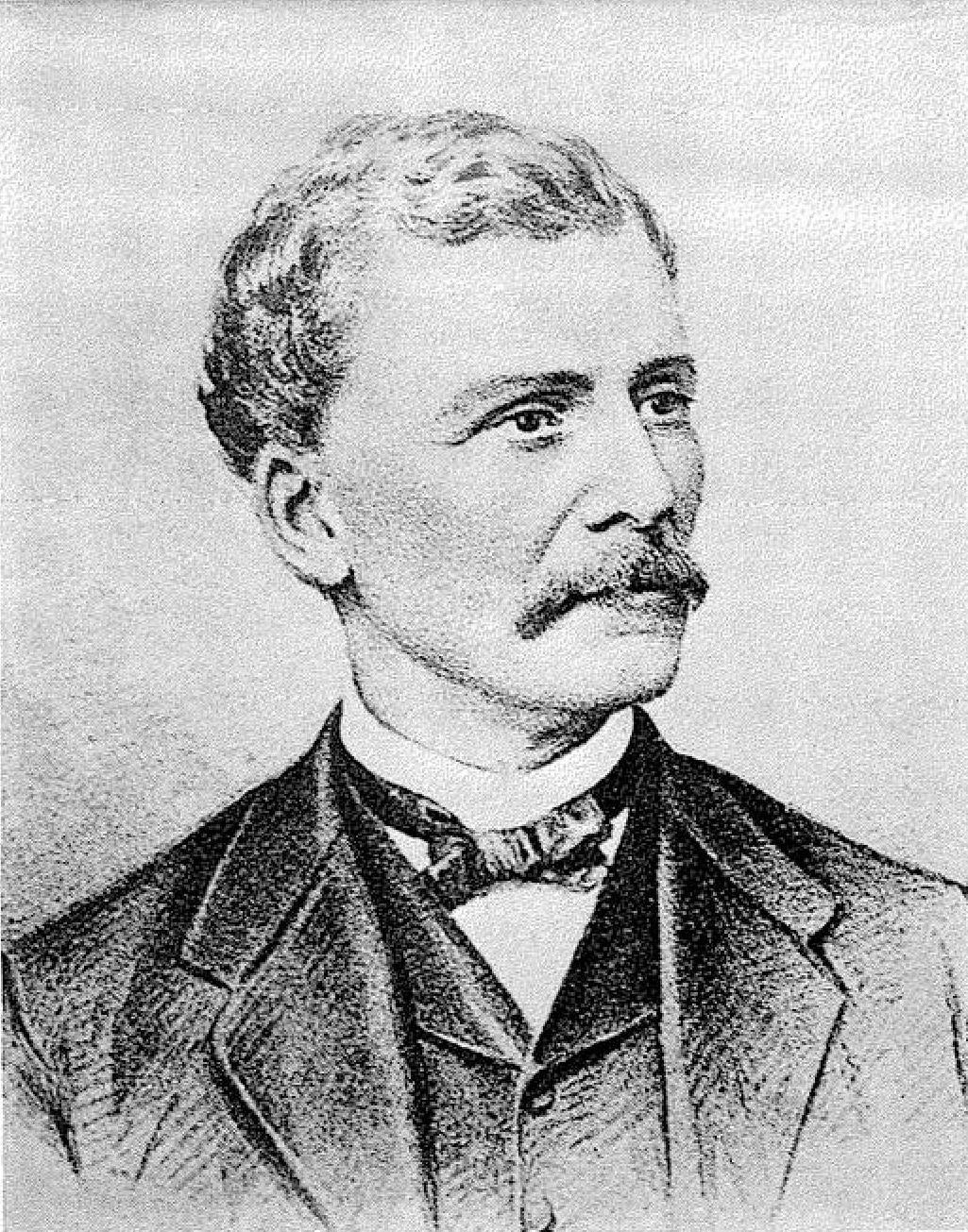

Judge Advocate General of the United States Army
- In office March 2, 1849 – September 3, 1862
- President: Zachary Taylor; Millard Fillmore; Franklin Pierce; James Buchanan; Abraham Lincoln
- Preceded by: None, (Captain Campbell Smith in 1802)
- Succeeded by: Joseph Holt

Personal details
- Born: May 5, 1813 Sully Plantation in Fairfax County, Virginia, US
- Died: June 17, 1884 (aged 71) St. Louis, Missouri, US
- Resting place: Calvary Cemetery; St. Louis, Missouri, US

Military service
- Allegiance: United States of America; Union
- Branch/service: United States Army (Union Army)
- Years of service: 1834-1862
- Rank: Captain; Brevet Major
- Commands: Judge Advocate General's Corps
- Battles/wars: Second Seminole War; American Civil War

John Fitzgerald Lee (May 5, 1813 – June 17, 1884) was the Judge Advocate General of the United States Army from 1849 until 1862 and the first Judge Advocate General since the position had been vacant since 1802. He was a member of the Virginia Lee family being a grandson of Richard Henry Lee and a cousin of Robert E. Lee, the Confederate general who became commander of the Confederate States Army during the American Civil War. He was also the brother of Samuel Phillips Lee, a rear admiral in the United States Navy, and the brother-in-law of Montgomery Blair, the postmaster general under Abraham Lincoln.

The office of Judge Advocate General had been formally discontinued on March 2, 1821, when the military establishment of the United States had been reduced. The office was brought back on March 2, 1849, for the president to appoint a suitable captain of the army.

His son, also named John Fitzgerald Lee (1848–1926), served as president of the St. Louis Bar Association, president of the David Rankin School of Mechanical Trades, and board member of the St. Louis Public Library. A dormitory on Washington University is named after this younger John F. Lee.

== See also ==
Lee Family Digital Archive
