= Jack E. Lee =

Jack E. Lee (May 29, 1936 - July 30, 2009) was a track, baseball, and wrestling public address announcer, from the 1960s through the 1990s.

Lee is primarily known for calling several major harness races at the now-defunct Roosevelt Raceway on Long Island (Westbury, NY) in the 1970s and 1980s, and is considered by many to be the "Golden Voice" of that era in harness racing. In addition to his stint as the track announcer at Roosevelt Raceway (1968–1985) and Freehold Raceway (1966, 1990–1998), Lee also called quarter horse races at Suffolk (Parr) Meadows on Long Island from 1986-1987. In addition to Roosevelt, Lee occasionally substituted for Bob Meyer at Yonkers Raceway.

Known for having a mellow voice and a descriptive style of announcing, Lee was considered by many to be the top racecaller in all of harness racing during the 1970s and 1980s. His calls were heard nationwide on the superstation WOR-TV, where he co-hosted the show "Racing from Roosevelt" with Stan Bergstein and Dave Johnson (and later on Spencer Ross).

Aside from his horse racing duties, Lee was also the first PA announcer for the New York Mets, from their inception in 1962 at the Polo Grounds, and later at Shea Stadium, through August 1966. In addition, for a time in the 1970s, he was the ring announcer for the World Wide Wrestling Federation at Madison Square Garden.

== Personal life ==
Jack E. Lee died on July 30, 2009. Lee was retired, living in Florida.

Lee's son Randy has worked as an announcer for horse races in Florida.
