= John P. Lee =

American football player and coach

Coaching career (HC unless noted)
- 1891: Fordham
- 1893: Fordham

Head coaching record
- Overall: 13–3–3

John P. Lee was an American college football player and coach. He was the head football coach at Fordham University in 1891 and 1893, compiling a record of 13–3–3.

== Head coaching record ==
| Year | Team | Overall | Conference | Standing | Bowl/playoffs |
|---|---|---|---|---|---|
Fordham (Independent) (1891)
| 1891 | Fordham | 8–2–3 | | | |
Fordham (Independent) (1893)
| 1893 | Fordham | 5–1 | | | |
| Fordham: | | 13–3–3 | | | |
| Total: | | 13–3–3 | | | |
