= Jon Lee (mathematician) =

American mathematician

Jon Lee (born 1960) is an American mathematician and operations researcher, the G. Lawton and Louise G. Johnson Professor of Engineering at the University of Michigan. He is known for his research in nonlinear discrete optimization and combinatorial optimization.

== Biography ==
Lee graduated from Stuyvesant High School in 1977. He did both his undergraduate and graduate studies at Cornell University, earning a bachelor's degree in 1981 and a Ph.D. in 1986 under the supervision of Robert G. Bland. Lee was a faculty member at Yale University from 1985 until 1993, when he moved to the mathematics department at the University of Kentucky. From 2000 to 2011, he worked at the IBM Thomas J. Watson Research Center, after which he returned to academia at the University of Michigan. From 2010 through 2012, Lee was chair of the INFORMS Optimization Society. In 2018–2021, Lee was Editor-in-Chief of the journal Mathematical Programming, Series A.

== Books ==
Lee is the author of A First Course in Combinatorial Optimization (Cambridge University Press, 2004) and A First Course in Linear Optimization (Reex Press, 2013). He is co-author, with Marcia Fampa, of Maximum-Entropy Sampling: Algorithms and Application (Springer, 2022). He is co-editor of: Trends in Optimization (American Mathematical Society, 2004), Mixed Integer Nonlinear Programming (Springer, 2012), Integer Programming and Combinatorial Optimization (Lecture Notes in Computer Science, Vol. 8494; Springer, 2014), Special Issue: Integer Programming and Combinatorial Optimization, 2014 (Mathematical Programming, Series B. Issue 1-2, December 2015), and Combinatorial Optimization (Lecture Notes in Computer Science, Vol. 10856; Springer, 2018).

== Awards and honors ==
In 2010, Lee and his co-authors won the ICS Prize of the INFORMS Computing Society for their work showing that many combinatorial feasibility problems could be recast as systems of polynomial equations in complex variables and then shown to be infeasible by applying Hilbert's Nullstellensatz and a wide variety of computational techniques.

In 2013, Lee was elected as a Fellow of INFORMS.
