= M Jonathan Lee =

British author (born 1974)

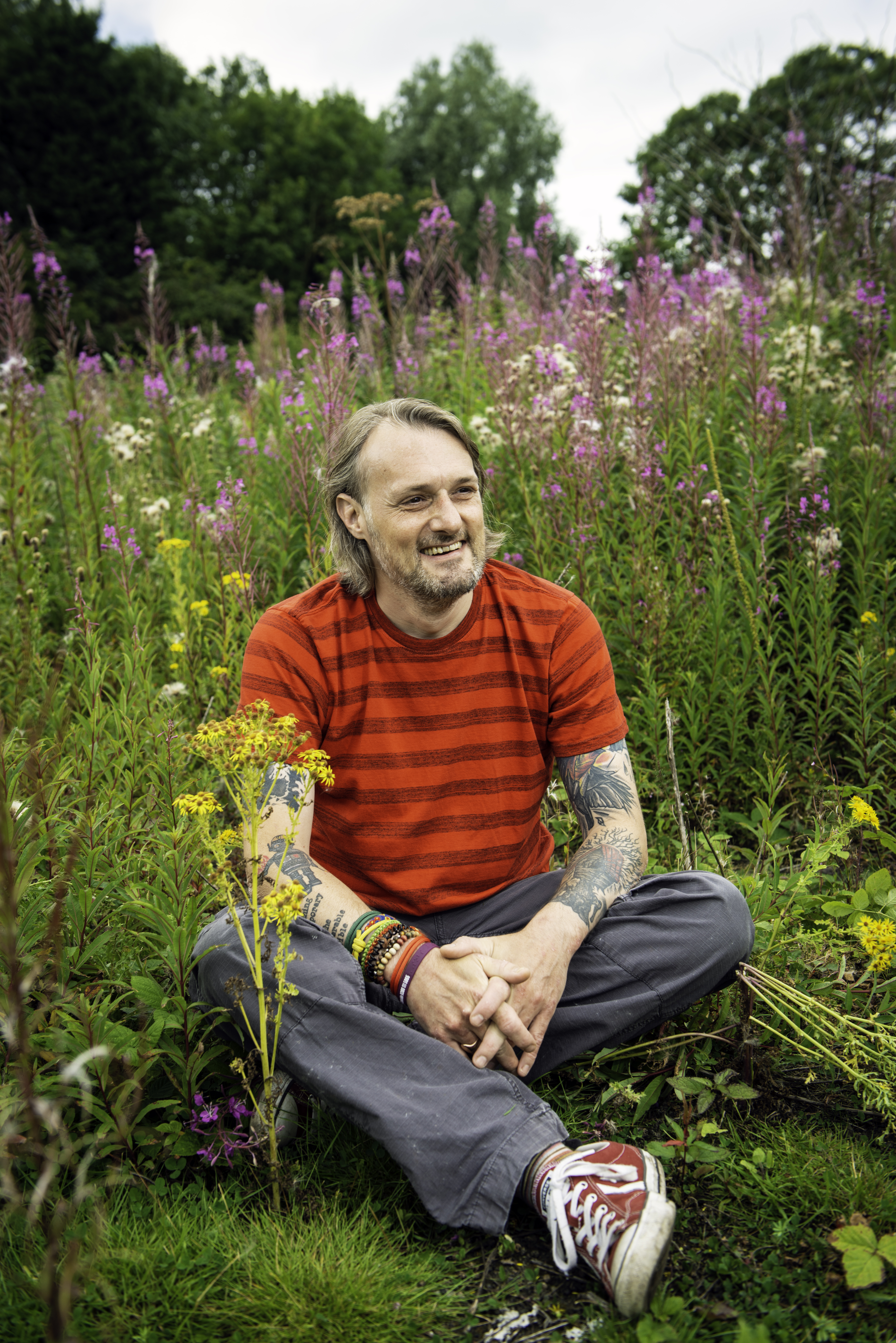
- Born: 5 April 1974 (age 52); Barnsley
- Occupations: Novelist, public speaker
- Children: 3
- Writing career
- Genre: Thriller
- Notable works: The Radio and 337
- Website: mjonathanlee.com

M Jonathan Lee (born 5 April 1974) is a British author. His debut novel, The Radio, was nationally shortlisted in The Novel Prize 2012, a prize for unpublished authors. He has since released four further novels, and written on mental health issues for the Huffington Post.

== Early life ==
Lee was born in Barnsley in 1974. He is the second of three children. He attended St Matthew’s primary school and Keir Street Junior school before continuing his education at the Kingstone school. Following two years at Barnsley College, he trained to be an accountant. He eventually studied business at the University of Central Lancashire.

== Career ==
Lee was a manager of the Tax and Trust Department at Leeds wealth management company Pearson Jones Plc when he published his first book. He began writing seriously at the age of 9 at which point he self-published a magazine which ran for six issues and sold more than 500 copies. Since then, he has written a number of short stories and journals of ideas before finally writing The Radio. The Radio was published by Troubador in April 2013 and was described as "very moving...and wonderfully well observed" by Yvette Huddleston of The Yorkshire Post. It is a black comedy which tackles the difficult subject of suicide. In an interview with Female First magazine in June 2013, Lee described the suicide of his older brother in 2005 and explained that "[it was]...very cathartic sharing this in The Radio." It is part of the 'The' trilogy and has since sold out its first print run. In March 2016, The Radio was voted "Book of the Month" for March 2016 by The Dadness.

In January 2015, Lee's second novel, The Page was published through Troubador and his third novel A Tiny Feeling of Fear was published by Solopreneur Publishing in September 2015. A Tiny Feeling of Fear tells the story of Andrew Walker, a successful businessman who appears to be a happy, well-adjusted man, with the respect and admiration of his colleagues – but behind closed doors, his private life is a mess. The novel is in some ways autobiographical and deals with mental health issues and ultimately is a story of hope.

In November 2015, Lee travelled to Boston, MA to begin work on a rock-biography about US alternative rock band, Hallelujah the Hills. In 2016, Lee featured in the Hallelujah the Hills video for the single, "We have the Perimeter Surrounded".

Lee has written on mental health issues for the Huffington Post. He has appeared on BBC Radio Sheffield's Live-ish comedy show and at Sheffield's Off the Shelf Festival and Doncaster's Turn The Page in 2013 and 2014.

In May 2017, Lee signed a deal with Hideaway Fall publishers. In the same month, the film "Hidden" was released filmed by Simon Gamble and based on the book A Tiny Feeling of Fear. It is filmed in a documentary format and charts Lee's life and discusses his own mental health issues.

In August 2017, The Big Issue described Lee's fourth novel Broken Branches as "an examination of grief and loss in a unique way". Broken Branches was voted book of the month for August 2017 in Candis Magazine.

In 2018, Lee's fifth novel, Drift Stumble Fall was released.

On 30 November 2020, Lee's sixth novel 337 was published by Hideaway Fall. 337 is the first of his books to be published as an audiobook with actor and poet Matt Weigold narrating."

== Personal life ==
Lee's novels often depict characters who have mental health problems, but beyond his fiction, he is a regular contributor and now writes monthly on mental health issues for the Huffington Post. In an interview on the Paulette Edwards show, Lee spoke candidly about his decision to establish a group for those affected by bereavement by suicide in his local area. The interview was broadcast on BBC Radio in March 2020. He has also spoken openly in the press about losing his brother to suicide and the difficulties of getting help for those left behind.

Lee was divorced with three children, He suffered episodes of depression after his brother's suicide. In 2017, he established a mental health forum in Barnsley, run by volunteers.

== Books ==
- The Radio (2013)
- The Page (2015)
- A Tiny Feeling of Fear (2015)
- Broken Branches (2017)
- Drift Stumble Fall (2018)
- 337 (2020)
- One Green Bottle (2026)
