= Lynching of John Lee =

1911 lynching

The body of John Lee with members of the lynch mob.

John Lee was an African-American man who was lynched on August 12, 1911, in Durant, Oklahoma. After attempting to rape a white woman who had given him some food, he shot her in the hip and through her abdomen, an injury from which the woman later died, while fleeing the scene. When a large mob found him, a brief shootout took place; Lee was killed, while he hit no one with his revolver. His body was set on fire. Afterward, the local black residents left after being subjected to threats and violence.

== Background ==
Durant, Oklahoma, in 1911, was situated in the heart of "Little Dixie," the southeastern Oklahoma region characterized by its cultural ties to the southern states. Following the turn of the century, a significant influx of new residents arrived in Oklahoma, primarily from southern states such as Texas, Arkansas, Tennessee, and Kentucky. This demographic shift contributed to the establishment of a new cultural identity in Bryan County, with a population predominantly comprising white residents at 86%, alongside a minority of African American residents at 7%.

The town of Caddo, Oklahoma, 14 miles northeast of Durant, had a small African American community on the east side of the MKT Railroad lines. Many of the residents worked as cooks, labors, and house keepers in Durant and the local area. Others living outside of Durant and Caddo city limits owned and worked their own farms. The community in Caddo was large enough to support a small church congregation, some businesses, and social activities like dances.

Although the citizens of Durant employed African Americans and interacted with them in agricultural business and as the county seat, in 1908 Durant touted itself, when lobbying for a state school location, that it was a moral city, “without Negros, dives, joints, or lawlessness; and as white as the dropping snow."

== Events leading to the lynching ==
John Lee's background before arriving in Durant remains largely unknown. He was reportedly staying at a railroad YMCA camp in Denison, Texas, under the alias Jim Jennigan and seen in Caddo for only a few days prior. It is suspected that John Lee was responsible for the robbery and murder of G. C. Freeman, the Secretary of the Denison YMCA, while in Armstrong, Oklahoma. Less than an hour before the attack on Campbell, Lee had beat, robbed, and kidnapped a black man, who manages to escape as he was being taken through the woods. Afterwards, Lee attempted to rob a store and burglarized a farm.

In the early afternoon of August 12, 1911, John Lee came to the house, between Durant and Caddo, of Fanny Campbell asking for food. She invited him in and gave him a meal. At the time Fanny Campbell was at the farm house with her 3 young children and her husband was in Durant on business. There are conflicting reports, but she was physically assaulted and possibly raped. As John Lee fled the house he fired 3 shots hitting Fanny Campbell in the hip and lower abdomen area.

Following the assault, Deputy Sheriff McFatridge, Chief Deputy Norman, and Constable Early led a large mob of 500 armed men gathered to search for John Lee. A large mob, numbering around 500 armed men and led by local deputies, pursued Lee. There was a brief shootout, with John Lee emptying his revolver and a "rain of bullets was poured into him." None of the mob was injured by his shots, while Lee's body was "torn to shreds."

John Lee's body was placed in an automobile and brought back to Durant. There Fanny Campbell was able to identify John Lee's body as her assailant. She was then taken to a hospital in Sherman, Texas, as her condition deteriorated. Fanny Campbell died during the night. The mob then moved to the railroad tracks adjacent to the train station. A pile of wood was assembled, the body was placed upon it and set on fire.

== Aftermath and legacy ==
Starting the following day local black families started to be cleared out by intimidation and force. Newspapers across the state talk about the mass exodus of black people from the area often walking away from their homes, land, and personal belongings. Throughout Durant and Caddo, signs were posted that all blacks had until next Saturday to leave the city and was signed "Kaddo Klan – Our motto is a clean town. Password: We Do."

Black community papers in Oklahoma openly discussed the injustice and called for equal protection under the law. This built into rumors of a black mob forming to attack Caddo and Durant via the railroad. Families from the surrounding area came into Durant, hundreds of dollars of ammunition were bought up, and people fortified themselves in their houses. A report was sent down the line from Atoka, Oklahoma, on August 15 that an armed black mob had stopped and boarded a freight train, but when it arrived at the stations it was empty.

On September 2, 1911, a gang of white men on horseback with torches surrounded the homes of the remaining black families living between Durant and Caddo. Shots were fired at the house and the homeowners fired back. A masked white man, 29-year-old Horace Gribble, was struck in the heart and killed instantly. Two black men were arrested and charged. Instead of taking them to Durant, where the county jail is located, the men were taken to Tishomingo, Oklahoma out of fear of another lynching. The two were not taken to trial seeing that it was an act of self-defense.

As a result of these acts the entire black community of Caddo was eliminated and Bryan County in the 1920 census only had a black population of 4.5%. A Durant commercial brochure from 1912 reported a city population of 8,000, “all white, ... no Negroes are allowed to pitch their tent within the city's confines, and none of them live within many miles of it”.
