= John Lea =

John Lea may refer to:

- John Lea (criminologist), British criminologist
- John Lea (Royal Navy officer) (1923–2015), Royal Navy officer
- John Lea (epidemiologist) (1782–1862), lay epidemiologist
- John McCormick Lea (1818–1903), American Whig politician and mayor of Nashville, Tennessee
- John Wheeley Lea (1791–1874), English pharmacist and sauce manufacturer
