= James Larry Edmondson =

American judge (born 1947)

James Edmondson

Senior Judge of the United States Court of Appeals for the Eleventh Circuit
- Incumbent
- Assumed office July 15, 2012

Chief Judge of the United States Court of Appeals for the Eleventh Circuit
- In office June 1, 2002 – May 31, 2009
- Preceded by: R. Lanier Anderson III
- Succeeded by: Joel Fredrick Dubina

Judge of the United States Court of Appeals for the Eleventh Circuit
- In office May 7, 1986 – July 15, 2012
- Appointed by: Ronald Reagan
- Preceded by: Albert John Henderson
- Succeeded by: Julie E. Carnes

Personal details
- Born: James Larry Edmondson; July 14, 1947 (age 78); Jasper, Georgia, U.S.
- Education: Emory University (BA); University of Georgia (JD); University of Virginia (LLM)

James Larry Edmondson (born July 14, 1947) is a Senior United States circuit judge of the United States Court of Appeals for the Eleventh Circuit.

== Education and early career ==
Born in Jasper, Georgia, Edmondson received a Bachelor of Arts degree from Emory University in 1968, a Juris Doctor from the University of Georgia School of Law in 1971, and a Master of Laws in Judicial Process from the University of Virginia School of Law in 1990.

Edmondson clerked for Judge Sidney Oslin Smith Jr. of the United States District Court for the Northern District of Georgia from 1971 to 1973. He was an attorney in private practice in Jasper during 1973, and in Lawrenceville, Georgia from 1973 to 1986. Edmondson also taught as a law professor at the University of Georgia from 1975 to 1984.

== Federal judicial service ==
On March 26, 1986, Edmondson was nominated by President Ronald Reagan to a seat on the United States Court of Appeals for the Eleventh Circuit. vacated by Judge Albert John Henderson. Edmondson was confirmed by the United States Senate on April 29, 1986, and received his commission on May 7, 1986. He served as Chief Judge from 2002 to 2009. Edmondson assumed senior status on July 15, 2012.

== Notable case ==
In 2000, Edmondson, as part of a 3-judge panel with Judges Joel Fredrick Dubina and Charles R. Wilson, issued the opinion that ultimately led to Elian Gonzalez being sent back to Cuba to be reunited with his father.

== Sources ==
Legal offices
Preceded by Albert John Henderson	Judge of the United States Court of Appeals for the Eleventh Circuit; 1986–2012	Succeeded by Julie E. Carnes
Preceded by R. Lanier Anderson III	Chief Judge of the United States Court of Appeals for the Eleventh Circuit; 2002–2009	Succeeded by Joel Fredrick Dubina
