= Jack Tarpley Camp Jr. =

American judge (born 1943)

Jack Camp
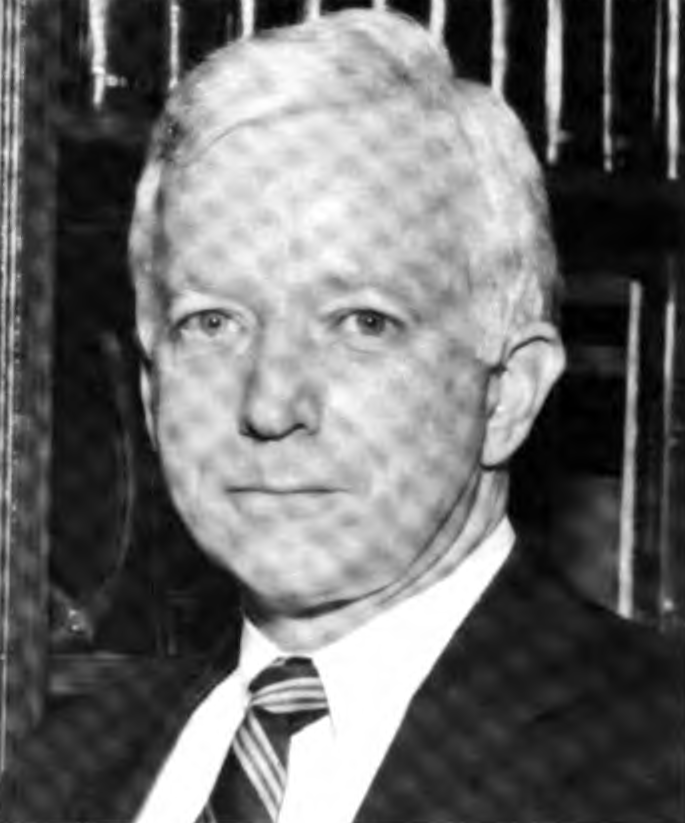

Senior Judge of the United States District Court for the Northern District of Georgia
- In office December 31, 2008 – November 19, 2010

Chief Judge of the United States District Court for the Northern District of Georgia
- In office 2006–2008
- Preceded by: Orinda Dale Evans
- Succeeded by: Julie E. Carnes

Judge of the United States District Court for the Northern District of Georgia
- In office April 20, 1988 – December 31, 2008
- Appointed by: Ronald Reagan
- Preceded by: Charles Allen Moye Jr.
- Succeeded by: Amy Totenberg

Personal details
- Born: Jack Tarpley Camp Jr. October 30, 1943 (age 82) Newnan, Georgia, U.S.
- Party: Republican
- Education: The Citadel (BA); University of Virginia (MA, JD)

Jack Tarpley Camp Jr. (born October 30, 1943) is a former United States district judge of the United States District Court for the Northern District of Georgia. A Republican, he was nominated by Ronald Reagan, and retired from the bench in November 2010 after pleading guilty to drug related charges, including a felony count for giving a stripper cocaine even though he knew she was a convicted felon.

== Early life and education ==
Born in Newnan, Georgia, Camp received a Bachelor of Arts degree from The Citadel in 1965, a Master of Arts in history from the University of Virginia in 1967, and a Juris Doctor from the University of Virginia School of Law in 1973. Camp won a Ford Foundation fellowship to study history at the University of Virginia.

Camp grew up on a working farm in Moreland, Georgia a few miles from Newnan, that had been in his family more than a century. He still owns a 175-acre farm in Coweta County.

== Military career ==
Camp was in the United States Army from 1967 to 1970, and in the United States Army Reserve from 1970 to 1986. He joined the Army as a lieutenant.

He arrived in South Vietnam in 1968, shortly after the Tet Offensive, and was assigned to military intelligence. He spent the first part of his tour in the interrogation section and the second part in visual reconnaissance that often involved patrolling the Ho Chi Minh trail (the major northsouth route for the North Vietnamese armies) from the air.

According to Camp, "It was an exciting tour", "I never would have volunteered for Vietnam. But it was the event of my generation," the judge said, and, as such, he has never regretted his service there.

== Legal career ==
Camp noted that television programs and movies contributed to the aura of lawyers. "I really do believe more members of my generation went to law school because of 'To Kill a Mockingbird,'"—the movie based on Harper Lee's book starring Gregory Peck as the highly principled lawyer Atticus Finch, Camp said. "It came out while I was in college."

He was in private practice in Birmingham, Alabama from 1973 to 1975, and in Newnan from 1975 to 1988.

Camp remembered winning a jury acquittal in Pike County of a client who had shot and killed someone. While he was sitting at the counsel table after the verdict had been rendered, the widow of the dead man suddenly came down the courtroom aisle, pushed past the bar, waving a large butcher knife. "She was coming after my client," Camp recalled. "But I was between my client and her." The assistant district attorney tackled her less than five feet from Camp.

He said he got a call a short time later from the local prosecutor telling him that, "if you don't mind," he intended to drop charges against the widow, adding, "This woman was just upset." Noted the judge, "That wouldn't happen in federal court."

== Federal judicial career ==
When Camp was nearing 45, United States District Judge Charles Allen Moye Jr. announced he was taking senior status. Camp, who had never been a judge nor active in local politics, was restless to try something new.

After he read of Moye's pending retirement, Camp said his law partners "talked me into" applying for the job. At the time, one of his partners was John Stuckey, then the state chairman of the Republican Party. "He vouched for my party credentials," the judge said. "I had never been active in party politics."

Georgia's United States Senators, Sam Nunn and Wyche Fowler, both of whom Camp knew, also vouched for him.

=== Nomination ===
On December 18, 1987, Camp was nominated by President Reagan to a seat on the United States District Court for the Northern District of Georgia vacated by Moye. Camp was confirmed by the United States Senate on April 19, 1988, and received his commission on April 20, 1988. He served as Chief Judge from 2006 to 2008.

After Camp was nominated, Fowler introduced him to the Senate Judiciary Committee.

=== Senate Judiciary Committee ===
That fall, after a series of contentious hearings, the Senate rejected Reagan's United States Supreme Court nomination of Robert Bork, then a judge on the United States Court of Appeals for the District of Columbia Circuit. By the time Camp appeared before the Senate Judiciary Committee, it was near the end of Reagan's second term, and the Senate had failed to confirm 35 of his judicial nominees.

But with the support of both of Georgia's Democratic senators and United States Senator Strom Thurmond of South Carolina, then the ranking Republican on the Judiciary Committee, Camp said his nomination was approved. Thurmond backed Camp because he was a The Citadel graduate, the judge recalled, telling the Senate committee, "All you need to know about this next man is that he graduated from the finest military institution in the country."

=== Notable cases ===
Larry Lonchar: In 1995 Camp issued a temporary stay of execution for convicted killer Larry Lonchar two hours before he was to die. Lonchar claimed he wanted to be executed but contended that he wanted to die by lethal injection, not in the electric chair, to preserve his organs for donation. The stay was later overturned by the Eleventh Circuit Court of Appeals.

Secretary of State Karen Handel: Camp has handled several voting rights cases and sat on a three-judge panel with U.S. District Judge William S. Duffey Jr. and Eleventh U.S. Circuit Judge Stanley F. Birch Jr. regarding a request for an injunction against Georgia's Secretary of State Handel. The case centered on Handel's decision to purge voter lists statewide and her notice to more than 50,000 registered voters that they were potentially ineligible to vote. The panel decided that voters flagged as potentially ineligible could vote in the election but would have to use a challenged ballot.

DeKalb County Sheriff-elect Derwin Brown assassination: Melvin D. Walker and David I. Ramsey were charged with joining in the December 2000 assassination of DeKalb County Sheriff-elect Derwin Brown. DeKalb Sheriff Sidney Dorsey, whom Brown had beaten in a runoff election in the fall of 2000, was eventually convicted of arranging Brown's murder. Walker, a deputy and former Marine sharpshooter, had been identified as the triggerman who pumped 12 bullets into Brown. Ramsey was identified as one of the backup shooters at the scene. After a DeKalb jury acquitted Walker and Ramsey of Brown's murder in 2002, federal prosecutors launched their own investigation, securing a grand jury indictment in 2004 charging the two men with using interstate communications—cell phones—to facilitate Brown's murder. Camp sentenced the two men to serve life without parole.

Physician Philip Astin: Philip C. Astin, III, 52, of Carrollton, Georgia, was sentenced by Camp to serve 10 years in federal prison for his conviction on 175 counts of illegally dispensing prescription drugs from 2002 until his arrest in 2007.

State Representative Walter Ronnie Sailor, Jr.: Walter Ronnie ("Ron") Sailor, Jr., 33, of Norcross, Georgia, was sentenced by Camp on charges of money laundering and wire fraud.

Professional Wrestler "Hardbody" Harrison Norris: Cedric Jackson, 41, of Atlanta, Georgia and Aimee Allen, 37, formerly of Cartersville, Georgia, and now of Clarence, New York, were sentenced by Camp on charges of conspiracy to engage in sex trafficking, related to a sex trafficking organization led by former professional wrestler Harrison Norris Jr. Michelle Achuff, 25, of Lafayette, Tennessee, and Leslie Smith, 22, of Macon, Georgia, were also sentenced for making false statements to FBI agents regarding Norris' criminal activities.

=== Senior status ===
After he turned 65 in October 2008, Camp notified President George W. Bush that he would be taking senior status on December 31, 2008.

== Arrest and conviction ==
=== Arrest on drug and gun charges ===
On October 1, 2010, Camp, who is married with two grown children, was arrested by the Federal Bureau of Investigation. On October 4, Camp was arraigned in the United States District Court for the Northern District of Georgia on charges of purchasing the drugs cocaine, marijuana, hydrocodone and roxicodone, which he shared with an exotic dancer with whom he was having sexual relations for the previous several months. He was also charged with firearms possession. He was released on $50,000 bond. The stripper, who had a previous drug conviction, had been working with the FBI, in exchange for which no charges would be brought against her.

According to the complaint by the FBI agent, from Spring 2010 through about October 1, 2010, Camp had possessed controlled substances and firearms in violation of Title 21 of the United States Code, Sections 844(a), 846, and Title 18 of the United States Code, Sections 922(g)(3) and 2.

Camp was charged with four drug-related charges and one count of firearm possession while illegally using drugs.

=== Implications for federal judge ===
Judges and attorneys in Georgia, Washington, D.C., and Alabama sought to find someone to oversee the criminal case against Camp and to reassign his caseload. Camp agreed to allow the District Court to reassign all of his pending civil and criminal cases to another judge and to step down from the bench in what was "analogous to a leave of absence" with pay.

The entire Northern District of Georgia bench was recused, and Camp first appeared before a visiting U.S. magistrate judge from the Middle District of Alabama in Montgomery. Another visiting judge, United States District Judge J. Frederick Motz of the District of Maryland, was named temporarily by Chief Justice John Roberts to preside over Camp's criminal case.

Joel F. Dubina, Chief Judge of the Eleventh Circuit, said that after consulting with general counsel of the Administrative Office of U.S. Courts, he had postponed taking any action regarding misconduct proceedings against Camp until after the criminal charges were resolved. Federal rules give Dubina the authority to appoint a committee of circuit and district judges to investigate judicial misconduct.

=== Guilty plea and retirement ===
On November 19, 2010, Camp pleaded guilty to the felony charge of aiding and abetting a felon's possession of a controlled substance and to two misdemeanors: illegally giving the stripper his government-issued laptop and possession of illegal drugs. As part of the plea, Camp retired from the bench. Prosecutors requested that Camp serve at least 15 days in custody, with sentencing initially set for March 4, 2011. On March 11, 2011, Camp was sentenced to 30 days in prison, plus a fine and community service.

== Sources ==
- R. Robin McDonald (December 23, 2008). "Camp reflects on career in the law" (PDF). Daily Report.

Legal offices
Preceded by Charles Allen Moye Jr.	Judge of the United States District Court for the Northern District of Georgia; 1988–2008	Succeeded by Amy Totenberg
Preceded by Orinda Dale Evans	Chief Judge of the United States District Court for the Northern District of Georgia; 2006–2008	Succeeded by Julie E. Carnes
