= Beth Brinkmann =

American lawyer (born 1958)

Personal details
- Born: September 24, 1958 (age 67) Toledo, Ohio, U.S.
- Party: Democratic
- Education: University of California, Berkeley (BA); Yale University (JD)

Beth S. Brinkmann (born September 24, 1958) is an American lawyer who served as Deputy Assistant Attorney General in the United States Department of Justice, heading up the appellate staff in the DOJ's Civil Division during the administration of President Barack Obama. She also served as Assistant to the Solicitor General of the United States from 1993 through 2001. Brinkmann has argued 25 cases before the United States Supreme Court both in that role and in her later role as a partner in the Washington, D.C. office of the firm Morrison & Foerster. Currently, Brinkmann is a partner at the Covington & Burling law firm in Washington, D.C.

== Early professional career ==
Brinkmann graduated Phi Beta Kappa in 1980 with a bachelor's degree from the University of California, Berkeley, and earned her J.D. degree from Yale Law School in 1985. She served as a law clerk to Judge Phyllis A. Kravitch of the U.S. Court of Appeals for the Eleventh Circuit. Brinkmann then served as a law clerk to Justice Harry Blackmun of the U.S. Supreme Court from 1986 to 1987. Brinkmann then worked for four years as an associate with the small San Francisco litigation firm of Turner & Brorby, after which she served as an assistant federal public defender from 1991 through 1993 in Washington, D.C.

== Work in the Solicitor General's office ==
Brinkmann became assistant to the U.S. Solicitor General in December 1993. She argued her first case before the Supreme Court on March 23, 1994. Brinkmann was the tenth woman hired as an assistant to the Solicitor General, with five more women hired during her eight years in that office. She is one of 726 women who have argued before the Supreme Court, from the first in 1880 through 2016.

== Private practice ==
After leaving the Solicitor General's office, Brinkmann joined Morrison & Foerster in early 2002. As a partner at Morrison & Foerster and the chair of the firm's Appellate Practice Group, Brinkmann continued to argue cases before the U.S. Supreme Court. "Every time you go up there, it is amazing, and an honor and privilege being there. You also feel very patriotic—at least I do," Brinkmann told the National Journal in 2002. In a November 20, 2007 article in the Chicago Daily Law Bulletin, Brinkmann told the paper that she had argued 22 cases before the Supreme Court in her career. Eighteen of those times were as a staff lawyer in the Solicitor General's office, Brinkmann told ABA Journal in an article that ran in the magazine's March 2005 issue.

== Work in the Obama administration ==
On April 3, 2009, Brinkmann was tapped to join the United States Department of Justice as the Deputy Assistant Attorney General heading up the Appellate staff in the DOJ's Civil Division. After Obama left office, Brinkmann joined the law firm of Covington & Burling.

== Possible future federal judicial service ==
In the March 12, 2008, issue of The New Republic, writer Jeffrey Rosen floated Brinkmann's name as a future federal appeals-court judge or Supreme Court justice, likening her to Chief Justice John Roberts by suggesting her as a possible "Democratic female John Roberts". Rosen also characterized Brinkmann as "moderate, pragmatic and pro-business".

== Theater ==
Playing the role of attorney for Electra, in June 2019 in Washington, D.C. Brinkmann participated in the Shakespeare Theatre Company's Oresteia mock trial, based on the Orestia trilogy by the ancient Greek tragedian Aeschylus.

== See also ==
- List of law clerks for the second seat of the Supreme Court of the United States
- Barack Obama Supreme Court candidates
