= Judge Story =

Judge Story may refer to:

- Richard W. Story (born 1953), judge of the United States District Court for the Northern District of Georgia
- William Story (attorney) (1843–1921), judge of the United States District Court for the Western District of Arkansas

== See also ==
- Joseph Story (1779–1845), associate justice of the Supreme Court of the United States
