= Julie E. Carnes =

American judge (born 1950)

Julie Carnes
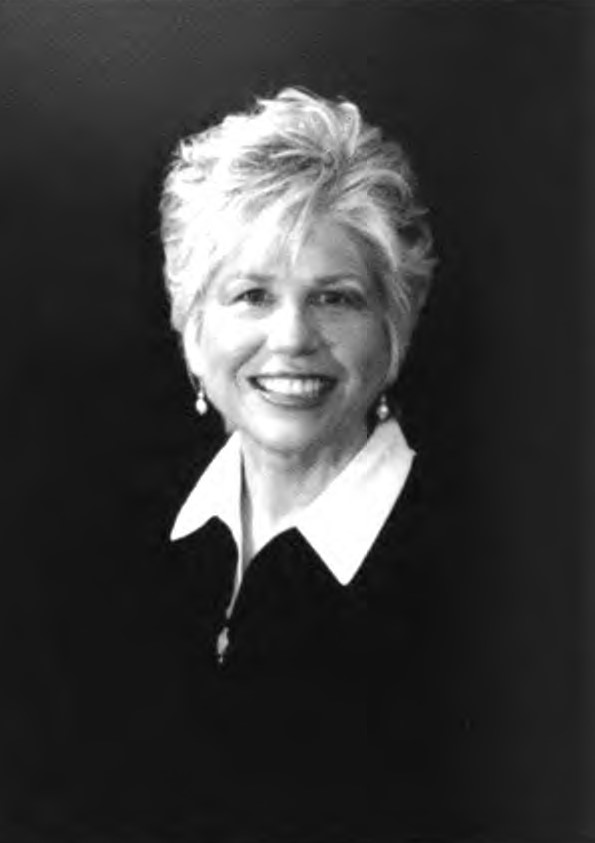

Senior Judge of the United States Court of Appeals for the Eleventh Circuit
- Incumbent
- Assumed office June 18, 2018

Judge of the United States Court of Appeals for the Eleventh Circuit
- In office July 31, 2014 – June 18, 2018
- Appointed by: Barack Obama
- Preceded by: James Larry Edmondson
- Succeeded by: Britt Grant

Chief Judge of the United States District Court for the Northern District of Georgia
- In office January 1, 2009 – July 31, 2014
- Preceded by: Jack Tarpley Camp Jr.
- Succeeded by: Thomas W. Thrash Jr.

Judge of the United States District Court for the Northern District of Georgia
- In office February 10, 1992 – July 31, 2014
- Appointed by: George H. W. Bush
- Preceded by: Robert Howell Hall
- Succeeded by: Michael Lawrence Brown

Personal details
- Born: Julie Elizabeth Carnes; October 31, 1950 (age 74); Atlanta, Georgia, U.S.
- Education: University of Georgia (BA, JD)

Julie Elizabeth Carnes (born October 31, 1950) is an American judge who is a senior United States circuit judge of the United States Court of Appeals for the Eleventh Circuit.

== Early life and education ==
Born in Atlanta, Georgia, Carnes is the daughter of Georgia state court judge Charles Carnes. She received a Bachelor of Arts degree from the University of Georgia in 1972 and a Juris Doctor from the University of Georgia School of Law in 1975. She was a law clerk to Judge Lewis Render Morgan of the United States Court of Appeals for the Fifth Circuit from 1975 to 1977.

== Professional career ==
Carnes was an Assistant United States Attorney in the U.S. Attorney's Office for the Northern District of Georgia, from 1978 to 1990 and was Appellate Chief of the Criminal Division from 1987 to 1989. She was a member of the U.S. Attorney General's Advisory Committee on Sentencing Guidelines from 1988 to 1990 and was a Special Counsel to the U.S. Sentencing Commission in 1989 and a Commissioner on the U.S. Sentencing Commission from 1990 to 1996.

== Federal judicial service ==
On August 1, 1991, Carnes was nominated by President George H. W. Bush to a seat on the United States District Court for the Northern District of Georgia vacated by Robert Howell Hall. She was confirmed by the United States Senate on February 6, 1992, and received her commission on February 10, 1992. From 2009 to 2014 she served as chief judge. Her service as a district court judge was terminated on July 31, 2014, when she was elevated to the court of appeals.

On December 19, 2013, President Barack Obama nominated Carnes to the United States Court of Appeals for the Eleventh Circuit that was vacated by Judge James Larry Edmondson, who assumed senior status on July 15, 2012. She received a hearing before the United States Senate Judiciary Committee on May 13, 2014. On June 19, 2014, her nomination was reported out of committee by a voice vote. On July 16, 2014, Senate Majority Leader Harry Reid filed a cloture motion on Carnes' nomination. On July 17, 2014, the United States Senate invoked cloture on her nomination by a 68–23 vote. On July 21, 2014, her nomination was confirmed by a 94–0 vote. She received her judicial commission on July 31, 2014. She assumed senior status on June 18, 2018.

Carnes is unrelated to Edward Earl Carnes, with whom she serves on the Eleventh Circuit.

== Notes ==
Legal offices
Preceded by Robert Howell Hall	Judge of the United States District Court for the Northern District of Georgia; 1992–2014	Succeeded by Michael Lawrence Brown
Preceded by Jack Tarpley Camp Jr.	Chief Judge of the United States District Court for the Northern District of Georgia; 2009–2014	Succeeded by Thomas W. Thrash Jr.
Preceded by James Larry Edmondson	Judge of the United States Court of Appeals for the Eleventh Circuit; 2014–2018	Succeeded by Britt Grant
