= Edenfield (surname) =

Edenfield is a surname. Notable people with the surname include:

- Berry Avant Edenfield (1934–2015), American judge and politician
- Ken Edenfield (born 1967), American baseball player
- Kenny Edenfield (born 1965), American football coach
- Newell Edenfield (1911–1981), American judge and United States Navy officer
