= Robert L. Vining Jr. =

American lawyer and judge (1931–2022)

Senior Judge of the United States District Court for the Northern District of Georgia
- In office March 31, 1996 – September 1, 2022

Chief Judge of the United States District Court for the Northern District of Georgia
- In office 1995–1996
- Preceded by: William Clark O'Kelley
- Succeeded by: George Ernest Tidwell

Judge of the United States District Court for the Northern District of Georgia
- In office July 24, 1979 – March 31, 1996
- Appointed by: Jimmy Carter
- Preceded by: Seat established by 92 Stat. 1629
- Succeeded by: Thomas W. Thrash Jr.

Judge of the Conasauga Judicial Circuit, Georgia Superior Court
- In office January 14, 1969 – July 24, 1979
- Preceded by: James T. Pope, Jr.
- Succeeded by: Charles A. Pannell Jr.

District Attorney of the Conasauga Judicial Circuit, Georgia Superior Court
- In office March 22, 1963 – January 1, 1969
- Preceded by: position established
- Succeeded by: Robert B. Adams

Personal details
- Born: March 30, 1931 Chatsworth, Georgia, U.S.
- Died: September 1, 2022 (aged 91) Dalton, Georgia, U.S.
- Party: Democratic
- Spouse: Martha S. Cate
- Education: Georgia Military College; University of Georgia (BA, JD)

Military service
- Branch/service: United States Air Force
- Years of service: 1951–1955
- Rank: Staff Sergeant
- Awards: Good Conduct Medal; Presidential Unit Citation

Robert Luke Vining Jr. (March 30, 1931 – September 1, 2022) was an American lawyer who served as a United States district judge of the United States District Court for the Northern District of Georgia from 1979 to 2022.

== Education and career ==
Born in Chatsworth, Georgia, Vining was a United States Air Force staff Sergeant from 1951 to 1955. He received a Bachelor of Arts degree from the University of Georgia in 1959 and a Juris Doctor from the University of Georgia School of Law in 1959. He was in private practice in Dalton, Georgia from 1958 to 1969, serving as solicitor general of the Conasauga Judicial Circuit from 1963 to 1968. He was a superior court judge of the Conasauga Judicial Circuit from 1969 to 1979.

== Federal judicial service ==
On June 14, 1979, Vining was nominated by President Jimmy Carter to a new seat on the United States District Court for the Northern District of Georgia created by 92 Stat. 1629. He was confirmed by the United States Senate on July 23, 1979, and received his commission on July 24, 1979. He served as Chief Judge from 1995 to 1996, assuming senior status on March 31, 1996.

== Personal life and death ==
Vining died on September 1, 2022, at the age of 91.

== Sources ==
Legal offices
Preceded by Seat established by 92 Stat. 1629	Judge of the United States District Court for the Northern District of Georgia; 1979–1996	Succeeded by Thomas W. Thrash Jr.
Preceded by William Clark O'Kelley	Chief Judge of the United States District Court for the Northern District of Georgia; 1995–1996	Succeeded by George Ernest Tidwell
