= Steve C. Jones =

American judge (born 1957)

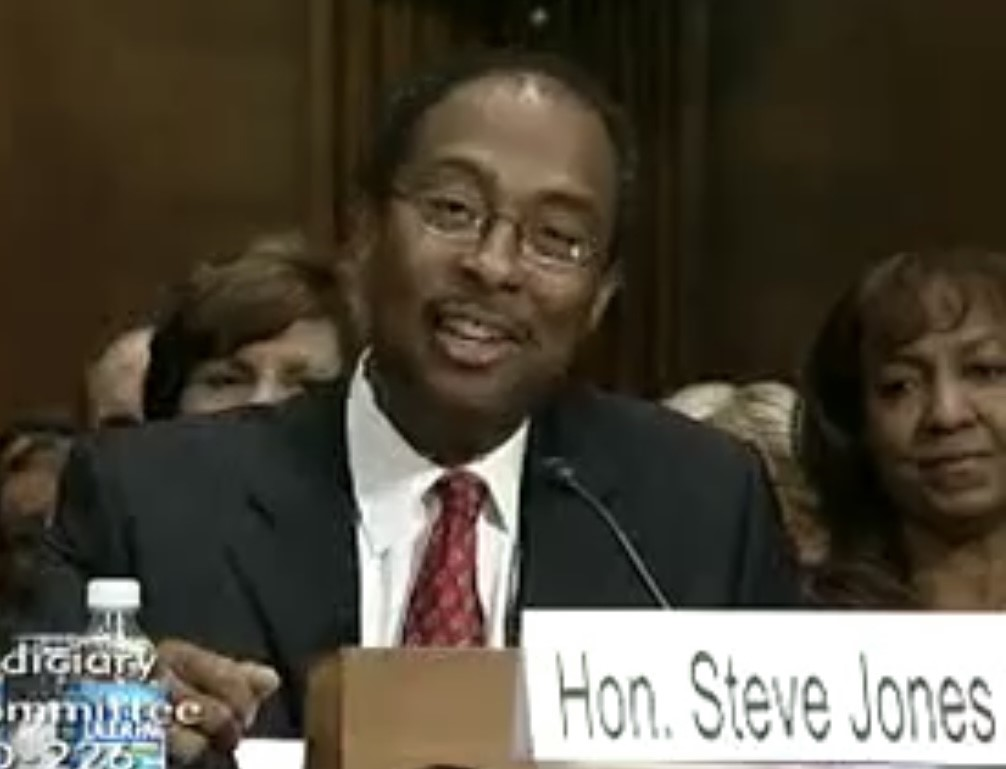

Senior Judge of the United States District Court for the Northern District of Georgia
- Incumbent
- Assumed office January 1, 2025

Judge of the United States District Court for the Northern District of Georgia
- In office March 3, 2011 – January 1, 2025
- Appointed by: Barack Obama
- Preceded by: Orinda Dale Evans
- Succeeded by: Tiffany R. Johnson

Judge of the Georgia Superior Court for the Western Judicial Circuit
- In office 1995–2011
- Appointed by: Zell Miller

Judge of the Municipal Court of Athens-Clarke County
- In office 1993–1995

Personal details
- Born: Steve CarMichael Jones; January 26, 1957 (age 69) Athens, Georgia, U.S.
- Education: University of Georgia (BBA, JD)

Steve CarMichael Jones (born January 26, 1957) is a senior United States district judge for the United States District Court for the Northern District of Georgia and a former judge of the Georgia Superior Court.

== Early life and education ==
Jones was born and raised in Athens, Georgia and graduated from Cedar Shoals High School. He received a Bachelor of Business Administration degree from University of Georgia in 1978. He then ran the Child Support Recovery Office for the local district attorney for six years. Jones is a graduate of the University of Georgia School of Law, receiving his Juris Doctor in 1987. He then worked as an assistant district attorney until 1993.

== Judicial career ==
=== Georgia state judicial service ===
Jones served as a municipal court judge in Athens-Clarke County from 1993 to 1995. In 1995, Gov. Zell Miller appointed Jones to be a Georgia Superior Court judge for the Western Judicial Circuit, which includes Clarke and Oconee counties.

=== Federal judicial service ===
In April 2009, Jones was one of three candidates recommended by Democratic members of the Georgia House delegation to replace judge Hugh Lawson on the United States District Court for the Middle District of Georgia. Jones did not receive the nomination, which went to Macon attorney Marc T. Treadwell in February 2010.

After Jones was passed over for the Middle District of Georgia, which serves his hometown of Athens, Jones received consideration for a judgeship on the Atlanta-based United States District Court for the Northern District of Georgia. On July 14, 2010, President Barack Obama nominated Jones to replace Orinda D. Evans on the Northern District of Georgia. His nomination was confirmed by the Senate on February 28, 2011 by a 90–0 vote. He received his commission March 3, 2011. He assumed senior status on January 1, 2025.

=== Notable decisions ===
Awaiting a decision in a Louisiana abortion case pending before the U.S. Supreme Court, in October 2019, Jones issued a temporary injunction against enforcement of a new Georgia law regulating abortions that was to go into effect January 1, 2020. The law is one of the nation’s strictest as it outlaws abortion in most cases once fetal cardiac activity can be detected. After the U.S. Supreme Court ruling struck down the Louisiana abortion law on July 13, 2020, Jones issued his final order striking down the Georgia law, finding the statute violated a woman’s constitutional right to access to abortion as established by the 1973 U.S. Supreme Court ruling in Roe v. Wade. Jones wrote, “It is in the public interest, and is this court’s duty, to ensure constitutional rights are protected.” The ruling reinstated Georgia's previous statute passed in 2012 allowing abortions through 20 weeks of gestation, or approximately 22 weeks of pregnancy. A spokesman for the Georgia Attorney General’s Office said the state would appeal the ruling.

On December 17, 2019, Jones appeared in multiple news headlines after declining in an interlocutory order to stop a purge of 309,000 Georgia voters from the state's list of registered voters. Jones later found that plaintiff Fair Fight Action and other plaintiffs had not shown that they were likely to prevail on the question of constitutionality, but wrote that the State of Georgia was required to conduct “additional diligent and reasonable efforts” to make people aware of the need of canceled voters to re-register, and that the plaintiffs could seek “emergency relief” utilizing a state court that was better suited to deal with the matter. Georgia is one of nine states with a law allowing voters to be removed from the list of registered voters for inactivity, under the latest statute anyone who has three years of voting inactivity followed by non-voting in two federal election cycles and then failing to respond to a notice mailed out by the secretary of state’s office being eligible for removal. However Republican Secretary of State for Georgia, Brad Raffensperger was purging voters years before the legal deadline set in the new legislation based on a prior statute. Lawyers for Fair Fight Action contested this purge, and Fair Fight's CEO Lauren Groh-Wargo argued, "Georgians should not lose their right to vote simply because they have not expressed that right in recent elections." Articles by The Atlanta Journal-Constitution added in context that Fair Fight Action has also been challenging other obstacles that have previously prevented Georgia voters from being able to vote including rejections of absentee ballots, long lines at the polls, and precinct closures that have disproportionately harmed the ability of African Americans to vote in prior years, which could have prevented voters from voting previously and resulted in their placement on the inactive voters list. The list of past voters that Jones did not enjoin from being purged does not have any included data regarding racial disparities among the affected voters.

On January 2, 2024, Jones ruled that right-wing group True the Vote's challenging of 364,000 voter registrations did not amount to "voter intimidation".

== Personal life ==
Jones is married to Lillian Kincey, a teacher.

== See also ==
- List of African-American federal judges
- List of African-American jurists

Legal offices
Preceded by Orinda Dale Evans	Judge of the United States District Court for the Northern District of Georgia; 2011–2025	Succeeded by Tiffany R. Johnson
