= Stanley F. Birch Jr. =

American judge (born 1945)

Stanley Birch

Judge of the United States Court of Appeals for the Eleventh Circuit
- In office May 14, 1990 – August 29, 2010
- Appointed by: George H. W. Bush
- Preceded by: James Clinkscales Hill
- Succeeded by: Jill A. Pryor

Personal details
- Born: Stanley Francis Birch Jr. August 29, 1945 (age 80) Langley Field, Virginia, U.S.
- Party: Republican
- Spouse: Margaret Sutton
- Education: University of Virginia (BA); Emory University (JD, LLM)

Military service
- Branch/service: United States Army
- Years of service: 1970–1972
- Rank: First Lieutenant

Stanley Francis Birch Jr. (born August 29, 1945) is a former United States circuit judge of the United States Court of Appeals for the Eleventh Circuit.

== Education and career ==
Birch was born in Langley Field, Virginia. He received his Bachelor of Arts degree from the University of Virginia in 1967. He received his Juris Doctor and Master of Laws from Emory University School of Law in 1970 and 1976, respectively. He was a United States Army Lieutenant from 1970 to 1972. He was a law clerk for Judge Sidney Oslin Smith Jr. of United States District Court for the Northern District of Georgia from 1972 to 1974. He had been in private practice in Gainesville, Georgia from 1974 to 1984, and in Atlanta, Georgia from 1984 to 1990.

== Federal judicial service ==
Birch was nominated by President George H. W. Bush on March 22, 1990, for the United States Court of Appeals for the Eleventh Circuit to a seat vacated by Judge James Clinkscales Hill. He was confirmed by the United States Senate on May 11, 1990, and received his commission on May 14, 1990. Birch retired from judicial service on August 29, 2010.

== Selected rulings ==
- Concurring opinion on the Terri Schiavo case

== Notes ==
Legal offices
Preceded by James Clinkscales Hill	Judge of the United States Court of Appeals for the Eleventh Circuit; 1990–2010	Succeeded by Jill A. Pryor
