= J. P. Boulee =

American judge (born 1971)

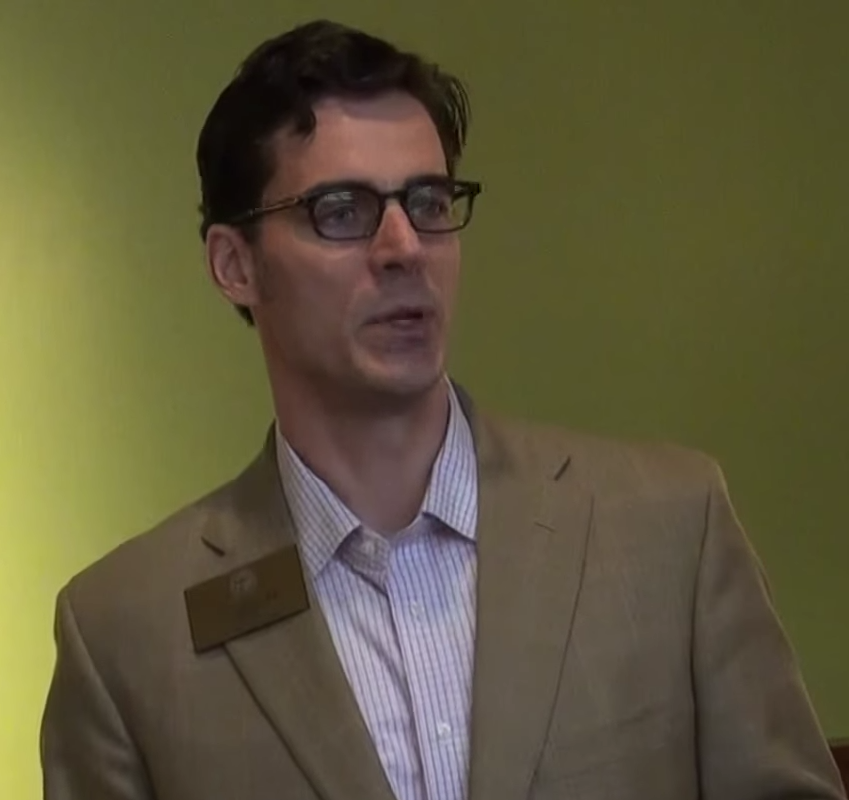

Judge of the United States District Court for the Northern District of Georgia
- Incumbent
- Assumed office June 14, 2019
- Appointed by: Donald Trump
- Preceded by: William S. Duffey Jr.

Judge of the Georgia Superior Court for the Stone Mountain Judicial Circuit
- In office May 12, 2015 – June 14, 2019
- Appointed by: Nathan Deal
- Preceded by: Cynthia J. Becker
- Succeeded by: Stacey Hydrick

Personal details
- Born: Jean-Paul Boulee; January 31, 1971 (age 55) Kankakee, Illinois, U.S.
- Education: Washington and Lee University (BA); University of Georgia (JD)

Military service
- Allegiance: United States
- Branch/service: United States Army (1993–2001); United States Army Inactive Ready Reserve (1993–1997)
- Rank: Captain
- Unit: 101st Airborne Division; United States Army Judge Advocate General's Corps
- Awards: See list: Army Achievement Medal

Jean-Paul "J. P." Boulee (born January 31, 1971) is a United States district judge of the United States District Court for the Northern District of Georgia.

== Education ==
Boulee earned his Bachelor of Arts, magna cum laude, from Washington and Lee University, where he participated in Army Reserve Officers' Training Corps and was the Distinguished Military Graduate, and his Juris Doctor, cum laude, from the University of Georgia School of Law.

== Legal career ==
Upon graduation from law school, Boulee served as a law clerk to Judge Orinda Dale Evans of the United States District Court for the Northern District of Georgia. Boulee then served as a Captain in the United States Army Judge Advocate General's Corps, where he tried dozens of cases as both a prosecutor and defense attorney.

Boulee then became a partner in the Atlanta office of Jones Day, where he was a member of the Corporate Criminal Investigations and Business and Tort Litigation practice groups, and worked there until becoming a state judge.

== State court service ==
Boulee served as a judge of the Dekalb County Superior Court, where he founded the DeKalb County Veterans Treatment Court and is a member of the State Bar of Georgia's Judicial Procedure and Administration/Uniform Rules Committee. He was appointed to the court on May 12, 2015, by Governor Nathan Deal; he replaced Judge Cynthia J. Becker who retired in March 2015. His state court service ended in 2019 upon his elevation to the federal bench.

== Federal judicial service ==
On August 27, 2018, President Donald Trump announced his intent to nominate Boulee to serve as a United States district judge of the United States District Court for the Northern District of Georgia. Upon the announcement of his nomination, both Georgia Senators Johnny Isakson and David Perdue voiced their support. On August 28, 2018, his nomination was sent to the Senate. He was nominated to the seat vacated by Judge William S. Duffey Jr., who retired on July 1, 2018. On November 13, 2018, a hearing on his nomination was held before the Senate Judiciary Committee.

On January 3, 2019, his nomination was returned to the President under Rule XXXI, Paragraph 6 of the United States Senate. On January 23, 2019, President Trump announced his intent to renominate Boulee for a federal judgeship. His nomination was sent to the Senate later that day. On February 7, 2019, his nomination was reported out of committee by a 22–0 vote. On June 11, 2019, the Senate invoked cloture on his nomination by a 84–12 vote. On June 12, 2019, his nomination was confirmed by an 85–11 vote. He received his judicial commission on June 14, 2019.

== Electoral history ==
2016

Georgia Superior Court results, May 24, 2016
Party	Candidate	Votes	%
Nonpartisan	J. P. Boulee (incumbent)	51,809	100.00%
Majority		51,809	100.00%
Total votes		51,809	100.00%

Legal offices
Preceded by Cynthia J. Becker	Judge of the Georgia Superior Court for the Stone Mountain Judicial Circuit; 2015–2019	Succeeded by Stacey Hydrick
Preceded by William S. Duffey Jr.	Judge of the United States District Court for the Northern District of Georgia; 2019–present	Incumbent
