= Judge Camp =

Judge Camp may refer to:

- Jack Tarpley Camp Jr. (born 1943), judge of the United States District Court for the Northern District of Georgia
- Laurie Smith Camp (1953–2020), judge of the United States District Court for the District of Nebraska
