= Judge Edenfield =

Judge Edenfield may refer to:

- Berry Avant Edenfield (1934–2015), judge of the United States District Court for the Southern District of Georgia
- Newell Edenfield (1911–1981), judge of the United States District Court for the Northern District of Georgia
