= Charles Allen Moye Jr. =

American judge

Senior Judge of the United States District Court for the Northern District of Georgia
- In office January 1, 1988 – July 26, 2010

Chief Judge of the United States District Court for the Northern District of Georgia
- In office 1979–1987
- Preceded by: Albert John Henderson
- Succeeded by: William Clark O'Kelley

Judge of the United States District Court for the Northern District of Georgia
- In office October 16, 1970 – January 1, 1988
- Appointed by: Richard Nixon
- Preceded by: Seat established by 84 Stat. 294
- Succeeded by: Jack Tarpley Camp Jr.

Personal details
- Born: Charles Allen Moye Jr. July 13, 1918 Atlanta, Georgia, U.S.
- Died: July 26, 2010 (aged 92) Atlanta, Georgia, U.S.
- Education: Emory University (BA, JD)

Charles Allen Moye Jr. (July 13, 1918 – July 26, 2010) was a United States district judge of the United States District Court for the Northern District of Georgia.

== Education and career ==
Born in Atlanta, Georgia, Moye received an Artium Baccalaureus degree from Emory University in 1939 and a Juris Doctor from Emory University School of Law in 1943. He was in private practice in Atlanta from 1943 to 1970, and was an unsuccessful candidate for the United States House of Representatives from Georgia in 1954.

== Federal judicial service ==
On October 7, 1970, Moye was nominated by President Richard Nixon to a new seat on the United States District Court for the Northern District of Georgia created by 84 Stat. 294. He was confirmed by the United States Senate on October 13, 1970, and received his commission on October 16, 1970. He served as Chief Judge from 1979 to 1987, assuming senior status on January 1, 1988. His service terminated on July 26, 2010, due to his death in Atlanta, Georgia.

== Electoral history ==
Year	Office	Republican	%	Democratic	%
1954	U.S House of Representatives, Georgia, District 5	Charles A. Moye	35.6%	√ James C. Davis	64.4%

== Sources ==
Legal offices
Preceded by Seat established by 84 Stat. 294	Judge of the United States District Court for the Northern District of Georgia; 1970–1988	Succeeded by Jack Tarpley Camp Jr.
Preceded by Albert John Henderson	Chief Judge of the United States District Court for the Northern District of Georgia; 1979–1987	Succeeded by William Clark O'Kelley
