= Griffin Bell =

American judge (1918–2009)

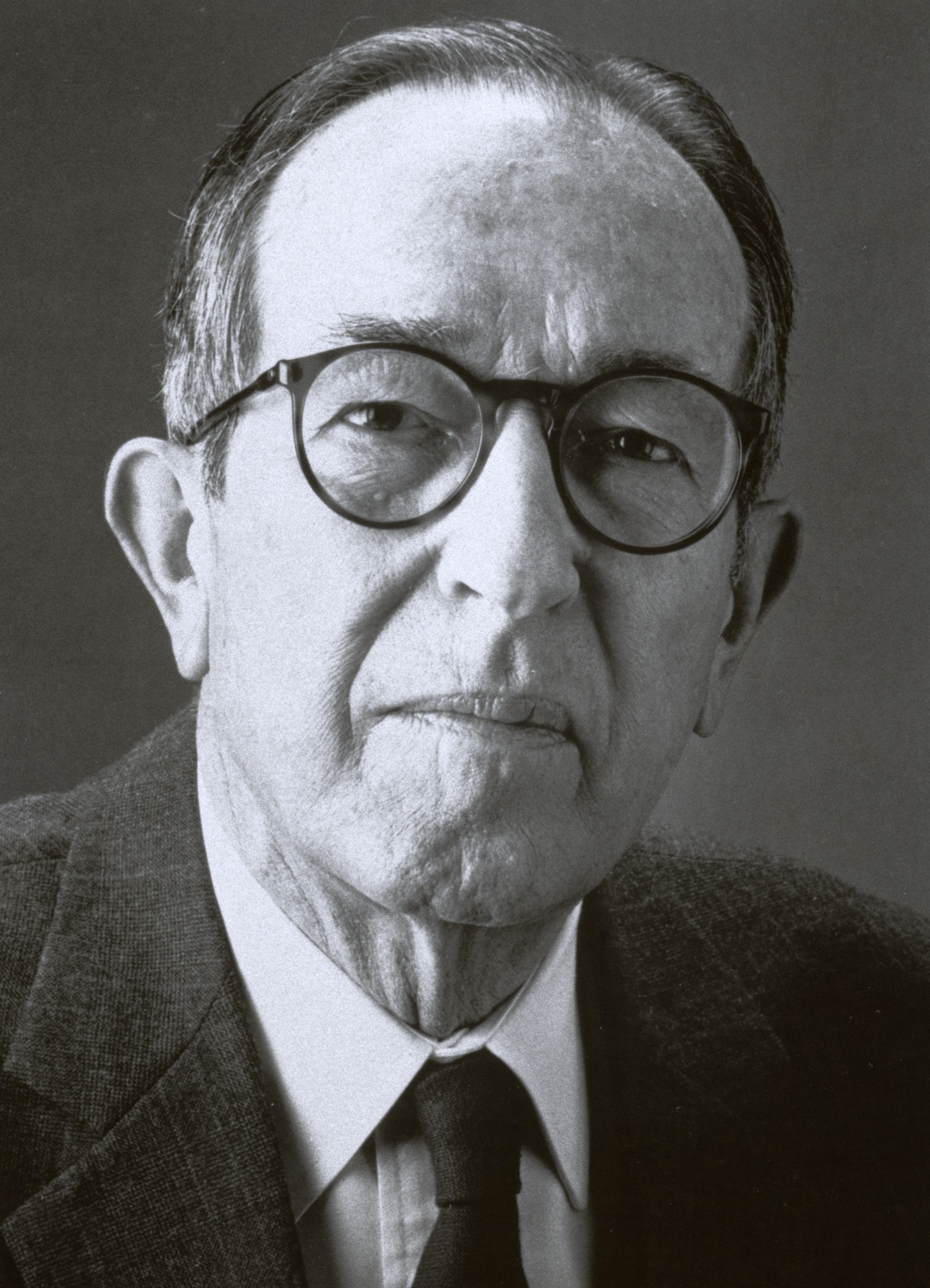
- Bell in 1985

72nd United States Attorney General
- In office January 26, 1977 – August 16, 1979
- President: Jimmy Carter
- Deputy: Peter F. Flaherty; Benjamin Civiletti
- Preceded by: Edward H. Levi
- Succeeded by: Benjamin R. Civiletti

Judge of the United States Court of Appeals for the Fifth Circuit
- In office October 5, 1961 – March 1, 1976
- Appointed by: John F. Kennedy
- Preceded by: Seat established
- Succeeded by: James Clinkscales Hill

Personal details
- Born: Griffin Boyette Bell; October 31, 1918 Americus, Georgia, U.S.
- Died: January 5, 2009 (aged 90) Atlanta, Georgia, U.S.
- Party: Democratic
- Education: Mercer University (LLB)

Military service
- Branch/service: US Army
- Years of service: 1942-1946
- Rank: Major
- Unit: Quartermaster Corps and Transportation Corps

Griffin Boyette Bell (October 31, 1918 – January 5, 2009) was the 72nd Attorney General of the United States, having served under President Jimmy Carter. Previously, he was a U.S. circuit judge of the United States Court of Appeals for the Fifth Circuit.

== Education and career ==
Born on October 31, 1918, in Americus, Georgia. He served in the United States Army from 1942 to 1946 in the Quartermaster Corps and Transportation Corps. He was stationed at Fort Lee, Virginia. He attained the rank of major. After leaving the army, Bell received a Bachelor of Laws in 1948 from Mercer University School of Law. He began his private practice in Savannah from 1948 to 1952, then was in private practice in Rome, Georgia from 1952 to 1953 and finally was in private practice at King & Spalding in Atlanta from 1953 to 1961. He was chief of staff to Governor Ernest Vandiver from 1959 to 1961.

== Federal judicial service ==
Bell received a recess appointment from President John F. Kennedy on October 5, 1961, to the United States Court of Appeals for the Fifth Circuit, to a new seat authorized by 75 Stat. 80. He was nominated to the same position by President Kennedy on January 15, 1962. He was confirmed by the United States Senate on February 5, 1962, and received his commission on February 9, 1962. He served as a board member of the Federal Judicial Center from 1973 to 1976. His service terminated on March 1, 1976, due to his resignation.

=== Role in the 1966 Georgia gubernatorial election ===
In the aftermath of the disputed 1966 Georgia gubernatorial election between Democrat Lester Maddox and Republican Howard "Bo" Callaway, Bell joined Republican Judge Elbert Tuttle in striking down the Georgia constitutional provision requiring that the legislature chose the governor if no general election candidate receives a majority of the vote. The judges concluded that a malapportioned legislature might "dilute" the votes of the candidate with a plurality, in this case Callaway. Bell compared legislative selection to the former county unit system, a kind of electoral college formerly used in Georgia to select the governor but invalidated by the U.S. Supreme Court. Bell and Tuttle granted a temporary suspension of their ruling to permit appeal to the U.S. Supreme Court and stipulated that the state could resolve the deadlock so long as the legislature not make the selection. In a five-to-two decision known as Fortson v. Morris, the high court struck down the Bell-Tuttle legal reasoning and directed the legislature to choose between Maddox and Callaway. Two liberal justices, William O. Douglas and Abe Fortas had argued against legislative selection of the governor, but the court majority, led this time by Hugo Black, took the strict constructionist line and cleared the path for Maddox's ultimate election.

== Attorney General service ==
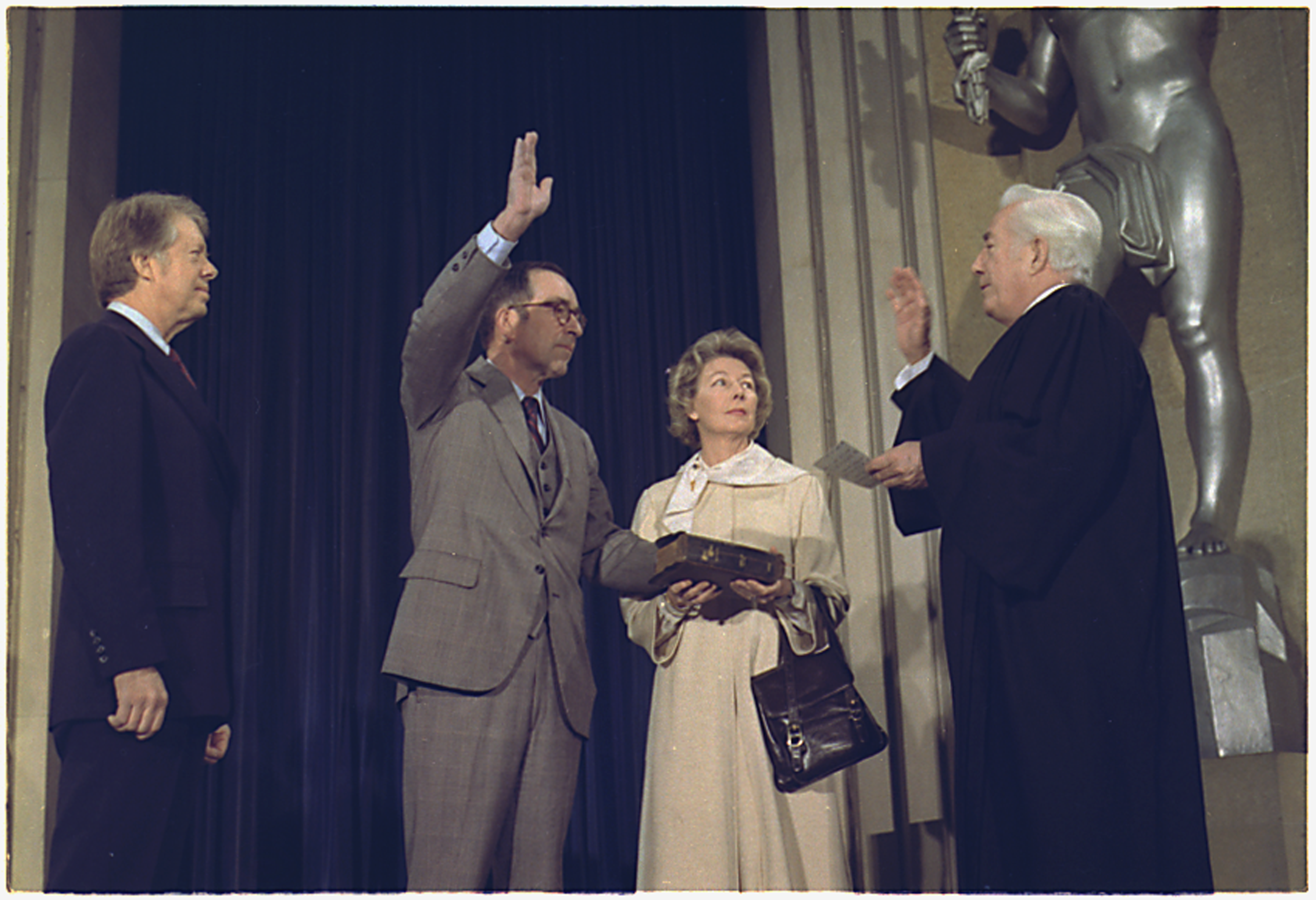
Griffin Bell is sworn in as Attorney General.

Bell briefly returned to private practice in Atlanta in 1976. President Jimmy Carter appointed Bell Attorney General of the United States in 1977, and he served until 1979.

=== Indictment of L. Patrick Gray ===
On April 10, 1978, Attorney General Bell announced the indictment of former acting FBI Director L. Patrick Gray, former FBI Assistant Director Mark Felt, and Felt's deputy, Edward S. Miller, for authorizing break-ins of New York City radical political activists. Bell introduced requirements that any authorized illegal activities must be made in writing. Five Department of Justice attorneys resigned over the alleged reluctance of Attorney General Bell to pursue others in the department for illegal activities related to domestic spying.

=== Resignation ===
Bell resigned on August 16, 1979, to return to private practice in Atlanta.

== Later career ==
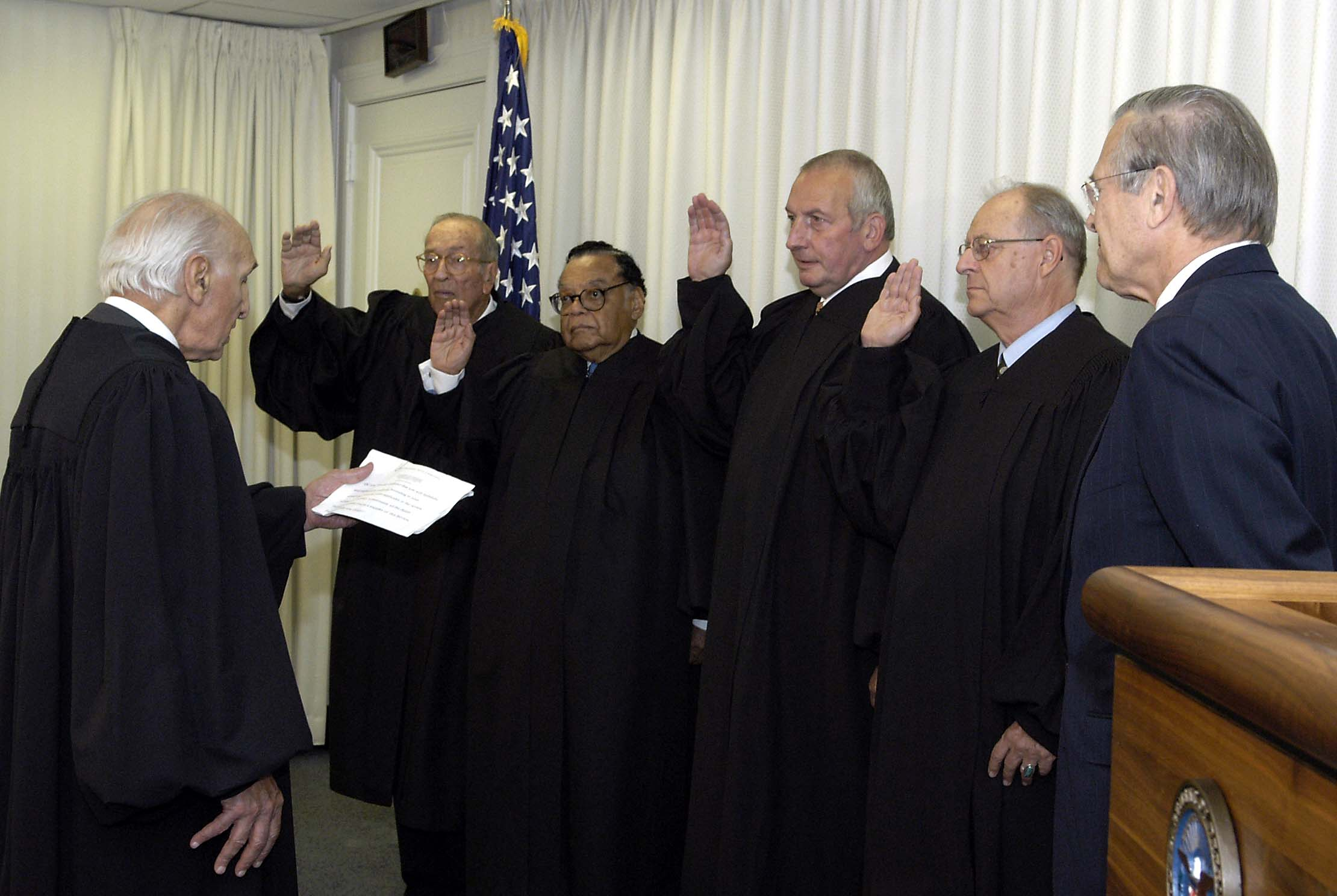
Bell being sworn in on the Court of Military Commission Review. Bell is the second individual from the left.

Bell returned to private practice in Atlanta from 1979 until his death in 2009. In September 2004, Bell was appointed the Chief Judge of the United States Court of Military Commission Review. Bell was replaced by Judge Frank J. Williams in July 2007, when the first two cases were appealed to the Court, due to ill health. He represented Big Tobacco companies during their 1994 hearings.

== Death ==
Griffin Bell died on January 5, 2009, in Atlanta. According to the Associated Press, Bell was being treated for complications from pancreatic cancer and had been suffering from long-term kidney disease. Governor Sonny Perdue ordered the flag of the United States flown at half-staff in the state of Georgia on January 7, 2009, the day of Bell's funeral. He is buried in Americus' Oak Grove Cemetery, Section N3-South, where his tombstone bears the inscription "Citizen Soldier, Trial Lawyer, Federal Appellate Judge, Attorney General of the United States."

== Legacy ==
Bell had a long-standing relationship with the Georgia Historical Society (GHS). He was a member of the institution for over half a century and from 1996 until his death served as honorary chairman of its advisory board. In 2008, Bell donated his papers to GHS, where they are available for research. See the finding aid for the Griffin B. Bell papers at the Georgia Historical Society.

== Honors and awards ==
In December 2008, Bell received an honorary Doctor of Humanities degree from Georgia Southwestern State University in recognition of his achievements and appreciation for his efforts to promote the interests of his alma mater.

== See also ==
- List of United States political appointments that crossed party lines

== Sources ==
- Bell, Griffin B. and Ronald J. Ostrow. Taking Care of the Law. Morrow. 1982. ISBN 978-0-688-01136-9
- Murphy, Reg, "Uncommon Sense, The Achievement of Griffin Bell," Peachtree Press.

Legal offices
Preceded by Seat established by 75 Stat. 80	Judge of the United States Court of Appeals for the Fifth Circuit; 1961–1976	Succeeded by James Clinkscales Hill
Preceded by Edward H. Levi	U.S. Attorney General; Served under: Jimmy Carter; 1977–1979	Succeeded by Benjamin Civiletti
