= Harold Loyd Murphy =

American judge (1927–2022)

Senior Judge of the United States District Court for the Northern District of Georgia
- In office March 31, 2017 – December 28, 2022

Judge of the United States District Court for the Northern District of Georgia
- In office July 29, 1977 – March 31, 2017
- Appointed by: Jimmy Carter
- Preceded by: James Clinkscales Hill
- Succeeded by: William M. Ray II

Judge for the Tallapoosa Judicial Circuit, Georgia
- In office 1971–1977

Member of the Georgia House of Representatives from Haralson County
- In office 1951–1961
- Succeeded by: Thomas B. Murphy

Personal details
- Born: March 31, 1927 Haralson County, Georgia, U.S.
- Died: December 28, 2022 (aged 95)
- Party: Democratic
- Education: University of Georgia School of Law (LLB)

Military service
- Branch/service: United States Navy
- Years of service: 1945–1946

Harold Loyd Murphy (March 31, 1927 – December 28, 2022) was a United States district judge of the United States District Court for the Northern District of Georgia.

== Education and career ==
Born in Haralson County, Georgia, on March 31, 1927, Murphy was in the United States Navy towards the end of World War II, from 1945 to 1946. He received a Bachelor of Laws from the University of Georgia School of Law in 1949, and was then in private practice in Buchanan, Georgia, until 1958, and in Buchanan and Tallapoosa, Georgia, until 1971. He was a Georgia state representative from 1951 to 1961. He was an assistant state solicitor general of the Tallapoosa Judicial Circuit in 1956. He was a Superior Court judge for the Tallapoosa Judicial Circuit, Georgia from 1971 to 1977.

== Federal judicial service ==
On July 7, 1977, Murphy was nominated by President Jimmy Carter to a seat on the United States District Court for the Northern District of Georgia vacated by James Clinkscales Hill. Murphy was confirmed by the United States Senate on July 28, 1977, and received his commission on July 29, 1977. He assumed senior status on March 31, 2017.

== Death and legacy ==
In 2014, the Alabama State University board of trustees voted to name its school of graduate studies after Murphy, in honor of his ruling in the civil rights case Knight v. Alabama. He died on December 28, 2022, at the age of 95.

== See also ==
- List of United States federal judges by longevity of service

== Sources ==
Legal offices
Preceded by James Clinkscales Hill	Judge of the United States District Court for the Northern District of Georgia; 1977–2017	Succeeded by William McCrary Ray II
