= Marvin Herman Shoob =

American judge

Senior Judge of the United States District Court for the Northern District of Georgia
- In office September 30, 1991 – June 12, 2017

Judge of the United States District Court for the Northern District of Georgia
- In office July 24, 1979 – September 30, 1991
- Appointed by: Jimmy Carter
- Preceded by: Seat established by 92 Stat. 1629
- Succeeded by: Frank M. Hull

Personal details
- Born: Marvin Herman Shoob; February 23, 1923 Walterboro, South Carolina
- Died: June 12, 2017 (aged 94) Atlanta, Georgia
- Education: University of Georgia School of Law (JD)

Marvin Herman Shoob (February 23, 1923 – June 12, 2017) was a United States district judge of the United States District Court for the Northern District of Georgia.

== Education and career ==
Born in Walterboro, South Carolina. Shoob was Jewish and served in the United States Army during World War II, from 1942 to 1945, becoming a Sergeant. He received a Juris Doctor from the University of Georgia School of Law in 1948. He was in private practice in Atlanta, Georgia from 1948 to 1979.

== Federal judicial service ==
On June 5, 1979, Shoob was nominated by President Jimmy Carter to a new seat on the United States District Court for the Northern District of Georgia created by 92 Stat. 1629. He was confirmed by the United States Senate on July 23, 1979, and received his commission on July 24, 1979. He assumed senior status on September 30, 1991. He took inactive senior status on February 23, 2016, serving in that capacity until his death on June 12, 2017, at his home in Atlanta, Georgia. His funeral was held at The Temple.

== Sources ==
- FJC Bio

Legal offices
Preceded by Seat established by 92 Stat. 1629	Judge of the United States District Court for the Northern District of Georgia; 1979–1991	Succeeded by Frank M. Hull
