= M. Neil Andrews =

American judge (1894–1967)

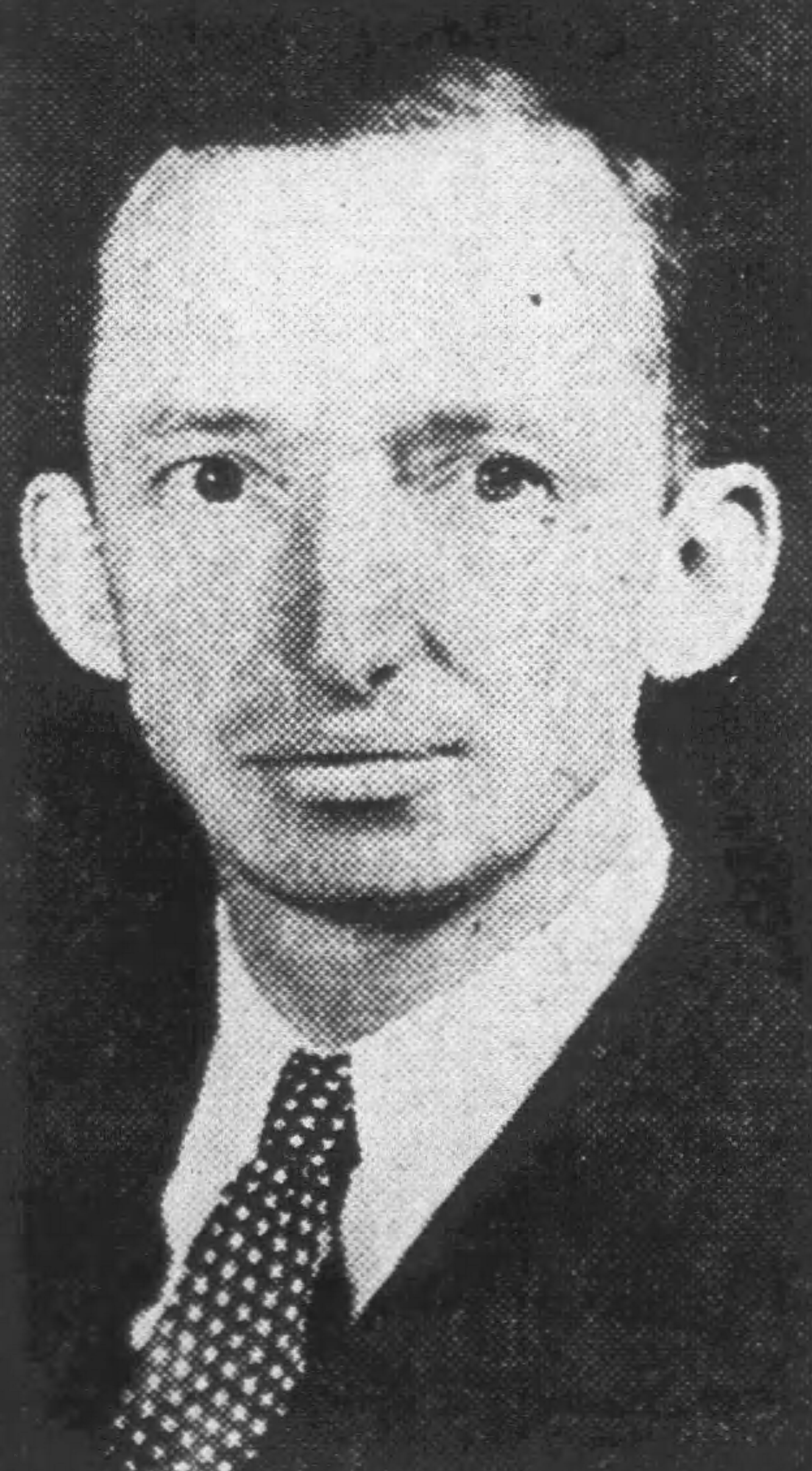

Chief Judge of the United States District Court for the Northern District of Georgia
- In office 1949–1950
- Preceded by: Robert Lee Russell
- Succeeded by: Frank Arthur Hooper

Judge of the United States District Court for the Northern District of Georgia
- In office October 21, 1949 – October 31, 1950
- Appointed by: Harry S. Truman
- Preceded by: Seat established by 63 Stat. 493
- Succeeded by: William Boyd Sloan

Personal details
- Born: Maurice Neil Andrews; December 24, 1894 LaFayette, Georgia, U.S.
- Died: August 31, 1967 (aged 72) Chattanooga, Tennessee, U.S.
- Education: University of Georgia School of Law (LLB)

Maurice Neil Andrews (December 24, 1894 – August 31, 1967) was a United States district judge of the United States District Court for the Northern District of Georgia.

== Education and career ==
Born in LaFayette, Georgia, Andrews received a Bachelor of Laws from the University of Georgia School of Law in 1916. He was in the United States Army as a Lieutenant from 1917 to 1919. He was in the United States Army Reserves as a Captain in the JAG Corps from 1925 to 1935. He was in private practice of law in LaFayette from 1916 to 1925. He was an Assistant Solicitor General of the Rome Circuit from 1925 to 1929, and Solicitor General of that circuit from 1929 to 1932. He was an Assistant United States Attorney of the Northern District of Georgia from 1934 to 1938. He was special assistant to the Attorney General of the United States for the Antitrust Division of the United States Department of Justice from 1940 to 1942. He was Chief of the Trial Section of the Criminal Division of the United States Department of Justice from 1940 to 1942. He was the United States Attorney for the Northern District of Georgia from 1942 to 1946. He was a staff member for Justice Robert H. Jackson during prosecution of the Nuremberg Trials.

== Federal judicial service ==
Andrews received a recess appointment from President Harry S. Truman on October 21, 1949, to the United States District Court for the Northern District of Georgia, to a new seat created by 63 Stat. 493. He was nominated to the same seat by President Truman on January 5, 1950. He served as Chief Judge from 1949 to 1950. His nomination was rejected by the United States Senate on August 9, 1950. His service was terminated on October 31, 1950, due to his resignation. He would otherwise have been eligible to continue serving until the sine die adjournment of the 81st United States Congress on January 2, 1951.

== Death ==
Andrews died on August 31, 1967, in Chattanooga, Tennessee.

== Sources ==
- "Andrews, Maurice Neil - Federal Judicial Center". www.fjc.gov.

Legal offices
Preceded by Seat established by 63 Stat. 493	Judge of the United States District Court for the Northern District of Georgia; 1949–1950	Succeeded by William Boyd Sloan
Preceded by Robert Lee Russell	Chief Judge of the United States District Court for the Northern District of Georgia; 1949–1950	Succeeded by Frank Arthur Hooper
