= J. Owen Forrester =

American judge (1939–2014

Senior Judge of the United States District Court for the Northern District of Georgia
- In office April 27, 2004 – July 1, 2014

Judge of the United States District Court for the Northern District of Georgia
- In office December 10, 1981 – April 27, 2004
- Appointed by: Ronald Reagan
- Preceded by: Newell Edenfield
- Succeeded by: William S. Duffey Jr.

Magistrate Judge of the United States District Court for the Northern District of Georgia
- In office 1976–1981

Personal details
- Born: Julian Owen Forrester; April 27, 1939 Columbus, Georgia, U.S.
- Died: July 1, 2014 (aged 75) Atlanta, Georgia, U.S.
- Education: Georgia Institute of Technology (BS); Emory University (LLB)

Julian Owen Forrester (April 27, 1939 – July 1, 2014) was a United States district judge of the United States District Court for the Northern District of Georgia.

== Education and early career ==
Born in Columbus, Georgia, Forrester received a Bachelor of Science degree from Georgia Institute of Technology in 1961 and a Bachelor of Laws from Emory University School of Law in 1966. He was staff attorney for the Callaway for Governor Committee in Georgia from 1966 to 1967. He was in private practice in Atlanta, Georgia from 1967 to 1969, and was then an assistant United States attorney for the Northern District of Georgia until 1976.

== Federal judicial service ==
Forrester served as a United States magistrate judge for the Northern District of Georgia from 1976 to 1981. On November 24, 1981, he was nominated by President Ronald Reagan to a seat on the United States District Court for the Northern District of Georgia vacated by Judge Newell Edenfield. Forrester was confirmed by the United States Senate on December 9, 1981, and received his commission the following day. He assumed senior status on April 27, 2004, serving in that status until his death on July 1, 2014, in Atlanta.

Legal offices
| Preceded by Newell Edenfield | Judge of the United States District Court for the Northern District of Georgia; 1981–2004 | Succeeded by William S. Duffey Jr. |
