= Frank M. Hull =

American judge (born 1948)

Frank Hull
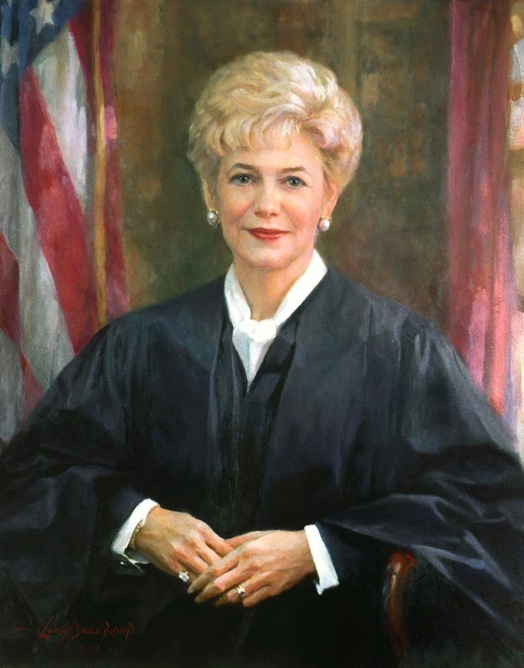

Senior Judge of the United States Court of Appeals for the Eleventh Circuit
- Incumbent
- Assumed office December 31, 2017

Judge of the United States Court of Appeals for the Eleventh Circuit
- In office September 18, 1997 – December 31, 2017
- Appointed by: Bill Clinton
- Preceded by: Phyllis A. Kravitch
- Succeeded by: Elizabeth L. Branch

Judge of the United States District Court for the Northern District of Georgia
- In office May 9, 1994 – October 2, 1997
- Appointed by: Bill Clinton
- Preceded by: Marvin Herman Shoob
- Succeeded by: Charles A. Pannell Jr.

Personal details
- Born: Frank Mays Hull; December 9, 1948 (age 77) Augusta, Georgia, U.S.
- Spouse: Tony Aeck
- Education: Randolph College (BA); Emory University (JD)

Frank Mays Hull (born December 9, 1948) is a senior United States circuit judge of the United States Court of Appeals for the Eleventh Circuit.

== Education ==
Hull graduated from the Academy of Richmond County in 1966, and received her Bachelor of Arts degree from Randolph-Macon Woman's College (now Randolph College) in 1970. She received her Juris Doctor from Emory University School of Law in 1973. She graduated cum laude, Order of the Coif, and was on the Law Review.

== Legal career ==
Hull was a law clerk to Judge Elbert P. Tuttle of the United States Court of Appeals for the Fifth Circuit from 1973 to 1974. She was an associate attorney with the law firm Powell, Goldstein, Frazer & Murphy, in Atlanta, Georgia from 1974 to 1980 and a partner there from 1980 to 1984. She served as a Judge for the State Court of Fulton County, Georgia from 1984 to 1990, as a Judge for the Superior Court of Fulton County, Georgia from 1990 to 1994.

== Federal judicial service ==
Hull was nominated by Bill Clinton on February 9, 1994, to a seat on the United States District Court for the Northern District of Georgia vacated by Marvin Herman Shoob. She was confirmed by the Senate on May 6, 1994, and received commission on May 9, 1994. Her service terminated on October 2, 1997, due to her elevation to the court of appeals.

She was nominated by President Bill Clinton on June 18, 1997, for the United States Court of Appeals for the Eleventh Circuit to a seat vacated by Phyllis A. Kravitch, who assumed senior status. She was confirmed by the United States Senate by a 96–0 vote on September 4, 1997. She received her commission on September 18, 1997. She assumed senior status on December 31, 2017.

Legal offices
Preceded by Marvin Herman Shoob	Judge of the United States District Court for the Northern District of Georgia; 1994–1997	Succeeded by Charles A. Pannell Jr.
Preceded by Phyllis A. Kravitch	Judge of the United States Court of Appeals for the Eleventh Circuit; 1997–2017	Succeeded by Elizabeth L. Branch
