= James Clinkscales Hill =

American judge (1924–2017)

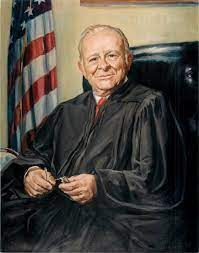
- Hill's court portrait

Senior Judge of the United States Court of Appeals for the Eleventh Circuit
- In office October 15, 1989 – March 31, 2017

Judge of the United States Court of Appeals for the Eleventh Circuit
- In office October 1, 1981 – October 15, 1989
- Appointed by: operation of law
- Preceded by: Seat established by 94 Stat. 1994
- Succeeded by: Stanley F. Birch Jr.

Judge of the United States Court of Appeals for the Fifth Circuit
- In office May 21, 1976 – October 1, 1981
- Appointed by: Gerald Ford
- Preceded by: Griffin Bell
- Succeeded by: Seat abolished

Judge of the United States District Court for the Northern District of Georgia
- In office August 9, 1974 – May 26, 1976
- Appointed by: Richard Nixon
- Preceded by: Sidney Oslin Smith Jr.
- Succeeded by: Harold Lloyd Murphy

Personal details
- Born: James Clinkscales Hill; January 8, 1924 Darlington, South Carolina, U.S.
- Died: March 31, 2017 (aged 93) Stuart, Florida, U.S.
- Children: James Hill
- Education: University of South Carolina (BSc); Emory University School of Law (JD)

James Clinkscales Hill (January 8, 1924 – March 31, 2017) was a United States circuit judge of the United States Court of Appeals for the Fifth Circuit and of the United States Court of Appeals for the Eleventh Circuit and previously was a United States district judge of the United States District Court for the Northern District of Georgia.

== Education and career ==
Born in Darlington, South Carolina, Hill was in the United States Army Air Corps during World War II, from 1943 to 1945. He received a Juris Doctor from Emory University School of Law in 1948 and a Bachelor of Science degree from the University of South Carolina in 1948. He was in private practice in Atlanta, Georgia from 1948 to 1974.

== Federal judicial service ==
Hill was nominated by President Richard Nixon on July 9, 1974, to a seat on the United States District Court for the Northern District of Georgia vacated by Judge Sidney Oslin Smith Jr. He was confirmed by the United States Senate on August 8, 1974, and received his commission on August 9, 1974. His service was terminated on May 26, 1976, due to elevation to the Fifth Circuit.

Hill was nominated by President Gerald Ford on May 4, 1976, to a seat on the United States Court of Appeals for the Fifth Circuit vacated by Judge Griffin Bell. He was confirmed by the Senate on May 19, 1976, and received his commission on May 21, 1976. Hill was reassigned by operation of law to the United States Court of Appeals for the Eleventh Circuit on October 1, 1981. He assumed senior status on October 15, 1989, serving in that status until his death on March 31, 2017, in Stuart, Florida.

== Sources ==
Legal offices
| Preceded by Sidney Oslin Smith Jr. | Judge of the United States District Court for the Northern District of Georgia; 1974–1976 | Succeeded by Harold Lloyd Murphy |
| Preceded by Griffin Bell | Judge of the United States Court of Appeals for the Fifth Circuit; 1976–1981 | Succeeded by Seat abolished |
| Preceded by Seat established by 94 Stat. 1994 | Judge of the United States Court of Appeals for the Eleventh Circuit; 1981–1989 | Succeeded by Stanley F. Birch Jr. |
