= Albert John Henderson =

American judge (1920–1999)

Senior Judge of the United States Court of Appeals for the Eleventh Circuit
- In office January 31, 1986 – May 11, 1999

Judge of the United States Court of Appeals for the Eleventh Circuit
- In office October 1, 1981 – January 31, 1986
- Appointed by: operation of law
- Preceded by: Seat established
- Succeeded by: James Larry Edmondson

Judge of the United States Court of Appeals for the Fifth Circuit
- In office July 13, 1979 – October 1, 1981
- Appointed by: Jimmy Carter
- Preceded by: Seat established by 92 Stat. 1629
- Succeeded by: Seat abolished

Chief Judge of the United States District Court for the Northern District of Georgia
- In office 1976–1979
- Preceded by: Newell Edenfield
- Succeeded by: Charles Allen Moye Jr.

Judge of the United States District Court for the Northern District of Georgia
- In office October 11, 1968 – July 26, 1979
- Appointed by: Lyndon B. Johnson
- Preceded by: Lewis Render Morgan
- Succeeded by: Orinda Dale Evans

Personal details
- Born: Albert John Henderson; December 12, 1920 Canton, Georgia, U.S.
- Died: May 11, 1999 (aged 78) Marietta, Georgia, U.S.
- Education: Mercer University (LLB)

Albert John Henderson (December 12, 1920 – May 11, 1999) was a United States circuit judge of the United States Court of Appeals for the Fifth Circuit and the United States Court of Appeals for the Eleventh Circuit and earlier was a United States district judge of the United States District Court for the Northern District of Georgia.

== Education and career ==
Born in Canton, Georgia, Henderson was a Sergeant in the United States Army from 1943 to 1945, and then received a Bachelor of Laws from the Walter F. George School of Law at Mercer University in 1947. He was an underwriter for Lawyers Title Insurance Company in Atlanta, Georgia from 1947 to 1948, and was in private practice in Marietta, Georgia from 1948 to 1960. He was a trial attorney of the Assistant State Solicitor General's Office of the Blue Ridge Judicial Circuit from 1949 to 1952. He was a judge of the Juvenile Court of Cobb County, Georgia from 1953 to 1960, and then on the Superior Court of Cobb County from 1961 to 1968.

== Federal judicial service ==
On September 25, 1968, Henderson was nominated by President Lyndon B. Johnson to a seat on the United States District Court for the Northern District of Georgia vacated by Judge Lewis Render Morgan. Henderson was confirmed by the United States Senate on October 10, 1968, and received his commission on October 11, 1968. He served as Chief Judge from 1976 to 1979. His service terminated on July 26, 1979, due to his elevation to the Fifth Circuit.

On April 18, 1979, President Jimmy Carter nominated Henderson to a new seat on the United States Court of Appeals for the Fifth Circuit created by 92 Stat. 1629. He was confirmed by the Senate on July 12, 1979, receiving his commission the following day. On October 1, 1981, Henderson was reassigned by operation of law to the United States Court of Appeals for the Eleventh Circuit. He assumed senior status on January 31, 1986, serving in that capacity until his death, in Marietta.

Legal offices
Preceded by Lewis Render Morgan	Judge of the United States District Court for the Northern District of Georgia; 1968–1979	Succeeded by Orinda Dale Evans
Preceded by Newell Edenfield	Chief Judge of the United States District Court for the Northern District of Georgia; 1976–1979	Succeeded by Charles Allen Moye Jr.
Preceded by Seat established by 92 Stat. 1629	Judge of the United States Court of Appeals for the Fifth Circuit; 1979–1981	Succeeded by Seat abolished
Preceded by Seat established	Judge of the United States Court of Appeals for the Eleventh Circuit; 1981–1986	Succeeded by James Larry Edmondson
