= Phyllis A. Kravitch =

American judge (1920–2017)

Phyllis Adele Kravitch

Senior Judge of the United States Court of Appeals for the Eleventh Circuit
- In office December 31, 1996 – June 15, 2017

Judge of the United States Court of Appeals for the Eleventh Circuit
- In office October 1, 1981 – December 31, 1996
- Appointed by: operation of law
- Preceded by: Seat established
- Succeeded by: Frank M. Hull

Judge of the United States Court of Appeals for the Fifth Circuit
- In office March 23, 1979 – October 1, 1981
- Appointed by: Jimmy Carter
- Preceded by: Lewis Render Morgan
- Succeeded by: Seat abolished

Personal details
- Born: Phyllis Adele Kravitch; August 23, 1920 Savannah, Georgia
- Died: June 15, 2017 (aged 96) Atlanta, Georgia
- Education: Armstrong State University (AA); Goucher College (BA); University of Pennsylvania Law School (LLB)

Phyllis Adele Kravitch (August 23, 1920 – June 15, 2017) was a United States circuit judge of the United States Court of Appeals for the Fifth Circuit and later the United States Court of Appeals for the Eleventh Circuit in Atlanta, Georgia.

== Education and career ==
Kravitch was born in Savannah, Georgia, one of four daughters of Aaron Kravitch, an attorney, and Ella B. Wiseman, and was Jewish. She attended Armstrong Junior College in Savannah receiving an Associate of Arts degree in 1939. She later obtained her Bachelor of Arts degree from Goucher College in 1941. She graduated with a Bachelor of Laws from the University of Pennsylvania Law School in 1943, her father Aaron's alma mater (Law 1917). At the University of Pennsylvania she served on the Law Review Board of Editors. She was in private practice from 1944 to 1976 and then served from 1977 to 1979 as a judge of the Superior Court of the Eastern Judicial Circuit of Georgia.

== Federal judicial service ==
Kravitch was nominated by President Jimmy Carter on January 19, 1979, to a seat on the United States Court of Appeals for the Fifth Circuit vacated by Judge Lewis Render Morgan. She was confirmed by the United States Senate on March 21, 1979, and received her commission on March 23, 1979, becoming the third woman to serve as a United States Circuit Judge. Her service terminated on October 1, 1981, due to reassignment.

Kravitch was reassigned by operation of law on October 1, 1981, to the United States Court of Appeals for the Eleventh Circuit, to a new seat authorized by 94 Stat. 1994. She assumed senior status on December 31, 1996. Her service terminated on June 15, 2017, due to her death at the Piedmont Hospital in Atlanta.

== Feeder judge ==
Four of Kravitch's law clerks went on to clerk at the United States Supreme Court, including Steven L. Chanenson, Beth Brinkmann, Joseph L. Hoffmann and Paul H. Schwartz.

== Later years and death ==
Kravitch assumed senior status on December 31, 1996. On June 15, 2017, Kravitch died at the age of 96 at Piedmont Hospital in Atlanta.

== See also ==
- List of Jewish American jurists

Legal offices
Preceded by Lewis Render Morgan	Judge of the United States Court of Appeals for the Fifth Circuit; 1979–1981	Succeeded by Seat abolished
Preceded by Seat established	Judge of the United States Court of Appeals for the Eleventh Circuit; 1981–1996	Succeeded by Frank M. Hull
