= George Ernest Tidwell =

American judge

Senior Judge of the United States District Court for the Northern District of Georgia
- In office October 8, 1999 – August 4, 2011

Chief Judge of the United States District Court for the Northern District of Georgia
- In office 1996–1999
- Preceded by: Robert L. Vining Jr.
- Succeeded by: Orinda Dale Evans

Judge of the United States District Court for the Northern District of Georgia
- In office July 24, 1979 – October 8, 1999
- Appointed by: Jimmy Carter
- Preceded by: Seat established by 92 Stat. 1629
- Succeeded by: Beverly B. Martin

Personal details
- Born: George Ernest Tidwell; August 1, 1931 Atlanta, Georgia, U.S.
- Died: August 4, 2011 (aged 80) Hilton Head Island, South Carolina, U.S.
- Education: Emory University School of Law (LLB)

George Ernest Tidwell (August 1, 1931 – August 4, 2011) was a United States district judge of the United States District Court for the Northern District of Georgia.

== Education and career ==
Born in Atlanta, Georgia, Tidwell graduated from the Henry W. Grady High School in Atlanta and then received a Bachelor of Laws from Emory University School of Law in 1954. He was in private practice in Atlanta from 1954 to 1966. He was a legal aide to the House Floor Leader of the Georgia General Assembly from 1964 to 1966. He was an associate general counsel of the State Bar of Georgia from 1965 to 1966. He was an executive assistant attorney general of the State of Georgia from 1966 to 1968. He was a judge of the Civil Court of Fulton County, Georgia from 1968 to 1971. He was a judge of the Superior Court for the Atlanta Judicial Circuit from 1971 to 1979.

== Federal judicial service ==
Tidwell was nominated by President Jimmy Carter on June 5, 1979, to the United States District Court for the Northern District of Georgia, to a new seat created by 92 Stat. 1629. He was confirmed by the United States Senate on July 23, 1979, and received his commission on July 24, 1979. He served as Chief Judge from 1996 to 1999. He assumed senior status on October 8, 1999, serving in that status until his death on August 4, 2011, in Hilton Head Island, South Carolina, while on a family reunion vacation. Tidwell was a resident of Atlanta for his entire life and is interred in Atlanta.

== Sources ==
Legal offices
Preceded by Seat established by 92 Stat. 1629	Judge of the United States District Court for the Northern District of Georgia; 1979–1999	Succeeded by Beverly B. Martin
Preceded by Robert L. Vining Jr.	Chief Judge of the United States District Court for the Northern District of Georgia; 1996–1999	Succeeded by Orinda Dale Evans
