= Steven D. Grimberg =

American judge (born 1974)

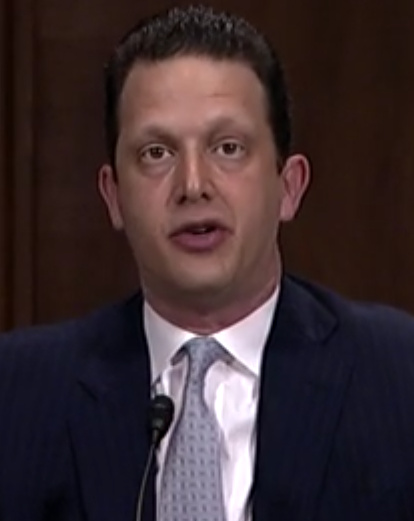

Judge of the United States District Court for the Northern District of Georgia
- Incumbent
- Assumed office September 13, 2019
- Appointed by: Donald Trump
- Preceded by: Richard W. Story

Personal details
- Born: Steven Daniel Grimberg; 1974 (age 51–52) New York City, U.S.
- Education: University of Florida (BA); Emory University (JD)

Steven Daniel Grimberg (born 1974) is a United States district judge of the United States District Court for the Northern District of Georgia.

== Education ==
Grimberg earned his Bachelor of Arts, with honors, from the University of Florida, and his Juris Doctor, with distinction, from Emory University School of Law.

== Legal and academic career ==
He prosecuted white collar criminals as an Assistant United States Attorney and Deputy Chief of the Economic Crimes Section in the United States Attorney's Office for the Northern District of Georgia and as a Trial Attorney in the United States Department of Justice Tax Division. From 2018 to 2019 he served as the managing director and General Counsel of Nardello & Co., where he headed the global investigation firm's Atlanta, Georgia, office. Grimberg is an adjunct professor at Emory University School of Law, where he teaches courses on criminal procedure, criminal law, and trial advocacy.

== Federal judicial service ==
On April 2, 2019, President Donald Trump announced his intent to nominate Grimberg to serve as a United States district judge for the United States District Court for the Northern District of Georgia. On April 4, 2019, his nomination was sent to the Senate. President Trump nominated Grimberg to the seat vacated by Judge Richard W. Story, who assumed senior status on December 1, 2018. On April 30, 2019, a hearing on his nomination was held before the Senate Judiciary Committee. On June 13, 2019, his nomination was reported out of committee by a 17–5 vote. On July 30, 2019, the United States Senate invoked cloture on his nomination by a 72–16 vote. On September 11, 2019, his nomination was confirmed by a 75–18 vote. He received his judicial commission on September 13, 2019.

=== Notable rulings ===
On November 19, 2020, Grimberg threw out a lawsuit brought by a Trump supporter concerning the 2020 U.S. presidential election. Grimberg found that the plaintiff asserting fraud and improprieties in the election lacked standing to sue, waited too long after the election to file their case, and otherwise demonstrated "no basis in fact or in law" for blocking certification of Joe Biden's narrow victory over Trump in Georgia. On August 5, 2022, Grimberg ruled that holding statewide elections for a Georgia utility regulatory body discriminates against Black voters and delayed the elections scheduled for November to a later date.

== Memberships ==
He has been a member of the Federalist Society from 1997 to 2004 and again since 2015. He was a member of the Republican Jewish Coalition from 2015 to 2016.

== See also ==
- List of Hispanic and Latino American jurists
- List of Jewish American jurists

Legal offices
Preceded by Richard W. Story	Judge of the United States District Court for the Northern District of Georgia; 2019–present	Incumbent
