= William Boyd Sloan =

American judge

Senior Judge of the United States District Court for the Northern District of Georgia
- In office August 1, 1965 – October 22, 1970

Judge of the United States District Court for the Northern District of Georgia
- In office March 23, 1951 – August 1, 1965
- Appointed by: Harry S. Truman
- Preceded by: M. Neil Andrews
- Succeeded by: Sidney Oslin Smith Jr.

Personal details
- Born: William Boyd Sloan; July 9, 1895 Gainesville, Georgia, U.S.
- Died: October 22, 1970 (aged 75)
- Education: read law

William Boyd Sloan (July 9, 1895 – October 22, 1970) was a United States district judge of the United States District Court for the Northern District of Georgia.

== Education and career ==
Born in Gainesville, Georgia, Sloan read law to enter the bar in 1915. He was in private practice from 1915 to 1951. He was a member of the Georgia House of Representatives from 1927 to 1931. He was an assistant attorney general of the State of Georgia from 1932 to 1933. He was a Judge of the City Court of Hall County, Georgia from 1934 to 1945, and then of the Superior Court of Georgia for the Northeast Judicial Circuit, from 1945 to 1948.

== Federal judicial service ==
On February 19, 1951, Sloan was nominated by President Harry S. Truman to a seat on the United States District Court for the Northern District of Georgia vacated by Judge M. Neil Andrews. Sloan was confirmed by the United States Senate on March 20, 1951, and received his commission on March 23, 1951. He assumed senior status on August 1, 1965, serving in that capacity until his death on October 22, 1970.

== Sources ==
Legal offices
Preceded by M. Neil Andrews	Judge of the United States District Court for the Northern District of Georgia; 1951–1965	Succeeded by Sidney Oslin Smith Jr.
