= Tiffany R. Johnson =

American judge (born 1986)

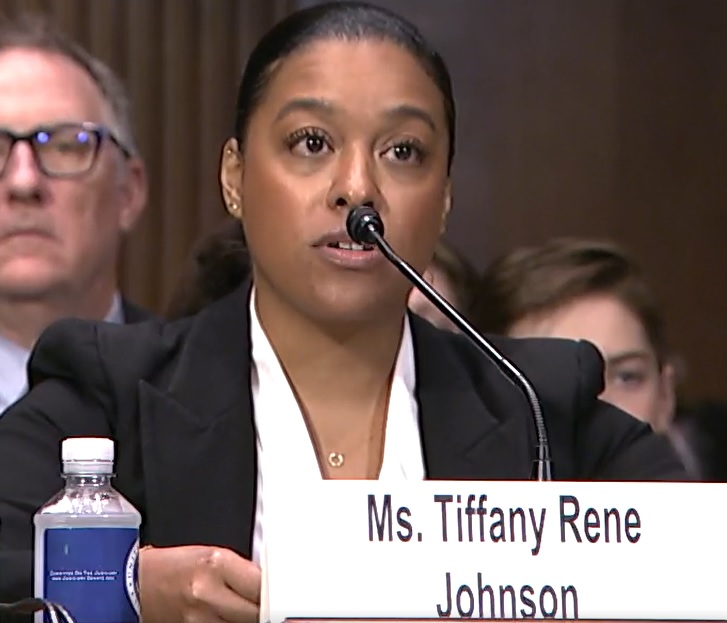

Judge of the United States District Court for the Northern District of Georgia
- Incumbent
- Assumed office January 2, 2025
- Appointed by: Joe Biden
- Preceded by: Steve C. Jones

Personal details
- Born: Tiffany Rene Johnson; 1986 (age 39–40) Nürnberg, West Germany
- Education: Princeton University (BA); Wake Forest University (JD)

Tiffany Rene Johnson (born 1986) is an American lawyer who serves as a United States district judge of the United States District Court for the Northern District of Georgia.

== Education ==
Johnson received a Bachelor of Arts, magna cum laude, from Princeton University in 2009 and a Juris Doctor from Wake Forest University School of Law in 2012.

== Career ==
From 2012 to 2017, Johnson worked as a litigation associate at the Atlanta law firm of Parker, Hudson, Rainer & Dobbs, LLP. From 2017 to 2025, she served as an assistant United States attorney in the U.S. Attorney's Office for the Northern District of Georgia; she served in the office's civil division until 2020, when she was transferred to its criminal division.

=== Federal judicial service ===
On July 31, 2024, President Joe Biden nominated Johnson to serve as a United States district judge of the United States District Court for the Northern District of Georgia. President Biden nominated Johnson to the seat being vacated by Judge Steve C. Jones, who subsequently assumed senior status on January 1, 2025. Johnson, age 37 at the time of her nomination, was one of the youngest people to be nominated to the federal judiciary by Biden. On September 25, 2024, a hearing on her nomination was held before the Senate Judiciary Committee. On November 21, 2024, her nomination was reported out of committee by an 11–10 party-line vote. On December 5, 2024, the United States Senate invoked cloture on her nomination by a 50–45 vote. On December 9, 2024, her nomination was confirmed by a 48–44 vote. She received her judicial commission on January 2, 2025.

== See also ==
- List of African American jurists
- List of African American federal judges

Legal offices
Preceded by Steve C. Jones	Judge of the United States District Court for the Northern District of Georgia; 2025–present	Incumbent
