= Frank Arthur Hooper =

American judge (1895–1985)

Senior Judge of the United States District Court for the Northern District of Georgia
- In office June 29, 1967 – February 11, 1985

Chief Judge of the United States District Court for the Northern District of Georgia
- In office 1950–1965
- Preceded by: M. Neil Andrews
- Succeeded by: Lewis Render Morgan

Judge of the United States District Court for the Northern District of Georgia
- In office October 21, 1949 – June 29, 1967
- Appointed by: Harry S. Truman
- Preceded by: Robert Lee Russell
- Succeeded by: Newell Edenfield

Personal details
- Born: Frank Arthur Hooper; April 21, 1895 Americus, Georgia, U.S.
- Died: February 11, 1985 (aged 89) Atlanta, Georgia, U.S.
- Education: Georgia Institute of Technology; Atlanta Law School (LL.B., LL.M.) read law

Frank Arthur Hooper (April 21, 1895 – February 11, 1985) was a United States district judge of the United States District Court for the Northern District of Georgia.

== Education and career ==
Born in Americus, Georgia, Hooper attended Henry W. Grady High School (then Boys High School) in Atlanta, Georgia. He attended the George School of Technology (now the Georgia Institute of Technology) and then received a Bachelor of Laws and a Master of Laws from Atlanta Law School. He read law in 1916. He was a law clerk for Judge Walter F. George of the Georgia Court of Appeals from 1917 to 1919. He was a United States Naval Reserve Lieutenant in 1919. He was in private practice of law in Atlanta from 1919 to 1943. He was a member of the Georgia House of Representatives from 1925 to 1928. He was a Judge of the Georgia Court of Appeals in 1933. He was an instructor at Atlanta Law School from 1934 to 1943. He was an assistant city attorney of Atlanta from 1940 to 1943. He was a Judge of the Superior Court of Georgia for the Atlanta Judicial Circuit from 1943 to 1949. He served as president of the Georgia Tech Alumni Association from 1945 to 1947.

== Federal judicial service ==
Hooper received a recess appointment from President Harry S. Truman on October 21, 1949, to a seat on the United States District Court for the Northern District of Georgia vacated by Judge Robert Lee Russell. He was nominated to the same seat by President Truman on January 5, 1950. He was confirmed by the United States Senate on February 21, 1950, and received his commission on February 23, 1950. He served as Chief Judge from 1950 to 1965. He assumed senior status on June 29, 1967. His service was terminated on February 11, 1985, due to his death in Atlanta.

== Sources ==
Legal offices
Preceded by Robert Lee Russell	Judge of the United States District Court for the Northern District of Georgia; 1949–1967	Succeeded by Newell Edenfield
Preceded by M. Neil Andrews	Chief Judge of the United States District Court for the Northern District of Georgia; 1950–1965	Succeeded by Lewis Render Morgan
