= William Clark O'Kelley =

American judge (1930–2017)

Senior Judge of the United States District Court for the Northern District of Georgia
- In office October 1, 1996 – July 5, 2017

Chief Judge of the United States District Court for the Northern District of Georgia
- In office 1988–1994
- Preceded by: Charles Allen Moye Jr.
- Succeeded by: Robert L. Vining Jr.

Judge of the United States District Court for the Northern District of Georgia
- In office October 16, 1970 – October 1, 1996
- Appointed by: Richard Nixon
- Preceded by: Seat established by 84 Stat. 294
- Succeeded by: Richard W. Story

Personal details
- Born: January 2, 1930 Atlanta, Georgia, U.S.
- Died: July 5, 2017 (aged 87)
- Education: Emory University (AB, LLB)

William Clark O'Kelley (January 2, 1930 – July 5, 2017) was a United States district judge of the United States District Court for the Northern District of Georgia.

== Education and career ==
Born in Atlanta, Georgia, O'Kelley received an Artium Baccalaureus degree from Emory University in 1951 and a Bachelor of Laws from Emory University School of Law in 1953. He was in the United States Air Force from 1953 to 1957, thereafter remaining in the United States Air Force Reserve until 1966. He was in private practice in Atlanta from 1957 to 1959, and was an Assistant United States Attorney of the Northern District of Georgia from 1959 to 1961, returning to private practice in Atlanta until 1970. He was also a special hearing officer for the United States Department of Justice from 1962 to 1968.

=== Federal judicial service ===
On October 7, 1970, O'Kelley was nominated by President Richard Nixon to a new seat on the United States District Court for the Northern District of Georgia created by 84 Stat. 294. He was confirmed by the United States Senate on October 13, 1970, and received his commission on October 16, 1970. He was assigned as a judge of the United States Foreign Intelligence Surveillance Court from 1980 to 1987, and was Chief Judge of the Northern District of Georgia from 1988 to 1994. He assumed senior status on October 1, 1996, serving in that status until his death of cancer on July 5, 2017.

== See also ==
- List of United States federal judges by longevity of service

Legal offices
Preceded by Seat established by 84 Stat. 294	Judge of the United States District Court for the Northern District of Georgia; 1970–1996	Succeeded by Richard W. Story
Preceded by Charles Allen Moye Jr.	Chief Judge of the United States District Court for the Northern District of Georgia; 1988–1994	Succeeded by Robert L. Vining Jr.
