= Orinda Dale Evans =

American judge (born 1943)

Senior Judge of the United States District Court for the Northern District of Georgia
- Incumbent
- Assumed office December 31, 2008

Chief Judge of the United States District Court for the Northern District of Georgia
- In office 1999–2006
- Preceded by: George Ernest Tidwell
- Succeeded by: Jack Tarpley Camp Jr.

Judge of the United States District Court for the Northern District of Georgia
- In office July 24, 1979 – December 31, 2008
- Appointed by: Jimmy Carter
- Preceded by: Albert John Henderson
- Succeeded by: Steve C. Jones

Personal details
- Born: April 23, 1943 (age 82) Savannah, Georgia, U.S.
- Spouse: Roberts O. Bennett
- Education: Duke University (AB); Emory University (JD)

Orinda Dale Evans (born April 23, 1943) is an inactive senior United States district judge of the United States District Court for the Northern District of Georgia.

== Early life and education ==
Evans was born in Savannah, Georgia. She received an Artium Baccalaureus degree from Duke University in 1965 and a Juris Doctor from Emory University School of Law in 1968.

== Career ==
She was in private practice in Atlanta, Georgia from 1968 to 1979. She served as counsel to the Atlanta Crime Commission from 1970 to 1971, and was an adjunct professor of law at Emory from 1974 to 1977.

=== Federal judicial service ===
On June 5, 1979, Evans was nominated by President Jimmy Carter to a seat on the United States District Court for the Northern District of Georgia vacated by Judge Albert John Henderson. She was confirmed by the United States Senate on July 23, 1979, and received her commission on July 24, 1979. She served as Chief Judge from 1999 to 2006, when Judge Jack Tarpley Camp Jr. became Chief Judge. Evans assumed senior status on December 31, 2008. She assumed inactive senior status on September 30, 2020.

==== Notable cases ====
On February 14, 2008, Evans sentenced tax protester Sherry Jackson to four consecutive prison terms of 12 months each.

On May 11, 2012, Evans decided the Cambridge University Press v. Becker case, ultimately determining that Georgia State University was the prevailing party and awarding attorneys' fees to GSU from the plaintiffs (Oxford University Press, Cambridge University Press, and SAGE Publications).

== See also ==
- List of United States federal judges by longevity of service

== Sources ==
- "Cambridge Univ. Press et al. vs. Becker et al" (PDF).
- "Sherry Jackson's Conviction Upheld". Website of the Tax Honesty News.

Legal offices
Preceded by Albert John Henderson	Judge of the United States District Court for the Northern District of Georgia; 1979–2008	Succeeded by Steve C. Jones
Preceded by George Ernest Tidwell	Chief Judge of the United States District Court for the Northern District of Georgia; 1999–2006	Succeeded by Jack Tarpley Camp Jr.
