= Charles A. Pannell Jr. =

American judge (born 1946)

Senior Judge of the United States District Court for the Northern District of Georgia
- Incumbent
- Assumed office January 31, 2013

Judge of the United States District Court for the Northern District of Georgia
- In office October 26, 1999 – January 31, 2013
- Appointed by: Bill Clinton
- Preceded by: Frank M. Hull
- Succeeded by: Eleanor L. Ross

Judge of the Conasauga Judicial Circuit, Georgia Superior Court
- In office 1979–1999

District Attorney of the Conasauga Judicial Circuit, Georgia Superior Court
- In office 1977–1979

Personal details
- Born: Charles Adam Pannell, Jr. January 24, 1946 (age 80) DeKalb County, Georgia, U.S.
- Spouse: Kate
- Education: University of Georgia (AB, JD)

Military service
- Allegiance: United States
- Branch/service: United States Army
- Years of service: 1971–1997
- Rank: Colonel
- Unit: J.A.G. Corps

Charles Adam Pannell Jr. (born January 24, 1946) is an inactive senior United States district judge of the United States District Court for the Northern District of Georgia.

== Education and career ==
Pannell was born in DeKalb County, Georgia. He received an Artium Baccalaureus degree from the University of Georgia in 1967 and a Juris Doctor from the University of Georgia School of Law in 1970. He was in the United States Army Reserves in the Judge Advocate General's Corps from 1971 to 1997. He was an assistant United States attorney of the Northern District of Georgia from 1971 to 1972, and in private practice in Georgia from 1972 to 1976. He was a special assistant attorney general of the State of Georgia from 1974 to 1976, and then a district attorney of Georgia's Conasauga Judicial Circuit from 1977 to 1979. He was a Superior court judge of the Conasauga Judicial Circuit from 1979 to 1999.

=== Federal judicial service ===
On July 14, 1999, Pannell was nominated by President Bill Clinton to a seat on the United States District Court for the Northern District of Georgia vacated by Frank M. Hull. Pannell was confirmed by the United States Senate on October 15, 1999, and received his commission on October 26, 1999. Pannell assumed senior status on January 31, 2013, and inactive senior status on September 30, 2024.

== Sources ==
Legal offices
Preceded by Frank M. Hull	Judge of the United States District Court for the Northern District of Georgia; 1999–2013	Succeeded by Eleanor L. Ross
