= Courts of Georgia (U.S. state) =

Courts of Georgia include:

State courts of Georgia

- Supreme Court of Georgia
  - Georgia Court of Appeals
    - Georgia Superior Courts (49 judicial circuits)
    - Georgia State-wide Business Court
      - Georgia State Courts
        - Georgia Magistrate Courts
        - Georgia Juvenile Courts
        - Georgia Probate Courts
        - Georgia Municipal Courts

Federal courts located in Georgia

- United States Court of Appeals for the Eleventh Circuit (headquartered in Atlanta, having jurisdiction over the United States District Courts of Alabama, Florida, and Georgia)
- United States District Court for the Northern District of Georgia
- United States District Court for the Middle District of Georgia
- United States District Court for the Southern District of Georgia

Former federal courts of Georgia

- United States District Court for the District of Georgia (extinct, subdivided)

== See also ==
- Judiciary of Georgia (U.S. state)
