= William S. Duffey Jr. =

American judge (born 1952)

William Simon Duffey Jr.
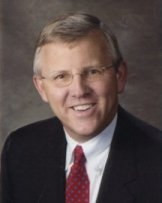

Judge of the United States District Court for the Northern District of Georgia
- In office July 12, 2004 – July 1, 2018
- Appointed by: George W. Bush
- Preceded by: J. Owen Forrester
- Succeeded by: J. P. Boulee

Personal details
- Born: William Simon Duffey Jr. 1952 (age 73–74) Philadelphia, Pennsylvania, U.S.
- Education: Drake University (BA); University of South Carolina Law School (JD)

William Simon Duffey Jr. (born 1952) is a former United States district judge of the United States District Court for the Northern District of Georgia.

== Education and career ==
Born in Philadelphia, Pennsylvania, Duffey received a Bachelor of Arts degree from Drake University in 1973 and a Juris Doctor from the University of South Carolina Law School in 1977. He was a private practice from 1977 to 1978, and was an assistant staff judge advocate, United States Air Force from 1978 to 1981. He was in private practice in Atlanta, Georgia from 1981 to 2001. He was a deputy and associate independent counsel, Office of Independent Counsel for the Whitewater investigation from 1994 to 1995. He was an adjunct professor at the University of South Carolina in 2000. He was the United States Attorney for the Northern District of Georgia from 2001 to 2004.

== Federal judicial service ==
On November 5, 2003, Duffey was nominated by President George W. Bush to a seat on the United States District Court for the Northern District of Georgia vacated by J. Owen Forrester. Duffey was confirmed by the United States Senate on June 16, 2004. He received his commission on July 1, 2004. He retired from active service on July 1, 2018.

Legal offices
Preceded by Richard H. Deane, Jr.	United States Attorney for the Northern District of Georgia; 2001–2004	Succeeded by David Nahmias
Preceded by J. Owen Forrester	Judge of the United States District Court for the Northern District of Georgia; 2004–2018	Succeeded by J. P. Boulee
