= Richard W. Story =

American judge (born 1953)

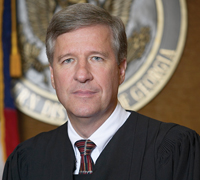

Senior Judge of the United States District Court for the Northern District of Georgia
- Incumbent
- Assumed office December 1, 2018

Judge of the United States District Court for the Northern District of Georgia
- In office February 4, 1998 – December 1, 2018
- Appointed by: Bill Clinton
- Preceded by: William Clark O'Kelley
- Succeeded by: Steven D. Grimberg

Personal details
- Born: Ricky Wayne Story; 1953 (age 72–73) Augusta, Georgia, U.S.
- Education: LaGrange College (BA); University of Georgia (JD)

Richard Wayne Story (born in 1953) is a senior United States district judge of the United States District Court for the Northern District of Georgia.

== Education and career ==
Story was born Ricky Wayne Story in Augusta, Georgia, legally changing his name to Richard in 1977. He received a Bachelor of Arts degree from LaGrange College in 1975 and a Juris Doctor from the University of Georgia School of Law in 1978. Story was in private practice in Gainesville, Georgia from 1978 to 1986. He was a part-time special assistant attorney general of Georgia from 1980 to 1984.

== Judicial service ==
=== State judicial service ===
Story was a part-time judge of the Juvenile Court of Hall County, Georgia from 1985 to 1986. He was a Chief Judge, Northeastern Judicial Circuit of the Superior Court of Georgia from 1986 to 1997.

=== Federal judicial service ===
Story was nominated by President Bill Clinton to be a United States District Judge of the United States District Court for the Northern District of Georgia on September 15, 1997, to a seat vacated by William Clark O'Kelley. He was confirmed by the United States Senate on January 28, 1998, and received his commission on February 4, 1998. He assumed senior status on December 1, 2018.

== Sources ==
Legal offices
Preceded by William Clark O'Kelley	Judge of the United States District Court for the Northern District of Georgia; 1998–2018	Succeeded by Steven D. Grimberg
