= Lewis Render Morgan =

American judge (1913–2001)

Senior Judge of the United States Court of Appeals for the Eleventh Circuit
- In office October 1, 1981 – November 15, 2001

Senior Judge of the United States Court of Appeals for the Fifth Circuit
- In office September 1, 1978 – October 1, 1981

Judge of the United States Court of Appeals for the Fifth Circuit
- In office July 25, 1968 – September 1, 1978
- Appointed by: Lyndon B. Johnson
- Preceded by: Elbert Tuttle
- Succeeded by: Phyllis A. Kravitch

Chief Judge of the United States District Court for the Northern District of Georgia
- In office 1965–1968
- Preceded by: Frank Arthur Hooper
- Succeeded by: Sidney Oslin Smith Jr.

Judge of the United States District Court for the Northern District of Georgia
- In office August 10, 1961 – August 2, 1968
- Appointed by: John F. Kennedy
- Preceded by: Seat established by 75 Stat. 80
- Succeeded by: Albert John Henderson

Personal details
- Born: Lewis Render Morgan; July 14, 1913 LaGrange, Georgia, U.S.
- Died: November 15, 2001 (aged 88) LaGrange, Georgia, U.S.
- Education: University of Georgia School of Law (LLB)

Lewis Render Morgan (July 14, 1913 – November 15, 2001) was a United States circuit judge of the United States Court of Appeals for the Fifth Circuit and of the United States Court of Appeals for the Eleventh Circuit and previously was a United States district judge of the United States District Court for the Northern District of Georgia.

== Education and career ==
Born in LaGrange, Georgia, Morgan attended University of Michigan at Ann Arbor 1930 to 1932 and received a Bachelor of Laws from the University of Georgia School of Law in 1935. He served in the United States Army Signal Corps during World War II, from 1942 to 1943 and became a corporal. He was in private practice in LaGrange from 1935 to 1961. He was a member of the Georgia General Assembly from 1937 to 1939. He was executive secretary to United States Representative A. Sidney Camp from 1939 to 1942. He served as city attorney of LaGrange from 1943 to 1946, and county attorney of Troup County, Georgia, from 1957 to 1961.

== Federal judicial service ==
Morgan was nominated by President John F. Kennedy on July 24, 1961, to the United States District Court for the Northern District of Georgia, to a new seat created by 75 Stat. 80. He was confirmed by the United States Senate on August 9, 1961, and received his commission on August 10, 1961. He served as Chief Judge from 1965 to 1968. His service was terminated on August 2, 1968, due to elevation to the Fifth Circuit.

Morgan was nominated by President Lyndon B. Johnson on July 17, 1968, to a seat on the United States Court of Appeals for the Fifth Circuit. He was confirmed by the Senate on July 25, 1968, and received his commission the same day. He assumed senior status on September 1, 1978. He was reassigned by operation of law to the United States Court of Appeals for the Eleventh Circuit on October 1, 1981. His service was terminated on November 15, 2001, due to his death in LaGrange.

== Sources ==
Legal offices
Preceded by Seat established by 75 Stat. 80	Judge of the United States District Court for the Northern District of Georgia; 1961–1968	Succeeded by Albert John Henderson
Preceded by Frank Arthur Hooper	Chief Judge of the United States District Court for the Northern District of Georgia; 1965–1968	Succeeded by Sidney Oslin Smith Jr.
Preceded by Elbert Tuttle	Judge of the United States Court of Appeals for the Fifth Circuit; 1968–1978	Succeeded by Phyllis A. Kravitch
