= United States Court of Appeals for the Eleventh Circuit =

Current United States federal appellate court

- (11th Cir.)
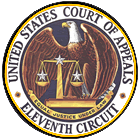

- Location: Elbert P. Tuttle U.S. Court of Appeals Building (Atlanta, Georgia)
- Appeals from: Middle District of Alabama; Northern District of Alabama; Southern District of Alabama; Middle District of Florida; Northern District of Florida; Southern District of Florida; Middle District of Georgia; Northern District of Georgia; Southern District of Georgia
- Established: October 1, 1981
- Judges: 12
- Circuit Justice: Clarence Thomas
- Chief Judge: William H. Pryor Jr.
- ca11.uscourts.gov

The United States Court of Appeals for the Eleventh Circuit (in case citations, 11th Cir.) is a federal appellate court over the following U.S. district courts:

- Middle District of Alabama
- Northern District of Alabama
- Southern District of Alabama
- Middle District of Florida
- Northern District of Florida
- Southern District of Florida
- Middle District of Georgia
- Northern District of Georgia
- Southern District of Georgia

These districts were originally part of the Fifth Circuit, but were split off to form the Eleventh Circuit on October 1, 1981. For this reason, Fifth Circuit decisions from before this split are considered binding precedent in the Eleventh Circuit.

The court is based at the Elbert P. Tuttle U.S. Court of Appeals Building in Atlanta, Georgia. The building is named for Elbert Tuttle, who served as Chief Judge of the Fifth Circuit in the 1960s and was known for issuing decisions which advanced the civil rights of African-Americans.

The Eleventh Circuit is one of the 13 United States courts of appeals.

== Creation of the Eleventh Circuit ==
The Eleventh Circuit Court of Appeals was created in 1981. The decision to create a new Eleventh Circuit Court of Appeals was contentious, with the debate over the reorganization of the Fifth Circuit lasting nearly two decades. The question of creating a new circuit first arose in the early 1960s as the Southern states contained within the Fifth Circuit underwent major changes including rapid population growth and regional industrialization and specialization. Both of these factors led to an increase in the Fifth Circuit's caseload, necessitating the addition of more judges to the Court.During this time, the Fifth Circuit also became known for their jurisprudence on cases pertaining to desegregation and voting rights for African Americans. This led to opposition from groups who believed the Fifth Circuit judges were inappropriately utilising judicial activism to advance civil rights. These groups wanted to divide the court, and create a new Eleventh Circuit in order to decrease the Fifth Circuit judges’ power to advance civil rights cases from the bench.

While more liberal judges on the court, like Chief Justice Tuttle, did not necessarily favor a split, they believed that more judges were necessary for the court to function properly. By 1963, in a 7-2 vote, the judges of the Fifth Circuit voted in favor of reorganization, if dividing the circuit was the only way to add judges to the court. However, legislation creating the Eleventh Circuit was still not passed for another 17 years. In this duration, the 1966 Omnibus Act provided some relief to overwhelmed Fifth Circuit judges by placing temporary judges on the Court to handle their overwhelming caseload.

Two months prior to the passage of the Fifth Circuit Court of Appeals Reorganization Act, the judges of the Fifth Court exercised the power granted to them through the Omnibus Judgeship Act, dividing the Fifth Circuit into two units; one consisting of Texas, Louisiana, and Mississippi and the other Florida, Georgia and Alabama. After Congress voted unanimously to pass the Fifth Circuit Court of Appeals Reorganization Act on October 14, 1980, this second unit was set to become the Eleventh Circuit the following year.

On October 1, 1981, when the Fifth Circuit was officially split, the Eleventh Circuit was formed by 12 Fifth Circuit Judges who left the Fifth to create the new Eleventh Circuit.

Today, the Eleventh Circuit Historical Society, which was first established in 1983 and is not officially connected to the Eleventh Circuit Court, records the history of the court and collects material articles related to Eleventh Circuit court and its judges. Eleventh Circuit Chief Judge William Pryor serves as an honorary chairman of the Society.

== The court today ==
Judges on the United States Circuit Court of Appeals hear most cases in three-judge panels, however cases with significant policy implications may be heard en banc by all active judges. The Eleventh Circuit Court has not been expanded since its creation when 12 seats from the Fifth Circuit were reassigned to the Eleventh Circuit. It is the only United States Circuit Court of Appeals without additional seats created since its inception. As of February 2026, five active judges are appointees of democratic presidents. Seven active judges have been appointed by republican presidents, and six judges alone were appointed by President Trump. Since 2008, the University of Miami has published an annual updated review of the Eleventh Circuit’s Juris Prudence, providing guidance to litigators who practice within the Eleventh Circuit and providing critical analysis of the Circuit Court’s decisions.

== Current composition of the court ==
As of January 2, 2025:

| # | Title | Judge | Duty station | Born | Term of service | | | Appointed by |
| # | Title | Judge | Duty station | Born | Active | Chief | Senior | Appointed by |
|---|---|---|---|---|---|---|---|---|
| 29 | Chief Judge | William H. Pryor Jr. | Birmingham, AL | 1962 | 2004–present (Note: Recess appointment; formally nominated on April 9, 2003, given a recess appointment on February 20, 2004, confirmed by the United States Senate on June 9, 2005, and received commission on June 10, 2005) | 2020–present | — | G.W. Bush |
| 31 | Circuit Judge | Adalberto Jordan | Miami, FL | 1961 | 2012–present | — | — | Obama |
| 32 | Circuit Judge | Robin S. Rosenbaum | Fort Lauderdale, FL | 1966 | 2014–present | — | — | Obama |
| 34 | Circuit Judge | Jill A. Pryor | Atlanta, GA | 1963 | 2014–present | — | — | Obama |
| 35 | Circuit Judge | Kevin Newsom | Birmingham, AL | 1972 | 2017–present | — | — | Trump |
| 36 | Circuit Judge | Elizabeth L. Branch | Atlanta, GA | 1968 | 2018–present | — | — | Trump |
| 37 | Circuit Judge | Britt Grant | Atlanta, GA | 1978 | 2018–present | — | — | Trump |
| 38 | Circuit Judge | Robert J. Luck | Tallahassee, FL | 1979 | 2019–present | — | — | Trump |
| 39 | Circuit Judge | Barbara Lagoa | Miami, FL | 1967 | 2019–present | — | — | Trump |
| 40 | Circuit Judge | Andrew L. Brasher | Birmingham, AL | 1981 | 2020–present | — | — | Trump |
| 41 | Circuit Judge | Nancy Abudu | Atlanta, GA | 1974 | 2023–present | — | — | Biden |
| 42 | Circuit Judge | Embry Kidd | Orlando, FL | 1983 | 2025–present | — | — | Biden |
| 9 | Senior Judge | Gerald Bard Tjoflat | Jacksonville, FL | 1929 | 1981–2019 (Note: Reassigned from the 5th Circuit.) | 1989–1996 | 2019–present | Ford / Operation of law |
| 15 | Senior Judge | R. Lanier Anderson III | Macon, GA | 1936 | 1981–2009 | 1999–2002 | 2009–present | Carter / Operation of law |
| 19 | Senior Judge | James Larry Edmondson | Jasper, GA | 1947 | 1986–2012 | 2002–2009 | 2012–present | Reagan |
| 22 | Senior Judge | Joel Fredrick Dubina | Montgomery, AL | 1947 | 1990–2013 | 2009–2013 | 2013–present | G.H.W. Bush |
| 23 | Senior Judge | Susan H. Black | Jacksonville, FL | 1943 | 1992–2011 | — | 2011–present | G.H.W. Bush |
| 24 | Senior Judge | Edward Earl Carnes | Montgomery, AL | 1950 | 1992–2020 | 2013–2020 | 2020–present | G.H.W. Bush |
| 26 | Senior Judge | Frank M. Hull | Atlanta, GA | 1948 | 1997–2017 | — | 2017–present | Clinton |
| 27 | Senior Judge | Stanley Marcus | West Palm Beach, FL | 1946 | 1997–2019 | — | 2019–present | Clinton |
| 28 | Senior Judge | Charles R. Wilson | Tampa, FL | 1954 | 1999–2024 | — | 2024–present | Clinton |
| 33 | Senior Judge | Julie E. Carnes | Atlanta, GA | 1950 | 2014–2018 | — | 2018–present | Obama |

== List of former judges ==
| # | Judge | State | Born–died | Active service | Chief Judge | Senior status | Appointed by | Reason for termination |
|---|---|---|---|---|---|---|---|---|
| 1 | Richard Rives | AL | 1895–1982 | — | — | 1981–1982 | Truman / Operation of law | death |
| 2 | Elbert Tuttle | GA | 1897–1996 | — | — | 1981–1996 | Eisenhower / Operation of law | death |
| 3 | Warren Leroy Jones | FL | 1895–1993 | — | — | 1981–1993 | Eisenhower / Operation of law | death |
| 4 | John Cooper Godbold | AL | 1920–2009 | 1981–1987 | 1981–1986 | 1987–2009 | L. Johnson / Operation of law | death |
| 5 | David William Dyer | FL | 1910–1998 | — | — | 1981–1998 | L. Johnson / Operation of law | death |
| 6 | John Simpson | FL | 1903–1987 | — | — | 1981–1987 | L. Johnson / Operation of law | death |
| 7 | Lewis Render Morgan | GA | 1913–2001 | — | — | 1981–2001 | L. Johnson / Operation of law | death |
| 8 | Paul Hitch Roney | FL | 1921–2006 | 1981–1989 | 1986–1989 | 1989–2006 | Nixon / Operation of law | death |
| 10 | James Clinkscales Hill | FL | 1924–2017 | 1981–1989 | — | 1989–2017 | Ford / Operation of law | death |
| 11 | Peter T. Fay | FL | 1929–2021 | 1981–1994 | — | 1994–2021 | Ford / Operation of law | death |
| 12 | Robert Smith Vance | AL | 1931–1989 | 1981–1989 | — | — | Carter / Operation of law | death |
| 13 | Phyllis A. Kravitch | GA | 1920–2017 | 1981–1996 | — | 1996–2017 | Carter / Operation of law | death |
| 14 | Frank Minis Johnson | AL | 1918–1999 | 1981–1991 | — | 1991–1999 | Carter / Operation of law | death |
| 16 | Joseph W. Hatchett | FL | 1932–2021 | 1981–1999 | 1996–1999 | — | Carter / Operation of law | retirement |
| 17 | Albert John Henderson | GA | 1920–1999 | 1981–1986 | — | 1986–1999 | Carter / Operation of law | death |
| 18 | Thomas Alonzo Clark | FL | 1920–2005 | 1981–1991 | — | 1991–2005 | Carter / Operation of law | death |
| 20 | Emmett Ripley Cox | AL | 1935–2021 | 1988–2000 | — | 2000–2021 | Reagan | death |
| 21 | Stanley F. Birch Jr. | GA | 1945–present | 1990–2010 | — | — | G.H.W. Bush | retirement |
| 25 | Rosemary Barkett | FL | 1939–present | 1994–2013 | — | — | Clinton | retirement |
| 30 | Beverly B. Martin | GA | 1955–present | 2010–2021 | — | — | Obama | retirement |

== Chief judges ==
Chief Judge
| Godbold | 1981–1986 |
| Roney | 1986–1989 |
| Tjoflat | 1989–1996 |
| Hatchett | 1996–1999 |
| Anderson | 1999–2002 |
| Edmondson | 2002–2009 |
| Dubina | 2009–2013 |
| E. Carnes | 2013–2020 |
| W. Pryor, Jr. | 2020–present |

Chief judges have administrative responsibilities with respect to their circuits, and preside over any panel on which they serve, unless the circuit justice (the Supreme Court justice responsible for the circuit) is also on the panel. Unlike the Supreme Court, where one justice is specifically nominated to be chief, the office of chief judge rotates among the circuit judges.

To be chief, a judge must have been in active service on the court for at least one year, be under the age of 65, and have not previously served as chief judge. A vacancy is filled by the judge highest in seniority among the group of qualified judges, with seniority determined first by commission date, then by age. The chief judge serves for a term of seven years, or until age 70, whichever occurs first. If no judge qualifies to be chief, the youngest judge over the age of 65 who has served on the court for at least one year shall act as chief until another judge qualifies. If no judge has served on the court for more than a year, the most senior judge shall act as chief. Judges can forfeit or resign their chief judgeship or acting chief judgeship while retaining their active status as a circuit judge.

When the office was created in 1948, the chief judge was the longest-serving judge who had not elected to retire, on what has since 1958 been known as senior status, or declined to serve as chief judge. After August 6, 1959, judges could not become or remain chief after turning 70 years old. The current rules have been in operation since October 1, 1982.

== Succession of seats ==
The court has twelve seats for active judges, numbered in the order in which they were initially filled. Judges who assume senior status enter a kind of retirement in which they remain on the bench but vacate their seats, thus allowing the U.S. President to appoint new judges to fill their seats.

Seat 1
Established on May 31, 1938 as a seat of the United States Court of Appeals for the Fifth Circuit by 52 Stat. 584
Reassigned on October 1, 1981 to the United States Court of Appeals for the Eleventh Circuit by 94 Stat. 1994
| Godbold | AL | 1981–1987 |
| Cox | AL | 1988–2000 |
| W. Pryor, Jr. | AL | 2004–present |

Seat 2
Established on June 18, 1968 as a seat of the United States Court of Appeals for the Fifth Circuit by 82 Stat. 184
Reassigned on October 1, 1981 to the United States Court of Appeals for the Eleventh Circuit by 94 Stat. 1994
| Roney | FL | 1981–1989 |
| Barkett | FL | 1994–2013 |
| Rosenbaum | FL | 2014–present |

Seat 3
Established on March 18, 1966 as a temporary seat of the United States Court of Appeals for the Fifth Circuit by 80 Stat. 75
Made permanent on June 18, 1968 by 82 Stat. 184
Reassigned on October 1, 1981 to the United States Court of Appeals for the Eleventh Circuit by 94 Stat. 1994
| Tjoflat | FL | 1981–2019 |
| Luck | FL | 2019–present |

Seat 4
Established on May 19, 1961 as a seat of the United States Court of Appeals for the Fifth Circuit by 75 Stat. 80
Reassigned on October 1, 1981 to the United States Court of Appeals for the Eleventh Circuit by 94 Stat. 1994
| Hill | GA | 1981–1989 |
| Birch, Jr. | GA | 1990–2010 |
| J. Pryor | GA | 2014–present |

Seat 5
Established on December 14, 1942 as a seat of the United States Court of Appeals for the Fifth Circuit by 56 Stat. 1050
Reassigned on October 1, 1981 to the United States Court of Appeals for the Eleventh Circuit by 94 Stat. 1994
| Fay | FL | 1981–1994 |
| Marcus | FL | 1997–2019 |
| Lagoa | FL | 2019–present |

Seat 6
Established on May 19, 1961 as a seat of the United States Court of Appeals for the Fifth Circuit by 75 Stat. 80
Reassigned on October 1, 1981 to the United States Court of Appeals for the Eleventh Circuit by 94 Stat. 1994
| Vance | AL | 1981–1989 |
| Dubina | AL | 1990–2013 |
| Newsom | AL | 2017–present |

Seat 7
Established on February 10, 1954 as a seat of the United States Court of Appeals for the Fifth Circuit by 68 Stat. 8
Reassigned on October 1, 1981 to the United States Court of Appeals for the Eleventh Circuit by 94 Stat. 1994
| Kravitch | GA | 1981–1996 |
| Hull | GA | 1997–2017 |
| Branch | GA | 2018–present |

Seat 8
Established on October 20, 1978 as a seat of the United States Court of Appeals for the Fifth Circuit by 92 Stat. 1629
Reassigned on October 1, 1981 to the United States Court of Appeals for the Eleventh Circuit by 94 Stat. 1994
| Johnson | AL | 1981–1991 |
| E. Carnes | AL | 1992–2020 |
| Brasher | AL | 2020–present |

Seat 9
Established on October 20, 1978 as a seat of the United States Court of Appeals for the Fifth Circuit by 92 Stat. 1629
Reassigned on October 1, 1981 to the United States Court of Appeals for the Eleventh Circuit by 94 Stat. 1994
| Anderson | GA | 1981–2009 |
| Martin | GA | 2010–2021 |
| Abudu | GA | 2023–present |

Seat 10
Established on October 20, 1978 as a seat of the United States Court of Appeals for the Fifth Circuit by 92 Stat. 1629
Reassigned on October 1, 1981 to the United States Court of Appeals for the Eleventh Circuit by 94 Stat. 1994
| Henderson | GA | 1981–1986 |
| Edmondson | GA | 1986–2012 |
| J. Carnes | GA | 2014–2018 |
| Grant | GA | 2018–present |

Seat 11
Established on October 20, 1978 as a seat of the United States Court of Appeals for the Fifth Circuit by 92 Stat. 1629
Reassigned on October 1, 1981 to the United States Court of Appeals for the Eleventh Circuit by 94 Stat. 1994
| Hatchett | FL | 1981–1999 |
| Wilson | FL | 1999–2024 |
| Kidd | FL | 2025–present |

Seat 12
Established on October 20, 1978 as a seat of the United States Court of Appeals for the Fifth Circuit by 92 Stat. 1629
Reassigned on October 1, 1981 to the United States Court of Appeals for the Eleventh Circuit by 94 Stat. 1994
| Clark | FL | 1981–1991 |
| Black | FL | 1992–2011 |
| Jordan | FL | 2012–present |

== See also ==
- Courts of Georgia
- Judicial appointment history for United States federal courts § Eleventh Circuit
- List of current United States circuit judges
- List of United States federal courthouses in the Eleventh Circuit
- List of United States federal courthouses in Alabama
- List of United States federal courthouses in Florida
- List of United States federal courthouses in Georgia
