= Sidney Oslin Smith Jr. =

American judge

Chief Judge of the United States District Court for the Northern District of Georgia
- In office 1968–1974
- Preceded by: Lewis Render Morgan
- Succeeded by: Newell Edenfield

Judge of the United States District Court for the Northern District of Georgia
- In office September 10, 1965 – June 1, 1974
- Appointed by: Lyndon B. Johnson
- Preceded by: William Boyd Sloan
- Succeeded by: James Clinkscales Hill

Personal details
- Born: Sidney Oslin Smith Jr. December 30, 1923 Gainesville, Georgia, U.S.
- Died: July 14, 2012 (aged 88) Gainesville, Georgia, U.S.
- Education: Harvard University (A.B.); University of Georgia School of Law (LL.B.)

Sidney Oslin Smith Jr. (December 30, 1923 – July 14, 2012) was a United States district judge of the United States District Court for the Northern District of Georgia.

== Education and career ==
Born in Gainesville, Georgia, Smith served in the United States Army during World War II, as a captain. Smith received an Artium Baccalaureus degree from Harvard University in 1947 and a Bachelor of Laws from the University of Georgia School of Law in 1949. He was in private practice in Gainesville from 1949 to 1962. He was an assistant solicitor general of the Northeastern Judicial Circuit of Georgia from 1951 to 1961.

== Federal judicial service ==
On August 24, 1965, Smith was nominated by President Lyndon B. Johnson to a seat on the United States District Court for the Northern District of Georgia, vacated by Judge William Boyd Sloan. Smith was confirmed by the United States Senate on September 10, 1965, and received his commission the same day. He served as Chief Judge from 1968 until his resignation from the bench on June 1, 1974. Smith then returned to private practice in Atlanta, Georgia. He died on July 14, 2012, in Gainesville.

== Sources ==
Legal offices
Preceded by William Boyd Sloan	Judge of the United States District Court for the Northern District of Georgia; 1965–1974	Succeeded by James Clinkscales Hill
Preceded by Lewis Render Morgan	Chief Judge of the United States District Court for the Northern District of Georgia; 1968–1974	Succeeded by Newell Edenfield
