= United States District Court for the Northern District of Georgia =

United States federal district court in Georgia (U.S. state)

- (N.D. Ga.)
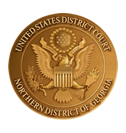
- Location: Richard B. Russell Federal Building (Atlanta) More locations: Gainesville; Newnan; Rome
- Appeals to: Eleventh Circuit
- Established: August 11, 1848
- Judges: 11
- Chief Judge: Leigh Martin May

Officers of the court
- U.S. Attorney: Theodore S. Hertzberg
- U.S. Marshal: Thomas E. Brown
- gand.uscourts.gov

The United States District Court for the Northern District of Georgia (in case citations, N.D. Ga.) is a United States district court which serves the residents of forty-six counties. These are divided up into four divisions.

Appeals from cases brought in the Northern District of Georgia are to the United States Court of Appeals for the Eleventh Circuit (except for patent claims and claims against the U.S. government under the Tucker Act, which are appealed to the Federal Circuit).

== History ==
The United States District Court for the District of Georgia was one of the original 13 courts established by the Judiciary Act of 1789, 1 Stat. 73, on September 24, 1789. The District was subdivided into Northern and Southern Districts on August 11, 1848, by 9 Stat. 280. The Middle District was formed from portions of those two Districts on May 28, 1926, by 44 Stat. 670.

== Jurisdiction ==
Jurisdiction and venue are enumerated in 28 U.S.C. § 90.

The Atlanta division includes: Cherokee, Clayton, Cobb, DeKalb, Douglas, Fulton, Gwinnett, Henry, Newton, and Rockdale counties.

The Gainesville division serves: Banks, Barrow, Dawson, Fannin, Forsyth, Gilmer, Habersham, Hall, Jackson, Lumpkin, Pickens, Rabun, Stephens, Towns, Union, and White counties.

The Newnan division hears cases for: Carroll, Coweta, Fayette, Haralson, Heard, Meriwether, Pike, Spalding, and Troup counties.

The Rome division serves: Bartow, Catoosa, Chattooga, Dade, Floyd, Gordon, Murray, Paulding, Polk, Walker, and Whitfield counties.

The United States Attorney's Office for the Northern District of Georgia represents the United States in civil and criminal litigation in the court.

As of May 13, 2025, the United States attorney is Theodore S. Hertzberg.

== Current judges ==
As of May 24, 2025:

| # | Title | Judge | Duty station | Born | Term of service | | | Appointed by |
| # | Title | Judge | Duty station | Born | Active | Chief | Senior | Appointed by |
|---|---|---|---|---|---|---|---|---|
| 40 | Chief Judge | Leigh Martin May | Atlanta | 1971 | 2014–present | 2025–present | — | Obama |
| 41 | District Judge | Mark Howard Cohen | Atlanta | 1955 | 2014–present | — | — | Obama |
| 42 | District Judge | Eleanor L. Ross | Atlanta | 1967 | 2014–present | — | — | Obama |
| 43 | District Judge | Michael Lawrence Brown | Atlanta | 1968 | 2018–present | — | — | Trump |
| 44 | District Judge | William M. Ray II | Atlanta | 1963 | 2018–present | — | — | Trump |
| 45 | District Judge | J. P. Boulee | Atlanta | 1971 | 2019–present | — | — | Trump |
| 46 | District Judge | Steven D. Grimberg | Atlanta | 1974 | 2019–present | — | — | Trump |
| 47 | District Judge | Victoria Calvert | Atlanta | 1981 | 2022–present | — | — | Biden |
| 48 | District Judge | Sarah Geraghty | Atlanta | 1974 | 2022–present | — | — | Biden |
| 49 | District Judge | Tiffany R. Johnson | Atlanta | 1986 | 2025–present | — | — | Biden |
| 50 | District Judge | vacant | — | — | — | — | — | — |
| 23 | Senior Judge | Orinda Dale Evans | inactive | 1943 | 1979–2008 | 1999–2006 | 2008–present | Carter |
| 29 | Senior Judge | Clarence Cooper | inactive | 1942 | 1994–2009 | — | 2009–present | Clinton |
| 31 | Senior Judge | Willis B. Hunt Jr. | inactive | 1932 | 1995–2005 | — | 2005–present | Clinton |
| 32 | Senior Judge | Thomas W. Thrash Jr. | Atlanta | 1951 | 1997–2021 | 2014–2021 | 2021–present | Clinton |
| 33 | Senior Judge | Richard W. Story | Atlanta; Gainesville | 1953 | 1998–2018 | — | 2018–present | Clinton |
| 34 | Senior Judge | Charles A. Pannell Jr. | inactive | 1946 | 1999–2013 | — | 2013–present | Clinton |
| 38 | Senior Judge | Amy Totenberg | Atlanta | 1950 | 2011–2021 | — | 2021–present | Obama |
| 39 | Senior Judge | Steve C. Jones | Atlanta | 1957 | 2011–2025 | — | 2025–present | Obama |

== Vacancies and pending nominations ==
| Seat | Prior judge's duty station | Seat last held by | Vacancy reason | Date of vacancy | Nominee | Date of nomination |
|---|---|---|---|---|---|---|
| 14 | Atlanta; Newnan | Timothy Batten | Retirement | May 23, 2025 | – | – |

== Former judges ==
| # | Judge | Born–died | Active service | Chief Judge | Senior status | Appointed by | Reason for termination |
|---|---|---|---|---|---|---|---|
| 1 | John Cochran Nicoll | 1793–1863 | 1848–1861 (Note: Reassigned from the District of Georgia. Jointly appointed to the Northern and Southern Districts of Georgia.) | — | — | Van Buren/Operation of law | resignation |
| 2 | John Erskine | 1813–1895 | 1865–1882 (Note: Recess appointment; formally nominated on December 20, 1865, confirmed by the United States Senate on January 22, 1866, and received commission the same day. Jointly appointed to the Northern and Southern Districts of Georgia.) | — | — | A. Johnson | reassignment |
| 3 | Henry Kent McCay | 1820–1886 | 1882–1886 | — | — | Arthur | death |
| 4 | William Truslow Newman | 1843–1920 | 1886–1920 (Note: Recess appointment; formally nominated on December 9, 1886, confirmed by the Senate on January 13, 1887, and received commission the same day.) | — | — | Cleveland | death |
| 5 | Samuel Hale Sibley | 1873–1958 | 1919–1931 | — | — | Wilson | elevation |
| 6 | Emory Marvin Underwood | 1877–1960 | 1931–1948 | — | 1948–1960 | Hoover | death |
| 7 | Robert Lee Russell | 1900–1955 | 1940–1949 | 1949 | — | F. Roosevelt | elevation |
| 8 | Maurice Neil Andrews | 1894–1967 | 1949–1950 (Note: Recess appointment; resigned before the Senate considered the appointment.) | 1949–1950 | — | Truman | resignation |
| 9 | Frank Arthur Hooper | 1895–1985 | 1949–1967 (Note: Recess appointment; formally nominated on January 5, 1950, confirmed by the Senate on February 21, 1950, and received commission on February 23, 1950.) | 1950–1965 | 1967–1985 | Truman | death |
| 10 | William Boyd Sloan | 1895–1970 | 1951–1965 | — | 1965–1970 | Truman | death |
| 11 | Lewis Render Morgan | 1913–2001 | 1961–1968 | 1965–1968 | — | Kennedy | elevation |
| 12 | Sidney Oslin Smith Jr. | 1923–2012 | 1965–1974 | 1968–1974 | — | L. Johnson | resignation |
| 13 | Newell Edenfield | 1911–1981 | 1967–1981 | 1974–1976 | 1981 | L. Johnson | death |
| 14 | Albert John Henderson | 1920–1999 | 1968–1979 | 1976–1979 | — | L. Johnson | elevation |
| 15 | Charles Allen Moye Jr. | 1918–2010 | 1970–1988 | 1979–1987 | 1988–2010 | Nixon | death |
| 16 | William Clark O'Kelley | 1930–2017 | 1970–1996 | 1988–1994 | 1996–2017 | Nixon | death |
| 17 | Richard Cameron Freeman | 1926–1999 | 1971–1991 | — | 1991–1999 | Nixon | death |
| 18 | James Clinkscales Hill | 1924–2017 | 1974–1976 | — | — | Nixon | elevation |
| 19 | Harold Lloyd Murphy | 1927–2022 | 1977–2017 | — | 2017–2022 | Carter | death |
| 20 | Marvin Herman Shoob | 1923–2017 | 1979–1991 | — | 1991–2017 | Carter | death |
| 21 | Robert L. Vining Jr. | 1931–2022 | 1979–1996 | 1995–1996 | 1996–2022 | Carter | death |
| 22 | George Ernest Tidwell | 1931–2011 | 1979–1999 | 1996–1999 | 1999–2011 | Carter | death |
| 24 | Robert Howell Hall | 1921–1995 | 1979–1990 | — | 1990–1995 | Carter | death |
| 25 | Horace Ward | 1927–2016 | 1979–1993 | — | 1993–2016 | Carter | death |
| 26 | J. Owen Forrester | 1939–2014 | 1981–2004 | — | 2004–2014 | Reagan | death |
| 27 | Jack Tarpley Camp Jr. | 1943–present | 1988–2008 | 2006–2008 | 2008–2010 | Reagan | retirement |
| 28 | Julie E. Carnes | 1950–present | 1992–2014 | 2009–2014 | — | G.H.W. Bush | elevation |
| 30 | Frank M. Hull | 1948–present | 1994–1997 | — | — | Clinton | elevation |
| 35 | Beverly B. Martin | 1955–present | 2000–2010 | — | — | Clinton | elevation |
| 36 | William S. Duffey Jr. | 1952–present | 2004–2018 | — | — | G.W. Bush | retirement |
| 37 | Timothy Batten | 1960–present | 2006–2025 | 2021–2025 | — | G.W. Bush | retirement |

== Chief judges ==
Chief judges have administrative responsibilities with respect to their district court. Unlike the Supreme Court, where one justice is specifically nominated to be chief, the office of chief judge rotates among the district court judges. To be chief, a judge must have been in active service on the court for at least one year, be under the age of 65, and have not previously served as chief judge.

A vacancy is filled by the judge highest in seniority among the group of qualified judges. The chief judge serves for a term of seven years, or until age 70, whichever occurs first. The age restrictions are waived if no members of the court would otherwise be qualified for the position.

When the office was created in 1948, the chief judge was the longest-serving judge who had not elected to retire, on what has since 1958 been known as senior status, or declined to serve as chief judge. After August 6, 1959, judges could not become or remain chief after turning 70 years old. The current rules have been in operation since October 1, 1982.

== Succession of seats ==
Seat 1
Seat reassigned from the District of Georgia on August 11, 1848 by 9 Stat. 280 (concurrent with Southern District)
| Nicoll | 1848–1861 |
| Erskine | 1865–1882 |
Seat reassigned solely to the Southern District on April 25, 1882 by 22 Stat. 47

Seat 2
Seat established on April 25, 1882 by 22 Stat. 47
| McCay | 1882–1886 |
| Newman | 1887–1920 |
Seat abolished on February 14, 1920 (temporary judgeship expired)

Seat 3
Seat established on August 5, 1919 pursuant to 40 Stat. 1156 (temporary)
Seat became permanent upon the abolition of Seat 2 on February 14, 1920
| Sibley | 1919–1931 |
| Underwood | 1931–1948 |
Seat abolished on March 5, 1948 (temporary judgeship expired)

Seat 4
Seat established on May 24, 1940 by 54 Stat. 219 (temporary)
Seat became permanent upon the abolition of Seat 3 on March 5, 1948
| Russell | 1940–1949 |
| Hooper | 1949–1967 |
| Edenfield | 1967–1981 |
| Forrester | 1981–2004 |
| Duffey, Jr. | 2004–2018 |
| Boulee | 2019–present |

Seat 5
Seat established on August 3, 1949 by 63 Stat. 493
| Andrews | 1949–1950 |
| Sloan | 1951–1965 |
| Smith, Jr. | 1965–1974 |
| Hill | 1974–1976 |
| Murphy | 1977–2017 |
| Ray II | 2018–present |

Seat 6
Seat established on May 19, 1961 by 75 Stat. 80
| Morgan | 1961–1968 |
| Henderson | 1968–1979 |
| Evans | 1979–2008 |
| Jones | 2011–2025 |
| Johnson | 2025–present |

Seat 7
Seat established on June 2, 1970 by 84 Stat. 294
| Moye, Jr. | 1970–1988 |
| Camp Jr. | 1988–2008 |
| Totenberg | 2011–2021 |
| Geraghty | 2022–present |

Seat 8
Seat established on June 2, 1970 by 84 Stat. 294
| O'Kelley | 1970–1996 |
| Story | 1998–2018 |
| Grimberg | 2019–present |

Seat 9
Seat established on June 2, 1970 by 84 Stat. 294
| Freeman | 1971–1991 |
| Cooper | 1994–2009 |
| Cohen | 2014–present |

Seat 10
Seat established on October 20, 1978 by 92 Stat. 1629
| Shoob | 1979–1991 |
| Hull | 1994–1997 |
| Pannell, Jr. | 1999–2013 |
| Ross | 2014–present |

Seat 11
Seat established on October 20, 1978 by 92 Stat. 1629
| Tidwell | 1979–1999 |
| Martin | 2000–2010 |
| May | 2014–present |

Seat 12
Seat established on October 20, 1978 by 92 Stat. 1629
| Vining, Jr. | 1979–1996 |
| Thrash, Jr. | 1997–2021 |
| Calvert | 2022–present |

Seat 13
Seat established on October 20, 1978 by 92 Stat. 1629
| Hall | 1979–1990 |
| Carnes | 1992–2014 |
| Brown | 2018–present |

Seat 14
Seat established on October 20, 1978 by 92 Stat. 1629
| Ward | 1979–1993 |
| Hunt, Jr. | 1995–2005 |
| Batten | 2006–2025 |
| vacant | 2025–present |

== U.S. Attorneys ==
- Emory Speer 1883–1885
- Ben H. Hill, Jr. 1885–1889
- Sion A. Darnell 1889–1893
- Joseph S. James 1893–1897
- Edgar A. Angier 1897–1905
- Farish C. Tate 1905–1913
- Hooper Alexander 1913–1921
- Clint W. Hager 1921–1934
- Lawrence S. Camp 1934–1942
- M. Neil Andrews 1942–1946
- J. Ellis Mundy 1946–1953
- James W. Dorsey 1953–1959
- Charles D. Read, Jr. 1959–1961
- Charles L. Goodson 1961–1977
- William L. Harper 1977–1981
- Larry D. Thompson 1982–1986
- Bob Barr 1986–1990
- Joe D. Whitley 1990–1993
- Kent B. Alexander 1994–1997
- Richard H. Deane, Jr. 1998–2001
- William S. Duffey Jr. 2001–2004
- David Nahmias 2004–2009
- Sally Yates 2010–2015
- John A. Horn 2015–2017
- BJay Pak 2017–2021
- Kurt Erskine 2021–2022
- Ryan K. Buchanan 2022–2025
- Theodore S. Hertzberg 2025–present

== See also ==
- Courts of Georgia
- Garcia-Mir v. Meese
- List of current United States district judges
- List of United States federal courthouses in Georgia
