= Newell Edenfield =

American judge

Senior Judge of the United States District Court for the Northern District of Georgia
- In office September 1, 1981 – December 26, 1981

Chief Judge of the United States District Court for the Northern District of Georgia
- In office 1974–1976
- Preceded by: Sidney Oslin Smith Jr.
- Succeeded by: Albert John Henderson

Judge of the United States District Court for the Northern District of Georgia
- In office June 12, 1967 – September 1, 1981
- Appointed by: Lyndon B. Johnson
- Preceded by: Frank Arthur Hooper
- Succeeded by: J. Owen Forrester

Personal details
- Born: Newell Edenfield; August 10, 1911 Emanuel County, Georgia, U.S.
- Died: December 26, 1981 (aged 70)
- Education: University of Georgia School of Law (LL.B.)

Newell Edenfield (August 10, 1911 – December 26, 1981) was a United States district judge of the United States District Court for the Northern District of Georgia.

== Education and career ==
Born in Emanuel County, Georgia, Edenfield received a Bachelor of Laws from the University of Georgia School of Law in 1938. He was legal editor for Edward Thomson & Co. in Brooklyn, New York from 1938 to 1941, and was then in private practice in Atlanta, Georgia from 1941 to 1942. He was a Lieutenant in the United States Navy during World War II, from 1942 to 1945. He returned to private practice in Atlanta from 1945 to 1967.

== Federal judicial service ==
On May 24, 1967, Edenfield was nominated by President Lyndon B. Johnson to a seat on the United States District Court for the Northern District of Georgia vacated by Judge Frank Arthur Hooper. Edenfield was confirmed by the United States Senate on June 12, 1967, and received his commission the same day. He served as Chief Judge from 1974 to 1976. He assumed senior status on September 1, 1981, and served in that capacity until his death on December 26, 1981.

== Sources ==
Legal offices
Preceded by Frank Arthur Hooper	Judge of the United States District Court for the Northern District of Georgia; 1967–1981	Succeeded by J. Owen Forrester
Preceded by Sidney Oslin Smith Jr.	Chief Judge of the United States District Court for the Northern District of Georgia; 1974–1976	Succeeded by Albert John Henderson
