= Hilton San Francisco Financial District =

Hotel in San Francisco, California

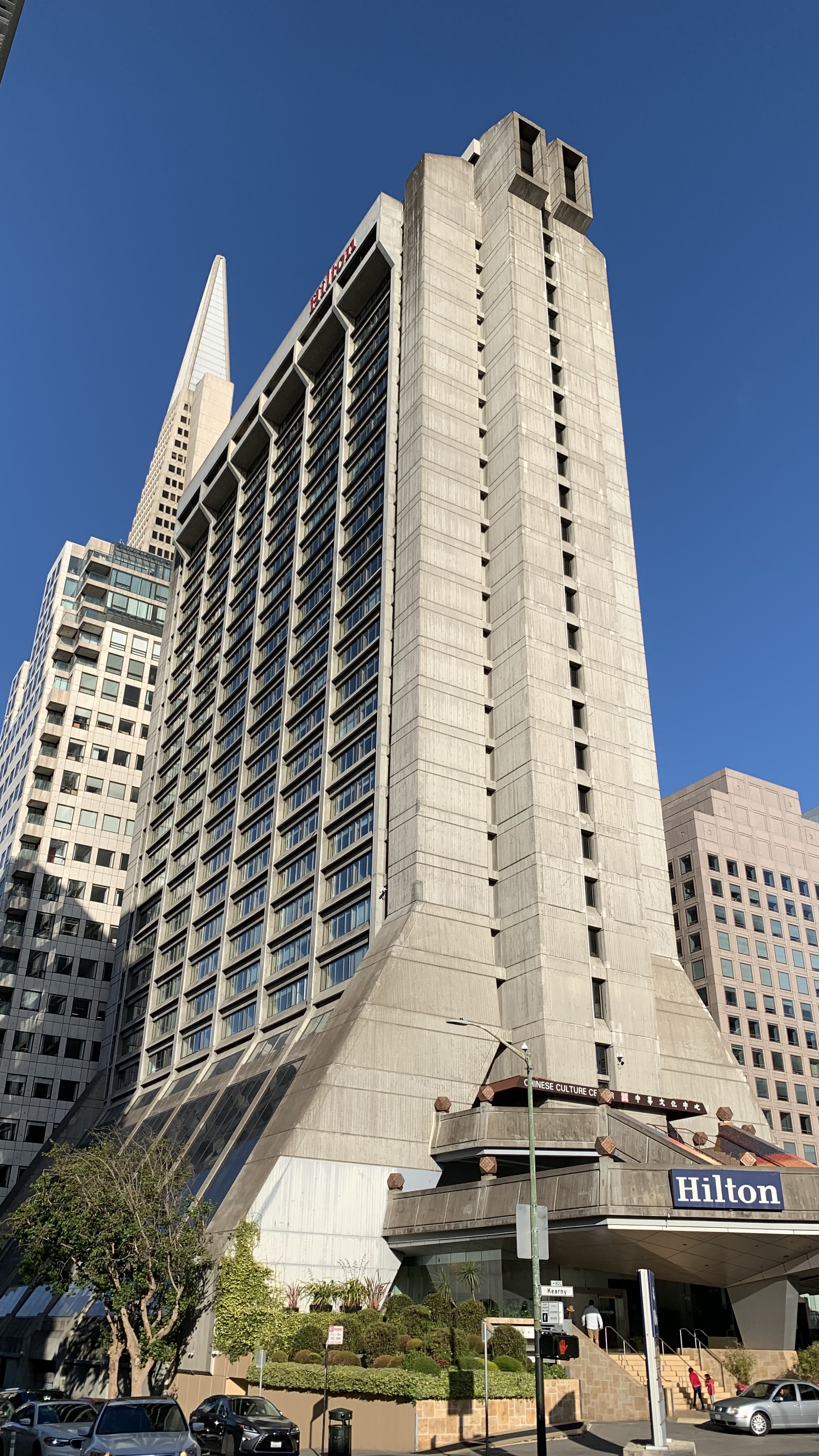
- In 2021

- Location within San Francisco Hilton San Francisco Financial District (California) Hilton San Francisco Financial District (the United States)
- Hotel chain: Hilton Hotels & Resorts

General information
- Architectural style: Brutalist
- Location: United States, 750–768 Kearny Street; San Francisco, California
- Coordinates: 37.7952°N 122.4043°W
- Opening: January 13, 1971; January 12, 2006
- Closed: June 1, 2005
- Owner: Justice Investors LP / Portsmouth Square, Inc.
- Management: Hilton Worldwide

Height
- Height: 364 ft (111 m)

Technical details
- Floor count: 30

Design and construction
- Architects: Clement Chen & Associates; Dartmond Cherk; John Carl Warnecke and Associates; Chen Chi-kwan (bridge); Robert Royston (bridge); Heller Manus; Gensler
- Developer: Justice Enterprises, Inc.

Other information
- Number of rooms: 549
- Number of restaurants: 1

Website
- Website

The Hilton San Francisco Financial District (originally the Holiday Inn Financial District but often referred to as the Holiday Inn Chinatown) is a skyscraper hotel located east across Kearny Street from Portsmouth Square on the border between the Financial District and Chinatown neighborhoods of San Francisco, California. It opened in 1971 on the site formerly occupied by the San Francisco Hall of Justice, which had served as the headquarters of the San Francisco Police Department until 1961. The Chinese Culture Center leases approximately 20,000 ft^{2} (1,900 m^{2}) within the building for rotating exhibitions at a nominal cost due to lobbying from the local Chinese-American community.

== History ==
Former buildings at 750 Kearny

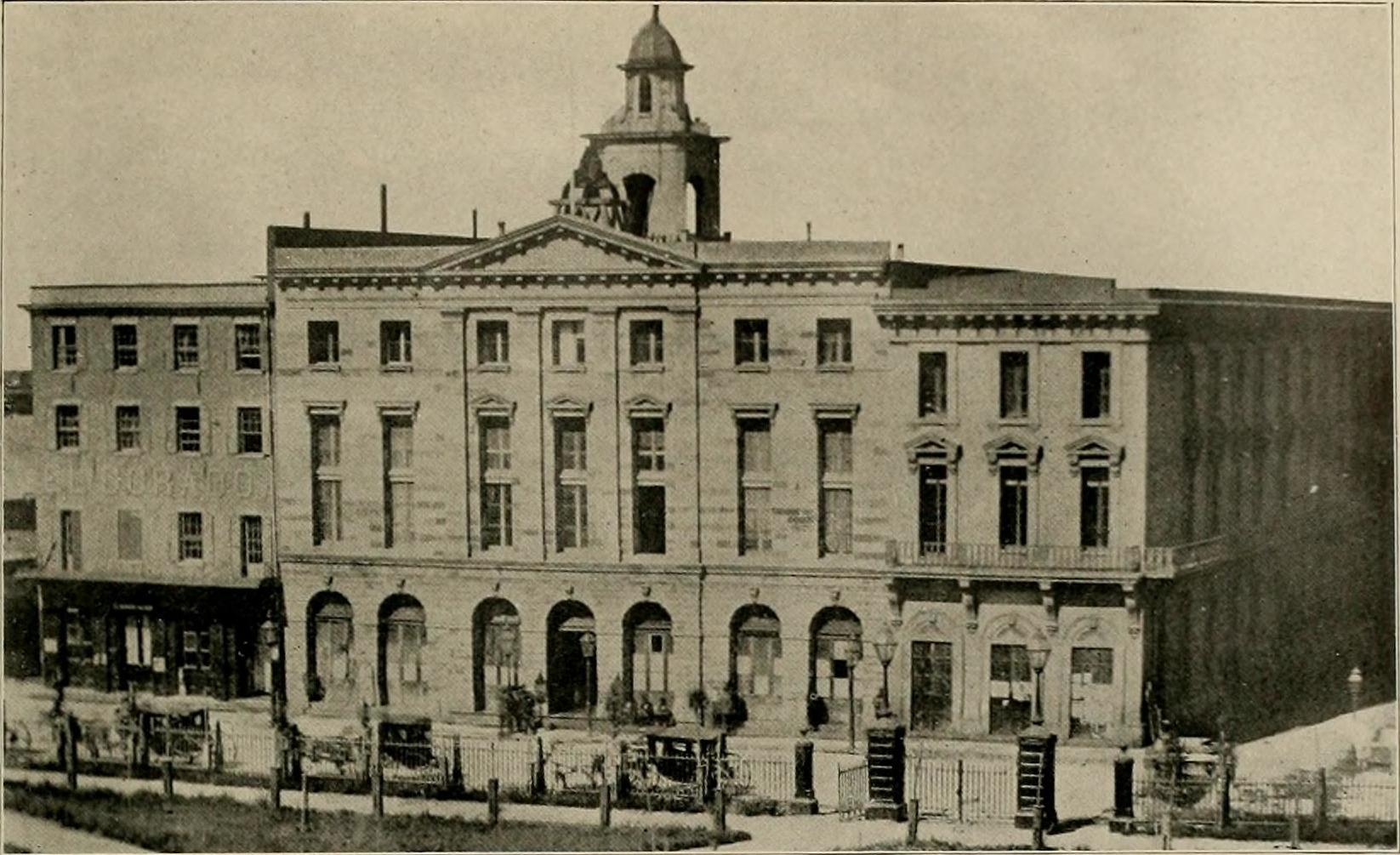
Jenny Lind Theater (c.1850s)

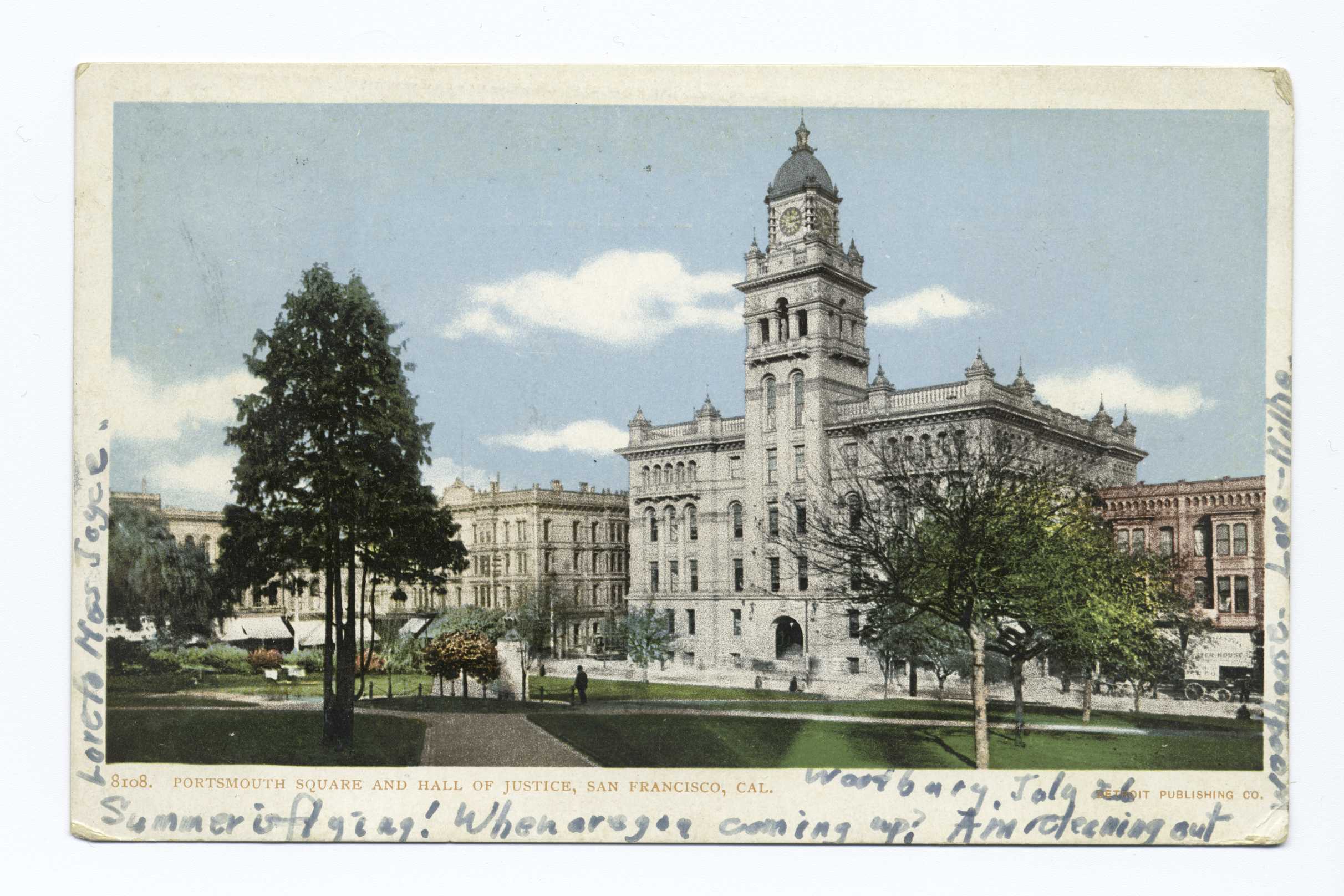
Portsmouth Square and the Hall of Justice, c.1900

The site was originally used as the Jenny Lind Theater (destroyed by fire in May and June 1851, then rebuilt) before the building was acquired by the city in 1852 for a new City Hall; on the basis of its historical significance, it was named as California Historical Landmark no. 192.

The cornerstone for the Hall of Justice and Morgue was laid in December 1896, in the block bounded by Kearny, Montgomery, Washington, and Merchant, previously occupied by the City Hall. The building was completed by September 1900; shortly thereafter its proximity to Chinatown was questioned, as "city officials and business men" found it "very obnoxious ... to have the Chinese quarters so near the new hall of justice." In the wake of the April 1906 San Francisco earthquake and fire, the Hall of Justice was gutted, but it later was rebuilt and enlarged.

After the groundbreaking ceremony was held for a new Hall of Justice in 1958, redevelopment planning began for the site. The San Francisco Planning Commission authorized the sale of the old Hall of Justice site in December 1960 and set an August 1961 move-out date for the final agencies occupying it. The San Francisco Greater Chinatown Community Service Association Organization (SFGCCSA) was formed in February 1963 to lobby the San Francisco Board of Supervisors (SFBOS), proposing to convert the old Hall of Justice into a publicly-accessible facility to serve the Chinatown community; at the time, San Francisco Mayor George Christopher was advocating for the sale of the property, which would help finance the construction of a new Central Police Station. The city announced the land would be placed on sale one month later in March, with a minimum bid of $850,000. Upon learning that Howard Johnson was planning on acquiring the land for a 21-storey motel, Choy, representing SFGCCSA, convinced the SFBOS to postpone the sale decision, giving them time to draw up a plans for converting the old Hall of Justice into a Chinese cultural and trade center. SFGCCSA hired J. Francis Ward and Associates in April 1964; that firm had previously designed the Ping Yuen public housing project in Chinatown, and assigned the redesign work to Thomas Hsieh.

In March 1965, the SFBOS voted to allow the San Francisco Redevelopment Agency (SFRA), led by M. Justin Herman, to take over planning the re-use of the site. One supervisor objected the long-delayed sale was "robbing San Francisco of needed tax revenues".

=== Justice Enterprises and Chinese Culture Foundation ===
In context, photographed facing east from the Top of the Mark by Carol Highsmith (2012); other prominent Financial District buildings pictured include the Transamerica Pyramid, 505 Montgomery Street, and Embarcadero Center; the San Francisco–Oakland Bay Bridge and Yerba Buena Island are in the background.

The site was planned to be sold to private interests at a purchase price of US$875,000 (equivalent to $8,940,000 in 2025); prospective bidders were required to pay an $85,000 deposit, with bids due no later than June 1, 1965. Under the San Francisco Downtown General Plan (1963), a pedestrian bridge along the line of Merchant Street was one of several planned improvements for the area. Herman unveiled five competing proposals by June 3; two of the five were from teams led by Chinese-Americans, characterized as "early favorites". Of the two, the design from Clement Chen Jr. and Dartmond Cherk was called "futuristic" and "eye-catching"; the other, proposed by Dr. Colin Dong and designed by Morton Rader, had a taller but more conventional hotel tower, which Rader called a "vertical Grant Avenue". A third proposal from Haas and Haynie, then contracted to build the Japan Center in the Western Addition, was designed by Stephen M. Heller and Associates. The entrants were rounded out by Milton Meyer and Co., realtors, proposing to reuse the Hall of Justice in a design by John Savage Bolles, and Justice Enterprises, Inc., with a design by Wurster, Bernardi & Emmons. Businesses interested in the development included the Sheraton Hotels and Resorts chain and Tishman Realty & Construction (supporting the Chen/Cherk design), Cahill Contractors (Justice Enterprises), and Greyhound Lines (Haas & Haynie).

Alexander Fried, art and architecture critic for the San Francisco Examiner, wrote an article enthusiastically promoting the Chen/Cherk design three weeks after the five designs were revealed. The SFGCCSA was reorganized as the Chinese Culture Foundation (CCF) of San Francisco on October 15, 1965, by financier J.K. Choy, Joe Yuey, and others. In early November, the SFBOS approved the creation of a Chinese cultural center within the old Hall of Justice site, with a minimum of 20,000 ft^{2} (1,900 m^{2}) of floor space to be dedicated for that purpose. Later that month, Harold Moose, president of Justice Enterprises, declared their proposal would meet the minimum floor space requirement at an annual rental cost of $5,000.

In December 1965, the SFRA instructed the Dong and Chen/Cherk groups to prepare more detailed plans and financial data. Tishman withdrew from the competition in April 1966, and the Justice Enterprises group adopted Chen's design, with promised support from Cahill. In October, Justice Enterprises announced that it had signed a 25-year lease with the Holiday Inn Corporation for the hotel operation, contingent on the city awarding the purchase rights to Justice for the old Hall of Justice site. Purchase rights were granted in November, pending approval from the SFBOS, and the lease was formalized in June 1967. With the lease in hand, Justice Enterprises was able to secure a $7.8 million loan to complete the financing for the project, and the demolition of the old Hall of Justice was set for early 1968. The CCF signed a fifty-year lease with Justice Enterprises on November 21, 1967, with the space to be rented at an annual cost of $1, and the lease could be extended for ten more years if the property was still being operated as a hotel.

=== Design and construction ===
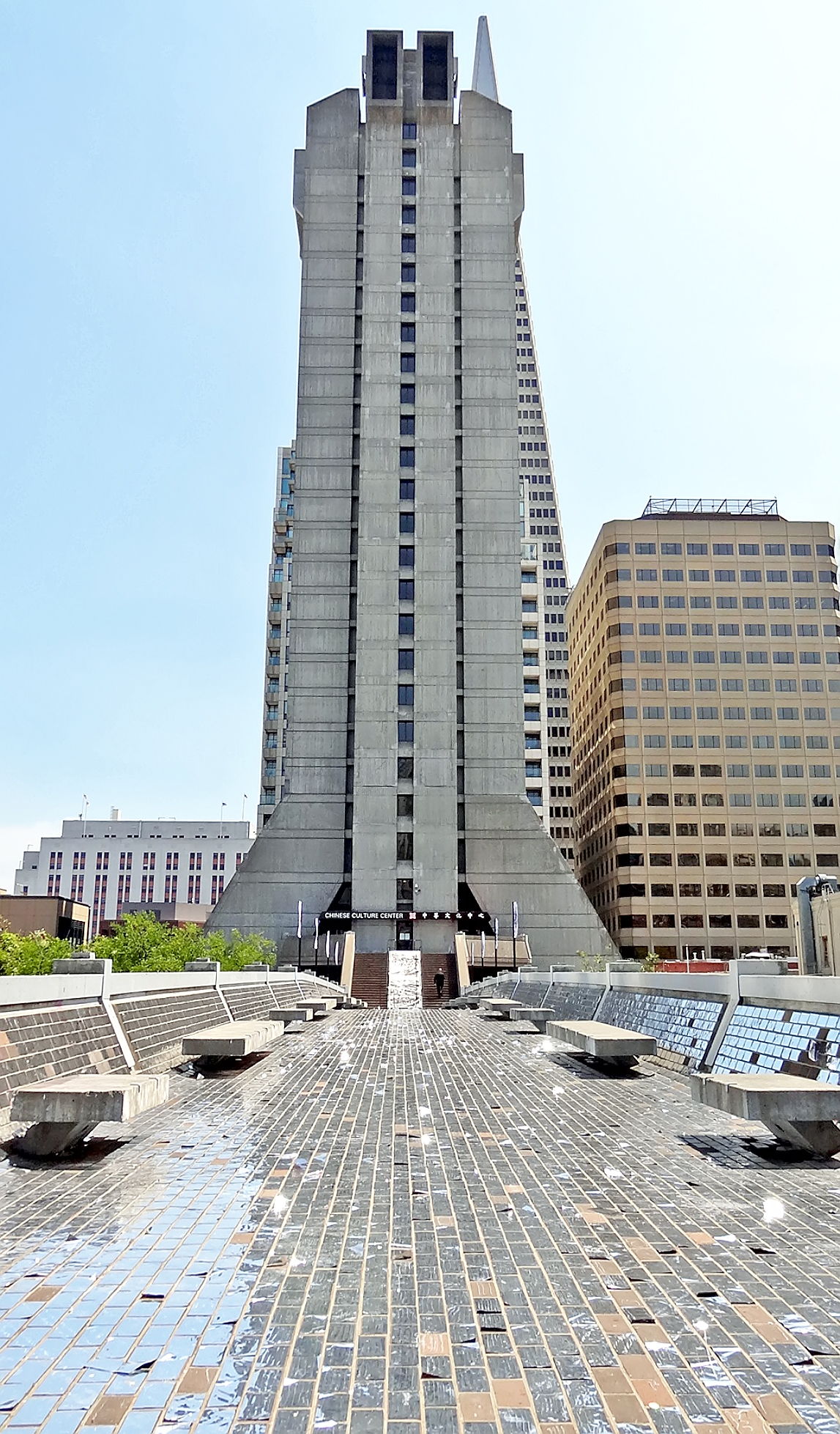
Pedestrian bridge and hotel tower (2015), including some remaining Mylar stickers for the "Sky Bridge" installation by Beili Liu

The concept was developed by a team led by Chinese-American architects Clement Chen and Dartmond Cherk, with structural engineering by T.Y. Lin. The original concept called for a tower 450 feet (140 m) tall, with a pedestrian bridge across Kearny linking it to Portsmouth Square and Chinatown. Chen stated his design was meant to be "a majestic landmark for Chinatown and San Francisco to serve as a symbol of the gateway to the Orient". A heliport was proposed for the building's roof.

The firm of John Carl Warnecke and Associates was brought on to complete detail work on the original design. Because the cost of the original 48-storey design could not be covered, Chen redesigned the building, shortening it to 27 storeys. It has since been named eligible for listing on the California Register of Historical Resources in 2021, both as an exceptional example of Brutalist architecture and as a symbol of the growing political power of the Chinatown community.

The original Chen/Cherk design also included cultural space on one of the decks in their enclosed pedestrian bridge from the hotel to Portsmouth Square. By late 1967, the double-decker bridge design was discarded in favor of a single-level bridge, with the cultural space to be incorporated into the ground floor of the hotel tower. Taiwanese architect Chen Chi-kwan and American landscape architect Robert Royston were engaged by Justice Enterprises to contribute to the bridge design, a move praised by Fried. Clement Chen later stated the bridge design was inspired by the Anji Bridge.

After the Hall of Justice was demolished, ground was broken for the new hotel on August 20, 1968. The ceremonies were attended by Mayor Joseph Alioto; Herman announced the National Palace Museum in Taiwan would make a major donation to the Chinese Culture Center within the hotel. The project was anticipated to cost $14 million (equivalent to $130 million adjusted for inflation).

By November 1969, the new tower was set to be topped out; the two uppermost floors were designed to "flare out in pagoda style" to accommodate a rooftop swimming pool. As completed in November 1970, the hotel had 572 rooms, convention and banquet halls, two dining rooms, and two cocktail lounges. Floors two, three, and four are suspended from a structural arch. The Holiday Inn Chinatown was dedicated on January 13, 1971; the Asian People's Coalition protested at the hotel's dedication ceremony, describing it as a place that would "house tourists who will come to gawk at us like animals in a zoo."

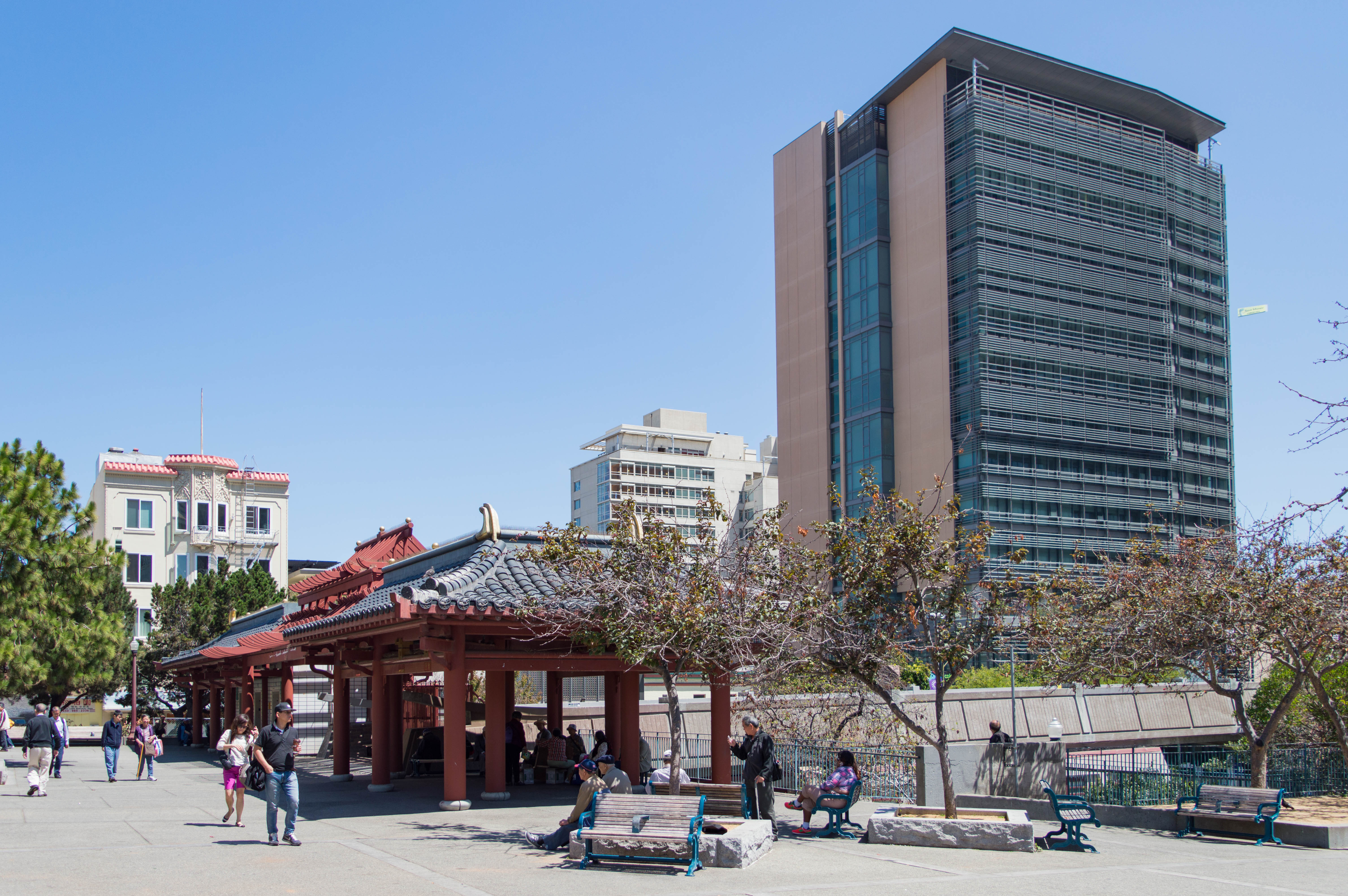
Gate and pavilion in Portsmouth Square and pedestrian bridge over Kearny (2015); CCSF Chinatown/North Beach Center prominent in background.

The pedestrian bridge linking the hotel to Chinatown was approved by city departments on November 14 (Recreation and Park) and November 21, 1968 (Planning), but required the existing playground in Portsmouth Square be relocated to avoid the heavy shadows that would be cast by the bridge. The bridge was scheduled for completion in mid-August 1971. It is 275 ft (84 m) long and 20 ft (6.1 m) wide. Critics of the bridge charged it would "make it easier for the tourists to get to Chinatown" and expressed concerns that it would "destroy" Portsmouth Square; Holiday Inn management countered that 80% of its staff were Chinese (in accordance with their agreement with Justice Enterprises) and that tourist spending would "be meat for the economy of Chinatown".

The Chinese Cultural Center, which was intended to be completed by Justice Enterprises at no cost to the CCF, was delayed due to disputes over the responsibility for additional construction costs between Justice and the CCF; the original design called for a single floor with 12 ft (3.7 m) ceilings at a budget of $70,000. As they reviewed the plans, the CCF board ordered a higher, 20 ft (6.1 m) ceiling, auditorium and mezzanine spaces, and the relocation of four structural columns. While Justice representative William Chandler charged CCF had ordered numerous structural changes, CCF pointed to the lease agreement which stated unambiguously the developer was responsible for all charges. The cost to finish the space was estimated at $100,000. The influential Chinese Consolidated Benevolent Association also disclaimed the CCF work and withdrew funding on September 22, 1970; Him Mark Lai points to a Newsweek article quoting Joe Yuey's praise of the People's Republic of China in February of that year, which led to most traditional Chinatown organizations boycotting the CCF and withdrawing pledged money. The Chinese-American community of northern California raised $560,000 to complete the Cultural Center, which began final construction in late January 1973 and held a gala opening on October 18, 1973. Him Mark Lai published a history of the CCF in 1995.

Exterior updates in 1991 include modifications to the first-floor windows on the Washington Street facade, a ramp to accommodate patrons under the Americans with Disabilities Act, new lighting, and ten new flag poles.

=== Rebranding ===
The Holiday Inn Downtown was closed on June 1, 2005, for an extensive, $40 million ($63.9 million adjusted) remodel that included asbestos abatement. It was rebranded the Hilton San Francisco Financial District when it reopened on January 12, 2006. The rooftop pool was closed following the renovation.

A clubhouse was built in Portsmouth Square under the bridge in 2001. Gates were installed at the Portsmouth Square (western) end in 2003, under a park pavilion added in 1991. The bridge was considered private property; when the gates are shut, keys are needed to access the bridge from Portsmouth Square. Hotel staff close the gate nightly at 7 PM. However, ownership of the bridge was not clear, as the original agreements from 1968 state it would be built and maintained at no cost to the city. Plans were developed under the Innovative Open Space Project starting in June 2015 to convert the bridge into a public mini-park; the Chinese Culture Center unveiled an installation by Beili Liu in August 2015, entitled "Sky Bridge", which covered the brick pavers with 50,000 mirrored Mylar stickers. Final designs announced in December included a tile mosaic entitled "Sunrise" by Mik Gaspay to be installed at the eastern end next to the hotel. "Sunrise" was unveiled on October 23, 2016.

The San Francisco Department of Recreation & Parks solicited community input for a planned renovation of Portsmouth Square in 2017 and 2018; by a margin of more than three to one, the attendees recommended removing the bridge altogether. A draft project would completely remake Portsmouth Square and remove the pedestrian bridge.

== Criticism ==
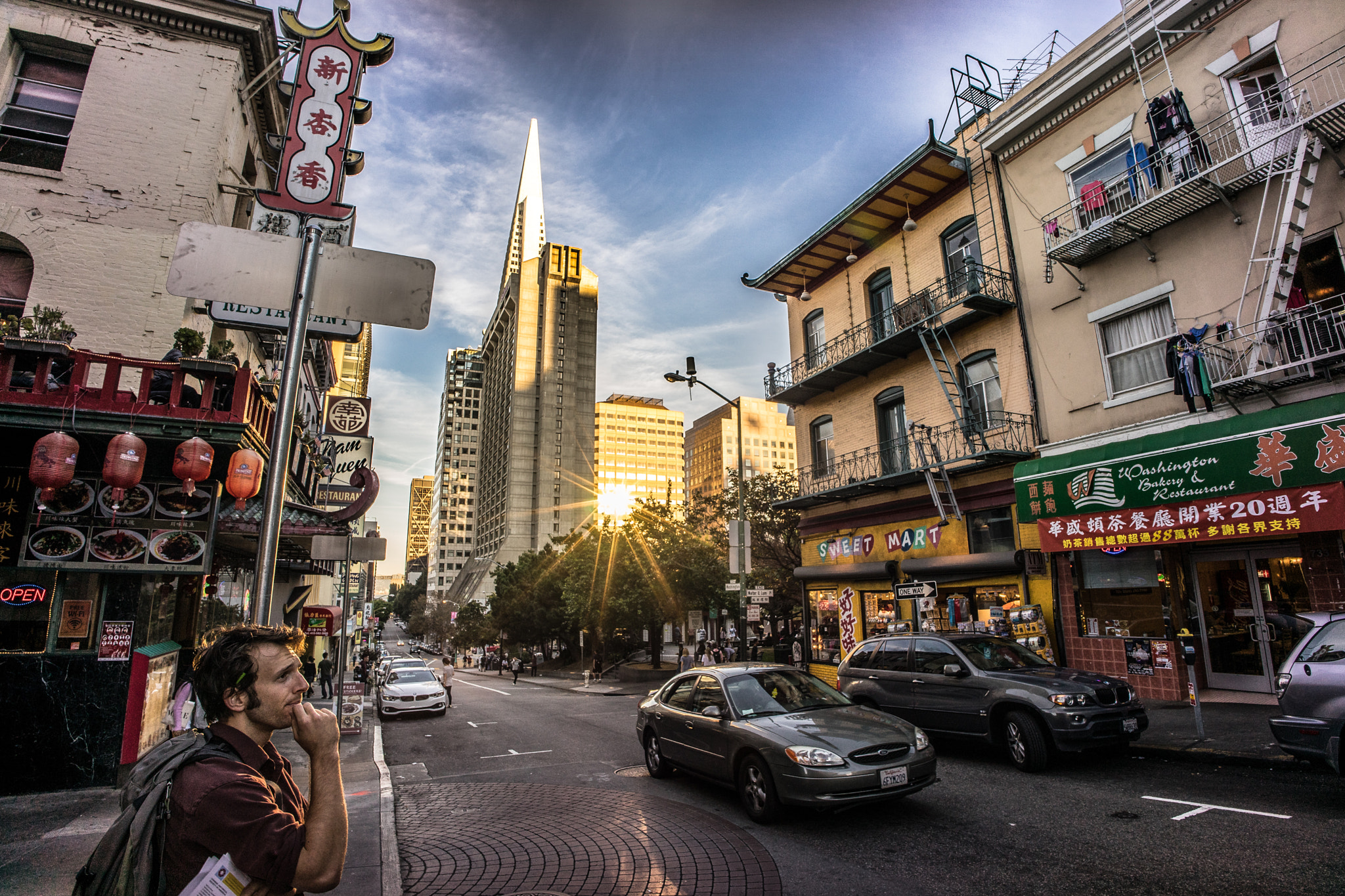
Viewed from street level (2014), corner of Washington and Wentworth

Longtime San Francisco Chronicle architecture critic Allan Temko called the Holiday Inn a "bulbous slab" that "exhibits just about every mistake that can be committed in urban design"; urban design critic John King added it was "the most unsociable chunk of concrete in San Francisco ... grim on the skyline and worse on the ground ... the harsh tower standing aloof from the sullied street". Chronicle editor Scott Newhall criticized the removal of the old Hall of Justice, which he likened to the Palazzo Medici Riccardi in Florence: "[The Hall of Justice] was one of the first grand old San Francisco municipal temples to go. The development pirates were in on the deal ... they put out the word that they were really building a Chinese cultural center. Well, Allan Temko got onto it. The 'Chinese cultural center' actually was nothing but sort of a mezzanine in a Holiday Inn."

Rebecca Solnit wrote in 2004 the bridge contributed to the evisceration of Portsmouth Square; Temko had called for its removal twenty years prior.

Alex Lehnerer noted the Holiday Inn was one of four high-rises within San Francisco, all built in the late 1960s and early 1970s, which attracted disproportionate criticism; the other three were the Bank of America Building (1969, "too big and too dark"), Embarcadero Center (1971–82, "too large and too bulky"), and the Transamerica Pyramid (1972, "too bizarre").

== In popular culture ==
Model and actress Lynda Carter performed at the new Holiday Inn's "Eight Immortals Lounge" as the lead singer for "The Garfin Gathering". Another member of the band recalls the hotel was so new there were no sidewalk-level entrances, and their audience was limited to staff and guests that were able to drive into the hotel's underground garage.

The new Holiday Inn appeared in the opening scenes of the 1971 film Dirty Harry, in which "Scorpio" shoots from 555 California and kills a swimmer at the now-closed pool on the building's roof.

== See also ==
- San Francisco's tallest buildings
