= Hall of Justice =

The Hall of Justice refers to police headquarters in some United States cities. In some cases, the facility may house courts, jails and offices of other criminal justice agencies. In some US cities, the Hall of Justice is called the Justice Center.

- Frank Murphy Hall of Justice (Detroit)
- Hall of Justice (Los Angeles)
- Hall of Justice (San Francisco)
- Hall of Justice (comics), fictional superhero headquarters in DC Comics

== See also ==
- Justice Hall (disambiguation)
