= China banks =

China banks may refer to:

Places:

- China Banks (skate spot)

Financial Institutions:

- Chinabank
- Bank of China
- People's Bank of China
- List of banks in China
- List of banks in Taiwan
- Central Bank of the Republic of China (Taiwan)
