= Judge Hall =

Judge Hall may refer to:

- Cynthia Holcomb Hall (1929–2011), judge of the United States Court of Appeals for the Ninth Circuit
- Dominic Augustin Hall (1765–1820), judge of the United States Circuit Court for the Fifth Circuit
- James Randal Hall (born 1958), judge of the United States District Court for the Southern District of Georgia
- Janet C. Hall (born 1948), judge of the United States District Court for the District of Connecticut
- Jennifer L. Hall (born 1976), judge of the United States District Court for the District of Delaware
- Kenneth Keller Hall (1918–1999), judge of the United States Court of Appeals for the Fourth Circuit
- LaShann DeArcy Hall (born 1970), judge of the United States District Court for the Eastern District of New York
- Maxwell Hall (1884–1966), British colonial judge
- Nathan K. Hall (1810–1874), judge of the United States District Court for the Northern District of New York
- Peirson Mitchell Hall (1894–1979), judge of the United States District Courts for the Southern and Central Districts of California
- Peter W. Hall (1948–2021), judge of the United States Court of Appeals for the Second Circuit
- Robert Howell Hall (1921–1995), judge of the United States District Court for the Northern District of Georgia
- Sam B. Hall Jr. (1924–1994), judge of the United States District Court for the Eastern District of Texas
- Willard Hall (1780–1875), judge of the United States District Court for the District of Delaware

== See also ==
- Justice Hall (disambiguation)
