= Justice Hall =

Justice Hall may refer to:

== Literature ==
- Justice Hall (novel), the sixth book in the Mary Russell series by Laurie R. King

== People ==
- Benjamin F. Hall (1814–1891), chief justice of the Colorado Territorial Supreme Court
- Benoni Hall (1710–1779), associate justice of the Rhode Island Supreme Court
- Burton Hall (judge) (born 1947), chief justice of the Supreme Court of the Bahamas
- Dominic Augustin Hall (1765–1820), associate justice of the Louisiana Supreme Court
- Frank H. Hall (judge) (1890–1964), associate justice of the Colorado Supreme Court
- Frank P. Hall (1870–1926), associate justice of the Tennessee Supreme Court
- Fred Hall (1916–1970), chief justice of the Kansas Supreme Court
- Frederick B. Hall (1843–1913), associate justice of the Connecticut Supreme Court
- Frederick Wilson Hall (1908–1984), associate justice of the New Jersey Supreme Court
- Gordon R. Hall (born 1926), chief justice of the Utah Supreme Court
- Hiland Hall (1795–1885), associate justice of the Vermont Supreme Court
- John Hall (judge) (1767–1833), associate justice of the North Carolina Supreme Court
- Jonathan C. Hall (1808–1874), associate justice of the Iowa Supreme Court
- Lot Hall (1757–1809), associate justice of the Vermont Supreme Court
- Pike Hall Jr. (1931–1999), associate justice of the Louisiana Supreme Court
- Robert Howell Hall (1921–1995), associate justice of the Supreme Court of Georgia
- Samuel A. Hall (died 1887), associate justice of the Supreme Court of Georgia
- William Hall (Rhode Island) (fl. 1740s–1760s), associate justice of the Rhode Island Supreme Court

== See also ==
- Judge Hall (disambiguation)
- Hall of Justice (disambiguation)
