= Luce Memorial Chapel =

Chapel in Xitun, Taichung, Taiwan

- 路思義敎堂
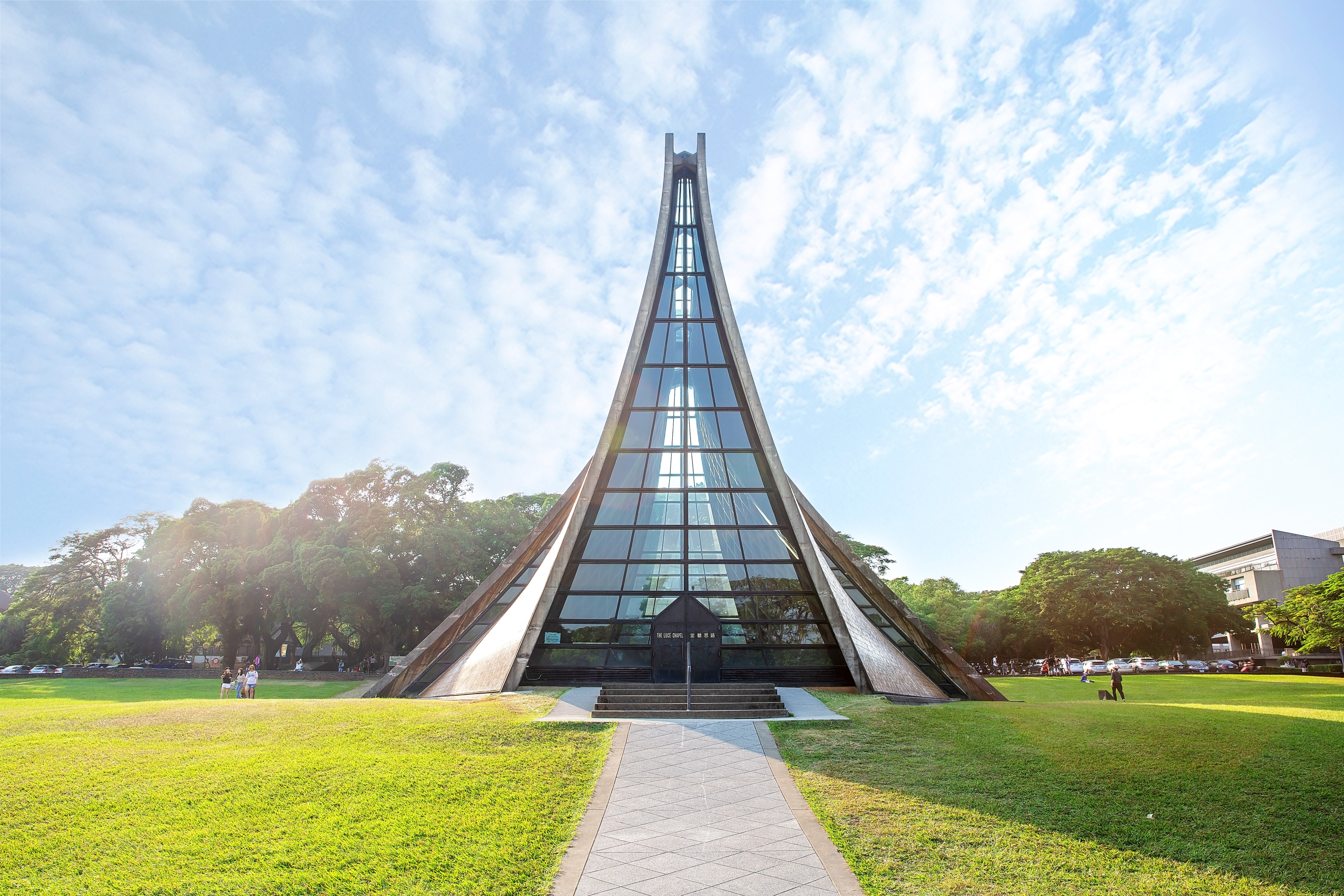
- Luce Memorial Chapel
- 24°10′44″N 120°36′02″E
- Location: Xitun, Taichung, Taiwan

History
- Founded: November 1963

Architecture
- Architect(s): I. M. Pei (Chinese: 貝聿銘) and Chi-kuan Chen (Chinese: 陳其寬)
- Architectural type: Chapel
- Years built: 1962-1963
- Groundbreaking: September 1962
- Completed: November 1963
- Construction cost: $US125,000

The Luce Memorial Chapel (traditional Chinese: 路思義教堂; simplified Chinese: 路思义敎堂; pinyin: Lùsī Yì Jiàotáng) is a Christian chapel on the campus of Tunghai University in Xitun District, Taichung, Taiwan. It was designed by architects I. M. Pei and Chi-kuan Chen.

== Name ==
The chapel was named in honor of the Rev. Henry W. Luce, an American missionary in China in the late 19th century and father of publisher Henry R. Luce.

== History ==
The project was originally planned in April 1954 but put on hold until July 1960.[3] Construction took place from September 1962 until November 1963.[4] Construction costs totaled US$125,000.[1]

In 2022, Tunghai University launched a restoration project for Luce Memorial Chapel to address long-term deterioration, including water leakage and aging facilities. The restoration was completed in 2024, and the chapel reopened that year.

== Architecture ==
The chapel is located on a 3-acre zone in the center of campus, and is set on an irregular hexagonal base, providing 477 m^{2} of gross floor area, including the 245 m^{2} nave (with 500 seats), 81 m^{2} chancel, and 44 m^{2} robing rooms. The church itself is a tent-like conoid structure, with four warped leaves rising to 19.2 m high, establishing itself as a central landmark on campus.

The chapel was first conceived as a multi-planar, wooden structure, but the architects soon abandoned the idea of using wood due both to the humid environment and to seismic concerns. The form of four curved surfaces built with reinforced concrete was likely influenced by the design of the Philips Pavilion, designed by renowned architect Le Corbusier for the Brussels World's Fair (known as Expo 58) in 1958. However, unlike the Philips Pavilion and other contemporary ruled-surface buildings of the era, Luce Chapel is not a thin-shell structure. The chapel's planes are composed of lattice beams that gradually grow thicker as they descend. The structural concept might be influenced by that of the Yale University Art Gallery, completed in 1953 and designed by Louis Kahn, another noted architect of the time. The exterior of the chapel is covered with yellow, glazed, diamond-shaped tiles echoing the diamond-shaped coffer beams on the building's interior. The chapel's elaborate reinforced concrete formwork was created by local craftsmen.

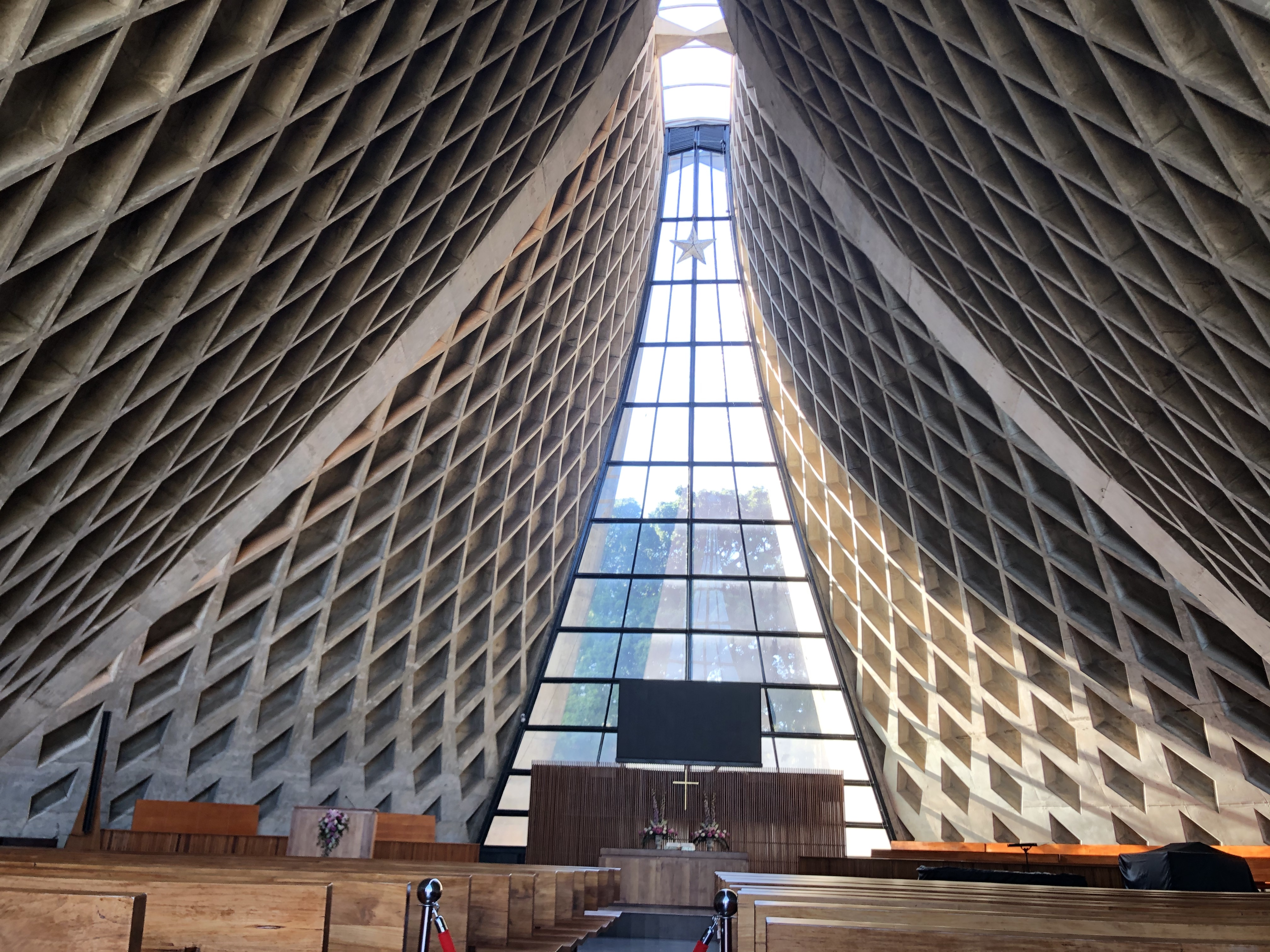
Interior of Luce Memorial Chapel, Tunghai University, Taiwan.

== See also ==
- Tunghai University
- Christianity in Taiwan
