= Portsmouth Square pedestrian bridge =

Bridge in Chinatown, San Francisco, California

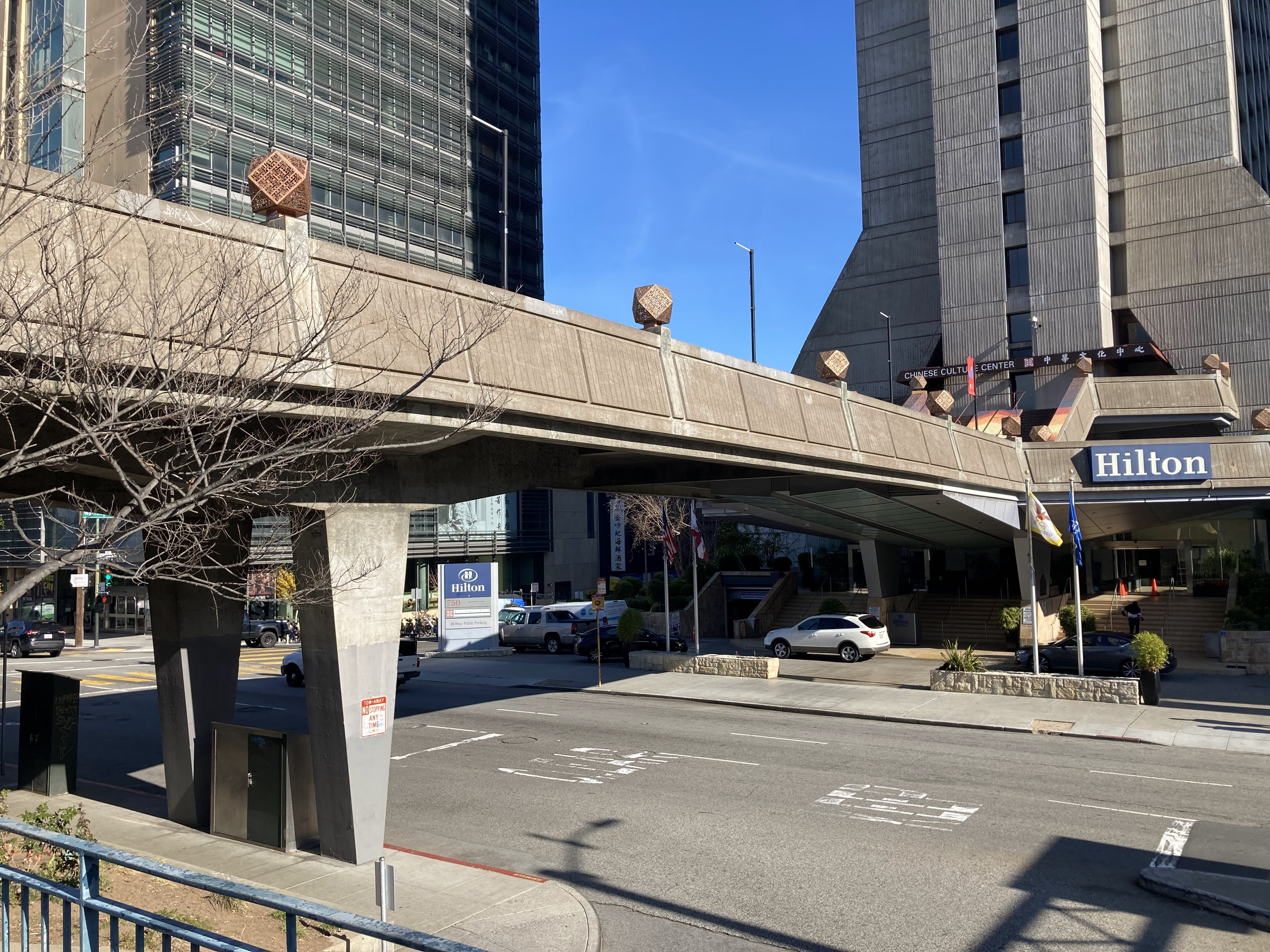
- Portsmouth Square pedestrian bridge in 2022
- Coordinates: 37°47′42″N 122°24′17″W
- Carried: pedestrians
- Crossed: Kearny Street
- Locale: Chinatown, San Francisco

Characteristics
- Total length: 240 feet (73 m)
- Width: 28 feet (8.5 m)

History
- Designer: Robert Royston and Chen Chi-kwan
- Opened: 1971
- Demolished: August 2026

Location
- Interactive map of Portsmouth Square pedestrian bridge

The Portsmouth Square pedestrian bridge (also called the Dr. Rolland and Kathryn Lowe Community Bridge) was a prominent architectural landmark in Chinatown, San Francisco, that spanned over Kearny Street from Portsmouth Square to the second floor and third floor of the Hilton San Francisco Financial District hotel, which houses the Chinese Culture Center of San Francisco. It was demolished in August 2026 as part of the Portsmouth Square renovation project.

While the bridge was intended for pedestrian access to cross the road to the Chinese Culture Center, surveys showed that it was rarely used as such, and it was denigrated by some residents as a "bridge to nowhere." Nevertheless, its brutalist architectural elements and banked sides have made it an attractive space for street skateboarders, from whom it has seen continuous use since the late 1970s, and was a mainstay in skate media. Skateboarders colloquially call it China Banks. It was also used as a public and private community space.

== History ==
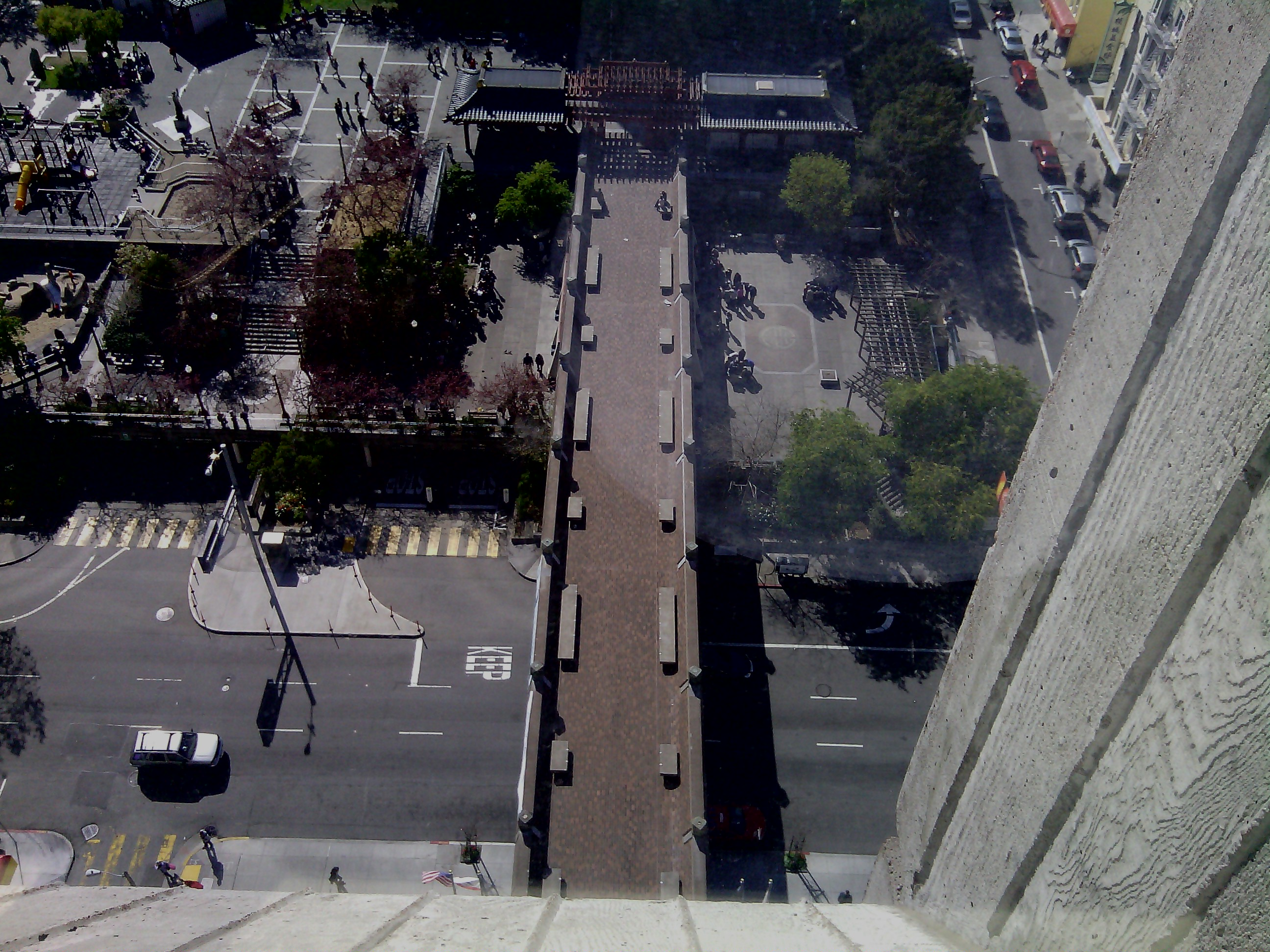
Portsmouth Square pedestrian bridge seen from above in the Hilton Hotel

From 1959 until 1963, Portsmouth Square was redesigned as a public park for the Chinatown community. Meanwhile, the Hilton San Francisco Financial District was built across the street (initially as a Holiday Inn but was later purchase by Hilton Hotels & Resorts). A bridge connecting the two was included in some of the hotel's initial designs by Chinese American immigrant Clement Chen Jr. The city gave approval to build the bridge in 1970. Construction on the bridge began that same year, and it was opened in 1971. The bridge was created as a privately owned public space. The air rights for the bridge are owned by Justice Investors, one of the companies that owns the Hilton Hotel property. While the bridge is private property, its permit is "revocable at the will of the Board of Supervisors."

A second redesign of the square began in a first phase the 1980s and a second phase in the 1990s. During the second phase of that redesign, a community room was built which was connected to the bridge on the underside of the west side. It was opened to the public in 2001.

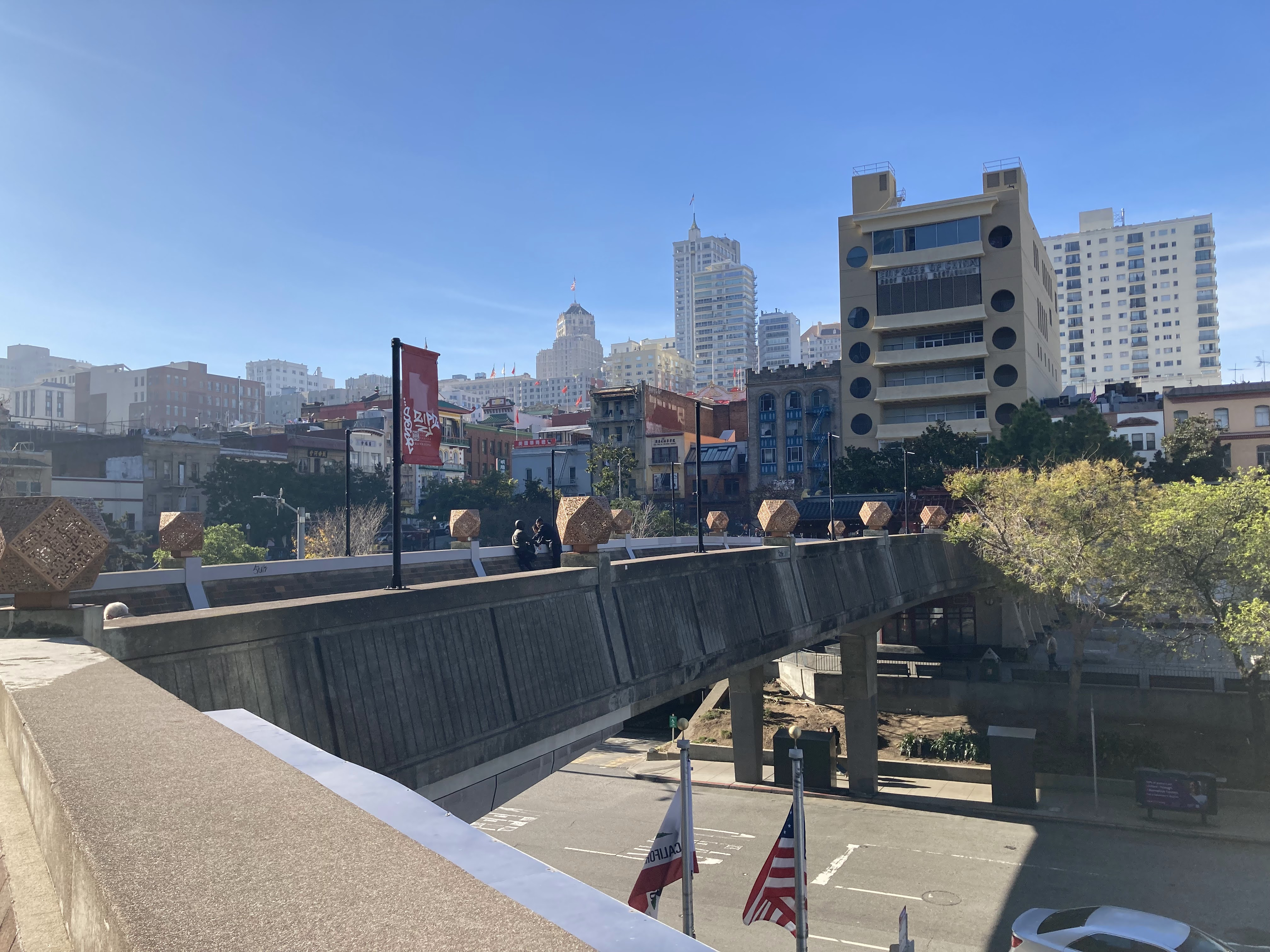
Looking west on the bridge from the Chinese Culture Center

A redesign of the bridge was announced in 2015, and it was stated that public access would be increased and new benches and planters would be built on the bridge. However, this plan was not realized.

In 2016, the City of San Francisco officially dedicated the bridge in honor of Chinatown philanthropists Rolland and Kathryn Lowe, proclaiming the bridge the "Dr. Rolland and Kathryn Community Bridge."

=== Demolition ===
In 2014, the San Francisco Recreation & Parks Department conducted a feasibility study for redesigning and upgrading Portsmouth Square. Designs were drawn up, and in 2021 it was publicly announced that the bridge would be removed as part of the redesign. It was estimated that it would cost $2.1 million project to dismantle the bridge. The permit with the city states that it would be the Hilton Hotel's responsibility to remove the bridge. David Gonzalez, president of the hotel's owner Portsmouth Square Inc., said that the hotel did not want to pay to demolish the bridge.

A survey found that 77% of residents of Chinatown never use the bridge, and some people have said that the Hilton hotel sometimes treats it like a private space, rather than public, and closes it on Sundays and during private dining events. As such, many Chinatown residents support the removal of the bridge, but some people oppose it, including skateboarders and appreciators of Brutalist architecture. Sam Kwong, a local architect, also opposes the demolition as he says removing it will create bad feng shui. Meanwhile, better pedestrian access for that block is necessary as the street intersections on either side of the bridge are some of the most dangerous for pedestrians.

In January 2023, renderings of the redesign of the area without the bridge were publicly revealed. They showed a small section of the bridge connected to the hotel will remain which will continue to form a porte cochere and offer a balcony for the hotel.

In June 2025, it was reported that due to the tariffs in the second Trump administration, the Portsmouth Square redesign project would be delayed. The tariffs created high inflation, particularly on construction costs, which resulted in the bids for the project exceeding the originally cited costs by over $10 million. The city will do another bidding process and will delay groundbreaking until at least spring 2026, so the bridge will not be demolished until after initially scheduled.

The bridge was demolished on the weekend of August 1–2, 2026.

== Design ==
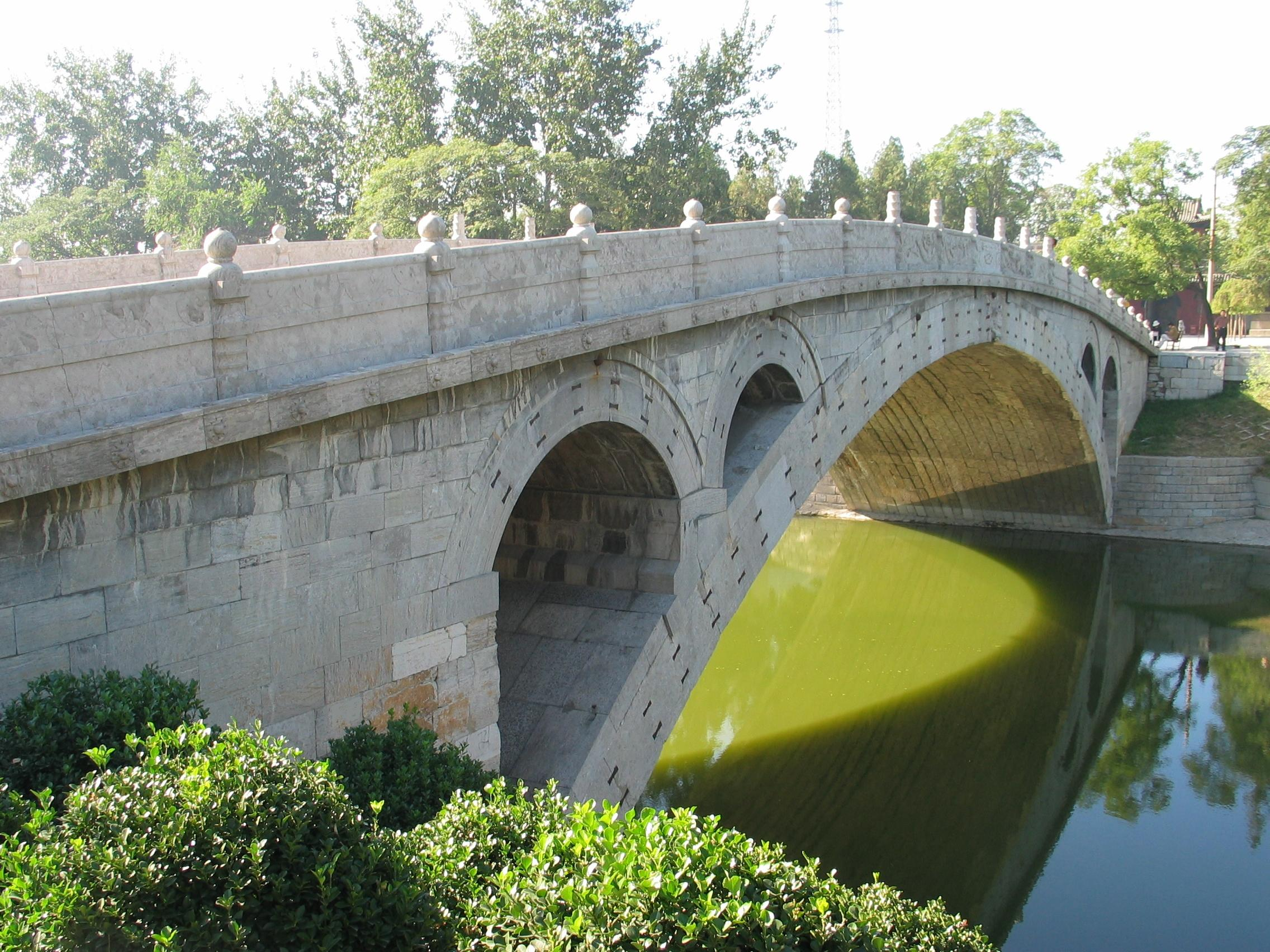
The Anji Bridge in Zhao County in Hebei Province, China is said to be an inspiration for the pedestrian bridge.

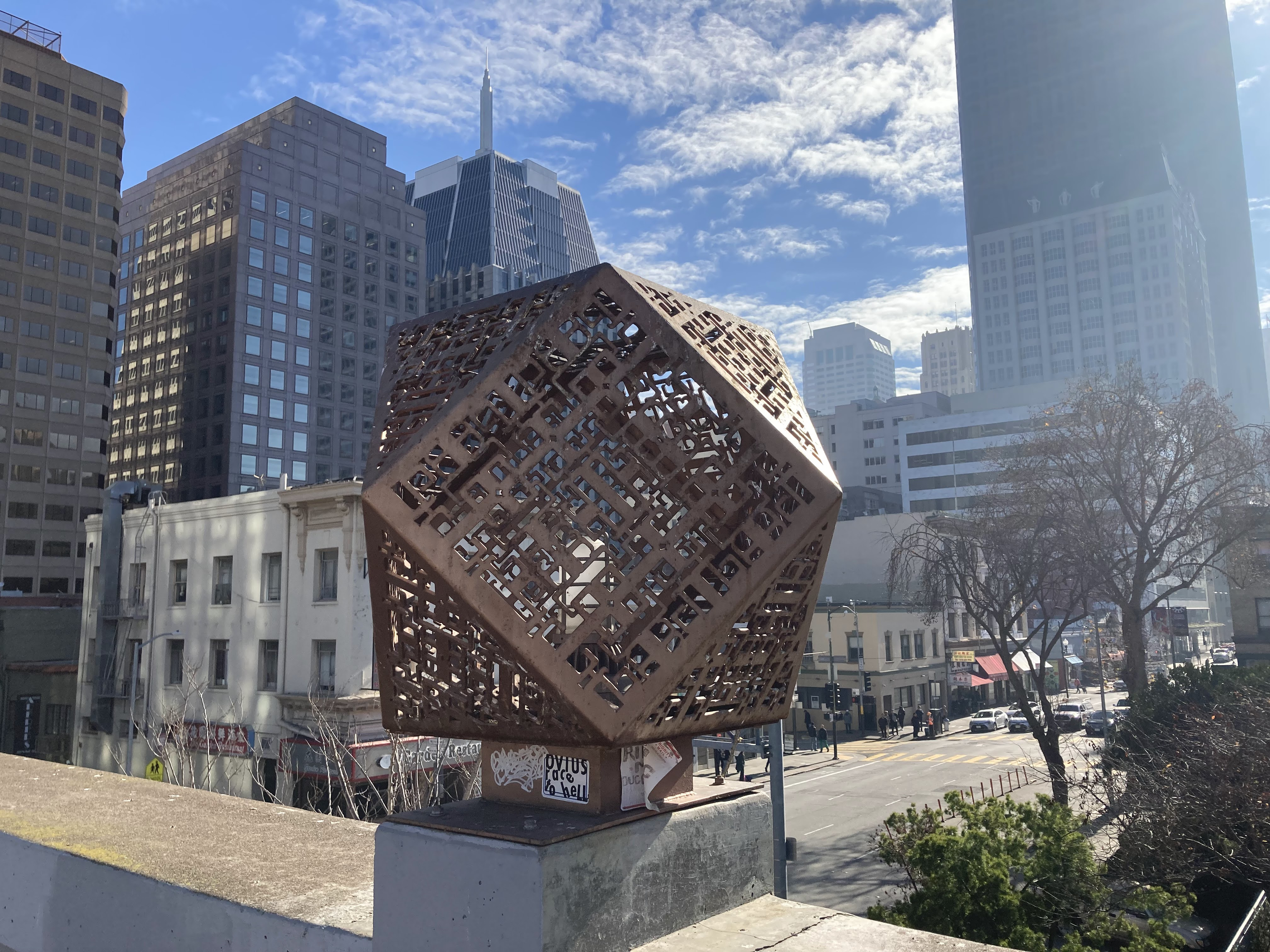
Lights line the bridge.

It was 28 feet (8.5 m) wide and was a dominant feature of the square. The bridge was a project of the San Francisco Redevelopment Agency. At 240 feet (73 m) long and made from concrete and brick, the bridge represented a stylistic extension of the Hilton Hotel that it spaned to, both of which fit into Brutalist architecture. Across it were lights that are enclosed in bronze geometric shapes that depict Chinese symbols and are meant to bring to mind chinese lanterns.

The hotel was designed by Chinese American architect Clement Chen and John Carl Warnecke and Associates, and the bridge was originally going to be two levels and incorporated into the design. However, by late 1967, the double-decker bridge concept was discarded in favor of a single level bridge. The design of the bridge was done by American landscape architect Robert Royston and Taiwanese architect Chen Chi-kwan. Clement Chen later stated the bridge design was inspired by the Anji Bridge. On the east end of the bridge are two sets of stairs leading up to the third floor of the hotel. The bridge created a porte cochere.

One problem of the bridge was the shadows it casts. This problem was noted in the original designs, which required moving the previously existing playground.

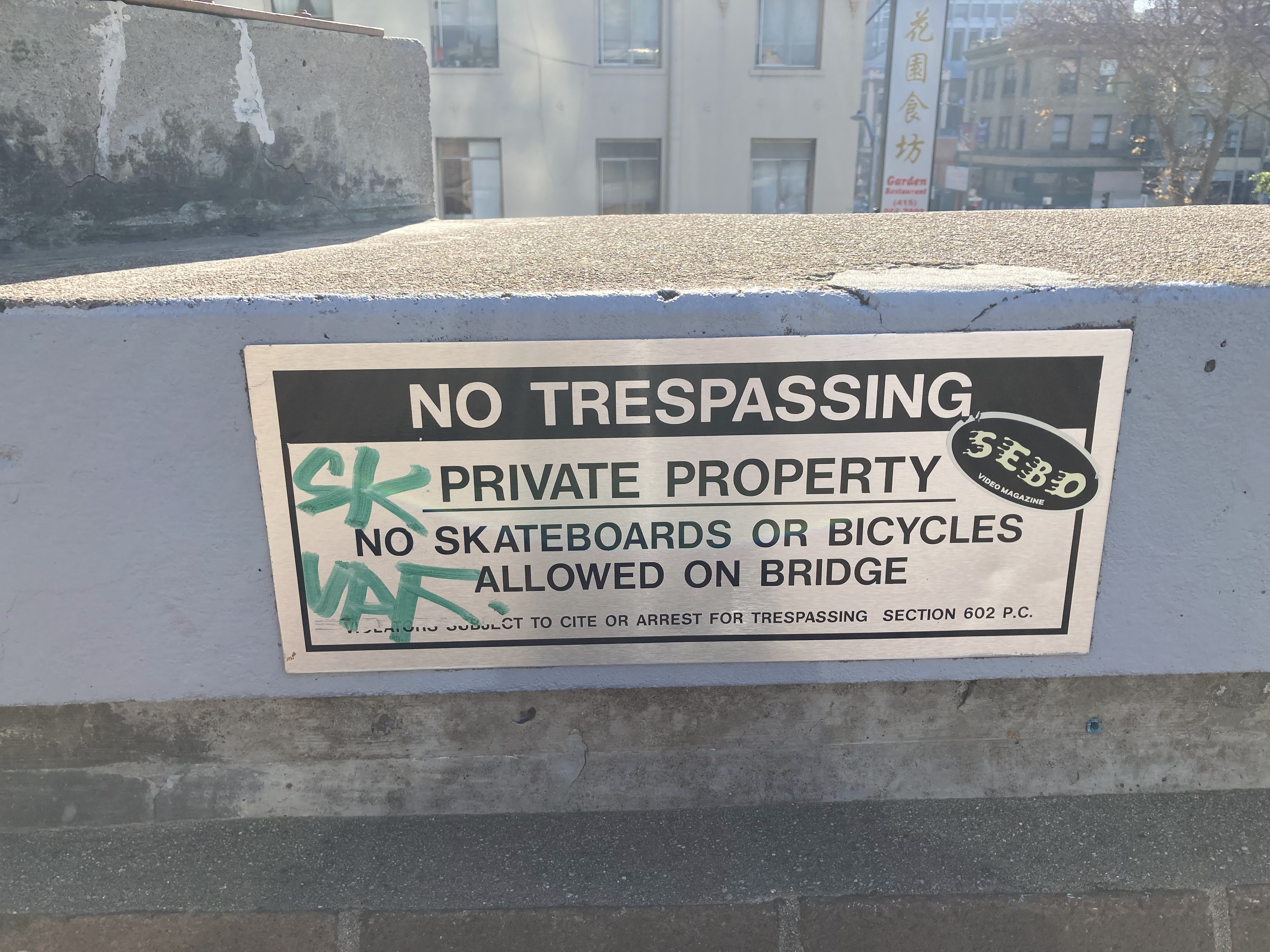
Sign warning against trespassing or skateboarding on the bridge

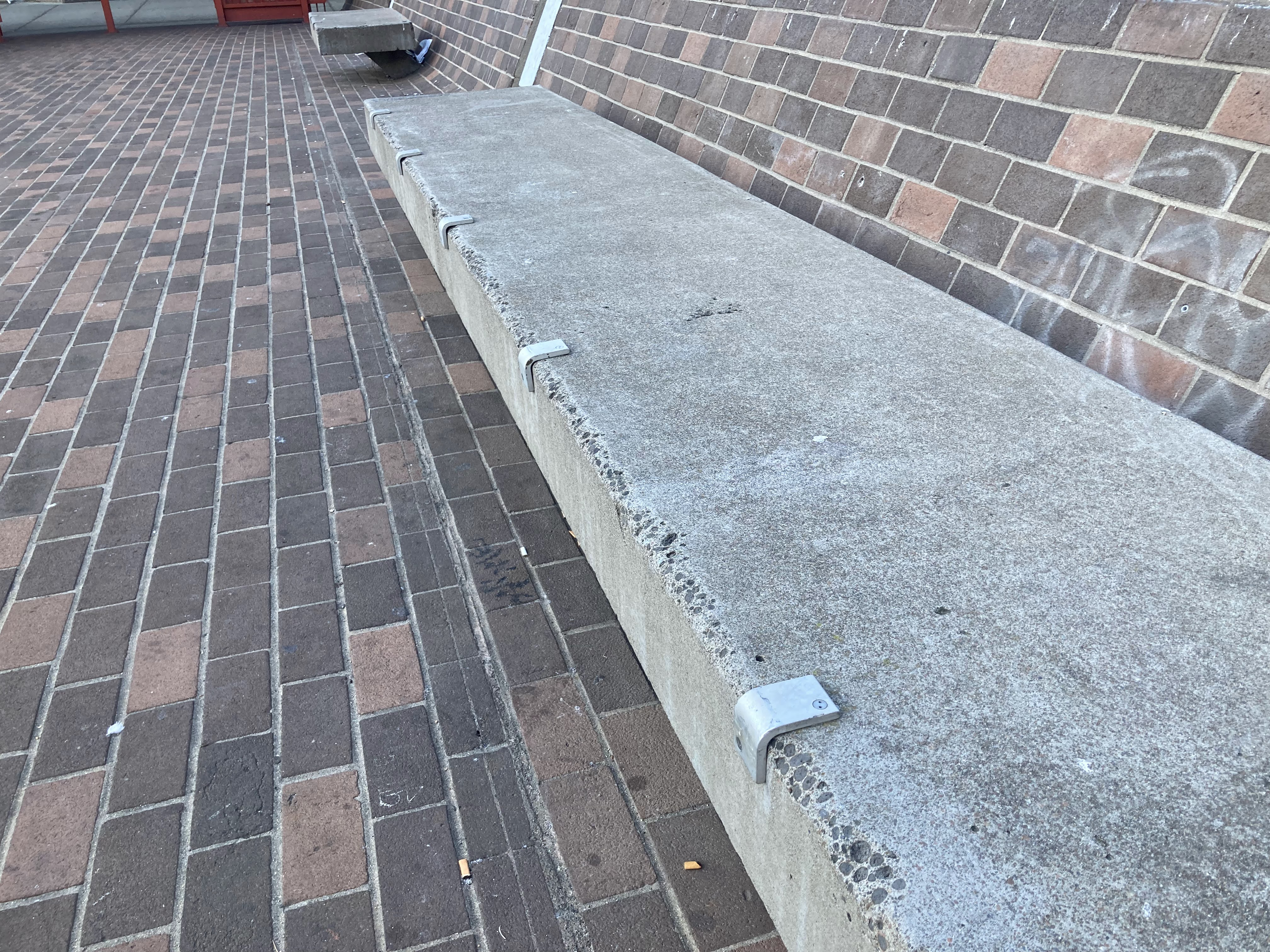
Skate stoppers were installed on the benches in the 1990s.

No major renovations had been done to the bridge itself since its erection. However, several minor changes had been made. For example, a metal gate was built on the west end of bridge in 2003 at a cost of $5,000 to allow the Hilton to restrict public access when desired. In July 2014, a permit was requested and granted by the city to erect four flagpoles on the east side of the bridge outside the Chinese Culture Center. In response to skateboarders using the bridge, hostile architectural elements were installed, such as skatestoppers on the benches, and an additional railing on the ramp part of the staircase.

Portsmouth Square was evaluated in 2019 for inclusion in the California Register of Historical Resources, during which the bridge was also determined to be eligible for historic designation on its own. The evaluation stated that the bridge was a "character defining feature" of the block.

== Use ==
=== Skate spot ===
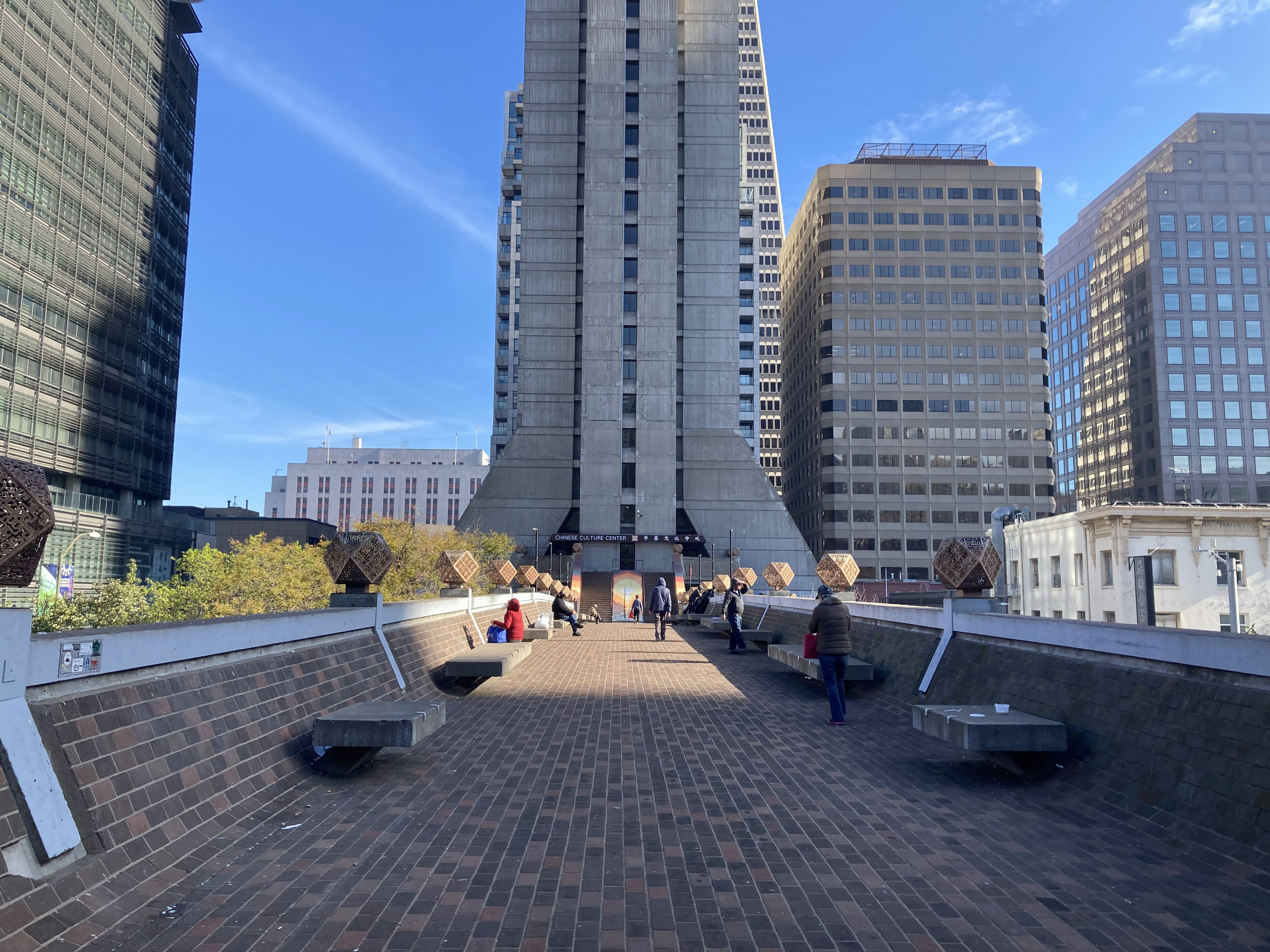
The banked sides and benches are frequently used by skateboarders.

Not long after it was built, the bridge became a local skate spot. Thrasher Skateboard Magazine documented it in the 2022 film The Story of China Banks. In it, Mike "Arco" Archimedes discusses the "discovery" of the site in 1979. The skate spot is one of the most famous in the world and has been called "iconic", a "San Francisco staple", "skate mecca", and skateboarding's "most hallowed ground." It is also used by freestyle BMX riders. For example, Danny MacAskill filmed a portion of a Red Bull video on the bridge in 2022. In addition to other local skate spots, such as EMB, the spot is considered among the most important in the development of modern street skating in the 1990s.

The skate spot has been featured in many skate videos, such as the influential The Search for Animal Chin, which featured Bones Brigade members including Tony Hawk skating on the bridge. The first time the bridge was included in a skate video was Thrasher Magazine's Blast from the Past and Present in 1986. Many popular skate stunts have been performed there, including Joe Valdez doing an ollie on the ledge of the bridge over the street below, a 35-foot drop, in 2014. Finnish Olympic skateboarder Jarne Verbruggen skated the site. The cover of the December 2021 edition of Thrasher Magazine was a photo of skateboarder Tristan Funkhouser ollieing over the largest bench on the bridge.

In response to skateboarders using the bridge, security and police presence was stepped up in the 90s and hostile architectural elements were installed. According to The Story of China Banks, skateboarders were initially deterred a little by this, but eventually continued to use the site.

==== Influence ====
The location has inspired a new skate feature, called "China banks," which is a sloped quarter pipe-like bank with ledges in front and is featured at a number of skateparks and skate competitions around the world, including skateparks in Eveleigh, New South Wales, Australia, Tampa, Florida, Los Angeles, Scantlebury Skate Park in New Haven, Connecticut, Bangkok, Thailand, Solana Beach, California, Marrakesh, Morocco, and others. Skate company Vans opened a skatepark and event center in Chicago, Illinois called the House of Vans which has a replica of the bridge, and other famous skate spots. A popular skate spot in New York's Chinatown also has a similar feature and is called China Banks in reference to this one. When Thrasher opened their brick-and-mortar store on 6th Street, it was meant to partly serve as a commemoration to the history and culture of skateboarding in San Francisco; as part of that, it featured photos and clothing featuring China Banks. Duncan McDuie-Ra, a professor of Urban Sociology at The University of Newcastle, has published books on famous skate spots and has documented China Banks.

==== In video games ====
The site's importance in skateboarding led to its inclusion as a virtual location in skateboarding video games. Tony Hawk's Pro Skater had a level of San Francisco which featured the bridge. The bridge is a location in the skateboarding video game Session: Skate Sim.

=== Community use ===
The Hilton hotel sometimes uses it for private events. It also sees occasional public community use as an extension of Portsmouth Square, Chinatown's "living room." Festivities have been held on the bridge during the annual Chinese New Year Festival. The Portsmouth Square Clubhouse, a community room connected beneath the bridge, is rarely used.

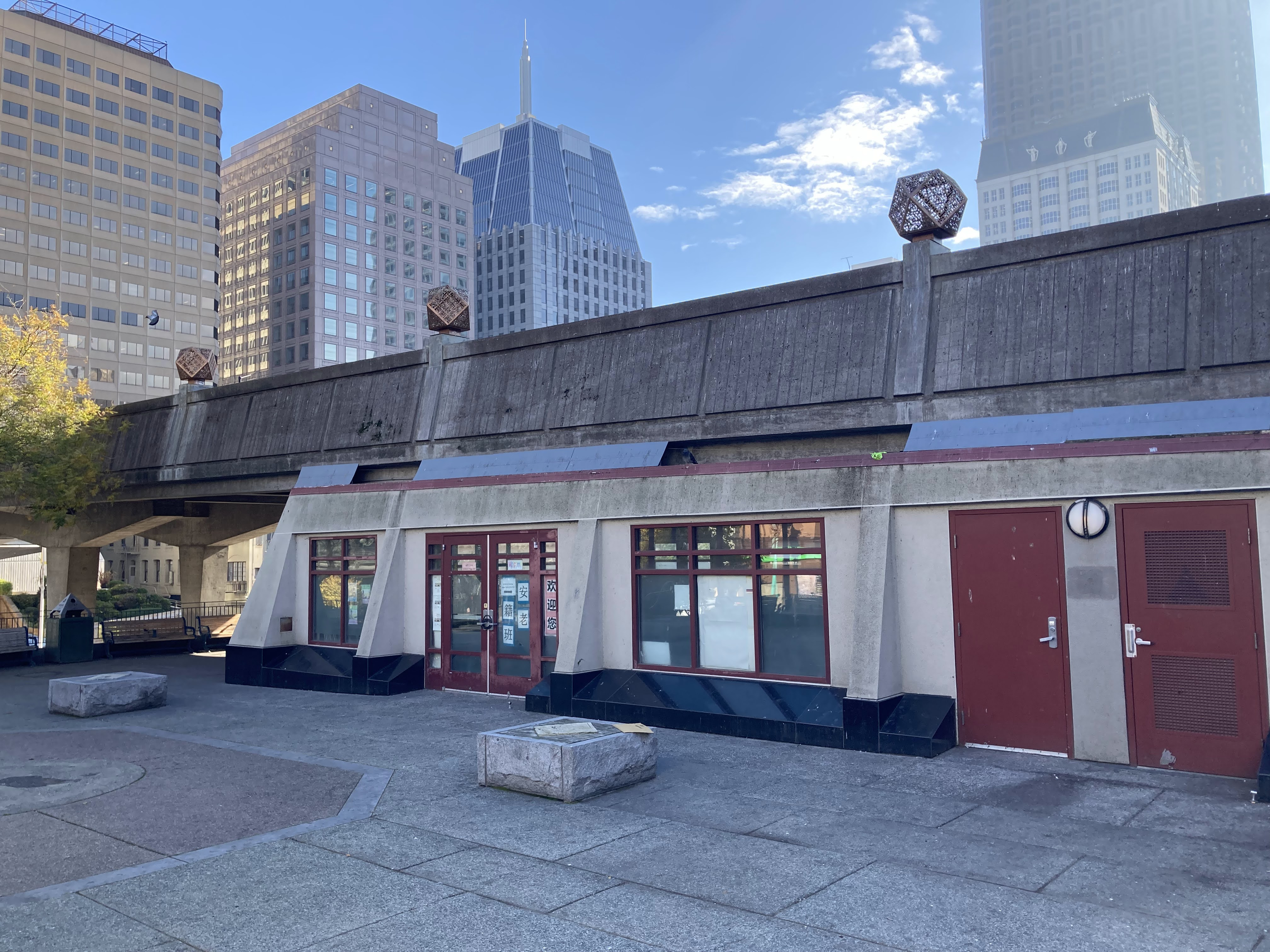
The Portsmouth Square Clubhouse on the west side of the bridge is dark and damp inside with no ventilation. As such, it sees little use. The redesign of the square would create a new, larger, more useable clubhouse in its place.

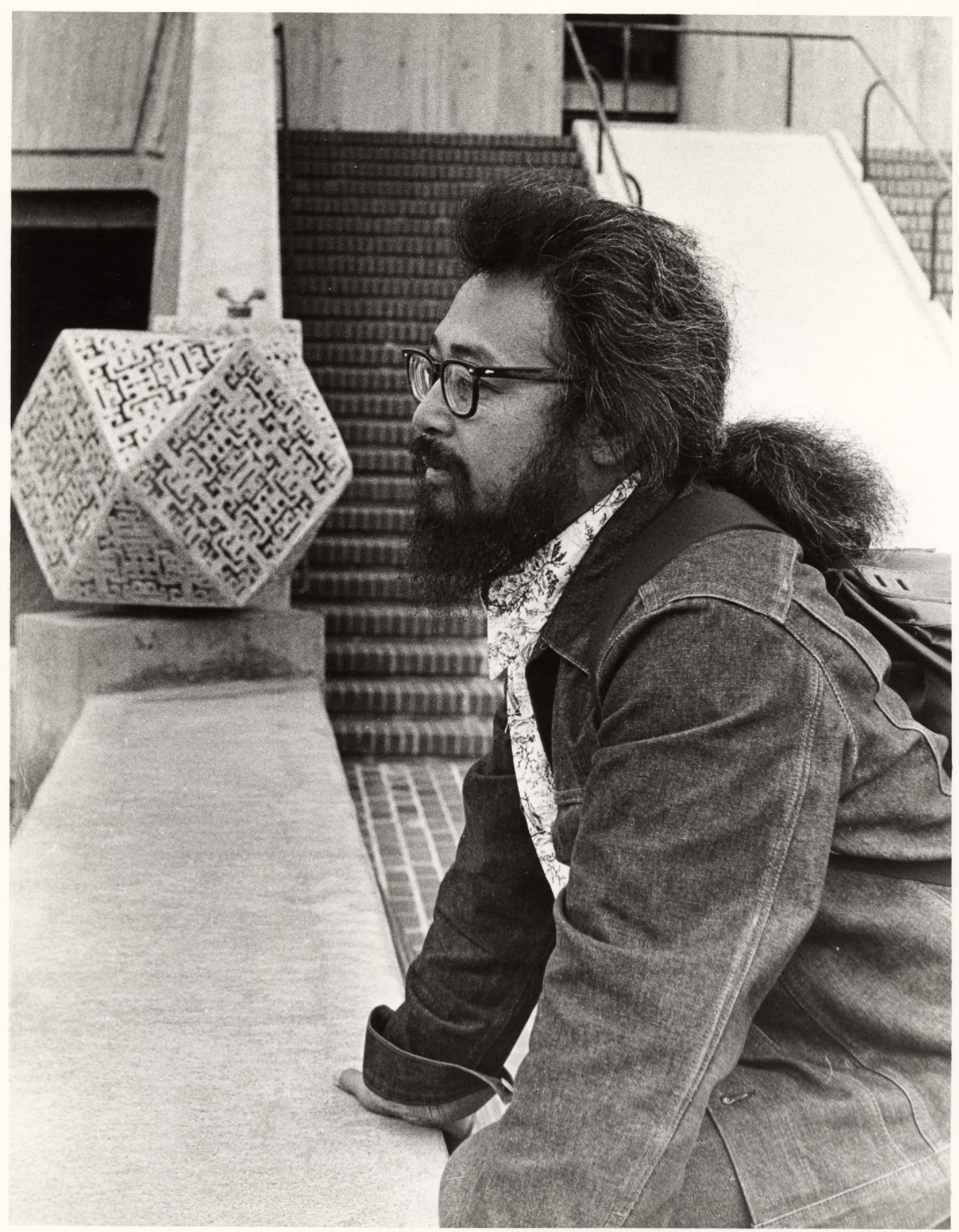
Filipino-American poet and housing advocate Al Robles standing on the bridge in 1975

In May 2025, local community groups organized one of the world's first Chinatown Pride Festivals which included a procession from Grant Street to Portsmouth Square and a celebration on the bridge.

=== As an art space ===
The Chinese Culture Center began having temporary projects and performances on the bridge in the 2000s.

In 2015, an art exhibit was installed on the bridge called Sky Bridge. It consisted of reflective mylar on the bricks.

Along the stairs on the east side of the bridge, a mosaic titled Sunrise by artist Mik Gaspay was created and officially debuted in 2016. It is still on display today.
