= Michael Lawrence Brown =

American judge (born 1968)

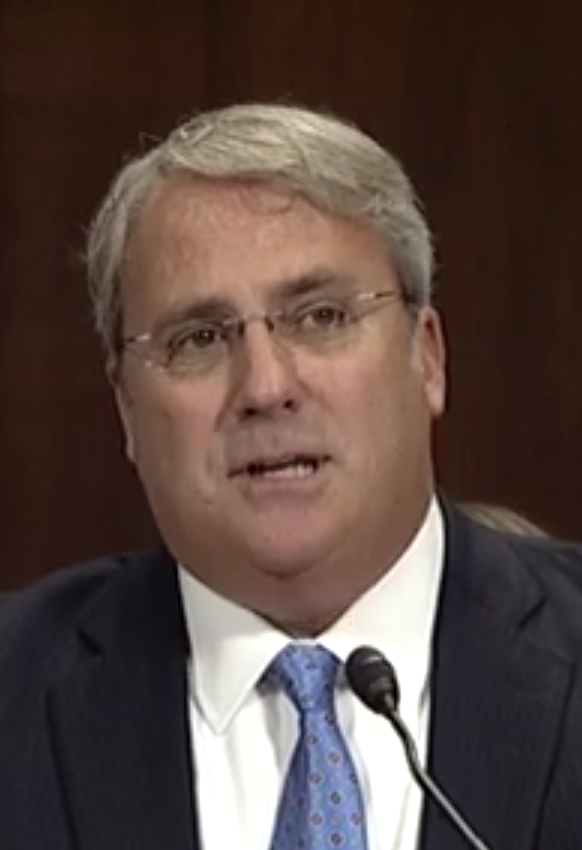

Judge of the United States District Court for the Northern District of Georgia
- Incumbent
- Assumed office January 17, 2018
- Appointed by: Donald Trump
- Preceded by: Julie E. Carnes

Personal details
- Born: Michael Lawrence Brown; October 10, 1968 (age 56); Quantico, Virginia, U.S.
- Education: Georgetown University (BA); University of Georgia (JD)

Michael Lawrence Brown (born October 10, 1968) is a United States district judge of the United States District Court for the Northern District of Georgia.

== Biography ==
He received his Bachelor of Arts from Georgetown University, and his Juris Doctor, magna cum laude, from the University of Georgia School of Law, where he was inducted into the Order of the Coif and served on the editorial board and the managerial board of the Georgia Law Review. From 1992 to 1993 he was a summer associate with the law firms of Nelson Mullins Riley & Scarborough and King & Spalding. He started his legal career as a law clerk for Judge James Larry Edmondson of the United States Court of Appeals for the Eleventh Circuit in Atlanta. Brown spent four years as a litigation associate in the Atlanta office of King & Spalding LLP. Prior to his career in private practice, he served for six years as an Assistant United States Attorney in the Northern District of Georgia and in the Southern District of Florida, where he tried more than twenty-five cases and argued criminal appeals. Before becoming a judge, Brown served as an equity partner and co-chair of the White Collar and Government Investigations practice group in the Atlanta office of Alston & Bird LLP.

== Federal judicial service ==
On July 13, 2017, President Donald Trump nominated Brown to serve as a United States District Judge of the United States District Court for the Northern District of Georgia, to the seat vacated by Judge Julie E. Carnes, who was elevated to the United States Court of Appeals for the Eleventh Circuit on July 31, 2014. On September 20, 2017, a hearing on his nomination was held before the Senate Judiciary Committee. On October 19, 2017, his nomination was reported out of committee by a voice vote. On January 10, 2018, the United States Senate invoked cloture on his nomination by a 97–1 vote. On January 11, 2018, his nomination was confirmed by a 92–0 vote. He received his judicial commission on January 17, 2018.

Legal offices
Preceded by Julie E. Carnes	Judge of the United States District Court for the Northern District of Georgia; 2018–present	Incumbent
