= Chen Chi-kwan =

Taiwanese artist, architect, and educator

- 陳其寬
- Born: 1921; Beijing, China
- Died: 2007 (age 85–86); Burlingame, California, United States
- Other names: Qikuan Chen, Chi-Kwan Chen
- Education: National Central University; University of Illinois Urbana-Champaign; University of California, Los Angeles; Harvard University
- Occupations: architect, painter, professor
- Known for: Luce Memorial Chapel
- Awards: National Award for Arts

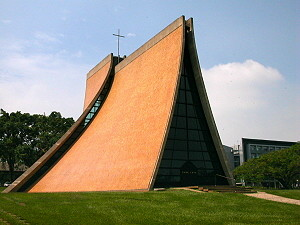
Luce Memorial Chapel

Chen Chi-kwan (Chinese: 陳其寬; 1921–2007) was a Taiwanese artist, architect, and educator, particularly for his paintings and architectural work for Tunghai University. He collaborated with I.M. Pei to design the Luce Memorial Chapel on the university campus, a hallmark of mid-century modernist architecture completed in 1963.

== Biography ==
Born in 1921 in Beijing (then known as Beiping), China. He attended Nanjing secondary school, Zhenjiang secondary school, and Zhongnan Middle School, National II. Chen's youth was strongly affected by the Second Sino-Japanese War and his family relocated in Chongqing, Sichuan Province. He studied architecture at the Southeast University School of Architecture (then known as Central University) and graduated with a BS degree in 1944.

In 1944, he served as an interpreter in the China-Burma-India Theater of World War II. In 1946, he served as a designer at Nanjing Jitai Architects. Chi-kwan studied at the University of Illinois from 1949 to 1951 with Walter Gropius and Architects Collaborative, graduating in 1949 with a M.A. degree in Architecture. In 1950, he took classes at University of California, Los Angeles (UCLA) in the Department of Art. Walter Gropius, recommended him as a part-time teacher at the Massachusetts Institute of Technology (MIT), where he taught from 1952 until 1954.

In collaboration with I. M. Pei, co-designed Tunghai University campus, Taiwan in 1954. He served as director for the Department of Architecture at Tunghai University in 1960.

Chi-kwan was involved in the design of the Portsmouth Square pedestrian bridge in Chinatown, San Francisco.

Chi-kwan often painted in watercolor, borrowing elements from traditional Chinese painting and applying them modern themes or Western style line work. Many of his works were abstract or depicted small landscapes. His paintings are in the permanent collection at various museums including Smithsonian American Art Museum, Harvard Art Museums, the British Museum, among others.

In 2004, Chen was one of the recipients of Taiwan's prestigious National Award for Arts. Judges said the "decorative colors, architectural lines and mystical spaces" in his paintings "inspired us to see our surroundings in a new light." To commemorate the 90th anniversary of his birth, a selection of Chen's paintings were displayed at the National Palace Museum in Taipei.

He died in 2007 in Burlingame, California.

In 2007, an asteroid, 236851 Chenchikwan, was named in honor of Chen by its discoverers, C.S. Lin and Q.Z. Ye.

== Key dates ==
- 1969, planned the overall design of the campus of the National Central University in Chungli.
- 1980, appointed Dean of Engineering at Ren Donghai University.
