= Hall of Justice (San Francisco) =

Thomas J. Cahill Hall of Justice
- Aerial view of the San Francisco Hall of Justice complex. View facing northwest, with Bryant Street in the foreground and I-80 in the background.
- Interactive map of the Thomas J. Cahill Hall of Justice area
- Alternative names: 850 Bryant; The Hall

General information
- Location: 850 Bryant St
- Coordinates: 37.77544°N 122.40394°W
- Construction started: September 11, 1958
- Completed: 1960
- Owner: City of San Francisco

Technical details
- Material: granite-clad reinforced concrete
- Floor count: 7

Design and construction
- Architecture firm: Weihe, Frick, & Kruse
- Structural engineer: Hall, Pregnoff & Matheu

Renovating team
- Renovating firm: John Carl Warnecke & Associates (1979 Coroner's Office extension); San Francisco Bureau of Architecture (1985 Rooftop gymnasium)
- Engineer: Donald Bentley & Associates (1979); Nishkian, Hamill & Associates (1979); Shapiro, Okino, Hom & Associates (1985)

The Thomas J. Cahill Hall of Justice in San Francisco is the third building to serve as the headquarters of the San Francisco Police Department and San Francisco County Superior Court. It was constructed between 1958 and 1960, in the block bounded by Sixth, Seventh, and Bryant.

== History ==
Hall of Justice (1900)

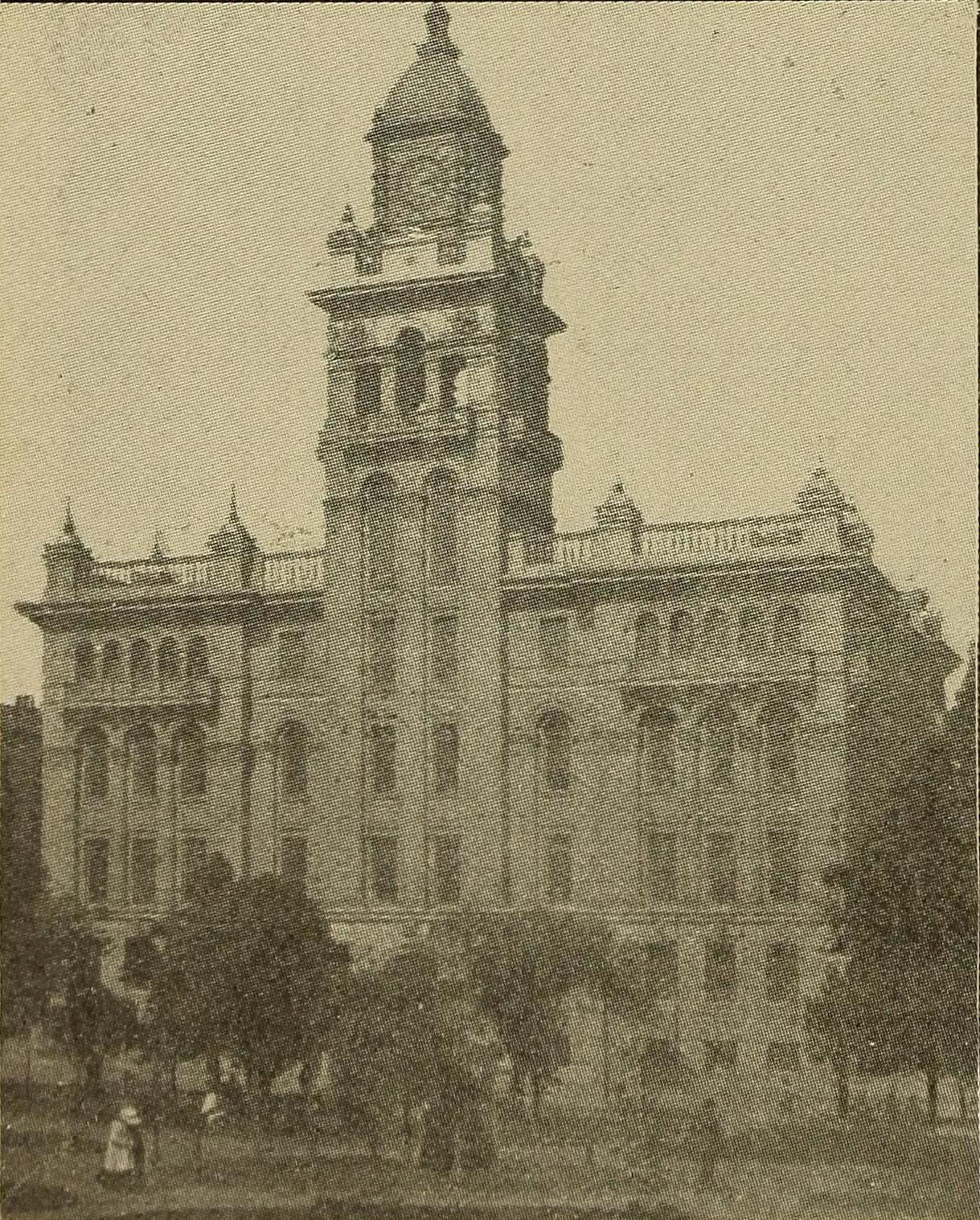
Before

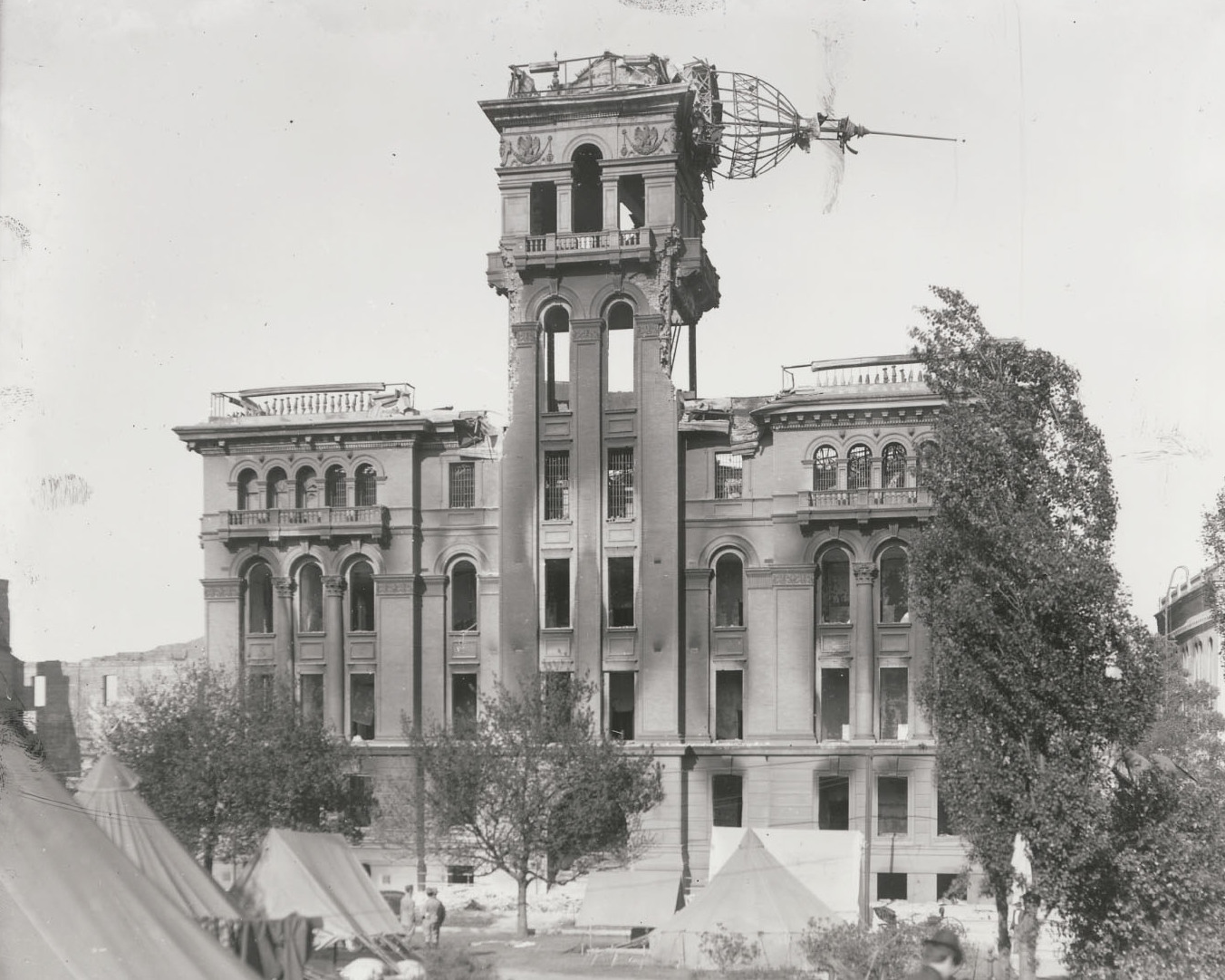
After

Before and after the 1906 San Francisco earthquake

The first Hall of Justice (1900–06) was opposite Portsmouth Square, at the southeast corner of Kearny and Washington, occupying a building originally built in 1851 as the Jenny Lind Theatre and purchased by the city in 1852 for use as the City Hall. While a new City Hall was being constructed between 1872 and 1899 at Civic Center, the old Jenny Lind building was rebuilt as the Hall of Justice; the cornerstone was laid on December 19, 1896. By 1898, the editors of the San Francisco Call derided the slow pace of work as "The Haul of Justice", concluding the contractor had underbid the job and was intent on delaying the completion by ordering numerous changes; a grand jury would later ask Mayor James D. Phelan and the San Francisco Board of Supervisors to "grant no further extension" of the contractors after October 1 of that year. Also that year, when bubonic plague broke out in neighboring Chinatown, residents there blamed the tall tower of the Hall of Justice, which they claimed "had aroused the evils of the air". Work was completed in 1900 and the first official business was conducted there on September 19, although the upper floor jail remained unfinished; despite this, the Call wrote "the building is the best San Francisco ever had in its history". It was heavily damaged following the April 1906 San Francisco earthquake and fire.

The second Hall of Justice (1912–61) was rebuilt at the same site to a design by city architect Newton J. Tharp. Tharp's drawings were approved by the Board of Police commissioners on March 5, 1909, and construction on the second Hall was completed in 1912. The half-circle, fan-shaped windows on the fourth floor appear in numerous police dramas such as The Lineup in the 1950s and Ironside, the American television program starring Raymond Burr, in the 1960s. The San Francisco Hall of Justice is also frequently mentioned in the works of Dashiell Hammett and James Patterson. It was demolished in 1968. After the third Hall of Justice was completed in 1960, operations moved there and the old Hall of Justice was demolished in 1968; a hotel, the Hilton San Francisco Financial District, was completed in 1971 and currently stands on this site.

The current Hall of Justice at 850–880 Bryant Street served as the San Francisco Police Department's operational headquarters until 2015. It is internally referred to as "850 Bryant" and "the hall". The complex serves as the main San Francisco County Jail, as well as base of operations and headquarters for the San Francisco Sheriff's Department, and garage for the majority of vehicles for the SFPD. The San Francisco Police motorcycle traffic division is completely based there as well. In 1994 the Hall was renamed for Thomas J. Cahill, the Chief of the SFPD from 1958 to 1970.

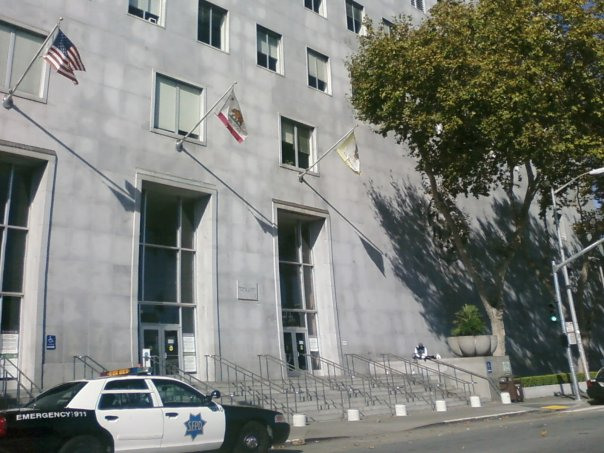
Front of the San Francisco Hall Of Justice.

The San Francisco Hall of Justice housed Jail #3 and Jail #4 for the San Francisco County Superior Court criminal division. County Jail #4, on the 7th floor, closed September 5, 2020. The Hall of Justice formerly served as the location of the Office of the Chief Medical Examiner and city morgue; those offices moved to a new facility in the city's Bayview district in November 2017.
