= Kearny Street =

Street in San Francisco

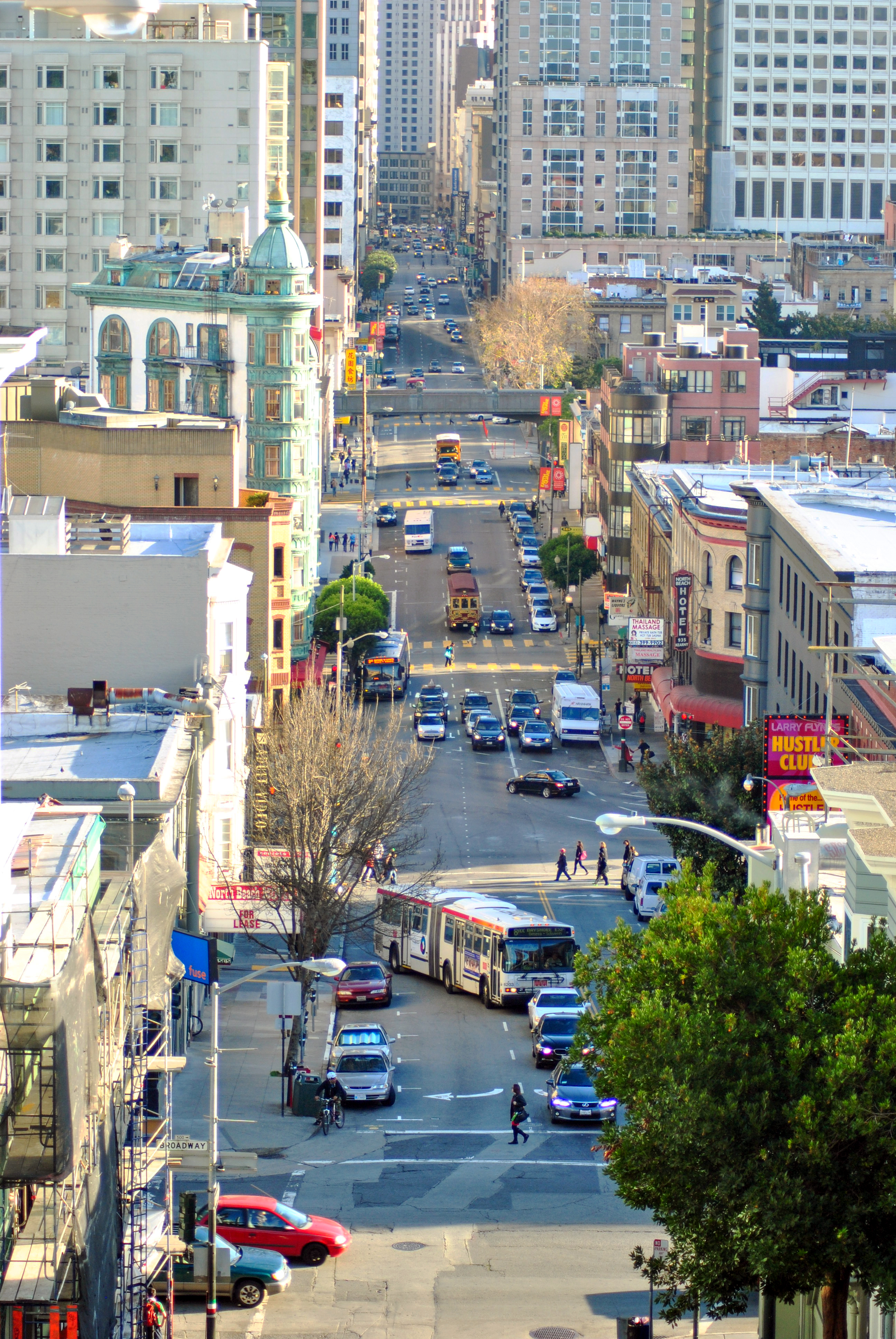
- Kearny Street as seen from Telegraph Hill toward the South
- Interactive map of Kearny Street
- Location: San Francisco, California
- South end: Market Street in Union Square
- North end: The Embarcadero

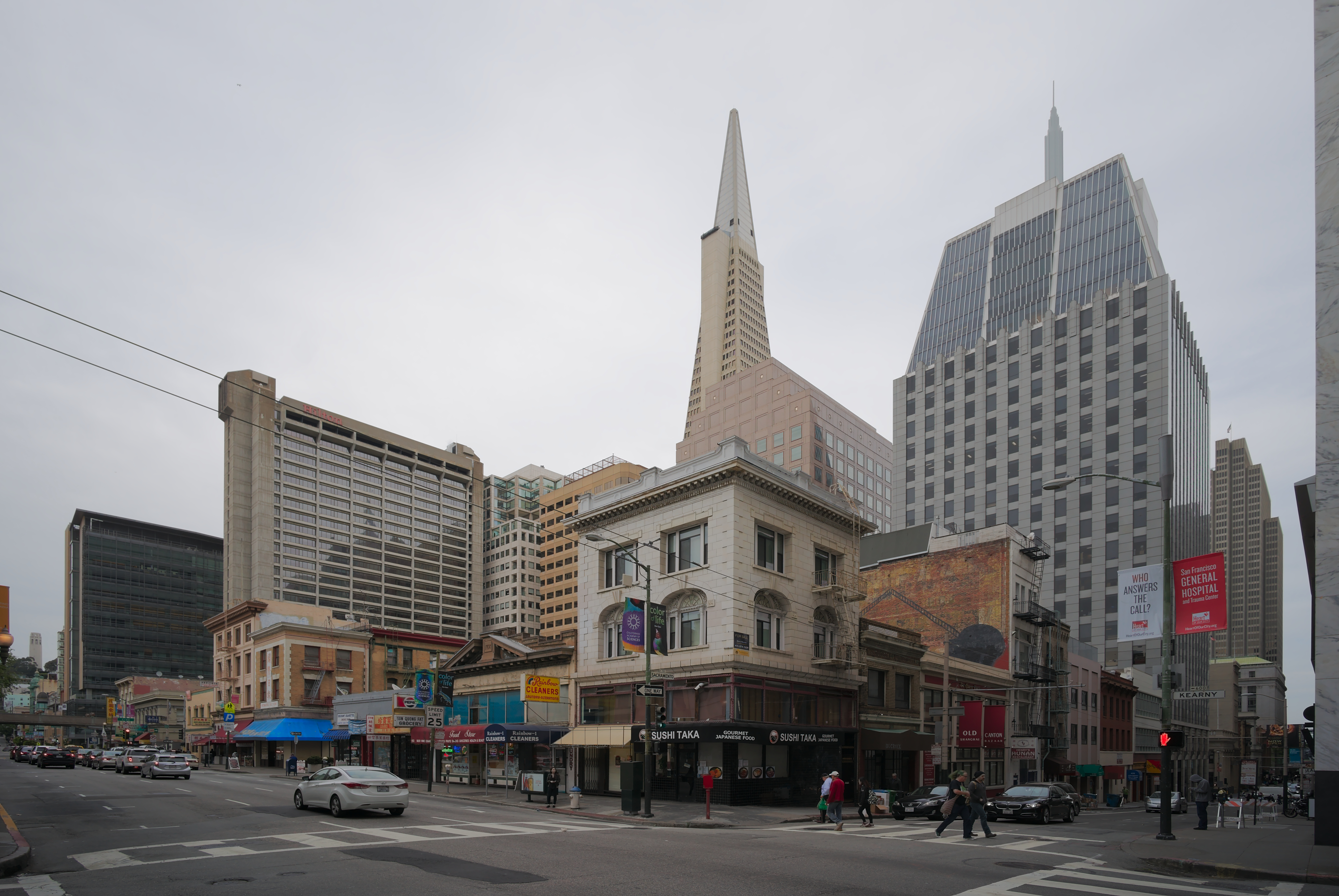
Corner of Kearny and Sacramento (with the Transamerica Pyramid and other Montgomery Street buildings in the background)

Kearny Street (/ˈkərni/) in San Francisco, California, runs north from Market Street to The Embarcadero. Toward its south end, it separates the Financial District from the Union Square and Chinatown districts. Further north, it passes over Telegraph Hill, interrupted by several gaps near Coit Tower due to the steep terrain.

== History ==
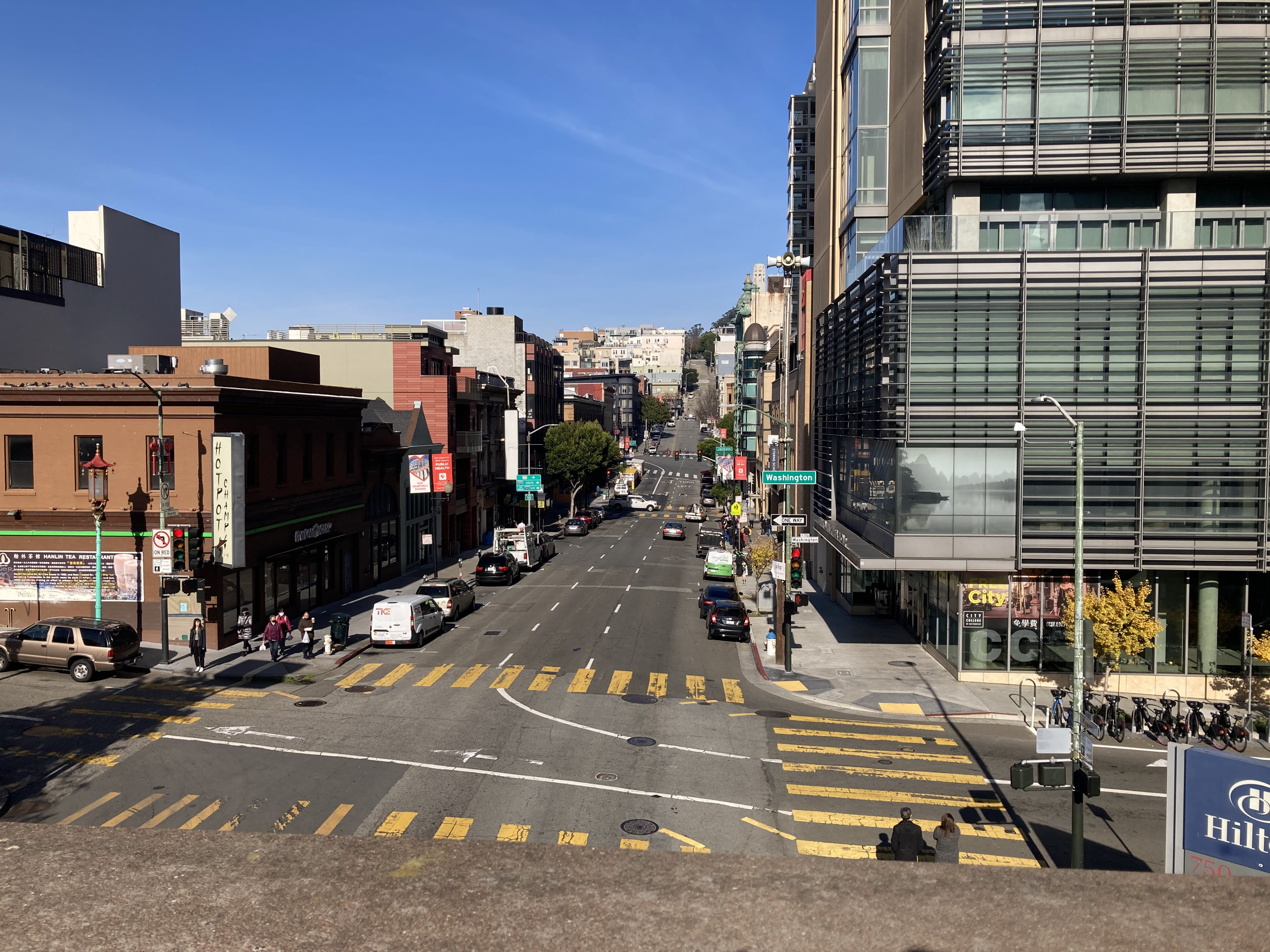
Looking north on Kearny Street from the Portsmouth Square pedestrian bridge. The north side of Kearny becomes the Peter Macchiarini Steps once it gets to Telegraph Hill and then continues, interrupted over the hill.

Kearny Street was originally named "La Calle de la Fundacion" by the Spanish, meaning "street of the founding". The origin of the present name, Kearny Street, is generally assumed to be Stephen Watts Kearny, the first military governor of California under U.S. rule. Another possible namesake is General Philip Kearny. It is sometimes erroneously assumed to be named after the (differently spelled) labor leader Denis Kearney, known for his racist anti-Chinese agitation.

At Kearny and Clay was the lower end of the first cable car line in America, launched by Andrew S. Hallidie on August 2, 1873, climbing five blocks up Clay Street hill toward Nob Hill.

During the early 20th century, "running north from Market Street to the Barbary Coast, Kearny Street was an avenue of honky-tonks and saloons frequented by racetrack tipsters and other shady professionals. On election nights it was the scene of torch-light parades and brass bands", as summarized in the 1940 WPA guide to San Francisco.

From the turn of the twentieth century until 1977, the area around the intersection of Kearny and Jackson Streets was home to a large Filipino population, and earned the nickname Manilatown. Located at 848 Kearny Street, the International Hotel served as the heart of Manilatown. In its heyday of the 1920s and 1930s the estimated population of Manilatown was between 20,000 and 40,000 people. In 1968 the hotel was sold to developers intending to replace it with more profitable commercial property. After a protracted court battle, the remaining two hundred odd tenants were forcibly evicted on 4 August 1977. The hotel and other buildings to the south of it on that block were quickly torn down, after which the land lay vacant for over a quarter of a century. On 27 July 2004, a two block stretch of Kearny Street was officially declared to be Manilatown.

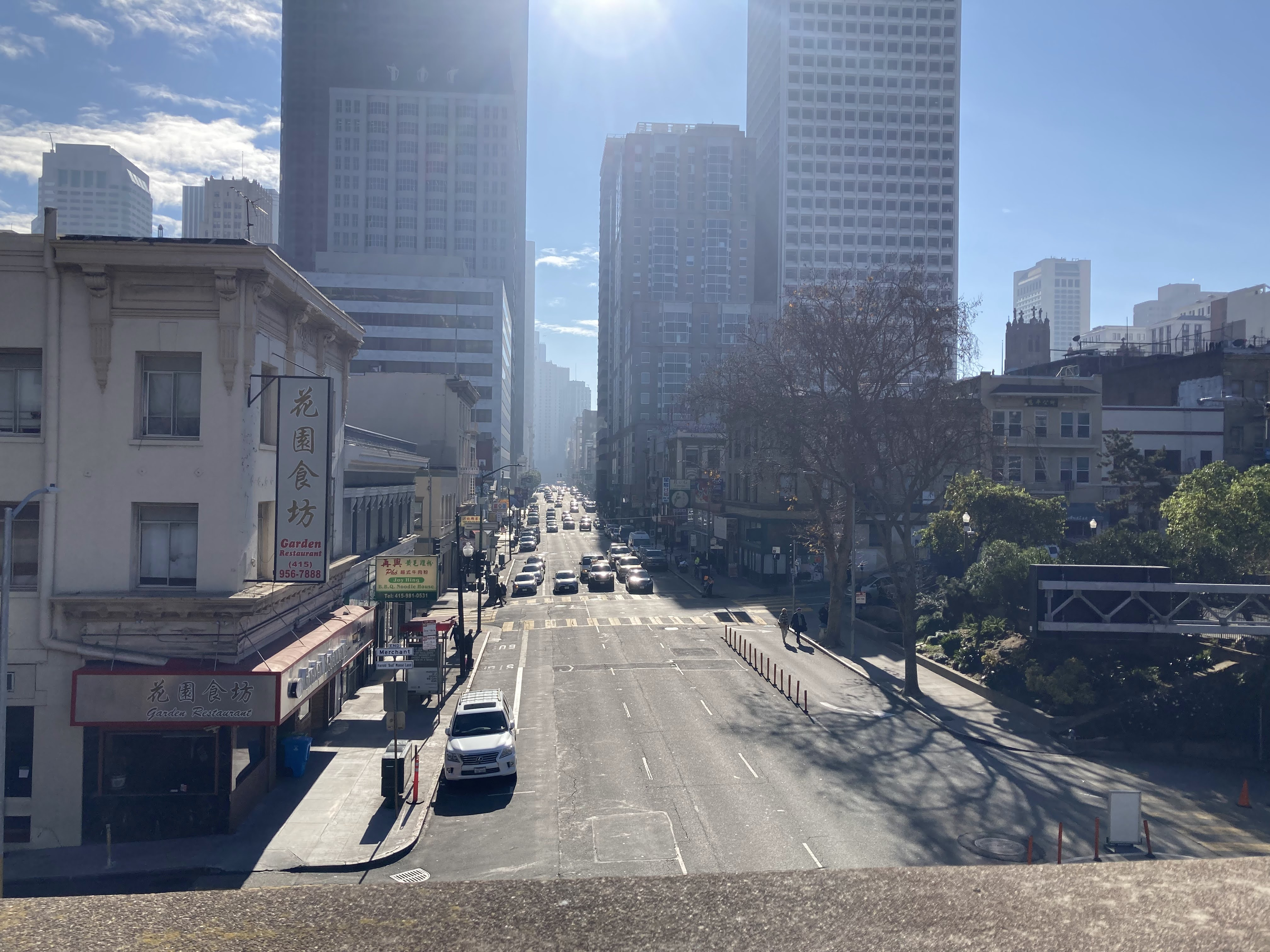
Kearny Street seen from looking south on the Portsmouth Square pedestrian bridge.

The San Francisco Chronicle's urban design critic John King observed in 2006 that while Kearny Street's "architectural mish-mash" includes a number of skyscrapers, "several blocks survive ramshackle and low, delightful blurs of pre-World War II architecture that mix their styles but maintain sturdy-looking masonry facades [...] These low blocks exist because of city efforts in the 1970s and '80s to preserve older buildings and keep the Financial District from devouring everything around it. That protective foresight is what good planning is all about."

== Landmarks ==
Landmarks along Kearny Street include Lotta's Fountain at Market Street, where 1906 earthquake commemorations are held; One Montgomery Tower (an office building located on Kearny and Post streets, despite the name); 555 California Street, the city's fourth tallest skyscraper; the location of the old Hall of Justice at Kearny and Clay Streets now occupied by the Hilton San Francisco Financial District; the Lusty Lady, the nation's first worker-owned peep show; Portsmouth Square, the original Plaza of the pueblo of Yerba Buena; Columbus Tower, the headquarters for American Zoetrope; and Coit Tower, at the top of Telegraph Hill.

== Other uses ==
- "Kearny Street" is a song by American composer Rod McKuen.
