= Clement Chen Jr. =

American architect

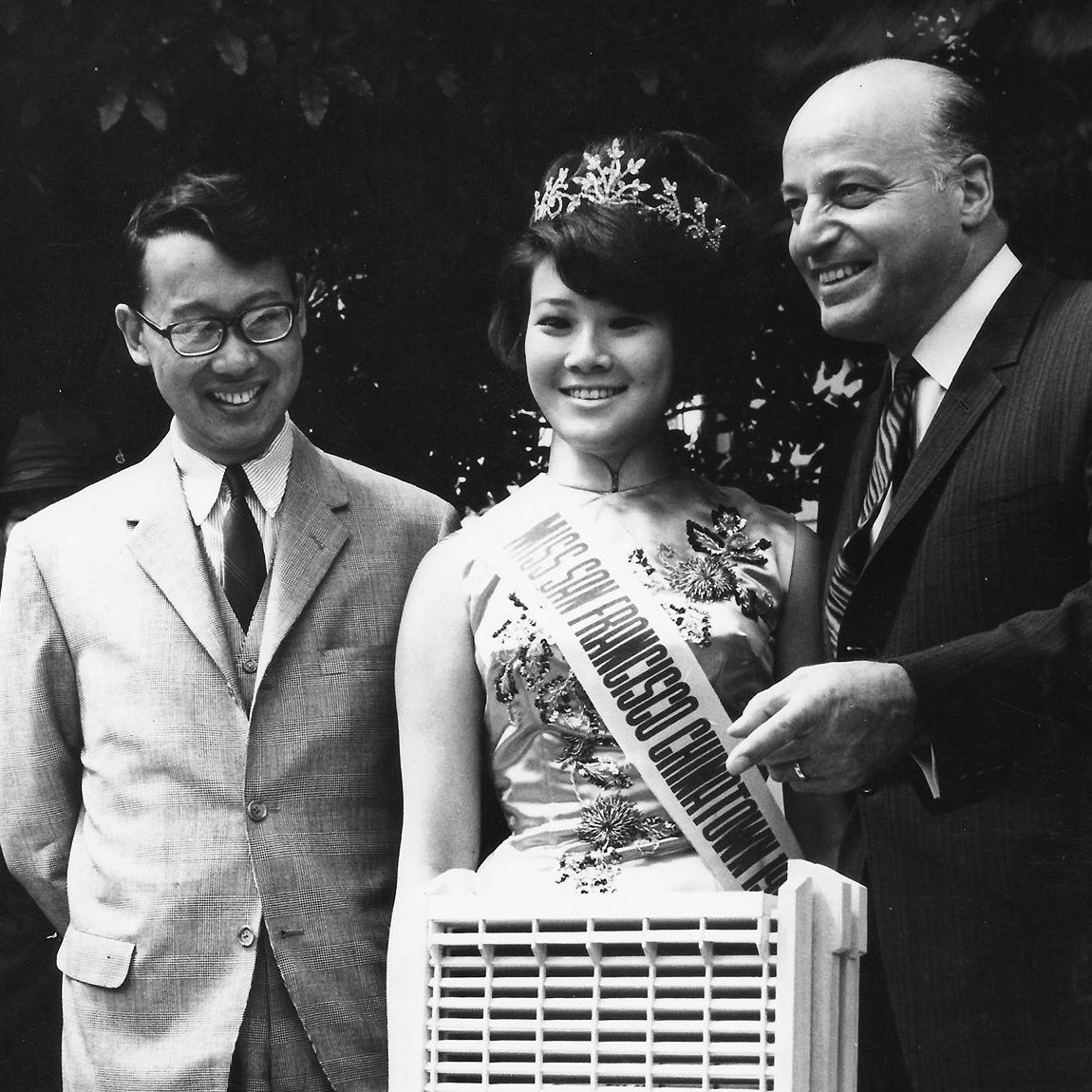
- Clement Chen, Jr., Miss Chinatown 1967, Marilyn Lew, and San Francisco Mayor Joseph L. Alioto with a model of the Holiday Inn – Financial District, home of the Chinese Culture Center
- Born: July 27, 1929; Shanghai, China
- Died: February 19, 1988 (aged 58); Hillsborough, San Mateo County, California, U.S.
- Other names: Clement Chen, Clement Y.T. Chen, Jr.
- Education: Sewanee: The University of the South; Rensselaer Polytechnic Institute
- Occupations: Architect, businessperson
- Notable work: San Francisco Chinatown Hilton Hotel (1968)
- Style: Brutalist, modernist
- Spouse: June Wong

Clement Chen Jr. (1929–1988) was a Chinese-born American architect, and businessperson.

== Biography ==
Clement Chen Jr. was born in Shanghai in 1929. Chen attended St. John's High School, the secondary school of St. John's University, Shanghai. He immigrated from China to the United States in 1949. Chen graduated from Sewanee: The University of the South in 1953 and attended. He designed the Jianguo Hotel, a building on Chang'an Avenue in Beijing.

Chen died on February 19, 1988.
