= 505 Montgomery Street =

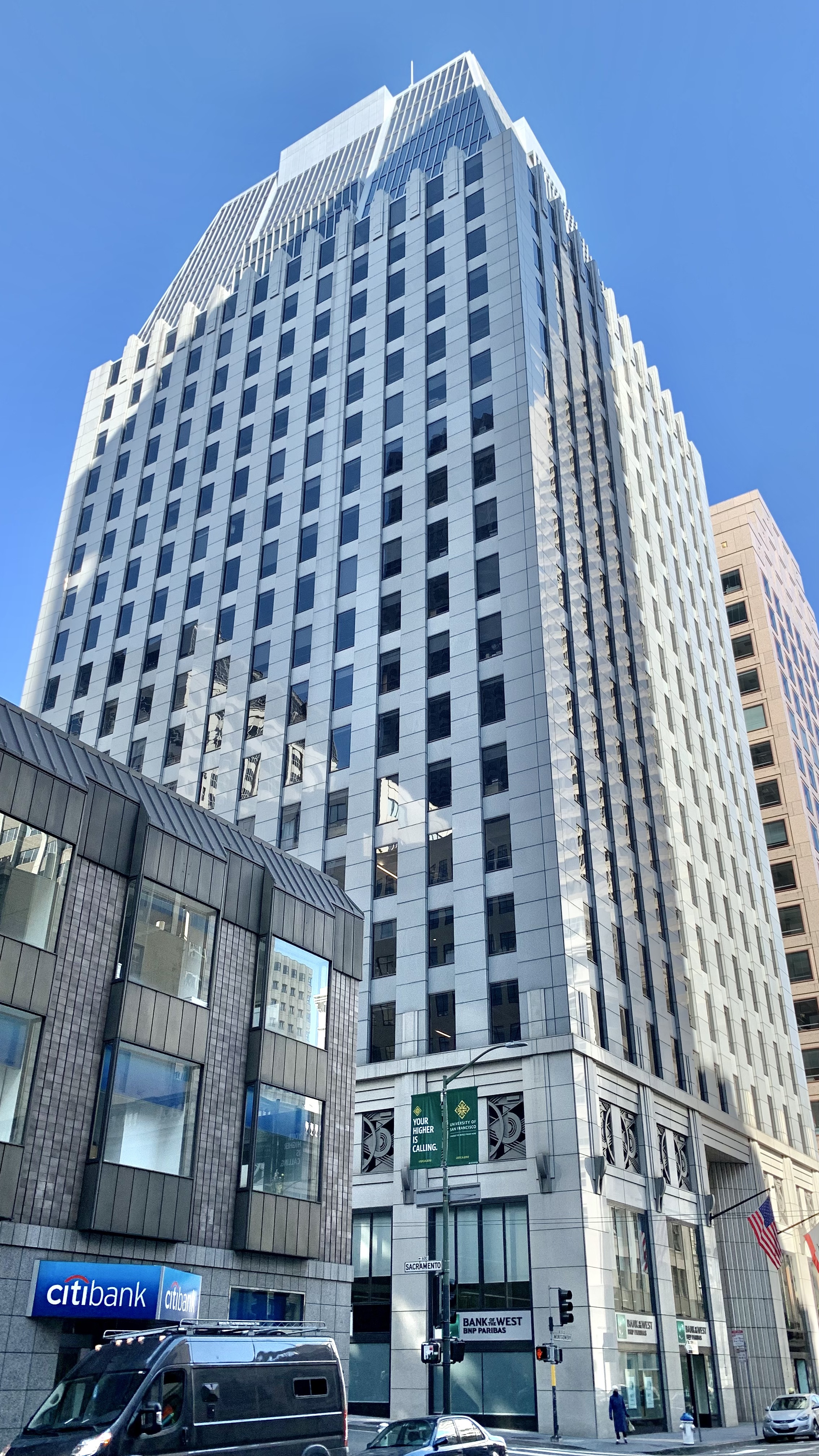
- From one corner (2021)

- Location within central San Francisco 505 Montgomery Street (California)

General information
- Type: Commercial offices
- Location: 505 Montgomery Street; San Francisco, California
- Coordinates: 37.793963°N 122.403409°W
- Completed: 1988
- Owner: RREEF

Height
- Roof: 100 m (330 ft)

Technical details
- Floor count: 24
- Floor area: 333,000 sq ft (30,900 m^{2})

Design and construction
- Architect: Skidmore, Owings & Merrill
- Main contractor: Dinwiddie Construction

505 Montgomery Street is a 24-story, 330 ft (100 m) class-A office building in the Financial District of San Francisco, California. The 98-foot (30 m) spire perched atop the building is thought to be a replica of the Empire State Building, but that association is mainly due to the publicity stunt during the opening of the building, which involved an inflatable 40-foot (12 m) gorilla perched on the spire.

== History ==
505 Montgomery was developed by the Empire Group of San Francisco. Empire assembled ten contiguous parcels in 1978, and filed their initial design study on January 7, 1983 with the San Francisco Department of City Planning. The initial design called for a 28-story building, 416 feet (127 m) high including a 16-foot (4.9 m) mechanical penthouse and ground-floor commercial space. The design was revised to a 24-story building based on floor area ratio calculations, and the final conditional use authorization was granted in June 1984. During construction, Mitsui Fudosan acquired a controlling interest in the unfinished building from The Empire Group and development was completed under the management of AMB.

Retrofitting projects, including a 1994 lighting retrofit, earned the building an Energy Star label. National Office Partners (NOP), a partnership between Hines Interests LP and CalPERS, acquired 505 Montgomery from Mitsui Fudosan and The Empire Group in 1999. The building was subsequently sold by NOP to RREEF in 2005.

== Design ==
505 Montgomery was designed by Skidmore, Owings & Merrill in homage to the Art Deco skyscrapers of the 1930s. It features a stepped-back trapezoidal (mansard) roof and the exterior is clad in polished Barre Gray granite.

== Empire Park ==
Empire Park is located at 642 Commercial Street, and was provided by the developers of 505 Montgomery as a privately owned public space. The initial building design included a pedestrian arcade at the site of 505 Montgomery connecting Sacramento and Commercial streets. However, the arcade would have been rather small, expensive, shaded, and the commercial atmosphere was thought to be unwelcoming for the neighboring community of Chinatown. Therefore, the public open space was moved to a nearby property, which also freed up additional leaseable floor space in 505 Montgomery.

The park originally was named Grabhorn Park, for the Grabhorn Press, the fine printer located on the site from the early 1930s to the early 1940s.

In 2016, a plaque was laid in the "floor" of Empire Park claiming that the park is on the former site of the Eureka Lodgings, where Emperor Norton is documented to have lived from sometime in 1864 or 1865 until his death in January 1880. But, recent research shows that this claim is inaccurate; the Eureka was on a site adjacent to the park that now is occupied by a 4-story apartment building at 650/652 Commercial.
