= Robert Howell Hall =

American judge

Senior Judge of the United States District Court for the Northern District of Georgia
- In office December 31, 1990 – October 14, 1995

Judge of the United States District Court for the Northern District of Georgia
- In office November 2, 1979 – December 31, 1990
- Appointed by: Jimmy Carter
- Preceded by: Seat established by 92 Stat. 1629
- Succeeded by: Julie E. Carnes

Personal details
- Born: Robert Howell Hall; November 28, 1921 Soperton, Georgia
- Died: October 14, 1995 (aged 73) Atlanta, Georgia
- Education: University of Georgia (BS); University of Virginia School of Law (LLB)

Robert Howell Hall (November 28, 1921 – October 14, 1995) was justice of the Supreme Court of Georgia, and later a United States district judge of the United States District Court for the Northern District of Georgia.

== Education and career ==
Born in Soperton, Georgia, Hall received a Bachelor of Science degree from the University of Georgia in 1941 and was in the United States Army Reserve JAG Corps during World War II, from 1942 to 1946. He received a Bachelor of Laws from the University of Virginia School of Law in 1948. He was a professor of law at Emory University School of Law from 1948 to 1961, and was also a lawyer for the State Attorney General's Office of Georgia from 1953 to 1961, serving therein as a deputy assistant state attorney general from 1953 to 1959 and then chief of the Criminal Division until 1961. He was a judge of the Georgia Court of Appeals from 1961 to 1969, presiding judge of that court from 1969 to 1974, and a justice of the Supreme Court of Georgia from 1974 to 1979.

== Federal judicial service ==
On September 28, 1979, Hall was nominated by President Jimmy Carter to a new seat on the United States District Court for the Northern District of Georgia created by 92 Stat. 1629. He was confirmed by the United States Senate on October 31, 1979, and received his commission on November 2, 1979. He assumed senior status on December 31, 1990, serving in that capacity until his death on October 14, 1995, in Atlanta, Georgia.

== Sources ==
Legal offices
Preceded by Seat established by 92 Stat. 1629	Judge of the United States District Court for the Northern District of Georgia; 1979–1990	Succeeded by Julie E. Carnes
