= Trial of Michael Flynn =

Criminal case in U.S. courts

United States v. Flynn
- Court: United States District Court for the District of Columbia
- Full case name: United States of America v. Michael T. Flynn
- Docket nos.: No. 17-232-EGS
- Defendant: Michael Flynn
- Counsel for plaintiff: Brandon Lang Van Grack, U.S. Department of Justice Special Counsel's Office, Zainab Naeem Ahmad, U.S. Department of Justice, Deborah A. Curtis, Jocelyn S. Ballantine, U.S. Attorney's Office for the District of Columbia
- Plaintiff: United States
- Citation: 411 F.Supp. 3d 15 (D.D.C 2019)

Case history
- Prior actions: Michael Flynn pleads guilty to making false statements under 18 U.S.C. § 1001, before withdrawing his plea prior to sentencing, with case assigned to the United States District Court for the District of Columbia. Flynn alleges prosecutors are guilty of violations under Brady v. Maryland, and submits motions to Compel the Production of Brady Material, Produce Newly Discovered Brady Evidence, and to Show Cause.
- Subsequent action: U.S. Attorney for the District of Columbia submits motion to dismiss all charges on May 7, 2020. Petition for Writ of Mandamus granted to Flynn by United States Court of Appeals for the District of Columbia Circuit in In Re: Michael T. Flynn USCA Case #20-5143 (D.C. Cir June 24, 2020)

Holding
- Flynn's motions to compel prosecutors' to produce Brady materials and newly discovered evidence, and to compel prosecutors to show cause, are denied.

Court membership
- Judges sitting: Rudolph Contreras (recused Dec. 7, 2017), Emmet G. Sullivan

Keywords
- Michael Flynn, Brady v. Maryland, Russian interference in the 2016 United States elections, Special Counsel investigation (2017–2019), Making false statements

Michael Flynn, a retired lieutenant general in the United States Armed Forces, was the subject of a criminal case in the United States District Court for the District of Columbia which was dismissed without any convictions in December 2020 following a presidential pardon. Flynn had accepted President-elect Donald Trump's offer for the position of National Security Advisor in 2016 and then briefly served as National Security Advisor. He pleaded guilty to one count of making false statements to the Federal Bureau of Investigation. Flynn's alleged false statements involve conversations he had with Russian Ambassador Sergey Kislyak when Flynn was incoming National Security Advisor to President-elect Trump, and Flynn agreed to cooperate with the Special Counsel investigation as part of a plea deal.

Judge Rudolph Contreras was initially assigned to the case, and he accepted the plea bargain between Flynn and Special Counsel Robert Mueller in December 2017. One week later, Judge Contreras recused himself, and the case was reassigned to Judge Emmet G. Sullivan. Sentencing was postponed several times to allow for cooperation with the Special Counsel investigation. In a sentencing hearing in December 2018, Flynn reiterated his guilty plea before Judge Sullivan, who postponed sentencing again.

In June 2019, Flynn fired his initial counsel from the firm Covington and Burling and hired Sidney Powell. Powell moved to compel production of additional Brady material and newly discovered evidence in October 2019, which was denied by Sullivan in December 2019. Flynn then moved to withdraw his guilty plea in January 2020, claiming that the government had acted in bad faith and breached the plea agreement.

In May 2020, the United States Department of Justice (DOJ) filed a motion to dismiss the charge against Flynn with prejudice, asserting that it no longer believed it could prove beyond a reasonable doubt that Flynn had made false statements to the FBI or that the statements, even if false, were materially false in regards to the FBI's investigation. Sullivan then appointed an amicus, John Gleeson, to prepare an argument against dismissal. Sullivan also allowed amici to file briefs regarding the dismissal motion.

Powell filed an emergency petition for a writ of mandamus in the Circuit Court of Appeals for the District of Columbia, asking (1) that Judge Sullivan be ordered to grant the government's motion to dismiss, (2) for Sullivan's amicus appointment of Gleeson to be vacated, and (3) for the case to be assigned to another judge for any additional proceedings. The appellate court panel assigned to the case ordered Sullivan to respond, and briefs were also filed by the DOJ and amici. In June 2020, the appeals court panel ruled 2–1 in favor of Flynn on the first two requests, and the panel unanimously rejected the third request. Judge Sullivan petitioned the Court of Appeals for an en banc rehearing, a request opposed by Flynn and the DOJ. The appellate court granted Sullivan's petition and vacated the panel's ruling. The case was ultimately dismissed as moot after President Trump pardoned Flynn.

== Background ==
=== Michael Flynn ===
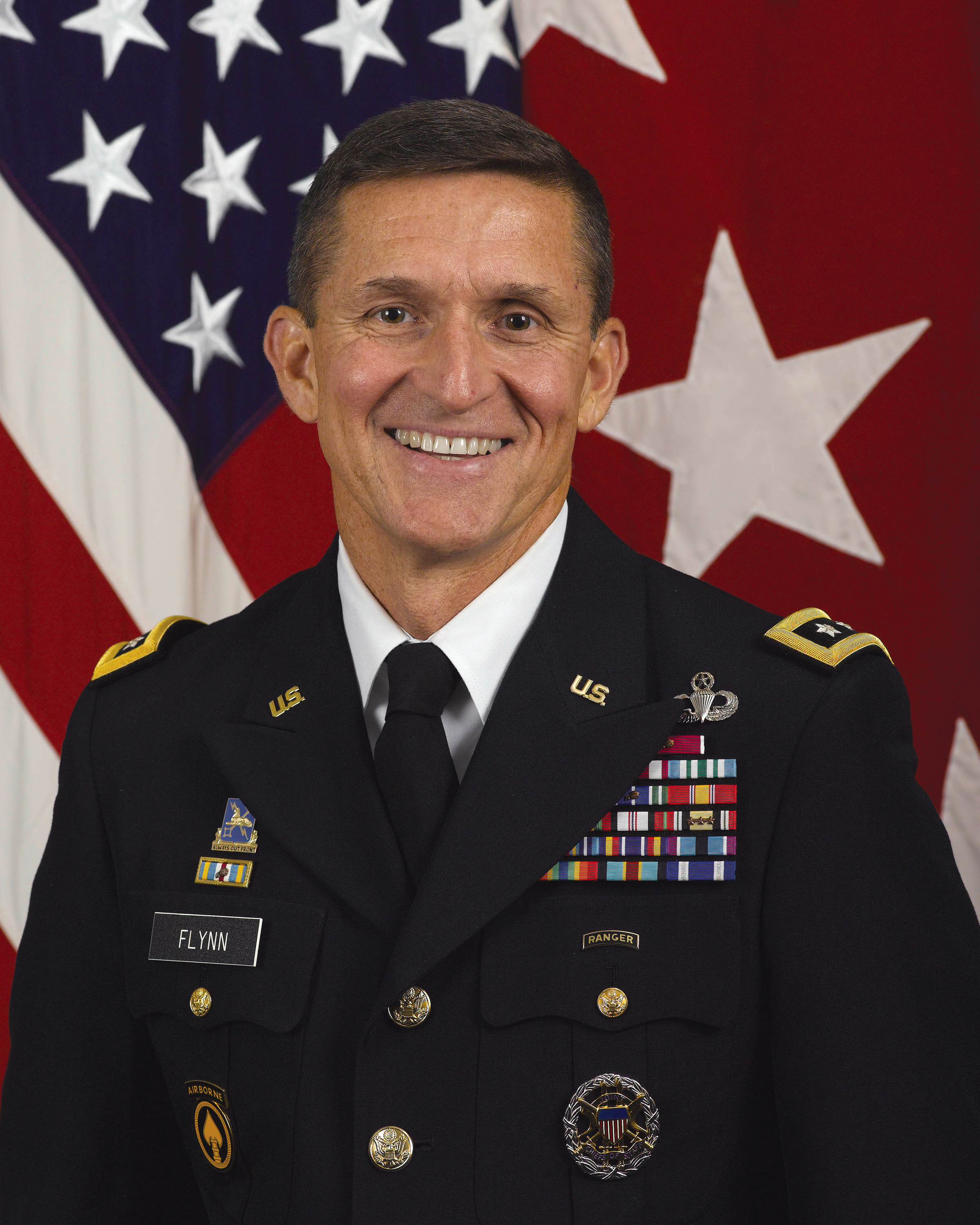
Michael T Flynn

Flynn is a retired lieutenant general in the United States Army who had served as head of the Defense Intelligence Agency. In February 2016, Flynn was asked to serve as an adviser to the Trump campaign. He was viewed as a major asset to the Trump campaign, which had previously struggled to find support among members of the United States Armed Forces. At one point, Flynn had even been vetted as a potential candidate for Vice President by Trump. Trump's enlistment of Flynn to his campaign also marked a clear schism between Trump's foreign policy and that of the outgoing Obama Administration; whereas relations between the United States and Russia had become strained following conflicts in Ukraine and Syria, Flynn had publicly advocated for the United States and Russia to work more closely together to combat ISIS in 2015 and had spoken at a gala honoring the ten year anniversary of the Russian state-owned television network RT. Moreover, Flynn had been publicly critical of then President Barack Obama at the time of Flynn's retirement, stating that America was now less safe from the threat of Islamic terrorism than it had been prior to the September 11 attacks of 2001. On November 18, 2016, Flynn accepted President-elect Trump's offer for the position of National Security Advisor, and Flynn was sworn in on January 22, 2017, briefly serving as the National Security Advisor under President Trump.

=== Opening of FBI Crossfire Hurricane investigation ===
On August 16, 2016, the FBI opened a case on Flynn as part of its Crossfire Hurricane investigation. The purpose of the investigation, code-named Crossfire Razor, was to find out if Flynn was knowingly or unknowingly "involved in activity on behalf of the Russian Federation which may constitute a federal crime or threat to the national security" of the United States. A review of the Crossfire Hurricane investigation, done by Inspector General for the Department of Justice Michael Horowitz, was completed in December 2019. It concluded that "the quantum of information articulated by the FBI to open" the individual investigation on Flynn "was sufficient to satisfy the low threshold established by the [Justice] Department and the FBI". The review "did not find documentary or testimonial evidence that political bias or improper motivation influenced the decisions to open" the investigation against Flynn.

=== Contacts with the Russian ambassador, public statements about these ===
Flynn's history with Russian ambassador Sergey Kislyak dated to 2013; they met when Kislyak coordinated Flynn's trip to Moscow for Flynn's work with the Defense Intelligence Agency.

On December 22, 2016, Flynn, who was then the incoming National Security Advisor, urged Kislyak to have Russia oppose or delay a United Nations Security Council resolution condemning Israeli settlements in Palestine. Flynn was one of several members of the Trump transition team who contacted foreign governments to do so, including Trump himself. According to CBS News, Flynn was instructed to do so by Trump's son-in-law Jared Kushner. As reported by CNN, the Israeli government had asked the Obama administration to veto the resolution, to no avail; the Israeli government then asked the Trump transition team to influence the Obama administration to put forth a veto. On December 23, Kislyak told Flynn that Russia would not oppose such a resolution. The U.S. under the Obama administration abstained from voting, and the resolution passed.

On December 28, U.S. media reported that the Obama administration was preparing to implement retaliatory measures in response to the interference in the 2016 U.S. presidential campaign by the Russian government. President Barack Obama signed Executive Order No. 13757 on December 28, and the sanctions were announced on December 29, including the expulsion of 35 suspected Russian intelligence agents. The Trump transition team discussed the "impact" that the sanctions would have on the incoming Trump administration and feared that the sanctions would damage Russia-U.S. relations.

At the time, Flynn was holidaying in the Dominican Republic, while Trump and several of his Transition Team members were at Trump's Mar-a-Lago property in Florida. After the initial news reports about the retaliatory measures, Kislyak sent a text to Flynn on December 28, asking for a call between them. According to the Mueller Report, on December 29, Flynn sent a message to an aide, noting that Kislyak would contact him that day and that a "tit for tat" with Russia was "not good". Incoming deputy national security adviser K.T. McFarland, who was at Mar-a-Lago, informed Trump transition team members Steve Bannon and Reince Priebus that Flynn was going to talk to Kislyak that day, and McFarland and Flynn conferred by phone regarding how the sanctions could affect the foreign policy objectives of the incoming Trump administration. The Trump transition team members at Mar-a-Lago wanted to avoid Russia escalating the situation, and McFarland and Flynn "both understood that Flynn would relay a message to Kislyak in hopes of making sure the situation would not get out of hand", stated the Mueller Report.

After talking to McFarland, Flynn proceeded to call Kisylak. Flynn told Kisylak that "what I would ask you guys to do ... make sure that you convey this ... do not uh, allow this [Obama] administration to box us in, right now, okay?" Referring to the Obama administration's measures against the "current issue of the cyber stuff", including that "they're gonna dismiss some number of Russians out of the country", Flynn urged Kisylak to have Russia respond only in a "reciprocal" manner: "don't go any further than you have to. Because I don't want us to get into something that has to escalate, on a, you know, on a tit-for-tat." After Kisylak expressed concern that the Russian agencies "FSB and GRU ... are sanctioned", Flynn again urged a response on "an even basis", saying "we know that we're not going to escalate this thing" and that he did not want the Russians to "shut down every embassy". After talking to Kisylak, Flynn informed McFarland about the conversation.

On December 30, Foreign Minister of Russia Sergey Lavrov declared Russia would deploy retaliatory sanctions on the U.S. However, later that day, President of Russia Vladimir Putin changed course by stating that Russia "would not take retaliatory measures" in response to the U.S. sanctions and escalate the conflict between the two nations. On December 31, Kislyak called Flynn again, where he informed Flynn that Putin had not retaliated because Putin had accepted Flynn's request. Flynn told McFarland he thought his conversation with Kislyak had made a positive impact on the situation.

The Obama administration was astonished by Russia's decision not to retaliate, while president-elect Trump publicly praised the Russian reaction. The conversations between Flynn and Kislyak had been intercepted by U.S. intelligence agencies that routinely monitor Kislyak, and The New York Times reported that Obama administration officials discovered on January 2 that Flynn had spoken to Kislyak multiple times after the announcement of U.S sanctions on December 29. The Flynn-Kislyak conversation transcript was reportedly viewed by Obama advisers who had been briefed on its content by the FBI with suspicion as possibly a secret deal between the incoming team and Moscow, which could have violated the dormant Logan Act which bars unauthorized U.S. citizens from negotiating with foreign powers in disputes with the United States.

On January 12, columnist David Ignatius, writing for The Washington Post, made public that Flynn had called Kislyak on December 29, citing a "senior U.S. government official". Ignatius pointed out that this was the same day the U.S. announced the sanctions against Russia, and questioned if Flynn had said anything to "undercut the U.S. sanctions". According to the Mueller Report, the following events happened: Trump reacted angrily to the article by The Washington Post. Trump's incoming chief-of-staff, Reince Priebus, told Flynn of this, stating: "Kill the story". Flynn instructed aide McFarland to lie to The Washington Post that Flynn had not discussed the sanctions with Kislyak on December 29. McFarland knew this was false, but followed Flynn's instructions. Accordingly, The Washington Post reported the denial.

According to the Mueller Report, in the following days, Flynn proceeded to lie about not discussing the sanctions with Kislyak to incoming chief-of-staff Reince Priebus, incoming press secretary Sean Spicer, and vice president-elect Mike Pence. The trio publicly repeated Flynn's falsehood to the media. On January 13, Spicer said the Flynn-Kisylak call was only "centered on the logistics" of setting up a Trump-Putin call after Trump became president. On January 15, Priebus said: "I have talked to General Flynn. None of that came up, and the subject matter of sanctions or the actions taken by the Obama administration did not come up in the conversation." On January 15, Pence said he had discussed the matter with Flynn, and that the Flynn-Kisylak call "did not discuss anything having to do with the United States' decision to expel diplomats or impose censure against Russia". As a result, the Obama administration officials feared that these publicly stated falsehoods would result in "a compromise situation for Flynn because the Department of Justice assessed that the Russian government could prove Flynn lied", stated the Mueller Report.

On January 22, 2017, The Wall Street Journal reported that Flynn was under investigation by U.S. counterintelligence agents for his communications with Russian officials. On January 23, Trump's press secretary Sean Spicer, in his first press conference, said Flynn had not discussed U.S sanctions with Kislyak, citing a conversation with Flynn on January 22. According to the Mueller Report, Spicer was unaware this statement was false; this statement "added to the Department of Justice's concerns that Russia had leverage over Flynn based on his lies and could use that derogatory information to compromise him."

Transcripts of the Flynn-Kislyak conversations exist, and in May 2020, the Trump administration released transcripts of conversations from December 23, 29, 31, 2016, and January 12, 2017, as well as a voicemail from January 19, 2017.

=== FBI interview ===
In January 2017, then-FBI director James Comey decided to send FBI agents to interview Flynn. Knowing Flynn had asked ambassador Kislyak to ensure that Russia would not respond harshly to U.S. sanctions, and also that Flynn had told Mike Pence and Chief of Staff Reince Priebus he had not made this request, Comey decided that Flynn needed to be investigated to make sure he was not acting under Russian influence. Comey asked for Flynn to be called directly to arrange the meeting, instead of following the usual protocol of attempting to arrange a meeting with Flynn through the White House counsel's office. Comey would later state that the usual protocol would have been expected "in an administration where the rhythm of the context between the FBI and the White House was more established".

Another FBI agent, believed to be assistant director of the FBI Counterintelligence Division E. W. Priestap, who was involved with the Flynn investigation, reviewed plans for the meeting and wrote, "What is our goal? Truth/admission or to get him to lie, so we can prosecute him or get him fired?" The agent also wrote, "We regularly show subjects evidence, with the goal of getting them to admit their wrongdoing ... I don't see how getting someone to admit their wrongdoing is going easy on him ... If we get him to admit to breaking the Logan Act, give facts to DOJ & have them decide. Or, if he initially lies, then we present him redacted & he admits it, document for DOJ, & let them decide how to address it ... If we're seen as playing games, [the White House] will be furious. Protect our institution by not playing games."

Then-deputy FBI director Andrew McCabe called Flynn on January 24, asking him to meet two FBI counterintelligence agents; Flynn agreed. McCabe also asked if Flynn wanted a lawyer present, to which Flynn said no. The two agents, FBI Deputy Assistant Director of Counterespionage Division Peter Strzok and FBI agent Joe Pientka, met Flynn at his office later that day. Before the meeting, McCabe, Strzok and Pientka considered whether to remind Flynn beforehand that lying to the FBI during an interview was a crime, but decided against it because "they wanted Flynn to be relaxed, and they were concerned that giving warning might adversely affect the rapport," according to a statement later put out by Flynn's lawyers, based on internal FBI documents.

During the meeting, the FBI agents discussed with Flynn about his contacts with Kislyak regarding the late December 2019 United Nations Security Council resolution regarding Israeli settlements. According to the FBI notes, Flynn told the agents he had not tried to influence Russia's vote on the resolution; in reality, he had asked Kislyak to have Russia oppose or delay the resolution. The FBI agents also asked Flynn whether he had asked Kislyak to avoid escalating the diplomatic conflict, or whether he had advocated against a "tit for tat" Russian response to U.S. sanctions. According to FBI notes, Flynn responded: "Not really. I don't remember. It wasn't, 'Don't do anything'," even after the agents had read back to Flynn his exact statements during the Kislyak call. Flynn had in fact advised Kislyak that Russia should temper their response to the U.S. sanctions.

The FBI agents also asked Flynn about the follow-up phone call between him and Kislyak on this matter; according to the FBI notes, Flynn told the agents he could not remember such a call. This was a false statement, according to the Mueller Report. While the meeting was ongoing, White House aides called for National Security Council lawyer John Eisenberg, who eventually arrived at Flynn's office as the interview was finishing. Flynn told Eisenberg: "I brought these guys over ... I don't have anything to hide."

After the meeting, Pientka prepared an FD-302 form, a form used to summarize an FBI interview, for the discussion with Flynn. Strzok later modified Pientka's report and submitted his own 302 form, which became the official report on the meeting.

Based on the results of the FBI interview, Acting Attorney General Sally Yates made an "urgent" request to meet with newly-appointed White House Counsel Don McGahn. She met with him on January 26 and again on January 27. She informed McGahn that Flynn was "compromised" and possibly open to blackmail by the Russians. Yates told McGahn that Flynn had misled Pence and other administration officials about the nature of his conversation with the Russian ambassador. She added that Flynn's "underlying conduct", which she could not describe due to classification, "was problematic in and of itself", saying "it was a whole lot more than one White House official lying to another." Former United States Secretary of Defense Robert Gates called the possibility of Flynn being blackmailed "kind of a stretch", while acknowledging that his false statement was "a problem ... that I would tell the president about".

=== Departure ===
Michael T. Flynn resignation letter

On February 9, 2017, The Washington Post broke the story that Flynn had discussed the U.S. sanctions with Kislyak, contrary to the public denials made by the Trump administration, citing "nine current and former officials". The New York Times confirmed the story by The Washington Post, stating that a transcript of the Flynn-Kislyak conversation existed. The Washington Post also reported that on February 8 Flynn had given them flat denials about such discussions. Flynn gave denials despite The Washington Post journalist Karen DeYoung informing him that officials "have listened to the intercepts" of his calls with Kislyak.

After The Washington Post published their story, Flynn's spokesman released a statement on February 9 tempering Flynn's denial, describing that Flynn "had no recollection of discussing sanctions", but also "couldn't be certain that the topic never came up". This happened after Flynn was confronted by Reince Priebus, Don McGahn, and John Eisenberg, who also informed Flynn that there were transcripts of his calls with Kislyak. Flynn told the White House officials he "either was not sure whether he discussed sanctions or did not remember doing so" (which was different from what he told Mike Pence and Sean Spicer in January). Meanwhile, Mike Pence only learnt on February 9 that Flynn had lied to him regarding the calls; Pence was informed by that day's media reports, said Pence's spokesman.

As a result of these news reports, public pressure on Flynn increased, and on February 13, Flynn resigned as National Security Advisor, writing that he had given "incomplete information" of his conversations with Kislyak. Before Flynn's resignation, he told The Daily Caller that in his conversation with Kislyak, he told Kislyak he was aware of the expulsion of the 35 Russians, and that: "We'll review everything."

On February 14, White House Press Secretary Sean Spicer said Trump had asked for Flynn to resign, "not based on a legal issue, but based on a trust issue", due to "misleading the Vice President and others, or the possibility that he had forgotten critical details of this important conversation", which "created a critical mass and an unsustainable situation".

Later in December 2017, President Trump said he "had to fire General Flynn because he lied to the Vice President and the FBI", noting that Flynn had "pled guilty to those lies". Also in December 2017, Vice President Pence said that by the time Flynn departed the Trump administration, "I knew that he lied to me." Pence also said Trump "made the right decision" to remove Flynn.

=== Relation to the opening of the Special Counsel investigation ===
On February 14, President Trump met with FBI Director James Comey in the Oval Office and reportedly told him "I hope you can see your way clear to letting this go, to letting Flynn go," adding "he's a good guy." Trump subsequently dismissed Comey on May 9. Prior to the firing, senior White House officials had made inquiries to intelligence officials, such as "Can we ask [Comey] to shut down the investigation [of former national security adviser Flynn]? Are you able to assist in this matter?" Comey had written a memo about the February exchange, which he eventually made public, and the propriety, and even the legality, of the words that Trump reportedly said to Comey about Flynn became a subject of considerable public debate. In response to allegations that the Flynn investigation played a role in Comey's firing, the White House stated that "the president has never asked Mr. Comey or anyone else to end any investigation, including any investigation involving General Flynn," and "this is not a truthful or accurate portrayal of the conversation between the president and Mr. Comey." In June, Comey testified before the Senate Intelligence Committee that "I had understood the President to be requesting that we drop any investigation of Flynn in connection with false statements about his conversations with the Russian ambassador in December ... I did not understand the president to be talking about the broader investigation into Russia or possible links to his campaign".

In Congress, in reaction to Comey's firing, over 130 Democratic lawmakers called for a special counsel to be appointed, over 80 Democratic lawmakers called for an independent investigation, while over 40 Republican lawmakers expressed questions or concerns. Attorney General Jeff Sessions had recused himself from any Justice Department investigations regarding Russian interference in the election after questions arose regarding contacts in 2016 between then-Senator Sessions and Russian ambassador Sergei Kislyak. Due to Sessions' recusal, Deputy Attorney General Rod Rosenstein was Acting Attorney General for those matters. On May 17, 2017, Rosenstein appointed Robert Mueller, a former Director of the FBI, to serve as Special Counsel for the United States Department of Justice (DOJ) with authority to investigate Russian interference in the 2016 United States elections, including exploring any links or coordination between Trump's 2016 presidential campaign and the Russian government; "any matters that arose or may arise directly from the investigation"; and any other matters within the scope of 28 C.F.R. § 600.4(a).

=== Continued investigation ===
Flynn had offered to testify to the FBI or the Senate and House Intelligence committees relating to the Russia probe in exchange for immunity from criminal prosecution. However, the Senate Intelligence Committee rejected Flynn's offer for testimony in exchange for immunity. Flynn initially declined to respond to a subpoena from the Senate Intelligence Committee, invoking his Fifth Amendment right against self-incrimination, but he and the committee later struck a compromise. The Pentagon inspector general was also investigating whether Flynn accepted money from foreign governments without the required approval.

On November 5, 2017, NBC News reported that Robert Mueller had enough evidence for charges against Flynn and his son, Michael G. Flynn. On November 22, NBC News reported that Flynn's business partner Bijan Kian was a subject of the Mueller probe. NBC reported that a Turkish businessman named Reza Zarrab, who was picked up in 2016 by US authorities in Miami on Iranian sanctions violations and money laundering charges, was offering evidence against Flynn. Flynn's firm was paid more than $500,000 by Inovo, a Netherlands firm owned by Turkish businessman Kamil Ekim Alptekin, for work which included investigating Turkish cleric Fethullah Gülen. In turn Alptekin received $80,000, said to be a kick-back in a report done by Reuters.

On November 23, 2017, news media reported that Flynn's lawyers had notified Trump's legal team that they could no longer discuss anything regarding Mueller's investigation, suggesting that Flynn might be cooperating with prosecutors or negotiating a plea deal. As part of Flynn's plea negotiations, his son, Michael G. Flynn, was expected to avoid charges.

== Court proceedings ==
=== Plea bargain ===
Michael T. Flynn, statement of the offense

The case was initially assigned to Judge Rudolph Contreras in the District of Columbia's U.S. District Court. On December 1, 2017, Flynn and Special Counsel Robert Mueller agreed to a plea bargain before Judge Contreras. In the agreement, Flynn pleaded guilty to one felony count of "willfully and knowingly making materially false statements and omissions to the Federal Bureau of Investigation" about conversations with the Russian ambassador to the United States, Sergey Kislyak, "in violation of 18 U.S.C. § 1001(a)(2)." In the Statement of the Offense to which Flynn agreed, he said he falsely denied that on December 29, 2016, he had asked Kislyak that Russia "refrain from escalating ... in response to sanctions that the United States had imposed against Russia" and falsely denied that on December 22, 2016, he had "requested that Russia vote against or delay" a pending United Nations Security Council resolution condemning Israeli settlements. The Statement of the Offense also noted that Flynn had filed Foreign Agents Registration Act (FARA) documents on March 7, 2017, with "materially false statements and omissions" regarding his work for the Republic of Turkey. Flynn's guilty plea acknowledged that he was cooperating with the Special Counsel investigation, and it was accepted by the court. On December 7, 2017, Judge Contreras recused himself from the case, and it was reassigned to Judge Emmet Sullivan.

=== Delayed sentencing ===
Flynn's sentencing was deferred for the first time on January 31, 2018, to accommodate continued cooperation with the Special Counsel investigation as part of his plea agreement. Additional deferrals continued throughout 2018 for the same reason, and he was finally scheduled to be sentenced on December 18, 2018. In a sentencing memorandum released on December 4, 2018, the Mueller investigation stated Flynn "deserves credit for accepting responsibility in a timely fashion and substantially assisting the government" and should receive little or no jail time.

Flynn's attorneys submitted a sentencing memo on December 11, 2018, requesting leniency and suggesting FBI agents had tricked him into lying during the January 24, 2017, White House interview and did not advise him that lying to federal agents is a felony. The memo also asserted that Flynn's relaxed behavior during the interview indicated he was being truthful. Trump echoed this assertion two days later on Twitter and Fox News, asserting, "They convinced him he did lie, and he made some kind of a deal." Mueller's office rejected these assertions the next day, stating agents had told Flynn portions of what he had discussed with Russian ambassador Sergei Kislyak to jog his memory, but Flynn did not waver from his false statements. FBI agents concluded that Flynn's relaxed behavior during the interview was actually because he was fully committed to his lies. Mueller's office also documented instances when Flynn lied about the Kislyak conversation during the days before the FBI interview. Judge Emmet G. Sullivan ordered documents related to the interview be provided to him prior to Flynn's December 18, 2018 sentencing. The New York Times reported that Flynn's "decision to attack the FBI in his own plea for probation appeared to be a gambit for a pardon from Mr. Trump, whose former lawyer had broached the prospect last year with a lawyer for Mr. Flynn."

Sullivan, who had a history of skepticism about government conduct, including dismissing a corruption case against senator Ted Stevens due to prosecutorial misconduct, rebuked Flynn at his December 18, 2018 sentencing hearing. Citing evidence not released to the public, the judge told him, "arguably you sold your country out", and warned, "I cannot assure that if you proceed today you will not receive a sentence of incarceration." He offered to delay the sentencing until Flynn's cooperation with investigators was complete. After conferring with his attorneys, Flynn accepted the delay. During the hearing, Sullivan indicated he was offended by the suggestion in the sentencing memo submitted by Flynn's attorneys that the FBI had misled Flynn, as it created an appearance that Flynn wanted to accept a generous plea deal from prosecutors while also contending he had been entrapped. He asked several questions of Flynn's attorney, Robert Kelner, to determine if the defense was maintaining that the FBI had acted improperly in its investigation of Flynn, including whether he had been entrapped. Kelner responded, "No, your honor" to each question. Judge Sullivan also asked Flynn multiple questions under oath, including whether he wanted to withdraw his guilty plea, still accepted responsibility for his false statements and wanted to plead guilty, and was satisfied with his legal representation. Flynn restated his guilty plea, and acknowledged to Sullivan he was aware that lying to federal investigators was a crime at the time of his initial FBI interview in January 2017. Sullivan then delayed sentencing. Judge Sullivan subsequently granted additional deferrals, most recently on November 27, 2019 and February 10, 2020.

On May 16, 2019, an unredacted version of a December 2018 government sentencing memo for Flynn showed that he advised investigators that both before and after his guilty plea "he or his attorneys received communications from persons connected to the Administration or Congress that could have affected both his willingness to cooperate and the completeness of that cooperation." The Mueller Report described a November 2017 voicemail Flynn's attorneys received from Trump's "personal counsel", reportedly John Dowd, who said: "[I]f... there's information that implicates the President, then we've got a national security issue ... so, you know ... we need some kind of heads up," reiterating the president's "feelings toward Flynn and, that still remains." The newly unredacted information also showed that members of the Trump campaign discussed contacting WikiLeaks about the release of emails and "potential efforts to interfere with the SCO's investigation." The day the unredacted court filing was released, Sullivan ordered that the full transcript of the voicemail be released to the public by May 31, as well as the transcript of Flynn's conversation with Kislyak and unredacted portions of the Mueller Report relating to Flynn. The Justice Department released the Dowd transcript on May 31, but not the Flynn materials.

=== Change of counsel and plea ===
A June 6, 2019 court filing disclosed that Flynn had terminated the Covington & Burling attorneys who negotiated his plea deal. That same month, Flynn hired Sidney Powell to represent him. She had previously urged Flynn to withdraw his guilty plea and had also previously written an opinion piece stating that judge Sullivan "is a real judge who believes in the rule of law and has the integrity to enforce it equally." On Twitter, Trump complimented Powell and wished Flynn and Powell luck. Powell accused Flynn's former attorneys of conflict of interest and inadequate representation of her new client. Powell made regular appearances on Fox News, leading to her being noticed by President Trump, resulting in numerous phone conversations between them. On the same day it was disclosed Flynn had fired his attorneys, Powell sent a letter to Attorney General Bill Barr requesting the "utmost confidentiality" and argued that Flynn's prosecution was due to "corruption of our beloved government institutions for what appears to be political purposes." Among other things, she requested that Barr appoint an outsider to investigate. Six months later, Barr appointed Jeffrey Jensen to conduct such an investigation.

Testimony of contractors of the Flynn company in the Bijan Rafiekian trial indicate their foreign customer was interested in classified government information on Turkey's cleric Fethullah Gülen, surveillance of Gülen supporters, and likely terrorist links that might be turned up by their own investigations of the Turkish cleric. Bijan Rafiekian, who was a partner of Michael Flynn in the Flynn Intel Group and worked with the incoming Trump administration's transition team, was charged with illegally acting as an unregistered agent of Turkey. In 2019 a federal judge threw out the guilty verdicts against Bijan Rafiekian, citing insufficient evidence to sustain his conviction on either count.

In August 2019, Flynn's attorneys filed a motion to hold the prosecutors in contempt for "malevolent conduct", accusing them of withholding material that benefited his case to cause him to plead guilty. They alleged that parts of the federal government had attempted to "smear" him as a Russian agent, "or the victim of a criminal leak or other abuses related to classified intercepts of his calls with Kislyak". In October 2019, Flynn's lawyers further alleged in court filings that "high-ranking FBI officials orchestrated an ambush-interview ... not for the purpose of discovering any evidence of criminal activity ... but for the purpose of trapping him into making statements they could allege as false." They also moved to compel production of additional Brady material and newly discovered evidence.

On December 16, 2019, after a review of possible case related findings in the Michael Horowitz report, Sullivan rejected the assertions of FBI entrapment and prosecutorial malfeasance, setting his sentencing date for January 28, 2020. Sullivan asked prosecutors to present a new sentencing memo; they had previously recommended little or no jail time, but more recently suggested they might change their position. On January 7, 2020, prosecutors presented a sentencing memo calling for Flynn to be sentenced to a term of up to six months. One week later, Flynn's lawyers filed a motion seeking permission to withdraw his guilty plea "because of the government's bad faith, vindictiveness, and breach of the plea agreement". On January 16, Sullivan postponed Flynn's sentencing date to February 27. On January 22, Flynn requested he be sentenced to probation and community service if his request to withdraw his guilty plea is not granted. On January 29, 2020, Flynn filed a personal declaration with the court, declaring under penalty of perjury that he was innocent, that he still did not remember whether he had discussed sanctions with Kislyak or the details of their discussion of the United Nations vote on Israel, that his Covington attorneys had not provided effective counsel, and that he "did not consciously or intentionally lie" to the FBI agents who had interviewed him. After senior Justice Department officials intervened in February 2020 to recommend a lighter sentence for Roger Stone than prosecutors had recommended the day before, NBC News reported that the previous month senior DOJ officials had also intervened to recommend Flynn's sentence be reduced from up to six months in the original recommendation to probation.

Attorney General Bill Barr appointed Jeffrey Jensen, the U.S. attorney for the United States District Court for the Eastern District of Missouri, to examine Flynn's prosecution. On February 10, 2020, Flynn's sentencing was postponed indefinitely, to allow both sides to prepare arguments in response to his claim that his previous lawyers violated his constitutional rights by providing inadequate legal counsel.

=== Justice Department's motion to drop charges ===
Michael Flynn DOJ motion to dismiss

In February 2020, Attorney General William Barr declared that there would be a review of Flynn's case. Barr chose St. Louis' chief federal prosecutor, Jeffrey Jensen, to conduct the review. Jensen himself was nominated by President Trump for the St. Louis position. Trump had publicly called for Flynn's charges to be dropped. In late April or early May, Jensen recommended to Barr that the charges be dropped, and Barr agreed with the recommendation.

On May 7, the Department of Justice (DOJ) filed a motion to dismiss with prejudice the criminal information against Flynn. The motion was filed pursuant to Federal Rules of Criminal Procedure Rule 48 (A). The DOJ asserted that it no longer believed it could prove beyond a reasonable doubt that Flynn had made false statements to the FBI, or that these lies were materially false in regards to the FBI's investigation. The motion, filed by Timothy Shea, interim United States Attorney for the District of Columbia and a longtime adviser of Barr's, stated that Flynn's questioning "was untethered to, and unjustified by, the FBI's counterintelligence investigation". Lead DOJ prosecutor Brandon L. Van Grack withdrew from the case, and no DOJ attorneys who had been involved in the case signed on to Shea's motion. Van Grack had contended in previous filings that the "topics of sanctions went to the heart of the FBI's counterintelligence investigation, [and] any effort to undermine those sanctions could have been evidence of links or coordination between the Trump campaign and Russia." Sidney Powell, Flynn's attorney, said prosecution filings had been made in "bad faith", and Brady materials had been withheld. Judge Sullivan had previously ruled that Flynn's statements were material to the Russia campaign interference inquiry. It was left to Sullivan to determine whether to dismiss the charges and also to prevent a retrial on the charges. Sullivan had the option of requesting written submissions on the motion and also could determine if additional Brady disclosure materials that should have been provided to the defense could be added to the record.

On May 12, U.S. District Judge Emmet G. Sullivan ordered a hold on the Justice Department's intent to drop charges, saying he expects that independent groups and legal experts will wish to intervene. Judge Sullivan said he will set schedules for filing "friend-of-the court" or amicus briefs. On May 13, Judge Sullivan appointed John Gleeson, a retired U.S. District Judge, to act as an amicus curiae "to present arguments in opposition to the government's Motion to Dismiss" and to "address whether the Court should issue an Order to Show Cause why Mr. Flynn should not be held in criminal contempt for perjury." Judge Sullivan also chose to allow other amicus briefs regarding the dismissal motion, and on May 19, he set a June schedule for amicus briefs and replies, with oral arguments on July 16, 2020. On June 10, Attorney Gleeson filed his amicus brief stating that the government's motion be denied as "the Government's statement of reasons for seeking dismissal is pretextual" and "there is clear evidence of a gross abuse of prosecutorial power" and concluding that "Flynn has indeed committed perjury in these proceedings" that should be taken into account in his sentencing. On June 17, the Justice Department filed a brief with Sullivan asserting that even if Gleeson's findings of gross abuse were true, the Department still had sole authority to drop the case without judicial review. A footnote in the brief stated that assertions of prosecutorial misconduct made by Flynn's attorney, Sidney Powell, were "unfounded and provide no basis for impugning the prosecutors."

Two private appellate attorneys and former Watergate prosecutors, William Taylor and Lawrence Robbins, filed an amicus brief on May 22, noting that the Justice Department had relied on a single 1956 DC Circuit case Weinstock v. United States to make its argument that Flynn's statements, even if false, were not material. The attorneys showed in their brief that the DC Circuit had subsequently rejected that materiality interpretation in United States v. Stadd (2011), which had noted that the Supreme Court had "adopted a different definition of materiality under section 1001" in Neder v. United States (1999).

=== Petition for writ of mandamus ===
On May 19, Flynn's counsel filed an Emergency Petition for a Writ of Mandamus in the United States Court of Appeals for the District of Columbia Circuit requesting a writ ordering the district court to (1) grant the government's Motion to Dismiss with prejudice, (2) vacate its order appointing an amicus curiae, and (3) assign the case to another judge for any additional proceedings. The basis of the petition centered on the DC Circuit Court's precedent in US v Fokker Servs, BV, 818 F.3d 733 (DC Cir 2016) and the recent US Supreme Court decision in United States v. Sineneng-Smith, 500 U.S. ___ (May 18, 2020), and argued that Judge Sullivan lacked authority to order amicus briefs or hold a hearing on the government's unopposed motion.

On May 21, citing US v Fokker, a three-judge panel of the Court ordered Judge Sullivan to file a response addressing Flynn's request within ten days of the order and also invited the Department of Justice to respond. In response to the order, Judge Sullivan retained Beth Wilkinson to help with his response. On June 1, Judge Sullivan and the Department of Justice filed responsive briefs with the appellate court panel. Judge Sullivan argued that the Fokker decision does not apply because it did not consider a situation where the defendant pleaded guilty twice and the prosecutor changed course; Sullivan moved to dismiss. On June 10, Flynn, the Department of Justice, and Judge Sullivan filed reply briefs.

The appellate court also allowed a variety of amici curiae to file briefs. Those in support of Flynn included several Republican State Attorneys General, Former U.S. Attorney General Edwin Meese and the Conservative Legal Defense and Education Fund, and several Republican members of the House of Representatives. Those in support of the United States included several Republican Senators. Those in support of both Flynn and the United States included John Reeves, Eric Rasmusen, and a group of federal practitioners. And those in support of Judge Sullivan included Lawyers Defending American Democracy (representing over 1500 former United States Attorneys, former federal and state judges, and law school faculty), several former Watergate prosecutors, several Federal District Court jurists, and the New York City Bar Association.

On June 12, the appellate court panel heard oral arguments by teleconference.

On June 24, the appellate court panel granted Flynn's petition in a 2-1 ruling, "direct[ing] the district court to grant the government's Rule 48(a) motion to dismiss ... [and] vacat[ing] the district court's order appointing an amicus as moot," with Judge Rao writing for the majority and Judge Wilkins dissenting in part, and the panel unanimously denied the request that the case be reassigned to another judge. The panel held, "In this case, the district court's actions will result in specific harms to the exercise of the Executive Branch's exclusive prosecutorial power. The contemplated proceedings would likely require the Executive to reveal the internal deliberative process behind its exercise of prosecutorial discretion, interfering with the Article II charging authority."

In dissenting, judge Robert Wilkins noted that the Rao opinion addressed only alleged irreparable injury to the government, rather than to Flynn, although it was Flynn who petitioned for the writ of mandamus. He also noted that the majority did not cite any precedent to support such a determination. Wilkins wrote, "It is a great irony that, in finding the District Court to have exceeded its jurisdiction, this Court so grievously oversteps its own." Marty Lederman, a former Justice Department deputy assistant attorney general, and J. Michael Luttig, a former judge for the Fourth Circuit Court of Appeals, both argued that the majority opinion was deeply flawed, noting the decision did not address any alternative remedies that might be available to Flynn, including an appeal of any Sullivan ruling. Lederman also noted that the other majority judge, Karen Henderson, had stated in a 2015 case, "mandamus is inappropriate in the presence of an obvious means of review: direct appeal from final judgment."

In a 1947 Supreme Court ruling denying a petition for a writ of mandamus against a judge, justice Robert Jackson wrote for the court:

Mandamus, prohibition and injunction against judges are drastic and extraordinary remedies. We do not doubt power in a proper case to issue such writs. But they have the unfortunate consequence of making the judge a litigant, obliged to obtain personal counsel or to leave his defense to one of the litigants before him. These remedies should be resorted to only where appeal is a clearly inadequate remedy. We are unwilling to utilize them as substitutes for appeals. As extraordinary remedies, they are reserved for really extraordinary causes.

=== Sullivan petition for en banc review ===
In response to the higher court ruling, Judge Sullivan issued an order staying upcoming deadlines for replies and canceling the July 16 hearing date, but did not address the DOJ's motion further. The writ of mandamus left Judge Sullivan 21 days in which to exercise several options: grant the DOJ's motion to dismiss the charges in accordance with the writ, petition the full appellate court to review the case en banc, or wait to see whether any of the appellate judges requested an en banc rehearing sua sponte. As of July 9, two weeks after the mandamus order, Sullivan did not act on the DOJ motion and no sua sponte request had come forth from the appellate court.

On July 9, Sullivan filed a petition with the appellate court to rehear the case en banc. On July 10, the appellate court ordered Flynn's counsel, Sidney Powell, to file a response to Sullivan's petition within 10 days, invited the government to respond by the same date, forbade unsolicited replies to the responses, and stayed the panel's June 24 ruling pending a decision on the request for the en banc rehearing. On July 20, both Powell and the Department of Justice filed responses, urging the appellate court to reject Sullivan's request for an en banc rehearing. On July 30, the full court agreed to hear the case, vacating the June 24 ruling, scheduling oral arguments for August 11, and advising the parties to "be prepared to address whether there are 'no other adequate means to attain the relief' desired.". By quoting "no other adequate means to attain the relief," the Court cited Cheney v. United States District Court in which the Supreme Court referenced "a condition designed to ensure that the writ [of mandamus] will not be used as a substitute for the regular appeals process."

Appearing before the ten judges of the full court on August 11, acting solicitor general Jeffrey Wall stated that Barr was personally involved in the Justice Department motion to dismiss the case, and that Barr used "nonpublic information from other investigations" in his decision making that was not provided to the district court. Wall added that Sullivan "wants a hearing to probe our motives; no sort of hearing like that is going to be permissible." Powell argued that Sullivan's role was "pretty ministerial" giving him no discretion but to comply with the Justice Department motion, to which judge Thomas Griffith replied, "It's not ministerial and you know it's not. So it's not ministerial, so that means that the judge has to do some thinking about it, right?"

In the en banc hearing, the DC Circuit on August 31 denied the writ of mandamus, as well as the request to assign the case to a different judge, allowing Sullivan to rule on the Justice Department motion to drop the prosecution. Judges Karen Henderson, a George W. Bush appointee, and Donald Trump appointee Neomi Rao dissented in the 8–2 decision. Only those two judges who ruled in favor of Flynn in June, Rao and Henderson, dissented from the court's decision, reversing their earlier position that the case should not be taken from Sullivan and assigned to another judge. During the August 11 hearing, Henderson had stated, "I don't see why we don't observe regular order and allow [Sullivan] to rule." An eleventh judge, Gregory Katsas, recused himself from the decision because he — like Judge Rao — had previously worked in the Trump White House. On the day after the ruling, Sullivan ordered Flynn, the Justice Department and Gleeson to provide a joint status report with a proposed briefing schedule, and three proposed dates and times for oral arguments, by September 21.

=== Subsequent proceedings ===
Gleeson submitted a second amicus brief on September 11 in which he sharply criticized the Justice Department motion to dismiss as a "corrupt and politically motivated favor unworthy of our justice system," writing in part:

To describe the Government's Motion to Dismiss as irregular would be a study in understatement. In the United States, Presidents do not orchestrate pressure campaigns to get the Justice Department to drop charges against defendants who have pleaded guilty—twice, before two different judges—and whose guilt is obvious. And the Justice Department does not seek to dismiss criminal charges on grounds riddled with legal and factual error, then argue that the validity of those grounds cannot even be briefed to the Court that accepted the defendant's guilty plea. Nor does the Justice Department make a practice of attacking its own prior filings in a case, as well as judicial opinions ruling in its favor, all while asserting that the normal rules should be set aside for a defendant who is openly favored by the President. Yet that is exactly what has unfolded here.

On September 24, prosecutors took the unusual step of publicly releasing a summary of an interview with Flynn case agent William Barnett. In the interview, which was conducted by the Department of Justice on September 17, Barnett said he suspected that anti-Trump sentiment had spurred the Mueller investigation.

Also that day, Flynn's attorneys submitted FBI text messages and documents to the court, asserting they represented "outrageous, deliberate misconduct by FBI and DOJ—playing games with the life of a national hero." The documents included handwritten notes by former FBI counterespionage chief Peter Strzok. Four days later, Strzok's attorney wrote to Sullivan that he believed the notes had been altered with the insertion of dates that in one case made it appear a White House meeting had occurred earlier than it actually did. He also asserted the text messages were irrelevant to the Flynn case and the DOJ. Andrew McCabe's attorney also wrote Sullivan about apparent distortions of documents related to his client. Flynn's attorneys also asserted in their filing that "This hideous abuse of power and travesty of justice has only been exacerbated by the unprecedented and baseless rulings of this court, and it should not continue another day." Sullivan had previously ordered Flynn's attorney to stop publicly releasing documents piecemeal until the Justice Department completed its review of the case.

During a September 29 hearing, Sullivan asked Powell if she had spoken to the president about the case. She initially demurred, asserting executive privilege, before acknowledging she'd had "a number of discussions with the President" and had asked him to not pardon Flynn. Powell asked Sullivan to recuse himself, accusing him of bias against Flynn, including by appealing the three-judge DC Circuit panel ruling to the full court, where Sullivan prevailed. In a terse exchange, Sullivan directed Powell to put her recusal motion in writing. Representing the Justice Department, Kenneth Kohl, the acting principal assistant U.S. attorney in Washington, stated, "We're completely unafraid to get in the weeds and address the specifics as to why we thought we needed to dismiss this case," a reversal of Jeffrey Wall's statement to the full DC Circuit Court in August that no such explanation would be forthcoming. Gleeson argued that the Justice Department's "reasons are so patently pretextual that the government feels the need to keep coming up with more of them" and urged Sullivan to proceed with sentencing, stating "If the executive wants to take Michael Flynn off the hook, he can pardon him."

On October 7, the DOJ told the court it had "inadvertently" altered the Strzok and McCabe documents it had submitted on September 24, asserting that sticky notes with "estimated dates" had been applied to the Strzok documents but not removed when the documents were scanned for delivery to the court. The DOJ asserted a similar occurrence with the McCabe documents. On October 23, Sullivan ordered the Justice Department to present by October 26 a declaration under penalty of perjury that exhibits provided to the court are true and correct. Just before midnight on October 26, the DOJ filed a brief in which assistant U.S. Attorney Jocelyn Ballantine asserted "the content of those exhibits was not altered in any way, as confirmed by attorneys for both former FBI employees," though correspondence with Ballantine showed that the McCabe and Strzok attorneys had affirmatively refused to vouch for the accuracy of the exhibits.

== Pardon ==
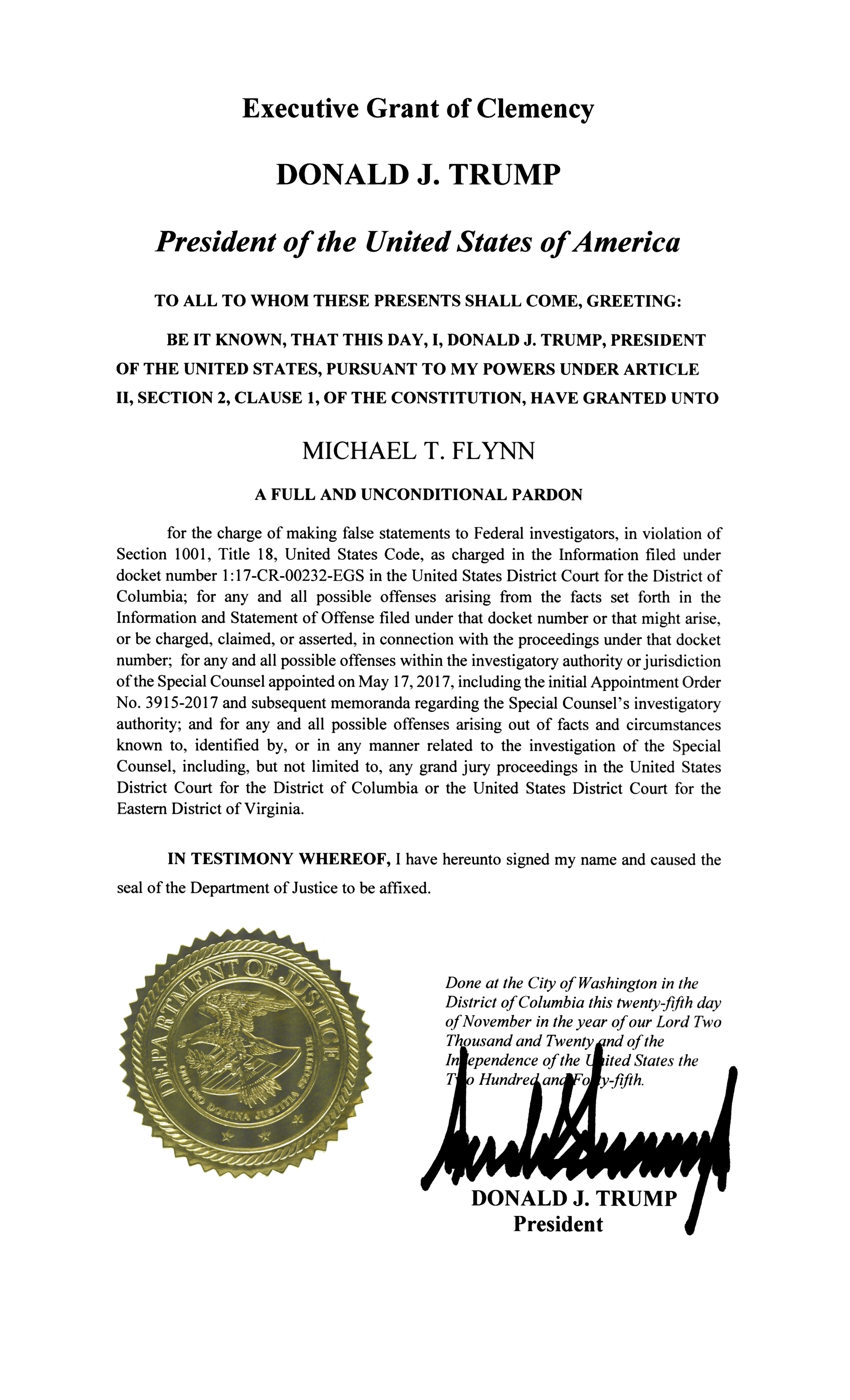
Presidential Pardon of Michael T. Flynn

Flynn received a pardon from President Donald Trump on November 25, 2020. On December 8, 2020, Judge Sullivan dismissed the case as moot, although he suggested that he might have denied the DOJ's original motion had Trump not pardoned Flynn.

In March 2026, the DOJ reached a settlement with Flynn over a wrongful prosecution lawsuit related to his prosecution in this case. The settlement was reported to be for $1.2 million.
