= Sidney Powell =

American lawyer and conspiracy theorist (born 1955)

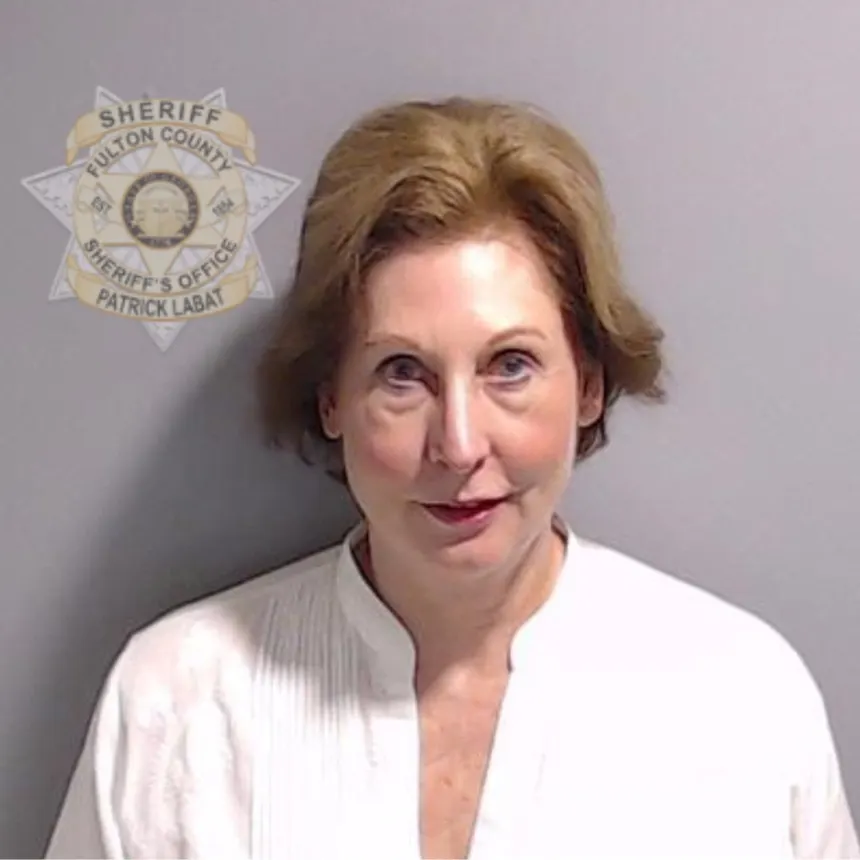
- Mug shot of Sidney Powell, released by the Fulton County, Georgia, sheriff's office
- Born: May 1, 1955 (age 71); Durham, North Carolina, U.S.
- Education: University of North Carolina, Chapel Hill (BA, JD)
- Occupations: Attorney; federal prosecutor
- Years active: 1978–present
- Criminal charges: Felonies: 1 count of Georgia RICO (Racketeer Influenced and Corrupt Organizations) Act; 2 counts of Election fraud; 3 counts of computer crimes; 1 count of Defrauding the State
- Criminal penalty: 6 years' suspended sentence; $6,000 fine; $2,700 restitution
- Criminal status: Pleaded guilty to misdemeanors: 6 counts: conspiracy to commit intentional interference with the performance of election duties
- Website: sidneypowell.com

Sidney Katherine Powell (born May 1, 1955) is an American attorney and former federal prosecutor. In August 2023, she was indicted along with Donald Trump and eighteen others in the Georgia election case. In October 2023, she pleaded guilty to six misdemeanor counts of conspiring to intentionally interfere with the performance of election duties. She was sentenced to six years of probation and agreed to testify against the other defendants.

Prior to her political involvement, Powell served as an assistant United States attorney in the Western District of Texas. She was best known for prosecuting high-profile drug smuggler Jimmy Chagra and, as private counsel, defending Merrill executives in proceedings related to the Enron scandal.

Later in her career, Powell began promoting conspiracy theories. Powell defended retired lieutenant general Michael Flynn in United States v. Flynn, claiming that he was framed by a covert "deep state" operation, and has promoted personalities and slogans associated with QAnon. After the 2020 election, she claimed that there had been a global conspiracy to tamper with voting machines, despite lacking evidence. After she accused the election technology companies Dominion Voting Systems and Smartmatic of engaging in a conspiracy to rig the election, both companies sued her for defamation.

In 2020, Powell joined the legal team of then-President Trump in an attempt to overturn Joe Biden's victory in the 2020 presidential election. Powell continued filing lawsuits independently and ultimately lost four federal lawsuits in Michigan, Georgia, Arizona, and Wisconsin. In August 2021, Michigan federal judge Linda Vivienne Parker formally sanctioned Powell and eight other pro-Trump lawyers for their frivolous suit seeking to overturn Trump's election loss. The attorneys were ordered to repay the legal expenses incurred by the defense and recommended for disbarment. The Commission for Lawyer Discipline of the State Bar of Texas brought a disciplinary action against Powell, alleging that she violated the rules of professional conduct governing lawyers. The Fifth District of Texas Court of Appeals in Dallas, led by a three-judge panel, all Democrats, concluded on April 17, 2024, that the State Bar of Texas' arguments were without merit. Powell successfully defending herself against additional bar sanctions on January 31, 2025 when Chairman of the State’s Board of Disciplinary Appeals, Bud Kirkendall, said, "...the disciplinary board determined that the charges did not meet the minimum threshold for disciplinary action".

== Early life and education ==
Sidney Katherine Powell was born on May 1, 1955, in Durham, North Carolina, grew up in the city of Raleigh, and knew from an early age that she wanted to be a lawyer.

She graduated from Needham Broughton High School and attended the University of North Carolina at Chapel Hill, where she earned a Bachelor of Arts. At the age of 19, she was accepted into the University of North Carolina School of Law, where she graduated in 1978 with a Juris Doctor degree. She began her legal career as one of the youngest federal prosecutors in the U.S.

== Career ==
From 1978 through 1988, Powell was an assistant United States attorney for the Western and Northern Districts of Texas and the Eastern District of Virginia, where she handled civil and criminal trial work. She was appointed Appellate Section Chief for the Western District of Texas and then the Northern District of Texas.

Powell established her own law firm in 1993 in Dallas, Texas. Around 2002, she began to practice in Asheville, North Carolina, but moved back to Texas later.

=== Prosecution for assassination of Judge John H. Wood ===
Powell was best known as one of the prosecutors in the 1979 trial of Jimmy Chagra who was accused in the assassination of John H. Wood Jr., a federal judge from Texas. He was acquitted of involvement in the assassination but convicted on other charges. He later admitted to his role in the conspiracy to murder the judge.

=== Defense of Enron ===
In the 2000s, Powell represented firms and executives involved in the Enron scandal, including the accounting firm Arthur Andersen and former Merrill executive Jim Brown. She was an outspoken critic of the Enron Task Force prosecutions, and accused prosecutor Andrew Weissmann of overreach. After that, Powell wrote extensively about prosecutorial abuses in the 2014 book Licensed to Lie. The book was noticed by then-Senator Orrin Hatch, who described it as "powerful". The experience contributed to her distrust of government institutions.

=== Comments regarding Ted Stevens ===
In Licensed to Lie, Powell contended that prosecutors in the corruption trial of U.S. senator Ted Stevens of Alaska, held in 2008, before federal judge Emmet G. Sullivan in the United States District Court for the District of Columbia, intentionally withheld "Brady material" they should have disclosed to the defense and that they returned Rocky Williams, a terminally ill witness, to Alaska, ostensibly so that his testimony would not exonerate Stevens. The senator was subsequently convicted of seven felony counts of corruption for failing to annually declare gifts from VECO owner Bill Allen. However, due to numerous instances of prosecutorial misconduct, Attorney General Eric Holder moved to dismiss the indictment prior to sentencing, effectively vacating the conviction.

=== Defense of Michael Flynn ===
After publishing her first book, Powell continued writing opinion pieces for right-leaning websites. In 2017, Weissmann joined Robert Mueller's Special Counsel investigation, reviving interest in Licensed to Lie from Newt Gingrich and Sean Hannity. Using her status as a former federal prosecutor, Powell became a leading voice against the Mueller investigation; in a February 2018 op-ed, Powell wrote that retired lieutenant general Michael Flynn should "withdraw his guilty plea" for making false statements to the FBI, alleging "egregious government misconduct". Powell's appearances on Fox News to discuss the Flynn case were noticed by President Donald Trump, and the two spoke on several occasions. To raise money for Flynn's defense, Powell spoke at a November 2018 conference, where she met Flynn's siblings. They agreed that Flynn was the victim of a "deep state plot" and had only pleaded guilty because he was coerced.

Flynn released his law firm of Covington & Burling and retained Powell to serve as his lead attorney in June 2019. On the same day this was disclosed, Powell sent a letter to Attorney General William Barr requesting the "utmost confidentiality" and argued that Flynn's prosecution was due to "corruption of our beloved government institutions for what appears to be political purposes". Among other things, she requested that Barr appoint an outsider to investigate. Six months later, Barr appointed Jeffrey Jensen to conduct an investigation.

The Justice Department filed a motion to drop Flynn's prosecution with presiding federal judge Emmet G. Sullivan in May 2020. Sullivan did not immediately grant the motion; Powell later requested a writ of mandamus from the United States Court of Appeals for the District of Columbia Circuit to compel Sullivan to drop the case. After an initial ruling in favor of Powell by a three-judge panel of the court, the case was appealed to the full court, which denied the mandamus request in an 8–2 ruling and returned the case to Sullivan's court. Powell had argued to the full court that Sullivan's role was "ministerial", giving him no discretion but to comply with the Justice Department motion, to which judge Thomas Griffith replied: "It's not ministerial and you know it's not. So it's not ministerial, so that means that the judge has to do some thinking about it, right?" Other judges on the court also pushed back on Powell's characterization of a federal judge's role. After Trump pardoned Flynn in November 2020, Sullivan dismissed the case as moot, though he stated he probably would have denied the Justice Department motion had the case proceeded. According to a Justice Department official, the Justice Department was not consulted about the pardon.

Soon after taking the Flynn case, Powell had accused the Justice Department of prosecutorial misconduct against Flynn; in a footnote to a June 2020 court brief, the department described Powell's allegations as "unfounded and provide no basis for impugning the prosecutors from the D.C. United States Attorney's Office".

Powell has been described as a proponent of conspiracy theories about Flynn, namely that he was framed by members of the "deep state" who were trying to eject President Donald Trump from office.

=== 2020 presidential election ===
Days before the 2020 presidential election, Dennis Montgomery, a software designer with a history of making dubious claims, asserted that a government supercomputer program would be used to switch votes from Trump to Biden on voting machines. Powell promoted the conspiracy theory on Lou Dobbs Tonight on November 6, and again on November 8, 2020, on Maria Bartiromo's Fox Business program, ...claiming to have "evidence that that is exactly what happened".

On December 10, – long after other hosts had started to push her for more evidence – Dobbs continued to praise her.

"Sidney Powell, thank you for all you're doing," "It is the Lord's work."

The Washington Post indicated Bartiromo asked Powell for proof of specifics of voting fraud made by her, supposedly including dead voters casting ballots, ballots lacking Trump's name, and a postal employee's confession that he had postdated mailed ballots. She said "Sidney, we talked about the Dominion software." "I know that there were voting irregularities. Tell me about that." Powell alleged that a secret international cabal involving communists, "globalists", George Soros, Hugo Chávez (who died in 2013), the Clinton Foundation, the CIA, and thousands of Democratic and Republican officials—including then-Trump ally and Georgia governor Brian Kemp—used voting machines to transfer millions of votes away from Trump in the 2020 presidential election. She also asserted that the CIA ignored warnings about the software, and urged Trump to fire director Gina Haspel. Christopher Krebs, director of the Cybersecurity and Infrastructure Security Agency (CISA), characterized the supercomputer claim as "nonsense" and a "hoax". CISA described the 2020 election as "the most secure in American history", with "no evidence that any voting system deleted or lost votes, changed votes or was in any way compromised".

==== 2020 Election Legitimacy Team ====
In the wake of the election, Trump established a legal team to challenge the legitimacy of the results. On November 14, Trump named Rudy Giuliani to lead the team, with Victoria Toensing, her husband Joseph diGenova, Jenna Ellis, and Powell as members of this team. The team proceeded to file numerous lawsuits in several states over alleged vote harvesting, illegal votes, machine errors, vote dumps, and late-counted votes. Precisely how Powell gained prominence in the legal team is unknown, even to some campaign officials. One official claimed Powell "simply showed up at headquarters".

Giuliani and Powell alleged multiple instances of voter fraud in key states at a November 19 press conference. They cited an affidavit—filed by Russell Ramsland and L. Lin Wood on behalf of the Trump campaign—as evidence of manipulated results. In their comparison of votes cast against total voters registered in Michigan, Powell asserted that they found over-voting of "up to 350 percent in some places". However, the affidavit's conclusion was erroneous since it compared the Michigan vote tallies against population data from Minnesota (whose respective abbreviations are MI and MN, a possible source of the error). When The Washington Post independently checked the numbers, no voter discrepancies were found. When questioned the next day, Wood described this as "a simple mistake" and said the affidavit "will be corrected if it hasn't been already".

After Giuliani's segment ended, Powell took the lectern and alleged, without evidence, that an international communist plot to rig the 2020 election had been engineered by Cuba, China, Venezuela, Hugo Chávez (who died in 2013), George Soros, the Clinton Foundation and antifa. She also alleged that Dominion Voting Systems "can set and run an algorithm that probably ran all over the country to take a certain percentage of votes from President Trump and flip them to President Biden". The source for many of these claims appeared to be far right news organization One America News Network (OANN). She also repeated a conspiracy theory—spread by Congressman Louie Gohmert, OANN and others—that election results showing a landslide victory for Trump had been transmitted to the German office of the Spanish electronic voting firm Scytl, after which a company server was supposedly seized in a raid by the United States Army. The US Army and Scytl refuted these claims; Scytl has not had any offices in Germany since September 2019 and does not tabulate US votes. In a March 2021 report, the Justice and Homeland Security Departments flatly rejected accusations of voting fraud conducted by foreign nations. Jonathan Karl, former ABC News chief White House correspondent for the duration of the Trump presidency, wrote in his November 2021 book, Betrayal, that Powell told Defense Department official Ezra Cohen-Watnick that CIA director Gina Haspel had been injured and detained in Germany while attempting to retrieve the alleged server and destroy the purported evidence. She asked Cohen-Watnick, who previously worked under Flynn in the government, to launch a special operations mission to physically seize Haspel and compel her to confess.

Later on the evening of November 14, on his Fox News program Tucker Carlson Tonight, conservative commentator Carlson said he had invited Powell onto his show to provide proof of her allegations. After repeated requests, he said Powell became angry with him and said he should "stop contacting her." Carlson's team contacted other figures in the Trump campaign who said that Powell had not given them evidence of her allegations.

In an interview with Newsmax on November 21, Powell accused Georgia's Republican governor, Brian Kemp, of being "in on the Dominion scam" and suggested financial impropriety. Powell additionally alleged that fraud had cost Doug Collins the nonpartisan blanket primary against incumbent Kelly Loeffler in the Senate race in Georgia. She also claimed the Democratic Party had used rigged Dominion machines to defeat Bernie Sanders in the 2016 primary, and that Sanders learned of this but "sold out". She said she would "blow up" Georgia with a "biblical" court filing. Powell suggested that candidates "paid to have the system rigged to work for them". On the basis of these claims, Powell called for Republican-controlled state legislatures in swing states to disregard the election results and appoint a slate of "loyal" electors who would vote to re-elect Trump, based on authority supposedly resting in Article Two of the Constitution.

Giuliani and Ellis issued a November 22 statement that Powell was "practicing law on her own" and was not (or was no longer) a part of the Trump legal team. According to The Washington Post, the Trump campaign cut ties with Powell because she was seen as harming Trump's broader legal efforts, and because Trump disliked the coverage she received from Tucker Carlson Tonight. However, she continued to meet with the president in the White House. Shortly after the announcement, her client Michael Flynn tweeted that Twitter had suspended her account for twelve hours, and that she agreed with the campaign's announcement and was "staying the course" to prove election fraud.

On November 23, Fox executive Raj Shah informed his superiors that Fox staff had entreated numerous of its sources within Trump's administration "...to inform reporters that Powell offered no evidence for her claims and didn't speak for the president." Despite this, on November 24 she joined host Lou Dobbs to tell his viewers that in Arizona, "...there were 35,000 votes added to every Democrat candidate just to start their voting off. It's like getting your $500 of Monopoly money to begin with when you haven't done anything, and it was only for Democrats."

Dominion Voting Systems released a statement refuting Powell's fraud claims on November 26.

A draft executive order dated December 16 called for Trump to order a military seizure of voting machines and the appointment of a special counsel; when it surfaced a year later, it was not immediately clear who drafted it. Trump ally Bernard Kerik testified to the January 6 committee that Michael Flynn associate Phil Waldron originated the idea of a military seizure of voting machines.

Powell, who had previously called on the president to invoke the Insurrection Act to deploy military forces, joined an Oval Office meeting on December 18, with Giuliani, Flynn, and Pat Cipollone. There, Trump suggested naming Powell as a special counsel to investigate allegations of election fraud. Most Trump advisors opposed the idea, while Powell characterized them as quitters. The meeting was reportedly heated and included Flynn's proposal for the president to declare martial law.

By December 2020 over 4,000 attorneys had signed an open letter asking bar disciplinary authorities to condemn and investigate Powell's behavior.

In May 2021, Powell continued to express the hope that the election result would be reversed. She spoke at a QAnon conference in Dallas over Memorial Day weekend, where she falsely asserted Trump "can simply be reinstated, that a new Inauguration Day is set", eliciting cheers from the crowd. The date for this was supposedly August 13, however this date passed and Trump was not reinstated.

Powell was subpoenaed in January 2022 to testify before the House Select Committee on the January 6 Attack. She sued to block release of her phone records.

==== Independent election lawsuits ====
While working for Trump, Powell stated she would "release the Kraken", a catchphrase from the 1981 film Clash of the Titans, and the expression spread across Twitter. After the Trump campaign cut ties with Powell, she continued to file independent election lawsuits in Arizona, Georgia, Michigan, and Wisconsin.

Sources described Powell's election-related filings as filled with significant "sloppy mistakes". In her Georgia lawsuit, she claimed that a computer algorithm took votes from Biden and flipped them to Trump, later amending the filing. In Powell's submissions to district courts in Georgia and Michigan, district was misspelled three different ways on the first pages. Powell's Michigan filing also had numerous formatting errors and misidentified one of her experts. Two Republicans said they had been named as a plaintiff in the Georgia and Wisconsin lawsuits despite not having given permission to be included (although one later agreed to remain as a plaintiff).

Powell's lawsuits cited an anonymous witness, referred to as "Spyder" or "Spider", who alleged that American voting systems were "certainly compromised by rogue actors, such as Iran and China". Spyder's real name was redacted from submitted documents; however, a bookmark in the file revealed his identity to be Joshua Merritt, an IT consultant. Although Powell's filings describe Merritt as a former "military intelligence expert", the United States Army Intelligence Center stated that he never worked in military intelligence and had not finished a training course in military intelligence. Merritt acknowledged that the description was wrong and attributed the error to Powell's clerks. However, Merritt claimed he did finish the training, producing an "unofficial transcript" as evidence.

Powell also presented an affidavit from an individual she described as a former intelligence contractor with knowledge of a foreign conspiracy to subvert democracy, who Powell said needed to remain anonymous to protect their "reputation, professional career and personal safety". The Washington Post identified the individual as pro-Trump podcaster Terpsichore Maras-Lindeman, and that parts of the affidavit matched a blog post she had written in November 2019. Maras-Lindeman had served in the Navy for less than a year over two decades earlier, and in a November 2018 civil suit the attorney general of North Dakota accused her of misappropriating funds for personal use from a charitable event she tried to organize. State attorneys asserted that she exaggerated her credentials and used multiple aliases and Social Security numbers in "a persistent effort...to deceive others". Asked about Maras-Lindeman, Powell told the Post: "I don't have the same information you do."

==== Arizona ====
Powell filed a federal lawsuit against Arizona governor Doug Ducey, Arizona secretary of state Katie Hobbs and other Arizona election officials on December 2, alleging that "poll watchers failed to adequately verify signatures on ballots, that Maricopa County ballot dispute referees were partisan, that Dominion backups had no chain of custody, and the Dominion machines themselves suffered from errors during state evaluations." The plaintiffs asked the court to decertify Arizona's election results or order that Arizona certify Trump electors. On December 9, U.S. district judge Diane Humetewa dismissed the case due to plaintiffs' lack of legal standing, and ruled that the allegations of impropriety were "sorely wanting of relevant or reliable evidence", instead being "largely based on anonymous witnesses, hearsay, and irrelevant analysis of unrelated elections". The judge singled out the fraud allegations being put forth, writing that they "fail in their particularity and plausibility" and that there would be "extreme, and entirely unprecedented" harm to Arizona's more than 3 million voters to entertain Powell's lawsuit "at this late date". Powell filed an appeal of the lawsuit's dismissal in the U.S. Court of Appeals for the Ninth Circuit in December, which scheduled the due date for the opening brief to be two months after the inauguration. That month, Powell also filed an emergency petition with the United States Supreme Court seeking an extraordinary writ of mandamus for intervention in the case. The petition was denied without comment on March 1, 2021, ending the matter.

==== Georgia ====
Powell and Lin Wood filed a lawsuit against Georgia governor Brian Kemp and other state officials on November 25, alleging that Dominion Voting Systems was used to rig votes for Biden. The plaintiffs asked the court to halt the certification of elections results and order Kemp to certify Trump as the winner in Georgia. U.S. district judge Timothy Batten issued a temporary restraining order on November 29 that voting machines in Georgia's Cobb, Gwinnett, and Cherokee counties were to preserve their data, after Wood had argued to retain "this information on a very limited basis". Powell appealed to the U.S. Court of Appeals for the Eleventh Circuit to expand the restraining order. A three-judge panel unanimously dismissed Powell's appeal on December 4, citing a failure to prove that the restraining order caused serious harm. The panel also indicated that the original lawsuit, in which Powell also sought to have voting machines inspected, was "considerably delayed" by the appeal.

Powell's evidence in the Georgia lawsuit included an affidavit from Ron Watkins, a former administrator of 8chan/8kun, the online home of QAnon. In his affidavit, Watkins stated that his reading of an online user guide for Dominion Voting Systems software led him to conclude that election fraud might be "within the realm of possibility". Watkins did not provide any legitimate evidence of fraud. Powell also claimed that "a certificate from the [Georgia] Secretary of State was awarded to Dominion Voting Systems but is undated." However, the attached certificate had apparently been edited to remove the date; the actual certificate is dated and available publicly.

Batten dismissed the case in a ruling from the bench on December 7. The judge ruled that the plaintiffs did not have legal standing to bring the case, filed the case too late (as the Dominion machines were adopted months earlier), and filed the case in the wrong venue, the appropriate venue being a state court. Batten also stated that the relief sought by Powell was impossible to grant. The plaintiffs filed an appeal (Case No. 20-14579) of Batten's decision in the U.S. Court of Appeals for the Eleventh Circuit on December 8. Powell also appealed the decision to the U.S. Supreme Court, which denied a motion to expedite the case. She dropped the lawsuit on January 19, 2021, one day before Biden's inauguration.

In August 2022, Fulton County district attorney Fani Willis sought to have Powell testify before a special grand jury seated for the investigation into possible illegal election interference. Powell was involved in arranging for the collection of data from election systems and voting machines at the county's elections office in rural Coffee County in January 2021.

On October 19, 2023, Powell pleaded guilty to six misdemeanor charges for her role in the attempt by the former president and his allies to alter the outcome of the election in the State of Georgia and other states. She was sentenced to serve six years' probation (one year for each charge) and pay a $6,000 fine, and agreed to testify against the other defendants.

On October 31, 2023, the Georgia secretary of state's chief operating officer, Gabriel Sterling, displayed the final payment check from Powell at a press conference where he said that the check represented an admission that Powell's claims against Georgia's voting machines were false. He said, "If you didn't believe the three recounts, if you didn't believe the investigations, if you didn't believe the court cases, this check shows you she says, yes, I lied."

==== Michigan ====
Powell filed a lawsuit against Michigan governor Gretchen Whitmer and other state officials on November 25, alleging a variety of violations of the election code and asking the court to decertify the state's election results or certify them for Trump. In the lawsuit, Powell submitted a witness's declaration that Joe Biden had "received more than 100% of the votes" in Edison County; however, there is no Edison County in Michigan or any other U.S. state. There is an Edison Township in Minnesota, leading to speculation that the information was again taken from a list of Minnesota precincts.

U.S. district judge Linda V. Parker denied the requested relief on December 7, stating that the plaintiffs had only offered "theories, conjecture, and speculation" of potential vote switching. The judge also declared that the "ship has sailed" for most of the relief requested by the plaintiffs, while the rest "is beyond the power of any court". Furthermore, Parker wrote that the relief requested would "greatly harm the public interest" and felt that the plaintiffs' motive for filing the case was not to win, but rather to shake "people's faith in the democratic process and their trust in our government". Powell has filed an appeal of the decision in the U.S. Court of Appeals for the Sixth Circuit, as well as the U.S. Supreme Court, which denied a motion for expedited review of the case. The city of Detroit has called for sanctions against the plaintiffs in the case as well as their counsel, requesting that Powell and the other attorneys be disbarred for "trying to use this court's processes to validate their conspiracy theories". Michigan attorney general Dana Nessel filed a similar motion on January 28, 2021, accusing Powell and three Michigan lawyers of violating their oaths by attempting to overturn Biden's victory. On February 1, 2021, Nessel, along with Michigan governor Whitmer and Michigan secretary of state Jocelyn Benson, filed complaints with the State Bar of Texas seeking Powell's disbarment.

During a July 2021 hearing to consider sanctions against Powell and other attorneys for their activities in Michigan, Parker discussed the hundreds of pages of allegations by others that the attorneys had submitted to courts, which included an individual claiming to have witnessed poll workers changing votes from Trump to Biden. None of the attorneys responded when Parker asked if they had spoken to the witness to vet their allegation.

On August 25, 2021, Judge Parker ruled that Powell, L. Lin Wood, and seven other pro-Trump lawyers had filed the suit "in bad faith and for an improper purpose"; that their litigation was "a historic and profound abuse of the judicial process"; and that they had filed "baseless and frivolous lawsuits in order to undermine public confidence in the democratic process." The court ordered that they pay attorney's fees to the City of Detroit and State of Michigan to reimburse them for the costs of defending against the suit, and referred them to their respective state bars for investigation into ethical violations, which could lead to disbarment.

On November 4, 2021, a closed-door investigatory hearing was held by the State Bar of Texas to begin the process of determining possible sanctions or disbarment for Powell. On December 2, 2021, Judge Parker ordered Powell, Wood and the other "Kraken" attorneys to pay $175,250 to the city of Detroit and the state of Michigan.

==== Wisconsin ====
Powell filed a federal lawsuit against the Wisconsin Elections Commission on December 1, claiming that Dominion Voting Systems and Smartmatic were used to conduct electronic ballot-stuffing and rig votes for Joe Biden. The lawsuit asked the court to decertify the state's election results or declare Donald Trump the winner of the state. The lawsuit mistakenly demanded the release of video footage from a voting center in Michigan and made erroneous references to the election in Georgia and the Georgia state legislature. U.S. district judge Pamela Pepper filed a December 2 order noting that while an "expedited" injunction was sought, the initial filings did not "indicate whether the plaintiffs are asking the court to act more quickly or why", and did not request a hearing or propose a briefing schedule. Pepper dismissed the case on December 9, writing that the "federal court has no authority or jurisdiction to grant the relief the remaining plaintiff seeks", and that the litigation on behalf of the plaintiff was "sometimes odd and often harried" and ultimately failed to establish why a federal case was appropriate. Pepper also repeatedly stated that the plaintiff did not have legal standing to bring the case and concluded that granting the relief would be unconstitutional. Powell then applied for a writ of mandamus from the U.S. Supreme Court, which rejected her petition on March 1, 2021, to end the lawsuit; Powell said the court's decision "completes the implosion of each of our three branches of government into the rubble of a sinkhole of corruption".

==== Defamation lawsuits against Powell ====
Dominion Voting Systems sent a letter to Powell on December 16, 2020, demanding she publicly retract her baseless allegations about the company. Shortly thereafter, the Trump legal team instructed dozens of staff members to preserve all documents relating to Dominion, Powell and others for any future litigation. Smartmatic sent a similar demand letter to conservative television outlets and within days Fox News, its sister network Fox Business, as well as Newsmax broadcast segments walking back conspiracy allegations they had previously promoted.

On January 8, 2021, Dominion sued Powell for defamation and asked for over $1.3 billion in damages. On February 4, 2021, Smartmatic filed a defamation lawsuit that accused Powell, Fox News, some hosts at Fox News, and Rudy Giuliani of engaging in a "disinformation campaign" against the company, and asked for $2.7 billion in damages. In March 2022 a New York State Supreme Court judge dismissed the Smartmatic allegations against Powell on jurisdictional grounds; however, the company had already filed a second lawsuit in Washington, D.C. in anticipation of the New York ruling.

On March 22, 2021, lawyers defending Powell against Dominion's lawsuit filed a motion to dismiss the lawsuit. They argued that "no reasonable person would conclude that the statements [by Powell about the 2020 election] were truly statements of fact". Instead, "it was clear to reasonable persons that Powell's claims were her opinions and legal theories", argued the lawyers. Furthermore, the lawyers claimed that Dominion could not prove that Powell took action with "actual malice", because "she believed the allegations then and she believes them now". On August 11, 2021, Judge Carl Nichols denied this motion to dismiss the lawsuit. A scheduling order filed March 1, 2022, for Dominion's suit against Powell and parallel lawsuits against Rudy Giuliani and My Pillow, Inc., calls for depositions and pretrial motions through September 2023.

Venezuelan businessman Majed Khalil sued Powell, Fox News, and Lou Dobbs for $250 million in December 2021, alleging they had falsely implicated him in rigging Dominion and Smartmatic machines. The lawsuit was settled out of court for an undisclosed amount in April 2023.

In 2024, Powell settled a defamation lawsuit brought by a Dominion executive.

=== QAnon ===
Powell has been described by some sources as a supporter of the QAnon conspiracy theory, a far-right conspiracy theory which alleges that a cabal of Satan-worshipping pedophiles is running a global child sex-trafficking ring and plotting against former president Donald Trump, who is fighting the cabal. In January 2020, Powell denied knowledge of QAnon or Q; later that year, she retweeted major QAnon accounts and catchphrases and appeared on QAnon shows on YouTube. Upon leaving Trump's legal team, Powell was embraced by QAnon followers, many of whom had become discouraged that years of predictions of a Trump landslide victory and coming revelations about his enemies had not materialized. On January 8, 2021, Twitter permanently suspended the accounts of Powell, Michael Flynn and others. A statement from Twitter said this development was in line with their policies on "coordinated harmful activity".

In May 2021, Powell (alongside Lin Wood and Michael Flynn) was a keynote speaker at what was essentially a QAnon conference in Dallas, Texas.

=== Texas Bar petition against Powell ===
On March 1, 2022, the State Bar of Texas's Commission for Lawyer Discipline submitted in court a disciplinary petition against Powell alleging that she had violated several rules of professional conduct, such as those about making false statements to a tribunal, using evidence known to be false, and engaging in dishonesty, fraud, deceit or misrepresentation. On February 23, 2023, Judge Andrea Bouressa of the 471st District Court dismissed the petition, on the grounds of the commission failing to meet the burden of proof that Powell had indeed violated Texas's attorney code of conduct. In her decision, the judge also admonished the commission for not "properly labeling" the exhibits in its filing, which led to the consideration of only two of them.

== Political fundraising ==
In November 2020, Powell established Legal Defense Fund for the American Republic, a 501(c)(4) nonprofit organization with stated purpose to collect funds to help prosecute fraud in U.S. elections.

Powell launched Restore the Republic, a super PAC, in January 2021. In November 2021, The Washington Post reported that the preceding September federal prosecutors had issued a subpoena for the financial records of groups Powell had formed, including Defending the Republic, which was registered as a social welfare organization, and a political action committee by the same name. Days after the election, Powell created a website to raise funds for her new organization, referring to "Sidney Powell's Legal Defense Fund," asking donors to make checks payable to her law firm. The Daily Beast reported that the organization's board of directors initially included Michael Flynn and Lin Wood, and Patrick Byrne as CEO. All left the organization in April 2021 after Powell refused to allow it to be audited. In a recorded phone call with Wood that Byrne confirmed as authentic, Byrne asserted Powell was diverting donations to pay for her legal defense against defamation lawsuits. Defending the Republic raised $16.4 million in the year following the election. The group spent millions to fund the legal defense of the January 6 defendants; its expenditures, as well as reduced donations, substantially reduced DTR's cash on hand, but it still has more than $5 million as of November 2022. As a dark money group, Defending the Republic is not required to disclose its donors.

== Criminal charges and guilty plea ==
As part of the prosecution of Donald Trump in Georgia, on August 14, 2023, she was indicted by a grand jury for violating Georgia's Racketeer Influenced and Corrupt Organizations Act (RICO) statute along with 18 other alleged co-conspirators, including Trump himself. She was also charged with two counts of conspiracy to commit election fraud; and one count of each of the following conspiracies to commit: computer theft, computer trespass, computer invasion of privacy, and defraud the state—for a total of seven felony counts. Powell turned herself in at the Fulton County jail on August 23, 2023.

On October 19, 2023, Powell pleaded guilty to six misdemeanor counts related to her role in Trump's attempts to overturn the election and her own role in breaching electoral equipment security in Coffee County, Georgia. She agreed to a sentence of six years' probation, a $6,000 fine and $2,700 in restitution, and to write a letter of apology to the people of Georgia. She will also testify in other cases. Within a week, Trump claimed that Powell was "not my attorney, and never was", despite his November 2020 Twitter statement that "Sidney Powell ... [has been] added to our other wonderful lawyers and representatives".

Powell's guilty plea was generally analyzed in American news media as a major victory for prosecutors against Trump and his associates. Alan Feuer and Maggie Haberman of The New York Times noted Powell as the first time that prosecutors collaborated with a major co-conspirator of Trump's attempts to overturn the election. Both also noted the potential for Powell's guilty plea to legitimize other criminal charges against other figures involved in both Georgia's racketeering cases and Jack Smith's federal charges against Trump and his associates. David A. Graham of The Atlantic echoed these concerns, comparing the relationship between Powell's plea and the other figures charged in the Georgia racketeering case to the prisoner's dilemma. CNN analyst Marshall Cohen viewed the Powell plea as having the potential to incriminate anyone who worked with Powell during the attempts to overturn the election, though Cohen said that the plea deal in Georgia could open up Powell to prosecution by Jack Smith and a potential second plea deal with him, where she is alluded to as an unindicted co-conspirator. Alternatively, PBS News Georgia correspondent Stephen Fowler said Powell's testimony was potentially unreliable, and cited Trump's lawyer's assertion that Powell's testimony would exonerate the former president.

== Writing ==
Powell has written opinion pieces for The New York Observer, The Daily Caller, The Hill, National Review, Fox News, and media organizations and conservative content producers. She has written two published books:

- Powell, Sidney K. (May 1, 2014). Licensed to Lie: Exposing Corruption in the Department of Justice. Brown Books. ISBN 978-1-61254-149-5. OCLC 870288205.
- Powell, Sidney K.; Silverglate, Harvey A. (February 18, 2020). Conviction Machine: Standing Up to Federal Prosecutorial Abuse. Encounter Books. ISBN 978-1-59403-803-7. OCLC 1104857327.

In addition, she has published several journal articles on law practice. Examples include:

- Powell, Sidney (1988). "Federal Jurisdiction in Criminal Appeals—Appealable Orders in the Fifth Circuit". Texas Tech Law Review. 19 (3): 1003–1028.
- Powell, Sidney (1990). "Federal Appeals in the Fifth Circuit: Tips for the Texas Practitioner". Baylor Law Review. 42 (1): 97–140.
- Gabriel, Henry D; Powell, Sidney (1994). Federal Appellate Practice Guide: Fifth Circuit. Rochester, New York: Lawyers Cooperative Publishing. OCLC 30772185.

== Personal life and other ventures ==
Powell has a son from a marriage that ended in divorce "decades ago". In 2004, she founded a non-profit for victims of domestic violence. She has participated in volunteer work for women's shelters and other charities. Powell was not recalled as "being a staunch conservative or even very political" by people who interacted with her in those organizations. Powell served as executive producer on the 2013 drama Decoding Annie Parker, providing guidance to help bring the film to a commercial release. The film tells the story of Annie Parker and the discovery of the BRCA1 breast cancer gene. Powell oversaw fundraising screenings for the film that raised approximately $1 million for breast cancer charities.

== See also ==
- List of alleged Georgia election racketeers
- List of federal political scandals in the United States
- List of people granted executive clemency in the second Trump presidency
