= Timothy Batten =

American judge (born 1960)

Chief Judge of the United States District Court for the Northern District of Georgia
- In office May 8, 2021 – May 23, 2025
- Preceded by: Thomas W. Thrash Jr.
- Succeeded by: Leigh Martin May

Judge of the United States District Court for the Northern District of Georgia
- In office March 28, 2006 – May 23. 2025
- Appointed by: George W. Bush
- Preceded by: Willis B. Hunt Jr.
- Succeeded by: vacant

Personal details
- Born: Timothy Carroll Batten; 1960 (age 65–66) Atlanta, Georgia, U.S.
- Education: Georgia Institute of Technology (BS); University of Georgia (JD)

Timothy Carroll Batten Sr. (born 1960) is a former judge of the United States District Court for the Northern District of Georgia.

== Education and career ==
Batten was born in Atlanta. He received a Bachelor of Science degree summa cum laude in industrial management from Georgia Institute of Technology in 1981, and a Juris Doctor from the University of Georgia School of Law in 1984. He practiced with the firm of Schreeder, Wheeler & Flint in Atlanta from 1984 to 2006. His practice areas included medical malpractice, products liability, construction law, contracts, fraud, and personal injury law. He was lead counsel in over 25 civil trials that went to verdict as well as co-counsel on dozens of other jury trials.

== Federal judicial service ==
On September 28, 2005, Batten was nominated by President George W. Bush to a seat on the United States District Court for the Northern District of Georgia. Batten was confirmed by the United States Senate on March 6, 2006, and received his commission on March 28, 2006. He became the chief judge on May 8, 2021, after Thomas W. Thrash Jr. assumed senior status.

Batten retired from the court on May 23, 2025.

=== Notable cases ===
On November 25, 2020, Judge Batten was assigned Pearson v. Kemp, a lawsuit filed by pro-Trump attorney Sidney Powell alleging fraud in the 2020 presidential election. The case was dismissed from the bench by Batten on December 7, 2020.

== Sources ==
Legal offices
Preceded by Willis B. Hunt Jr.	Judge of the United States District Court for the Northern District of Georgia; 2006–2025	Vacant
Preceded by Thomas W. Thrash Jr.	Chief Judge of the United States District Court for the Northern District of Georgia; 2021–2025	Succeeded by Leigh Martin May
