= Nancy Abudu =

American judge (born 1974)

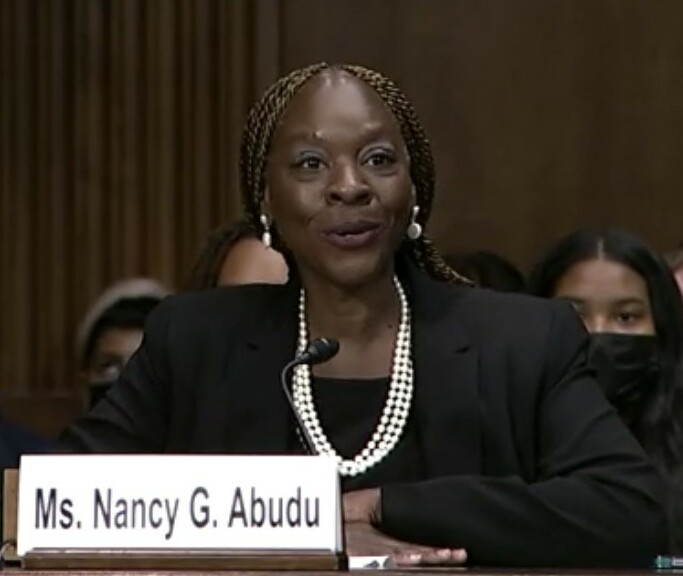

Judge of the United States Court of Appeals for the Eleventh Circuit
- Incumbent
- Assumed office May 26, 2023
- Appointed by: Joe Biden
- Preceded by: Beverly B. Martin

Personal details
- Born: Nancy Gbana Abudu; 1974 (age 51–52) Alexandria, Virginia, U.S.
- Education: Columbia University (BA); Tulane University (JD)

Nancy Gbana Abudu (born 1974) is an American lawyer from Georgia who serves as a United States circuit judge of the United States Court of Appeals for the Eleventh Circuit.

== Early life and education ==
Abudu was born and raised in Alexandria, Virginia, the daughter of immigrants from Ghana. Abudu was influenced by the Pan-Africanist movement politics of her parents, including her father's anti-apartheid activism in South Africa. After graduating from Mercersburg Academy in 1992, she earned a Bachelor of Arts degree from Columbia University in 1996 and a Juris Doctor from Tulane University Law School in 1999.

== Career ==
After law school, Abudu entered private practice at the law firm Skadden, Arps, Slate, Meagher & Flom from 1999 to 2001. From 2002 to 2004, she served as a staff attorney for the United States Court of Appeals for the Eleventh Circuit, where she focused on international law and public interest law. From 2005 to 2013, she was a staff attorney at the ACLU Voting Rights Project. From 2013 to 2019, she was the legal director for the American Civil Liberties Union of Florida. During her time with the ACLU, Abudu specialized in voting rights law. From 2019 to 2023, she worked as the deputy legal director and interim director for strategic litigation at the Southern Poverty Law Center.

=== Notable cases ===
- In 2009, Abudu was co-counsel for Debra L. Harvey and Catherine M. Beddard, who challenged Arizona's felon-restoration statute. Arizona's Constitution provides: "No person who is adjudicated an incapacitated person shall be qualified to vote at any election, nor shall any person convicted of treason or felony, be qualified to vote at any election unless restored to civil rights." The plaintiffs brought suits challenging Arizona's disenfranchisement scheme, arguing the law violated the Equal Protection Clause of the Fourteenth Amendment to the United States Constitution.
- In 2016, Abudu was co-counsel for The League of Women Voters of Florida in a lawsuit, claiming that the congressional redistricting plan adopted by the Florida Legislature violated Article III, Section 20 of the Florida Constitution, by "favoring the Republican Party and its incumbents." Article III, Section 20 was added to the Florida Constitution on November 2, 2010, following the general election and provides in subsection (a) that "[n]o apportionment plan or individual district shall be drawn with the intent to favor or disfavor a political party or an incumbent...."
- In 2017, Abudu was co-counsel for The Gainesville Woman Care LLC in a case against the state of Florida. They challenged the 2015 amendment to Florida's informed consent law for abortion that created a 24–hour waiting period.

=== Federal judicial service ===
On December 23, 2021, President Joe Biden announced his intent to nominate Abudu to serve as a United States circuit judge for the United States Court of Appeals for the Eleventh Circuit. On January 10, 2022, her nomination was sent to the Senate. President Biden nominated Abudu to the seat vacated by Judge Beverly B. Martin, who retired on September 30, 2021. On April 27, 2022, a hearing on her nomination was held before the Senate Judiciary Committee. Her nomination attracted intense Republican opposition due to Abudu's work for the Southern Poverty Law Center, which has labeled some of the Judiciary Committee's Republican members as "white supremacists". Fox News reported on an article she had written for the Southern Poverty Law Center in 2020, in which she compared felon disenfranchisement with the political disenfranchisement of slaves. On May 26, 2022, the committee failed to report her nomination by an 11–11 vote. On January 3, 2023, her nomination was returned to the President under Rule XXXI, Paragraph 6 of the United States Senate; she was renominated later the same day.

On February 9, 2023, her nomination was favorably reported by the committee by a party line 11–10 vote. Abudu did not receive any Republican support in the committee because Republicans questioned whether her advocacy work would prevent her from being impartial on the bench. On May 15, 2023, Majority Leader Chuck Schumer filed cloture on her nomination. On May 17, 2023, the Senate invoked cloture on her nomination by a 50–48 vote. On May 18, 2023, her nomination was confirmed by a 49–47 vote, with Senator Joe Manchin being the only Democrat to vote against confirmation. Senator Manchin's no vote was the first time any Democrat had voted against one of President Biden's judicial nominees. She received her judicial commission on May 26, 2023. Abudu is the first African American woman to sit on the Eleventh Circuit.

== See also ==
- Joe Biden judicial appointment controversies
- Joe Biden Supreme Court candidates
- List of African American federal judges
- List of African American jurists

Legal offices
Preceded by Beverly B. Martin	Judge of the United States Court of Appeals for the Eleventh Circuit; 2023–present	Incumbent
