= Thomas W. Thrash Jr. =

American judge (born 1951)

Senior Judge of the United States District Court for the Northern District of Georgia
- Incumbent
- Assumed office May 8, 2021

Chief Judge of the United States District Court for the Northern District of Georgia
- In office July 31, 2014 – May 8, 2021
- Preceded by: Julie E. Carnes
- Succeeded by: Timothy Batten

Judge of the United States District Court for the Northern District of Georgia
- In office August 1, 1997 – May 8, 2021
- Appointed by: Bill Clinton
- Preceded by: Robert L. Vining Jr.
- Succeeded by: Victoria Calvert

Personal details
- Born: Thomas Woodrow Thrash Jr. May 8, 1951 (age 75) Birmingham, Alabama, U.S.
- Children: 2, including Maggie Thrash
- Education: University of Virginia (BA); Harvard University (JD)

Thomas Woodrow Thrash Jr. (born May 8, 1951) is a Senior Judge of the United States District Court for the Northern District of Georgia.

== Biography ==
Thrash was born in Birmingham, Alabama in 1951. He received a Bachelor of Arts degree from the University of Virginia in 1973 and a Juris Doctor from Harvard Law School in 1976. He was in private practice in Atlanta, Georgia from 1976 to 1977. He was then an assistant district attorney of Fulton County District Attorney's Office until 1980. He resumed his private practice in Atlanta from 1981 to 1997. He was a Law professor at Georgia State University from 1986 to 1997 teaching a trial practice class. During this time, he also served as counsel to the Democratic Party of Georgia and authored Handbook of Georgia Campaign Finance and Disclosure Law.

== Federal judicial service ==
On January 7, 1997, Thrash was nominated by President Bill Clinton to a seat on the United States District Court for the Northern District of Georgia vacated by Robert L. Vining Jr. Thrash was confirmed by the United States Senate on July 31, 1997, and received his commission on August 1, 1997. He became Chief Judge on July 31, 2014. He assumed senior status on May 8, 2021.

== Notable cases ==
In November 1997, Thrash ruled in favor of the Upper Chattahoochee Riverkeeper Fund in their lawsuit against the City of Atlanta for violating the Clean Water Act and the Georgia Water Quality Control Act in polluting the Chattahoochee river. As a result, the City of Atlanta paid over $3 billion to clean up the city's sewer system.

In June 2011, Thrash issued an injunction preventing some of an immigration law in Georgia from going into effect. The case was brought by the Georgia Latino Alliance for Human Rights and others against the Governor of Georgia, Nathan Deal, et al. Thrash struck down the portions of the law that prevented the knowing transport or shelter of illegal aliens, and allowing police to investigate the immigration status of suspects without identification.

Thrash oversaw the case resulting from the 2017 Equifax data breach resulting in the largest settlement to date from a U.S. data breach. On January 13, 2020, Thrash granted final approval of a $1.5 billion dollar settlement that included $425 million in consumer relief and over $1 billion in mandated security upgrades.

== Personal life ==
Thrash has been married since 1981 to Meg Thrash, a former practicing lawyer. They have a son and a daughter who are both writers. In 2025, Thrash published a book titled Shakespeare Legally Speaking: The Law in Shakespeare's Plays that draws upon his five decades in the legal profession to explore the law in Shakespeare's plays.

== Undisclosed luxury travel ==
In May 2024, NPR revealed that Thrash had received free travel in December 2021 to the Breakers Colloquium, a privately funded legal seminar hosted at The Breakers resort in Palm Beach, Florida, but had failed to disclose this on his required annual financial disclosure report for that year, in violation of federal law. In response, a representative of Thrash told NPR, "No comment." In other years, Thrash did disclose reimbursements for travel to judicial conferences suggesting that the failure to report the trip to the legal seminar in 2021 was an oversight.

== Sources ==
Legal offices
Preceded by Robert L. Vining Jr.	Judge of the United States District Court for the Northern District of Georgia; 1997–2021	Succeeded by Victoria Calvert
Preceded by Julie E. Carnes	Chief Judge of the United States District Court for the Northern District of Georgia; 2014–2021	Succeeded by Timothy Batten
