= R. Lanier Anderson III =

American judge (born 1936)

Lanier Anderson
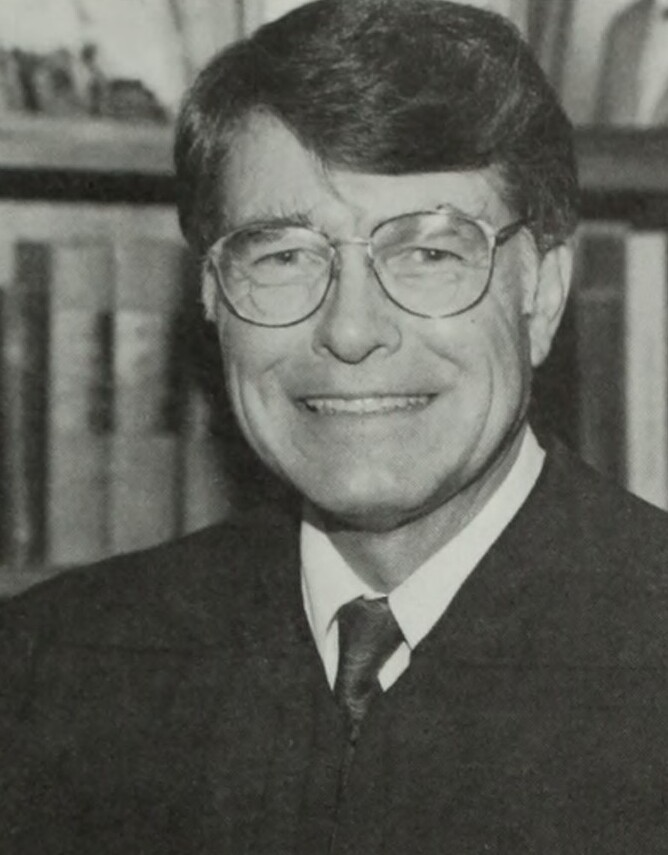

Senior Judge of the United States Court of Appeals for the Eleventh Circuit
- Incumbent
- Assumed office January 31, 2009

Chief Judge of the United States Court of Appeals for the Eleventh Circuit
- In office May 14, 1999 – May 31, 2002
- Preceded by: Joseph W. Hatchett
- Succeeded by: James Larry Edmondson

Judge of the United States Court of Appeals for the Eleventh Circuit
- In office October 1, 1981 – January 31, 2009
- Appointed by: Operation of law
- Preceded by: Seat established
- Succeeded by: Beverly B. Martin

Judge of the United States Court of Appeals for the Fifth Circuit
- In office July 13, 1979 – October 1, 1981
- Appointed by: Jimmy Carter
- Preceded by: Seat established
- Succeeded by: Seat abolished

Personal details
- Born: Robert Lanier Anderson III; November 12, 1936 (age 89) Macon, Georgia, U.S.
- Education: Yale University (BA); Harvard University (LLB)

Robert Lanier Anderson III (born November 12, 1936) is a senior United States circuit judge of the United States Court of Appeals for the Eleventh Circuit.

== Early life and education ==
Born on November 12, 1936, in Macon, Georgia, Robert Lanier Anderson III was named for his father and grandfather; his grandfather had been named for Robert Sampson Lanier, the brother-in-law and longtime law partner of his great-grandfather, Clifford Anderson. Robert Lanier and Clifford Anderson started the firm with which all four generations practiced and which, dating from the 1840s and having gone through several iterations, is the second oldest continuous practice in the state of Georgia. Robert Sampson Lanier, was the father of noted poet and musician Sidney Lanier. After graduating from Bibb County, Georgia public schools Anderson earned an Artium Baccalaureus degree from Yale College in 1958, and a Bachelor of Laws from Harvard Law School in 1961.

== Professional career ==
A fourth-generation Macon lawyer, Anderson began private practice in his hometown in 1961. He fulfilled his military obligation as a lieutenant in the United States Army from 1961 until 1963, stationed on a Nike Site in Denbigh, Virginia, being discharged as a captain in the reserves in 1965. Anderson had by then returned to private legal practice in Macon, where he worked from 1963 until 1979. He practiced at the family firm of Anderson Walker & Reichert, concentrating most of his efforts on tax and estate planning. Among other civic activities he served on the Bibb County Board of Education from 1968 to 1974.

== Federal judicial service ==
Anderson was nominated by President Jimmy Carter on April 18, 1979, to the United States Court of Appeals for the Fifth Circuit, to a new seat authorized by 92 Stat. 1629. He was confirmed by the United States Senate on July 12, 1979, and received his commission on July 13, 1979. His service terminated on October 1, 1981, due to reassignment to the Eleventh Circuit.

Anderson was reassigned by operation of law on October 1, 1981, to the United States Court of Appeals for the Eleventh Circuit, to a new seat authorized by 94 Stat. 1994. He served as Chief Judge from May 17, 1999, to May 31, 2002. In July 2008, Anderson told President George W. Bush of his intention to assume senior status effective January 31, 2009. However, word did not become public of his decision until November 2008. Anderson told a local newspaper that he still planned to work "almost full-time" but that he hoped to take more vacation time—probably four to six weeks a year—to visit grandchildren in New York and Connecticut. And while Anderson could have taken senior status in November 2001, he chose not to do so, he told the paper, because "I was having so much fun, I didn't want to." He assumed senior status on January 31, 2009.

== Cases and controversies ==
In 1986, Anderson became the subject of an impeachment drive after a three-judge panel on which he sat ordered retrials for several convicted murderers because, they ruled, pretrial publicity had unfairly tainted their trials.

In 1999, Anderson penned a noted ruling in favor of the estate of Martin Luther King Jr. in a copyright fight with CBS over King's famous "I Have a Dream" speech.

In 2004, Anderson dissented when the 11th circuit refused to rehear a case. The majority had ruled in favor of a law banning LGBTQ couples from adopting children. The vote was 6-6, which warranted a denial of en banc. Anderson's dissent was joined by Judge Dubina.

In 2008, Anderson described himself as a judicial "moderate," and added that he "would like to be thought of as a judge who had no particular agenda and who took each case on the facts and applied the law that the Supreme Court laid down," regardless of his own personal view on it. "And I think that's what I attempt to do, and I think every judge on our court does."

In February 2020, Anderson was a member of a 3-judge panel in Jones et al. v. DeSantis, a 2020 voting rights case. 2018 Florida Amendment 4 permitted former felons to vote, however DeSantis signed a law that required former felons to pay all legal fees before being eligible to vote again, despite some of them not knowing how much they owed. District judge Robert Hinkle struck down that law, and the panel kept the injunction against the law. However, the panel was reversed in a sharply divided en banc decision that September.

== See also ==
- List of United States federal judges by longevity of service

Legal offices
New seat	Judge of the United States Court of Appeals for the Fifth Circuit; 1979–1981	Seat abolished
New seat	Judge of the United States Court of Appeals for the Eleventh Circuit; 1981–2009	Succeeded by Beverly B. Martin
Preceded by Joseph W. Hatchett	Chief Judge of the United States Court of Appeals for the Eleventh Circuit; 1999–2002	Succeeded by James Larry Edmondson
