= Maggie Thrash =

American young adult fiction author and memoirist

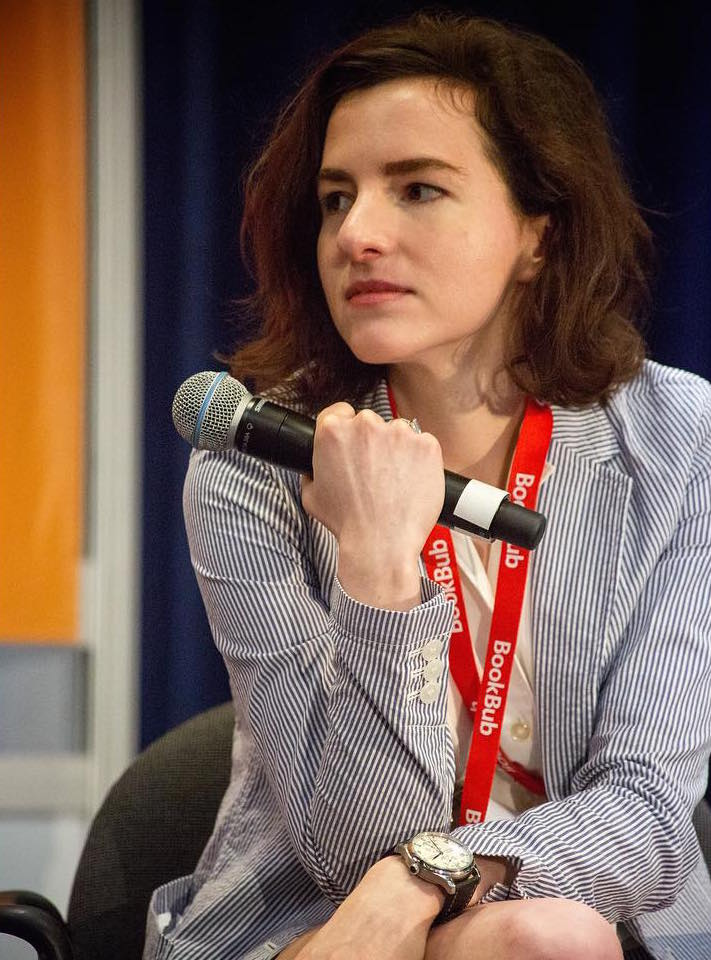
- Thrash at a 2015 BookExpo America panel
- Born: Margaret Thrash; Atlanta, Georgia, U.S.
- Education: Hampshire College
- Occupation: Author
- Relatives: Thomas W. Thrash Jr. (father)
- Writing career
- Language: English
- Period: 2015–present
- Genre: Young adult
- Notable work: Honor Girl
- Website: www.maggiethrash.com

Margaret Thrash is an American writer of young adult fiction and memoirist, best known for her graphic novel memoir Honor Girl.

Honor Girl, Thrash's first book, was published by Candlewick Press in 2015. The book describes her early life as a teenager coming out as a lesbian while attending conservative summer camp. It received strongly favorable reviews and was named a finalist for the 2016 Los Angeles Times Book Prize in the Graphic Novel/Comics category. Her follow-up memoir, Lost Soul Be At Peace, published in 2018, explores a period of teen depression and her relationships with her family, notably her father, a federal judge.

Thrash has also written two books in a mystery series for young adults. The first book called Strange Truth (formerly We Know It Was You) was published in 2016 by the Simon Pulse imprint of Simon & Schuster. The sequel, Strange Lies, was published in October 2017.

Harper Perennial published Thrash's adult debut Rainbow Black on March 19, 2024. The novel was described by The Washington Post as "Part mystery, part unsparing social commentary and part queer love story, Lacey’s personal history reads a little like Demon Copperhead’s — if he were a lesbian in New Hampshire." It is a finalist in the fiction category for the 2024 New England Book Awards.

Thrash currently lives in New Hampshire. She was a frequent contributor to Rookie, a (now defunct) online magazine for teenage girls.
