= Beverly B. Martin =

American judge (born 1955)

Beverly Martin
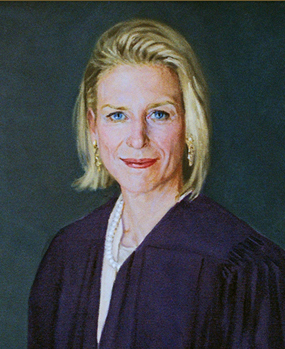

Judge of the United States Court of Appeals for the Eleventh Circuit
- In office January 28, 2010 – September 30, 2021
- Appointed by: Barack Obama
- Preceded by: R. Lanier Anderson III
- Succeeded by: Nancy Abudu

Judge of the United States District Court for the Northern District of Georgia
- In office August 3, 2000 – February 1, 2010
- Appointed by: Bill Clinton
- Preceded by: George Ernest Tidwell
- Succeeded by: Leigh Martin May

Personal details
- Born: August 7, 1955 (age 71) Macon, Georgia, U.S.
- Party: Democratic
- Education: Stetson University (BA); University of Georgia (JD)

Beverly Baldwin Martin (born August 7, 1955) is a former United States circuit judge of the United States Court of Appeals for the Eleventh Circuit and a former United States District Judge of the United States District Court for the Northern District of Georgia.

== Early life and education ==
Born in Macon, Georgia, Martin graduated from Stratford Academy in 1973 before attending Mercer University for one year from 1972 to 1973. She subsequently transferred to Stetson University and received a Bachelor of Arts degree in 1976. She earned a Juris Doctor from University of Georgia School of Law in 1981.

== Professional career ==
Martin was in private practice with the firm of Martin Snow, LLP in Georgia from 1981 to 1984, and was also an assistant attorney general in the State Law Department of the Office of Attorney General of Georgia from 1984 to 1994. She was an Assistant United States Attorney for the Middle District of Georgia from 1994 to 1997 and United States Attorney for the Middle District of Georgia from 1997 to 2000.

== Federal judicial service ==
=== Northern District of Georgia ===
On the recommendation of Senator Max Cleland, Martin was nominated on March 27, 2000, by President Bill Clinton to a seat on the United States District Court for the Northern District of Georgia vacated by George Ernest Tidwell. She was confirmed by the United States Senate on June 16, 2000, and received her commission on August 3, 2000. Her service terminated on February 1, 2010, due to elevation to the court of appeals.

=== United States Court of Appeals for the Eleventh Circuit ===
On June 19, 2009, President Barack Obama nominated Martin to a seat on the United States Court of Appeals for the Eleventh Circuit vacated by Judge R. Lanier Anderson III, who assumed senior status on January 31, 2009. The United States Senate confirmed Martin's nomination by a 97–0 vote on January 20, 2010. She received her commission on January 28, 2010.

She retired from active service on September 30, 2021. On October 4, 2021, Martin became the executive director at the New York University School of Law's Center on Civil Justice.

=== Notable decision as a circuit judge ===
In June 2020, Martin dissented when the divided panel vacated a lower court's injunction ordering the Miami-Dade County Corrections and Rehabilitation Department to enforce social distancing and take other preventative measures to protect prisoners from COVID-19.

In September 2020, Martin dissented when the en banc majority upheld a statute imposing additional financial obligations upon felons seeking reenfranchisement under a recent ballot initiative.

In November 2020, Martin dissented when the majority found that a municipality’s ban on minor conversion therapy violated the First Amendment to the United States Constitution.

== Sources ==
- Beverly Martin at Ballotpedia

Legal offices
Preceded by James Wiggins	United States Attorney for the Middle District of Georgia; 1997–2000	Succeeded by Maxwell Wood
Preceded by George Ernest Tidwell	Judge of the United States District Court for the Northern District of Georgia; 2000–2010	Succeeded by Leigh Martin May
Preceded by R. Lanier Anderson III	Judge of the United States Court of Appeals for the Eleventh Circuit; 2010–2021	Succeeded by Nancy Abudu
