= Bijan Kian =

Iranian-American businessman (born 1952)

- بیژن کیان
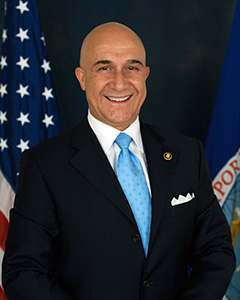
- Born: Bijan Rafiekian; January 15, 1952 (age 74); Tehran, Iran
- Education: Tehran Industrial College (BS); University of Brighton (DMS)
- Known for: Board member, Export–Import Bank of the United States; association with Flynn Intel Group and related U.S. criminal proceedings (2018–2023)
- Political party: Republican

Bijan Kian; born January 15, 1952), also known as Bijan Rafiekian, is an Iranian-American businessman. He served as a member of the board of directors of the Export–Import Bank of the United States (Ex-Im Bank). He later became a business partner of retired U.S. Army lieutenant general Michael Flynn in the Flynn Intel Group. Kian was indicted in 2018 on charges related to acting as an unregistered agent of a foreign government and conspiracy, arising from lobbying and influence work connected to Turkish interests; after a multi-year sequence of trial and appeals, the U.S. Department of Justice moved to dismiss the case, and the district court dismissed the indictment with prejudice in 2023.

== Early life and education ==
Kian was born in Tehran in 1952. He has reported earning a bachelor's degree from Tehran Industrial College and a post-graduate diploma in management studies (DMS) from the University of Brighton.

== Career ==
=== Export–Import Bank of the United States ===
Kian was nominated by President George W. Bush to the board of directors of the Export–Import Bank of the United States and was confirmed by the U.S. Senate in 2006. The Ex-Im Bank stated that he was nominated on July 20, 2006 and confirmed on September 29, 2006. Bush later announced an intent to nominate him for an additional term expiring in January 2011.

=== Flynn Intel Group and transition work ===
Kian became associated with Michael Flynn through the Flynn Intel Group (FIG), a consulting and lobbying firm. Reporting in 2017 described Kian as a transition-era aide and as part of Flynn-related work connected to Turkey and to criticism of U.S.-based cleric Fethullah Gülen. In later appellate litigation, the Fourth Circuit summarized evidence about FIG’s 2016 project discussions involving Turkish businessman Ekim Alptekin and work related to Gülen.

== Criminal case and legal proceedings ==
=== Indictment (2018) ===
On December 17, 2018, the U.S. Department of Justice announced an indictment charging Kian and Kamil Ekim Alptekin with conspiracy and acting as an agent of a foreign government without prior notification to the U.S. Attorney General, in connection with efforts tied to Turkey and to Gülen. Contemporary coverage described the case as arising from the broader special counsel investigation ecosystem and focusing on foreign-agent/lobbying conduct linked to Turkey’s interest in Gülen’s extradition.

=== Trial and jury verdict (2019) ===
Kian pleaded not guilty. Trial began in July 2019 in the Eastern District of Virginia. A jury convicted him on charges including acting as an unregistered agent of a foreign government and conspiracy.

=== Post-trial rulings and appeals (2019–2023) ===
In September 2019, the district judge granted a judgment of acquittal after the verdict, citing insufficient evidence, and also issued conditional rulings concerning a potential new trial if the acquittal were reversed on appeal.

In March 2021, the U.S. Court of Appeals for the Fourth Circuit reinstated the jury’s guilty verdict and remanded the matter for further proceedings, a decision the Justice Department publicly described as upholding the conviction.

In May 2023, the Fourth Circuit issued a published opinion addressing the case on appeal for a second time, summarizing the procedural posture and affirming the district court’s grant of a new trial based on the weight of evidence analysis after remand.

=== Dismissal with prejudice (2023) ===
On September 11, 2023, federal prosecutors dropped the charges; press reports described the decision as ending the five-year prosecution and noted that a retrial had been scheduled for later in 2023. Public docket reporting indicates the district court entered an order dismissing the indictment with prejudice, preventing further prosecution on the same charges. A statement from Kian’s counsel characterized the dismissal as a concession by the Justice Department; this characterization has been reported in the press and in the law firm’s press release.

== See also ==
- Michael Flynn
- Flynn Intel Group
- Kamil Ekim Alptekin
- Foreign Agents Registration Act
- Fethullah Gülen
- Special Counsel investigation (2017–2019)
