= Richard G. Callahan =

American attorney

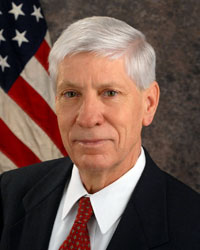

United States Attorney for the Eastern District of Missouri
- In office January 22, 2010 – March 10, 2017
- President: Barack Obama; Donald Trump
- Preceded by: Michael Reap (Acting)
- Succeeded by: Jeffrey Jensen

Personal details
- Born: April 22, 1947 (age 79)
- Party: Democratic
- Education: Georgetown University (BA, JD)

Richard G. Callahan (born April 22, 1947) is an American attorney who served as the United States Attorney for the Eastern District of Missouri from 2010 to 2017.

In 2018, Callahan again became a judge in Cole County, Missouri.

== See also ==
- 2017 dismissal of U.S. attorneys
