= Leigh Martin May =

American judge from Georgia (born 1971)

Leigh May
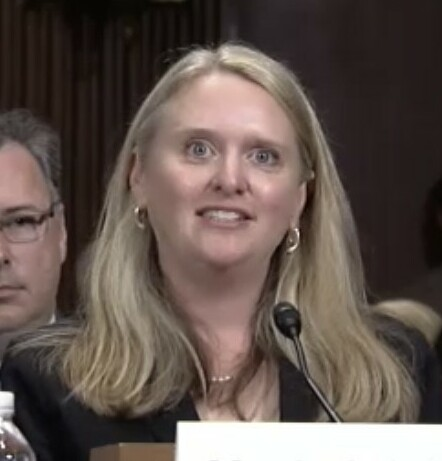
- May in 2014

Chief Judge of the United States District Court for the Northern District of Georgia
- Incumbent
- Assumed office May 24, 2025
- Preceded by: Timothy Batten

Judge of the United States District Court for the Northern District of Georgia
- Incumbent
- Assumed office November 14, 2014
- Appointed by: Barack Obama
- Preceded by: Beverly B. Martin

Personal details
- Born: Leigh Holladay Martin; 1971 (age 54–55) Albany, Georgia, U.S.
- Party: Democratic
- Education: Georgia Institute of Technology (BS); University of Georgia (JD)

Leigh Martin May (née Leigh Holladay Martin; born 1971) is the chief United States district judge of the United States District Court for the Northern District of Georgia.

== Biography ==
May received a Bachelor of Science degree, cum laude, in 1993 from the Georgia Institute of Technology. She received a Juris Doctor, magna cum laude, in 1998 from University of Georgia School of Law. From 1994 to 1995 she was a consultant to Electronic Data Systems. From 1995 to 1998 she was a law clerk and later Editor-in-Chief of the Georgia Law Review at the University of Georgia School of Law. From 1996 to 1997 she was in private practice in Atlanta and Valdosta. From 1998 to 2000, she served as a law clerk to Judge Dudley Hollingsworth Bowen Jr. of the United States District Court for the Southern District of Georgia. From 1999 to 2004 she was a bar examination grader for the Georgia Office of Bar Admissions. From 2000 to 2014, she was a partner at the Atlanta office of the law firm of Butler, Wooten & Fryhofer LLP, where her practice focused on complex civil litigation in both state and federal courts. She was formerly the Vice Chair of the Litigation Section of the Atlanta Bar Association.

=== Federal judicial service ===
On December 19, 2013, President Barack Obama nominated May to serve as a United States district judge of the United States District Court for the Northern District of Georgia, to the seat vacated by Judge Beverly B. Martin, who was elevated to the United States Court of Appeals for the Eleventh Circuit on February 1, 2010. She received a hearing before the full panel of the United States Senate Judiciary Committee on May 13, 2014. On June 19, 2014, her nomination was reported out of committee by voice vote. On September 18, 2014, Senate Majority Leader Harry Reid filed for cloture on her nomination. On Wednesday, November 12, 2014, the United States Senate invoked cloture on her nomination by a 67–30 vote. On Thursday, November 13, 2014, her nomination was confirmed by a 99–0 vote. She received her judicial commission on November 14, 2014. She became the chief judge on May 24, 2025.

Legal offices
Preceded by Beverly B. Martin	Judge of the United States District Court for the Northern District of Georgia; 2014–present	Incumbent
Preceded by Timothy Batten	Chief Judge of the United States District Court for the Northern District of Georgia; 2025–present	Incumbent
