= Victoria Calvert =

American judge (born 1981)

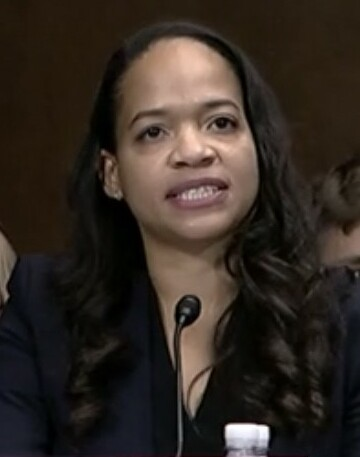

Judge of the United States District Court for the Northern District of Georgia
- Incumbent
- Assumed office April 5, 2022
- Appointed by: Joe Biden
- Preceded by: Thomas W. Thrash Jr.

Personal details
- Born: Victoria Marie Stubbs; 1981 (age 44–45) New York City, U.S.
- Education: Duke University (BA); New York University (JD)

Victoria Marie Calvert (née Stubbs, born 1981) is an American lawyer from Georgia who is a United States district judge of the United States District Court for the Northern District of Georgia.

== Early life ==
Calvert was born Victoria Marie Stubbs, the daughter of Eddie Stubbs, a truck driver, and Sherrie (nee' Welch) Stubbs. Her surname changed after her father died when she was five years old.

Calvert earned a Bachelor of Arts from Duke University in 2003 and a Juris Doctor from the New York University School of Law in 2006.

== Career ==
From 2006 to 2012, Calvert was an associate at King & Spalding in Atlanta, where she represented clients in the Special Matters and Government Investigations group. From 2012 to 2022, she was a staff attorney in the federal public defender program in Atlanta.

=== Notable cases ===
Calvert was part of the legal team for Nicholas Bryant, who challenged the death sentence he received for murder during an armed robbery. The Georgia Supreme Court reversed his death sentence.

In 2020, Calvert unsuccessfully challenged her client Titus Bates's conviction for shooting a U.S. Marshals Service task force officer who was attempting to serve him with a warrant. Calvert argued that assaulting a police officer with a dangerous weapon did not qualify as a predicate crime of violence.

== Federal judicial service ==
On September 30, 2021, President Joe Biden nominated Calvert to serve as a United States district judge of the United States District Court for the Northern District of Georgia. President Biden nominated Calvert to the seat vacated by Judge Thomas W. Thrash Jr., who assumed senior status on May 8, 2021. On December 1, 2021, a hearing on her nomination was held before the Senate Judiciary Committee. On January 3, 2022, her nomination was returned to the President under Rule XXXI, Paragraph 6 of the United States Senate; she was later renominated the same day. On January 20, 2022, her nomination was reported out of committee by a 13–9 vote. On March 16, 2022, the Senate invoked cloture on her nomination by a 52–46 vote. On March 22, 2022, her nomination was confirmed by a 50–46 vote. She received her judicial commission on April 5, 2022. She became the second Black female judge on the U.S. District Court for the Northern District of Georgia.

== See also ==
- List of African-American federal judges
- List of African-American jurists

Legal offices
Preceded by Thomas W. Thrash Jr.	Judge of the United States District Court for the Northern District of Georgia; 2022–present	Incumbent
