= Honor Girl =

2015 Graphic novel memoir by Maggie Thrash

- Author: Maggie Thrash
- Language: English
- Genre: Graphic novel, memoir
- Publisher: Candlewick Press
- Publication date: September 8, 2015
- Publication place: United States
- Media type: Print (hardback)
- Pages: 267 pages
- ISBN: 9780763673826
- OCLC: 900179959

Honor Girl is a graphic novel memoir written and illustrated by Maggie Thrash. The book was first published in 2015 through Candlewick Press.

== Development and publication history ==
Thrash wrote Honor Girl over the span of two years. While their previous experience was in writing prose rather than graphic novels, a roommate encouraged them to use the latter form for this particular story. Thrash was interested in the possibilities offered by depicting themself visually and began practising drawing so that they could pursue the graphic format.

Candlewick Press published Honor Girl on September 8, 2015.

== Synopsis ==
Honor Girl is the story of writer's Maggie Thrash's first crush at an all-girls summer camp in Kentucky in 2000.

== Reception and awards ==
The New York Times Book Review called the story "sweet and obsessive and dead on," and found that "Thrash shows an impressive grasp of the language of comics." In its starred review, Kirkus Reviews called the book a "luminescent memoir not to be missed." Honor Girl also received starred reviews from School Library Journal, Publishers Weekly and Kirkus Reviews, and was an official "Junior Library Guild Selection" for Fall 2015. Honor Girl was a finalist for the 2016 Los Angeles Times Book Prize in the Graphic Novel/Comics category.
