= Jeffrey Jensen =

American attorney (born 1965/66)

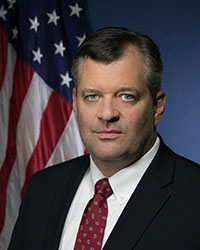

United States Attorney for the Eastern District of Missouri
- In office October 6, 2017 – December 30, 2020
- President: Donald Trump
- Preceded by: Richard G. Callahan
- Succeeded by: Sayler A. Fleming

Personal details
- Born: 1965 or 1966 (age 59–60) St. Louis, Missouri, U.S.
- Education: Indiana University School of Business (BA in 1988); Saint Louis University (JD)

Jeffrey Jensen is an American attorney who served as the United States Attorney for the United States District Court for the Eastern District of Missouri from 2017 to 2020.

== Private sector career ==
Before serving as U.S. Attorney, Jensen was a partner at Husch Blackwell LLP, a position to which he returned in 2021. In September 2024, Jensen joined Torridon Law, PLLC as a partner. Jensen has represented clients in many high-profile civil, regulatory, and criminal matters. He has been recognized by Benchmark Litigation as a Local Litigation Star in 2023 and 2024; The Best Lawyers in America®; Chambers USA; Privacy and Data Security Law, Litigation: White Collar Crime & Government Investigations, 2022-2024; and Martindale-Hubbell AV Preeminent. Prior to his legal career, he served as a Certified Public Accountant for PricewaterhouseCoopers.

== Government career ==
Jensen was a Federal Bureau of Investigation special agent from 1989 to 1999. In 1999, he became an Assistant United States Attorney in the Eastern District of Missouri. He was an Executive United States Attorney from 2005 to 2009, leaving that position to start his own law firm. He received The Founders Award from the Federal Bureau of Investigation Agents Association in 2015.

=== United States Attorney (2017-2020) ===
In 2017, Jensen was named U.S. Attorney for the Eastern District of Missouri, where he led a team of more than 70 attorneys. He oversaw thousands of federal criminal prosecutions and civil enforcement actions in the District, including cases involving public corruption, white collar crime, organized crime, terrorism, the False Claims Act, narcotics, and firearms, as well as a variety of cybersecurity attacks, such as computer intrusion and ransomware.

In 2020, Jensen was chosen by Attorney General William Barr to conduct a review of the Department of Justice's case against former National Security Advisor Michael Flynn in the United States v. Flynn case. In this position, he recommended that the federal government drop its case against Flynn.

Jensen also served on the Attorney General's Advisory Committee (AGAC) during his time in office, a group of U.S. Attorneys from various districts chosen by the Attorney General to advise on nationwide priorities.

As is customary at a presidential transition, Jensen resigned as a United States Attorney on December 30, 2020.
