= Flynn Intel Group =

Lobbying group

The Flynn Intel Group is a lobbying group established by Michael Flynn in October 2014. Flynn registered the company from the home of his friend Stanley A. McChrystal, a "fellow general-turned-consultant."

Kamil Ekim Alptekin, a Turkish businessman close to Recep Tayyip Erdoğan, Turkey's leader, is a client of Flynn Intel Group. Inovo, a company owned by Alptekin, paid the Flynn Intel Group $530,000 to investigate Fethullah Gülen, a U.S.-resident cleric who is wanted by the Turkish government. The group's failure to register as a foreign agent after accepting this contract was among the activities examined by Robert Mueller's 2017 Special Counsel investigation.

Subsidiaries of the Flynn Intel Group include FIG Cyber Inc and FIG Aviation. They are headed by Timothy Newberry and Mike Coomes. Other employees included Flynn's son, Michael G. Flynn, who served as his father's chief of staff.

The group's House Identification number is 433680001 and Senate Identification number is 401104161.

== See also ==
- Reza Zarrab
