= Kamil Ekim Alptekin =

Turkish businessman (born 1977)

- Born: 1977 (age 48–49); Ankara
- Education: Utrecht University
- Occupation: Businessman

Kamil Ekim Alptekin (born 1977) is a Turkish businessman with real estate, aerospace, and consulting interests. He is the current Chairman of the Turkey-U.S. Business Council (TAİK) and an advocate for improved Turkish-American relations. His payments to Michael T. Flynn for research and lobbying work against the Gülen movement were central to a political controversy in American politics. Alptekin was indicted on December 12, 2018 on charges of conspiring to act as an agent of a foreign government and making false statements to investigators. These charges were eventually dropped.

== Early life and education ==
Alptekin was born in Ankara. His father Mustafa Sevinç was a bureaucrat, and his mother Zehra, a teacher. Kamil Ekim was born in Ankara but mostly raised in the Netherlands, his parents left Turkey in 1981, when Alptekin was 4. He studied law and economics at Utrecht University, graduating in 2001.

== Career ==
He received a nine-month fellowship to work as a staffer on the United States House Committee on Foreign Affairs and for Representative Tom Lantos. He later worked for the Democrats 66 parliamentary group at the States General of the Netherlands in The Hague. He held a one year fellowship at the INTERPOL Counter-Terrorism Fusion Centre in Lyon. He was a senior fellow with the Humanity in Action non-profit, and founder of the Frieda Menco Foundation.

In 2005 Alptekin began a business providing counter-terrorism equipment and consulting services to the government of Turkey, including video surveillance cameras for police helicopters. He is involved in real estate development along the Bosphorus Strait in Istanbul.

He serves as an Honorary Consul to the Republic of Albania.

=== Eclipse ===
When Eclipse Aviation Corporation filed for bankruptcy, Alptekin and his partners attempted to buy it out with financing provided by the Russian state bank Vnesheconombank and a loan personally approved by Vladimir Putin. The Russian government financing ultimately fell through, and instead Alptekin and his partners bought Eclipse Aviation for $40 million, using it to found Eclipse Aerospace. Under Alptekin, Eclipse Aerospace began producing the Eclipse 550 very light jet, partnering with Sikorsky Aircraft.

=== Inovo BV ===
Inovo BV, the Dutch corporation he owns, is the sole Turkish representative in Ratio Oil Exploration, which is the Israeli firm exploring the Leviathan gas field in the Mediterranean Sea. Ratio has denied that it has any affiliation with Alptekin or Inovo BV, though BuzzFeed News has produced evidence documenting a relationship dating back to at least early 2016.

== Lobbying against Gülenism ==
Following the 2016 Turkish coup d'état attempt, Alptekin began soliciting lobbyists in the United States in order to reduce support for Fethullah Gülen and the Gülen movement. One of those firms was Flynn Intel Group, which was paid at least $530,000 for its efforts.

According to U.S. prosecutors, Alptekin and Bijan Rafiekian worked on behalf of the Government of Turkey in order to secure Gülen's extradition.

=== Investigation and charges ===
As part of his investigation of Russian interference in the 2016 United States elections, special prosecutor Robert Mueller assumed control of a Virginia-based grand jury criminal probe into the relationship between Flynn and Alptekin's Inovo BV.

In December 2018, Alptekin and Bijan Rafiekian were indicted on charges of a conspiracy to violate federal lobbying rules, and Alptekin was also charged with making false statements to FBI investigators.

In April 2019, Alptekin was referred to in the Report on the Investigation into Russian Interference in the 2016 Presidential Election, otherwise known as the Mueller Report. The report cited the result of the United States v. Bijan Rafiekian and Kamil Ekim Alptekin as a part of the criminal conduct of Michael Flynn.

On 11 September 2023 the Prosecutors ultimately decided to drop all charges.

In January 2025, Alptekin alleged on a Twitter Spaces broadcast that Jim Biden had approached him in April 2023 with an offer to make his legal troubles disappear on the condition that he pay $3 million to hire Eric Holder as his attorney and that he change his testimony about Flynn.

== See also ==
- Mueller Report
- Reza Zarrab
