= Ministerial act =

In United States law, a ministerial act is a government action "performed according to legal authority, established procedures or instructions from a superior, without exercising any individual judgment." It can be any act a functionary or bureaucrat performs in a prescribed manner, without exercising any individual judgment or discretion. Under law, this would be classified under the rubric of public policy.

== Examples of what is, and is not, ministerial ==
Examples of ministerial acts include:

- the entry of an order of the court by a clerk of the court,
- notarization (acknowledgement) by a notary public,
- mechanical processing of an income tax return
- determining the existence of facts and applying them as required by law, without any discretion
- issuance of a building permit
- approval of a subdivision real estate
- approval of a demolition permit
- a court's remand for "the correction of language in a judgment or the entry of a judgment in accordance with a mandate"

Actions that are not ministerial would include:

- a decision about application of a tax law, auditing of an income tax return, determining facts and applying law to those facts, and prioritizing such returns

== Effects ==
If a ministerial act is not performed, then a court may issue a writ of mandamus to compel the public official to perform said act.

Absolute or sovereign immunity does not apply to the performance or non-performance of ministerial acts.

== See also ==
- Bureaucracy
- Common law
- Equity (law)
- Writs
