= List of United States federal courthouses in Georgia =

Following is a list of current and former courthouses of the United States federal court system located in Georgia. Each entry indicates the name of the building along with an image, if available, its location, and the dates during which it was used for each such jurisdiction, and, if applicable the person for whom it was named, and the date of renaming. In the late 1800s to the middle 1900s, it was common for federal courthouses to double as United States Post Offices.

== Lists of courthouses ==
Courthouse	City	Image	Street address	Jurisdiction	Dates of use	Named for
C. B. King U.S. Courthouse	Albany		201 West Broad Avenue	M.D. Ga.	?-present	Pioneering African American lawyer C. B. King
U.S. Post Office and Courthouse^{†}	Athens		?	S.D. Ga. M.D. Ga.	1906-1926; 1926-1942	n/a
U.S. Post Office and Courthouse	Athens		115 Hancock Avenue	M.D. Ga.	1942-present	n/a
Elbert P. Tuttle U.S. Court of Appeals Bldg^{††}	Atlanta		56 Forsyth Street NW	11th Cir.	?-present	Court of Appeals judge Elbert Tuttle (1989)
Richard B. Russell Federal Building	Atlanta		75 Spring Street SW	N.D. Ga.	?-present	Governor and U.S. Senator Richard Russell Jr.
U.S. Post Office and Courthouse	Augusta		500 Ford Street	S.D. Ga.	?-present	n/a
Frank M. Scarlett Federal Building	Brunswick		805 Gloucester Street	S.D. Ga.	?-present	District Court judge Francis Muir Scarlett
U.S. Post Office and Courthouse^{†}	Columbus		120 12th Street	M.D. Ga.	1933-present	n/a
J. Roy Rowland Federal Courthouse	Dublin		100 North Franklin Street	S.D. Ga.	1935-present	U.S. Rep. J. Roy Rowland
United States Courthouse & Federal Building	Gainesville		121 Spring Street SE Room 201	N.D. Ga.	?-present	n/a
William Augustus Bootle Federal Building & U.S. Courthouse	Macon		475 Mulberry Street	M.D. Ga.	?-present	District Court judge William Augustus Bootle (1998)
Lewis R. Morgan Federal Building & U.S. Courthouse	Newnan		18 Greenville Street	N.D. Ga.	?-present	Court of Appeals judge Lewis Render Morgan
United States Courthouse	Rome		600 East First Street	N.D. Ga.	?-present	n/a
Tomochichi Federal Building & U.S. Courthouse^{†}	Savannah		125 Bull Street	S.D. Ga.	1899-present	Creek leader Tomochichi (2005)
Prince H. Preston Federal Building	Statesboro		52 Main Street	S.D. Ga.	?-present	U.S. Rep. Prince Hulon Preston Jr.
U.S. Courthouse & Post Office	Thomasville		404 North Broad Street	M.D. Ga.	1962-present	n/a
U.S. Post Office and Courthouse	Valdosta		401 N. Patterson Street	M.D. Ga.	?-present	n/a
U.S. Courthouse	Waycross		601 Tebeau Street	S.D. Ga.	1926-1975; Built in 1913; currently vacant.	n/a

== Key ==
^{†}	Listed on the National Register of Historic Places (NRHP)
^{††}	NRHP-listed and also designated as a National Historic Landmark

== See also ==
- List of county courthouses in Georgia (U.S. state)
