= Mohammad Fadel =

American Muslim scholar

Mohammad Fadel is a full professor and former Canada Research Chair for the law and economics of Islamic Law at the University of Toronto Faculty of Law.

== Biography ==
Mohammad Fadel completed his undergraduate studies at the University of Virginia in 1988. He then pursued a Ph.D. at the University of Chicago, earning his degree in 1995. Afterward, he returned to the University of Virginia, where he obtained a J.D. in 1999. In 2000, Professor Fadel was admitted to the Bar of New York and subsequently worked at Sullivan & Cromwell LLP in New York. His work there included corporate finance transactions and regulatory investigations related to securities. During this time, he also served as a law clerk for two federal judges: the Honorable Paul V. Niemeyer of the United States Court of Appeals for the Fourth Circuit and the Honorable Anthony A. Alaimo of the United States District Court for the Southern District of Georgia.
