= Stan Baker =

Stanley or Stan Baker may refer to:

- R. Stan Baker (born 1977), American judge
- Stan Baker (True Blood), fictional character
- Sir Stanley Baker (1928–1976), Welsh actor and producer
