= Jeremiah La Touche Cuyler =

American judge

Judge of the United States District Court for the District of Georgia
- In office June 12, 1821 – May 7, 1839
- Appointed by: James Monroe
- Preceded by: William Davies
- Succeeded by: John Cochran Nicoll

Personal details
- Born: Jeremiah La Touche Cuyler; June 4, 1768 New York City, Province of New York, British America
- Died: May 7, 1839 (aged 70) Savannah, Georgia
- Resting place: Laurel Grove Cemetery
- Spouse: Margaret Elizabeth Clarendon (m. 1793; died 1835)

Jeremiah La Touche Cuyler (June 4, 1768 – May 7, 1839) was a United States district judge of the United States District Court for the District of Georgia.

== Early life ==
Cuyler was born on June 4, 1768, in New York City, Province of New York, British America. He was the sixth child of Jeanne (née Latouche) Cuyler and Telamon Cuyler (1732–1772), a prominent merchant and trader. When he was just five months old, his family moved to Savannah, Georgia, where his father died of dropsy in September 1772. When his mother, a friend of the Marquis de Lafayette, returned to New York (where she died in 1799), he remained in Savannah.

His paternal grandparents were prominent merchant Henry Cuyler (son of Hendrick Cuyler) and Maria (née Jacobs) Cuyler (daughter of Hendrick Jacobson). His maternal grandparents were Jeanne (née Soumain) Latouche (a daughter of goldsmith Simeon Soumaine) and Jérémie Latouche, who was born in Bristol, England and moved to New York with his parents.

== Career ==
Cuyler read law in 1789, studying under John Stirk. He entered private practice in Savannah from 1789 to 1821. He was a member of the Georgia State Senate.

He was elected Receiver of Tax Returns in 1795 from Effingham County, Georgia. On October 5, 1807, he was elected to the Georgia State Senate from Chatham County, Georgia, and served as an alderman of Savannah from 1808 to 1809.

=== Federal judicial service ===
Cuyler received a recess appointment from President James Monroe on June 12, 1821, to a seat on the United States District Court for the District of Georgia vacated by Judge William Davies. He was nominated to the same position by President Monroe on December 19, 1821. He was confirmed by the United States Senate on January 10, 1822, and received his commission the same day. His service ended upon his death in 1839.

== Personal life ==
On April 21, 1793, Cuyler was married to Margaret Elizabeth Clarendon (1777–1835), the only child and heiress of Smith Clarendon and Margherita Meck Clarendon. Her father was a wealthy Englishman who built the first brick house in Savannah and her mother was the widow of John Meck of Germany. Together, they were the parents of eleven children, including:

- William Henry Cuyler (1794–1869), a physician and Judge who never married.
- Richard Randolph Cuyler (1796–1865), an attorney and president of the Central Rail Road and Banking Company of Georgia; he married Mississippi Cuyler, sister of William Washington Gordon.
- Jane M Cuyler (1799–1863), who died unmarried.
- Maria Ann Cuyler (1801–1814), who died young.
- Eliza Sarah Cuyler (1803–1830), who died unmarried.
- Margaret D. Cuyler (1810–1830), who died unmarried.
- John Meck Cuyler (1810–1884), who married Mary Campbell Wayne, a daughter of Supreme Court Justice James Moore Wayne.
- Caroline S. Cuyler (b. 1812), who died unmarried.
- Ann Duer Cuyler (1814–1853), who died unmarried.
- Maria H. Cuyler (1817–1845), who married Ebenezer V. Sibley in 1843.
- Telamon A Cuyler (1818–1853), who married Ann Frances Hamilton, a daughter of Dr. Thomas Hamilton, in 1841.

His wife died of dropsy in August 1835. Cuyler died in Savannah, Georgia, on May 7, 1839, and was buried at Laurel Grove Cemetery.

== Sources ==
Legal offices
Preceded by William Davies	Judge of the United States District Court for the District of Georgia; 1821–1839	Succeeded by John Cochran Nicoll
