= Lisa Godbey Wood =

American judge (born 1963)

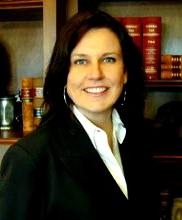

Judge of the United States Foreign Intelligence Surveillance Court of Review
- Incumbent
- Assumed office November 1, 2023
- Appointed by: John Roberts
- Preceded by: Robert Lowell Miller Jr.

Chief Judge of the United States District Court for the Southern District of Georgia
- In office May 5, 2010 – May 5, 2017
- Preceded by: William Theodore Moore Jr.
- Succeeded by: James Randal Hall

Judge of the United States District Court for the Southern District of Georgia
- Incumbent
- Assumed office February 8, 2007
- Appointed by: George W. Bush
- Preceded by: Dudley Hollingsworth Bowen Jr.

United States Attorney for the Southern District of Georgia
- In office July 2004 – February 2007
- President: George W. Bush
- Preceded by: Richard S. Thompson
- Succeeded by: Edmund A. Booth, Jr.

Personal details
- Born: Lisa Sue Godbey; 1963 (age 62–63) Lexington, Kentucky
- Party: Republican
- Spouse: Richard V. Wood
- Education: University of Georgia (BA, JD)

Lisa Godbey Wood (born 1963) is an American lawyer who has served as a United States district judge of the United States District Court for the Southern District of Georgia since 2007, serving as chief judge from 2010 to 2017. In November 2023, she was designated by Chief Justice John Roberts to serve as a judge of the United States Foreign Intelligence Surveillance Court of Review.

== Education and career ==
Born in Lexington, Kentucky, Wood received a Bachelor of Arts degree from the University of Georgia in 1985 and a Juris Doctor from the University of Georgia School of Law in 1990.

From 1985 to 1986 she was the press secretary and later campaign advisor for Georgia Congressman Pat Swindall. From 1986 to 1987 she was a consultant to the Educational Improvement Project. In 1987 she was a career trainee for the Central Intelligence Agency. From 1988 to 1989 she was a summer law clerk for three different law firms. In 1989 she was a teaching assistant at the University of Georgia Business School.

She was a law clerk for Judge Anthony Alaimo of the United States District Court for the Southern District of Georgia in 1990. She was in private practice in Brunswick, Georgia from 1991 to 2004. She was a magistrate judge (part-time), Glynn County Magistrate Court, Georgia from 1998 to 2000. She was the United States Attorney for the Southern District of Georgia from 2004 to 2007.

=== Federal judicial service ===
On January 7, 2007, President George W. Bush nominated Wood to serve as a United States district judge of the United States District Court for the Southern District of Georgia, to a seat vacated by Dudley Hollingsworth Bowen Jr. She was confirmed by the United States Senate on January 30, 2007, and received her commission on February 8, 2007. She served as chief judge from 2010 to 2017. When Wood assumed that role, she became the first woman ever to serve as chief judge for the Southern District of Georgia. On November 1, 2023, she was designated by Chief Justice John Roberts to serve as a judge of the United States Foreign Intelligence Surveillance Court of Review.

Legal offices
| Preceded by Dudley Hollingsworth Bowen Jr. | Judge of the United States District Court for the Southern District of Georgia; 2007–present | Incumbent |
| Preceded by William Theodore Moore Jr. | Chief Judge of the United States District Court for the Southern District of Georgia; 2010–2017 | Succeeded by James Randal Hall |
| Preceded by Robert Lowell Miller Jr. | Judge of the United States Foreign Intelligence Surveillance Court of Review; 2023–present | Incumbent |
