= Francis Scarlett =

Francis Scarlett may refer to:

- Francis Scarlett (RAF officer) (1875–1934), British Air Vice Marshal
- Francis Muir Scarlett (1891–1971), U.S. federal judge
