= Dudley Hollingsworth Bowen Jr. =

American judge (born 1941)

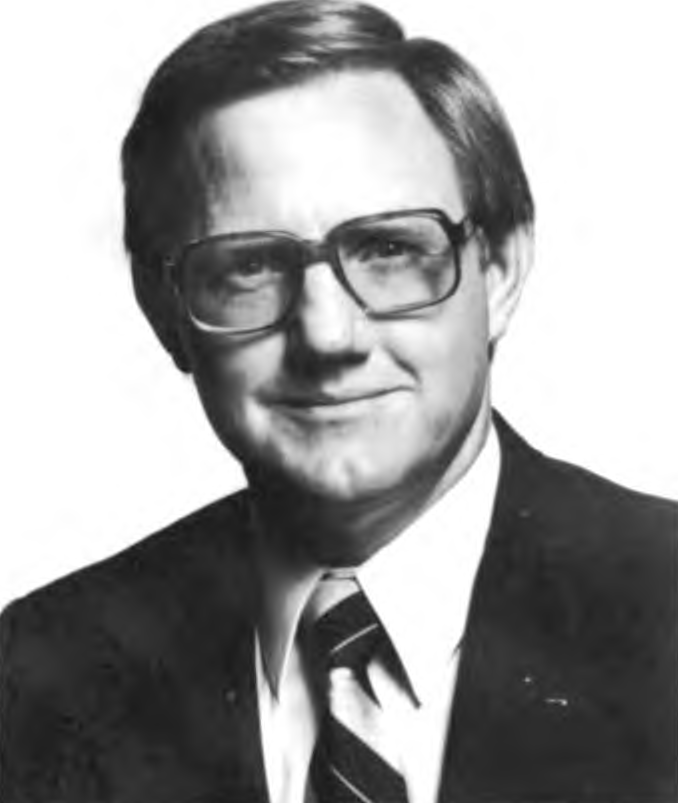

Senior Judge of the United States District Court for the Southern District of Georgia
- Incumbent
- Assumed office June 25, 2006

Chief Judge of the United States District Court for the Southern District of Georgia
- In office 1997–2004
- Preceded by: Berry Avant Edenfield
- Succeeded by: William Theodore Moore Jr.

Judge of the United States District Court for the Southern District of Georgia
- In office November 27, 1979 – June 25, 2006
- Appointed by: Jimmy Carter
- Preceded by: Seat established by 92 Stat. 1629
- Succeeded by: Lisa Godbey Wood

Bankruptcy Judge of the United States District Court for the Southern District of Georgia
- In office 1973–1975

Personal details
- Born: Dudley Hollingsworth Bowen Jr. June 25, 1941 (age 84) Augusta, Georgia, U.S.
- Spouse: Elsie M. Martin
- Education: University of Georgia (AB, LLB)

Military service
- Allegiance: United States
- Branch/service: United States Army
- Years of service: 1966–1968
- Rank: First Lieutenant
- Unit: Fort Gordon, Georgia

Dudley Hollingsworth Bowen Jr. (born June 25, 1941) is a senior United States district judge of the United States District Court for the Southern District of Georgia.

== Education and career ==
Bowen was born in Augusta, Georgia, the son of the owner of a local hardware business. In 1959 he graduated from the Academy of Richmond County. Thereafter he then attended the Washington and Lee University in Lexington, Virginia in 1959, and transferred to the University of Georgia where he received an Artium Baccalaureus degree in 1963. He received a Bachelor of Laws from the University of Georgia School of Law in 1965. He was in private practice of law in Augusta from 1965 to 1966. He was in the United States Army as a lieutenant in the infantry from 1966 to 1968. He was in private practice of law in Augusta from 1968 to 1972. He was a Referee in Bankruptcy for the Southern District of Georgia from 1972 to 1973. He was a United States bankruptcy judge for the Southern District of Georgia from 1973 to 1975. He was in private practice of law in Augusta from 1975 to 1979.

=== Federal judicial service ===
Bowen was nominated by President Jimmy Carter on July 19, 1979, to the United States District Court for the Southern District of Georgia, to a new seat created by 92 stat. 1629. The nomination was criticized by the Southern Regional Council, which complained that Bowen, who had belonged to whites-only organizations and was a fundraiser for Senator Sam Nunn, had been chosen over a well-qualified black attorney; Nunn defended Bowen as qualified. He was confirmed by the United States Senate on November 26, 1979, and received his commission on November 27, 1979. He served as chief judge from 1997 to 2004. He assumed senior status on June 25, 2006.

== Notable cases ==
Among Bowen's cases was litigation over the location of protests of the Masters Tournament, the controversial criminal trial of Charles Walker, the criminal case of spy Otto Attila Gilbert, and the criminal trial of the mayor of Augusta, who was convicted of taking kickbacks.

== See also ==
- List of United States federal judges by longevity of service

Legal offices
Preceded by Seat established by 92 Stat. 1629	Judge of the United States District Court for the Southern District of Georgia; 1979–2006	Succeeded by Lisa Godbey Wood
Preceded by Berry Avant Edenfield	Chief Judge of the United States District Court for the Southern District of Georgia; 1997–2004	Succeeded by William Theodore Moore Jr.
