= Lynching of Phillip Gathers =

Philip Gathers was lynched on June 21, 1920, in Effingham County, Georgia. He allegedly raped and murdered a 17-year old white girl named Anza Jaudon, a crime he was tied to by underwear left at the crime scene. After a week-long search, Gathers was captured by law enforcement and given up to members of the search party. He was then shot, burned, and hanged by a mob of thousands. No one was ever convicted for the lynching.

== Jaudon murder accusations ==
On Friday, June 11, 1920, Anza Jaudon traveled for the weekend from Savannah, Georgia to visit her family in Effingham County. While walking from the train station, Jaudon was raped and murdered approximately 500 yards from her family's home. The following Monday, Jaudon's father telephoned her to find out why she had not arrived and realized she was missing. They began a search and found her body near the road.

An African-American field worker reported seeing Jaudon walking later, followed by a sighting of a man identified as Phillip Gathers who worked as a local wood chopper. Further evidence found at the scene included underwear. Newspapers reported that Gathers' wife described underwear matching that at the scene and that Gathers returned home the evening of the murder without underwear.

== Search for Gathers ==
Thousands of residents of Effingham and its surrounding counties began a search for Gathers. Sightings were reported in Effingham and Savannah. Newspapers indicated that a lynching was expected. The state guard was mobilized and martial law was declared in Effingham County in an effort to protect Gathers if he was captured.

Gathers had started work at a sawmill in Meldrim, applying for the job using his real name. On Wednesday, he left the sawmill and was seen attempting to board a train for Atlanta. He was recognized and shot at, but escaped. A search party chased him with bloodhounds but lost his scent while traveling towards Savannah.

The search expanded into Chatham County on Friday due to sightings and rumors that Gathers was on the outskirts of the city or held in the county jail. On Saturday, he was seen in Brooklet, GA in Bulloch County, asking for food and directions to travel further west. Local search parties were organized to look for him. The search lasted until Monday, when Gathers went to ask for breakfast at the home of "Bud" Stevens, a black man who lived near Stilson, GA. Stevens reported Gathers' presence to a neighbor, a search party was brought to the area and Gathers was captured by the Bulloch County sheriff.

== Lynching ==
Gathers was given up to members of the search party who drove him to the Jaudon family home. Hundreds of cars followed as word of Gathers' capture reached the surrounding areas. When questioned by Jaudon's sister at the family home, Gathers denied the crime but members of the search party claimed he had confessed to the murder after he was captured. Other reports stated that Gathers claimed he drove a white man to the scene of Jaudon's murder and was forced out of the vehicle at gunpoint. He said he did not know he was wanted for the murder until a friend told him.

Gathers was then brought to the site of Jaudon's murder where a mob estimated between one and five thousand had gathered. The mob cut him with knives, chained him to a small tree, doused him in gasoline, and lit him on fire. Gathers broke free of the chains and fell to the ground. The mob opened fire and continued for some time. Four young women pushed into the circle surrounding Gathers and emptied their rifles into his body. One member of the mob was shot with only minor injuries to his ankle.

After the mob stopped firing, some began to cut off parts of Gathers' body as souvenirs, including fingers and toes. His body was then placed back on the fire. After the fire subsided, the mob hung what remained of his body over the road from a low tree limb. An undertaker sent to collect Gathers' body reportedly found only portions of his charred skull.

The State Guard had been called out from Savannah after news of Gathers' capture, but did not arrive until after the mob had begun to disperse.

== Aftermath ==
"Bud" Stevens, the black man who reported Gathers' presence at his home to the search party, was praised in local reporting as a model of "the negroes who are loyal to our best interests and common good and are willing to bring criminals to justice." The Bulloch County Sheriff collected reward money for Stevens from residents throughout the area. The Chicago Defender, a newspaper that campaigned against racial violence, accused Stevens of betraying his race by giving up Gathers to the lynch mob.

A grand jury in October of that year considered charges against members of the lynch mob. Judge A.B. Lovett presided and pleaded with members of the grand jury to indict:

Officers of the law representing the sovereignty of the state, flee from the mob. What a pitiable spectacle. The state, created by the people, in flight, pursued by its own creators. Lawlessness reigns supreme, the security of the law becomes a by-word to be scoffed at, constitutional guarantees are by force made vain and empty things. To justify such conduct some will say that the law is technical and too slow; that justice may miscarry, and punishment be not measurably imposed. Our civil laws are administered by our own people and we but indict ourselves. What assurance have any of you that with public passion sufficiently inflamed you may not be made a victim and your life the forfeit though you be stainless of crime. Let us not make a farce of this court.

No one was ever convicted for the lynching.
