= Judge Nichols =

Judge Nichols may refer to:

- Carl J. Nichols (born 1970), judge of the United States District Court for the District of Columbia
- Philip Nichols Jr. (1907–1990), judge of the United States Court of Appeals for the Federal Circuit

== See also ==
- Fred Joseph Nichol (1912–1996), judge of the United States District Court for the District of South Dakota
- John Cochran Nicoll (1793–1863), judge of the United States District Courts for the District of Georgia and the Northern and Southern Districts of Georgia
