= William Theodore Moore Jr. =

American judge (born 1940)

Senior Judge of the United States District Court for the Southern District of Georgia
- In office February 28, 2017 – March 31, 2024

Chief Judge of the United States District Court for the Southern District of Georgia
- In office 2004–2010
- Preceded by: Dudley Hollingsworth Bowen Jr.
- Succeeded by: Lisa Godbey Wood

Judge of the United States District Court for the Southern District of Georgia
- In office October 11, 1994 – February 28, 2017
- Appointed by: Bill Clinton
- Preceded by: Anthony Alaimo
- Succeeded by: R. Stan Baker

Recorders Court Judge for Garden City, Georgia
- In office 1984–1994

United States Attorney for the Southern District of Georgia
- In office July 5, 1977 – June 15, 1981
- Appointed by: Jimmy Carter
- Preceded by: R. Jackson B. Smith, Jr.
- Succeeded by: Hinton R. Pierce

Personal details
- Born: William Theodore Moore Jr. May 7, 1940 (age 85) Bainbridge, Georgia, U.S.
- Spouse: Jane S. Hodges
- Education: Georgia Military College (AA); University of Georgia (LLB)

William Theodore Moore Jr. (born May 7, 1940) is a former United States district judge of the United States District Court for the Southern District of Georgia.

== Early life, education and career ==
Born in Bainbridge, Georgia, Moore received an Associate of Arts degree from Georgia Military College in 1960 and a Bachelor of Laws from the University of Georgia School of Law in 1964. He was in private practice in Savannah, Georgia from 1964 to 1977. He was the United States Attorney for the Southern District of Georgia from 1977 to 1981. He was in private practice in Savannah from 1981 to 1994. He was a pro-tem recorders court judge, Garden City, Georgia from 1984 to 1994.

=== Federal judicial service ===
On July 13, 1994, Moore was nominated by President Bill Clinton to a seat on the United States District Court for the Southern District of Georgia vacated by Anthony Alaimo. Moore was confirmed by the United States Senate on October 7, 1994, and received his commission on October 11, 1994. He served as chief judge from 2004 to 2010. He assumed senior status on February 28, 2017. Moore retired from active service on March 31, 2024.

== Notable cases ==
In August 2010, Moore ruled on the prominent Troy Davis case. Davis was a Georgia inmate on death row, accused and convicted of murdering a police officer in 1989. Davis's guilt has been questioned, due to the release of new information, including the complete or partial recantation of the testimonies of seven (out of nine total) prosecution witnesses. In his ruling, Moore stated that Davis and his legal team had failed to demonstrate his innocence, as the added information was "largely smoke and mirrors" and added only "minimal doubt"; Moore dismissed four recantations as not credible, and two of them as only partly credible, finding that only one was wholly credible. He did not consider the alleged confessions of Redd Cole, another suspect in the case, because of the failure of Davis's lawyers to subpoena Cole and give him opportunity for rebuttal, and suggested that Davis should appeal directly to the Supreme Court. Davis was executed by lethal injection on September 21, 2011.

== Sources ==
Legal offices
Preceded by Anthony Alaimo	Judge of the United States District Court for the Southern District of Georgia; 1994–2017	Succeeded by R. Stan Baker
Preceded by Dudley Hollingsworth Bowen Jr.	Chief Judge of the United States District Court for the Southern District of Georgia; 2004–2010	Succeeded by Lisa Godbey Wood
