= Hiram Parks Bell =

American politician (1827–1907)

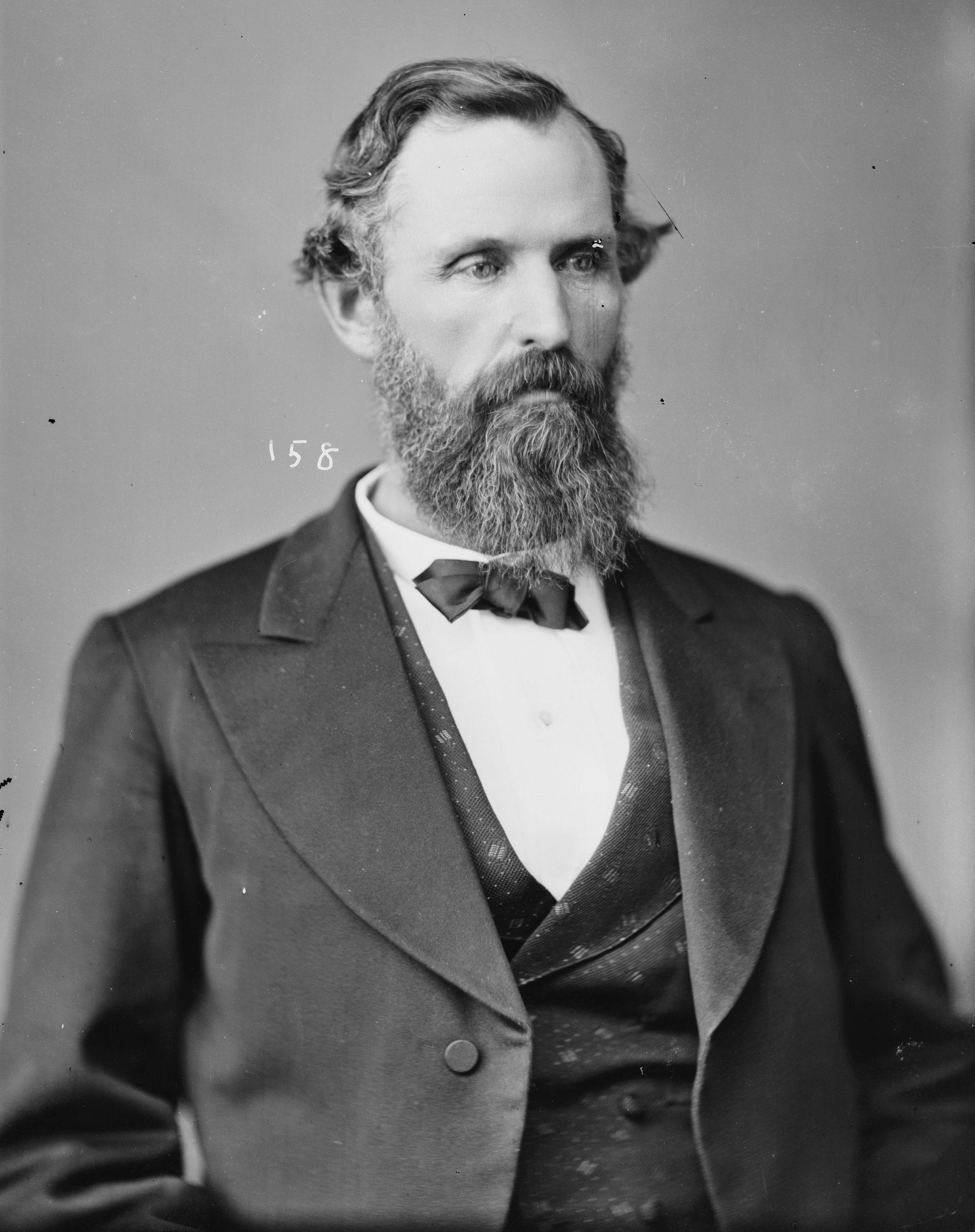

Member of the U.S. House of Representatives from Georgia's 9th congressional district
- In office March 4, 1873 – March 3, 1875
- Preceded by: District established
- Succeeded by: Benjamin H. Hill
- In office March 13, 1877 – March 3, 1879
- Preceded by: Benjamin H. Hill
- Succeeded by: Emory Speer

Member of the Georgia Senate
- In office 1861; 1900–1901

Member of the Georgia House of Representatives
- In office 1898–1899

Personal details
- Born: January 19, 1827 Jefferson, Georgia
- Died: August 16, 1907 (aged 78) Atlanta, Georgia
- Party: Democratic
- Profession: lawyer

Military service
- Allegiance: Confederate States of America
- Branch/service: Confederate States Army
- Years of service: 1861–1864
- Rank: Colonel (CSA)
- Commands: 43rd Georgia Infantry Regiment
- Battles/wars: American Civil War

Hiram Parks Bell (January 19, 1827 – August 16, 1907) was a white supremacist, slave owner, U.S. representative and a Confederate representative from the state of Georgia.

== Early life and education ==
Bell was born January 19, 1827, near Jefferson, Georgia. He taught school for two years, studied law, was admitted to the Georgia bar later in 1849 and became a practicing lawyer in Cumming, Georgia. According to his autobiographical memoirs, "Men and Things," he owned at least two slaves.

== Secession and war ==
Bell was a member of the Georgia secession convention, voting against secession as imprudent, but then signing the Ordinance of Secession. He believed that "the Northern States were astonished that the Southern States would secede; the Southern people were surprised that the government would attempt to hold the States together by force." Hearing that Georgia must "grasp in fraternity the bloody hand of Massachusetts, or align yourselves with gallant South Carolina" shook his views on the need to secede. He served as a Georgia commissioner to work with the state of Tennessee in the formation of a southern confederacy.

=== American Civil War ===
In 1861, Bell served in the Georgia Senate; however, he resigned to join the Confederate States Army during the American Civil War as a captain. He was later promoted to lieutenant colonel and then colonel of the 43rd Georgia Infantry Regiment. Bell was a Georgia representative to the Second Confederate Congress in 1864 and 1865.

== Post-war politics ==
After the war, Bell opposed the Civil Rights Act of 1866 as "legislative folly… intended to harass and humiliate the white people.

He was a member of the Democratic State executive committee from 1868 to 1871. Elected as a Democratic Representative to the 43rd United States Congress representing Georgia's 9th congressional district, Bell served from March 4, 1873, until March 3, 1875. He served as a delegate to the 1876 Democratic National Convention and was chosen an at-large member from Georgia to Democratic National Committee.

Bell was elected to the U.S. Congress again to represent the 10th district of Georgia during the 45th Congress to fill the vacant seat resulting from the resignation of Benjamin Harvey Hill and served from March 13, 1877, to March 3, 1879. Bell lost his bid for reelection to that in 1878. He then served in the Georgia House of Representatives in 1898 and 1899 and the Georgia Senate in 1900 and 1901.

In his memoirs, Bell praised the Ku Klux Klan as "a saving factor in the preservation of order and the prevention of lawlessness" for opposing Reconstruction. He also described himself as one of the "able and patriotic" white Georgian men who "established a Constitution that secured white over black domination."

== Death ==
Bell died in Atlanta, Georgia, on August 16, 1907, and was buried in the Cumming Cemetery.

== Legacy ==
- Bell Street in Atlanta is possibly named for him.
- In June, 2020, residents of Cumming, Georgia called for the removal of his statue from the town square.

Confederate States House of Representatives
Preceded by	Representative to the Second Confederate Congress from Georgia; November 7, 1864 - March 18, 1865	Succeeded by none
U.S. House of Representatives
Preceded by New seat	Member of the U.S. House of Representatives from Georgia's 9th congressional district March 4, 1873 – March 3, 1875	Succeeded by Benjamin Harvey Hill
Preceded by Benjamin Harvey Hill	Member of the U.S. House of Representatives from Georgia's 9th congressional district March 13, 1877 – March 3, 1879	Succeeded by Emory Speer
