= Berry Avant Edenfield =

American judge

Senior Judge of the United States District Court for the Southern District of Georgia
- In office August 2, 2006 – May 9, 2015

Chief Judge of the United States District Court for the Southern District of Georgia
- In office 1990–1997
- Preceded by: Anthony Alaimo
- Succeeded by: Dudley Hollingsworth Bowen Jr.

Judge of the United States District Court for the Southern District of Georgia
- In office October 11, 1978 – August 2, 2006
- Appointed by: Jimmy Carter
- Preceded by: Alexander Atkinson Lawrence Jr.
- Succeeded by: James Randal Hall

Member of the Georgia State Senate from the 4th District
- In office January 1965 – January 1967
- Preceded by: Clinton Oliver
- Succeeded by: Joe Kennedy

Personal details
- Born: Berry Avant Edenfield; August 2, 1934 Bulloch County, Georgia
- Died: May 9, 2015 (aged 80) Savannah, Georgia
- Party: Democratic
- Education: University of Georgia (BBA); University of Georgia School of Law (LLB)

Berry Avant Edenfield (August 2, 1934 – May 9, 2015) was a United States district judge of the United States District Court for the Southern District of Georgia.

== Early years and education ==
Born in Bulloch County, Georgia, Edenfield received a Bachelor of Business Administration from the University of Georgia in 1956 and a Bachelor of Laws from the University of Georgia School of Law in 1958. He was in the United States Army, Georgia National Guard from 1957 to 1963. He was in private practice in Statesboro, Georgia, from 1958 to 1978.

== Legislative ==
Edenfield was elected to the Georgia State Senate, from Bulloch County, representing the 4th District in 1964. He took office in January 1965, serving with South Georgia State Senator, Jimmy Carter. Edenfield served one term, until January 1967.

== Federal judicial service ==
On September 27, 1978, Edenfield was nominated by President Jimmy Carter to a seat on the United States District Court for the Southern District of Georgia vacated by Judge Alexander Atkinson Lawrence Jr. Edenfield was confirmed by the United States Senate on October 10, 1978, and received his commission on October 11, 1978. He served as Chief Judge from 1990 to 1997, and assumed senior status on August 2, 2006, serving in that status until his death.

== Death ==
Edenfield died May 9, 2015, aged 80, at Candler Hospital in Savannah, Georgia, from metastatic lung cancer.

== Sources ==
Legal offices
Preceded by Alexander Atkinson Lawrence Jr.	Judge of the United States District Court for the Southern District of Georgia; 1978–2006	Succeeded by James Randal Hall
Preceded by Anthony Alaimo	Chief Judge of the United States District Court for the Southern District of Georgia; 1990–1997	Succeeded by Dudley Hollingsworth Bowen Jr.
