= Alexander Atkinson Lawrence Jr. =

American judge

Senior Judge of the United States District Court for the Southern District of Georgia
- In office August 2, 1978 – August 20, 1979

Chief Judge of the United States District Court for the Southern District of Georgia
- In office 1970–1976
- Preceded by: Office established
- Succeeded by: Anthony Alaimo

Judge of the United States District Court for the Southern District of Georgia
- In office July 25, 1968 – August 2, 1978
- Appointed by: Lyndon B. Johnson
- Preceded by: Francis Muir Scarlett
- Succeeded by: Berry Avant Edenfield

Personal details
- Born: Alexander Atkinson Lawrence Jr. December 28, 1906 Savannah, Georgia
- Died: August 20, 1979 (aged 72) Savannah, Georgia
- Education: University of Georgia (A.B.) read law

Alexander Atkinson Lawrence Jr. (December 28, 1906 – August 20, 1979) was a United States district judge of the United States District Court for the Southern District of Georgia.

== Education and career ==
Born in Savannah, Georgia, Lawrence received an Artium Baccalaureus degree from the University of Georgia in 1929 and read law to enter the bar in 1930. He was in private practice in Savannah from 1931 to 1968.

== Federal judicial service ==
On July 17, 1968, Lawrence was nominated by President Lyndon B. Johnson to a seat on the United States District Court for the Southern District of Georgia vacated by Judge Francis Muir Scarlett. Lawrence was confirmed by the United States Senate on July 25, 1968, and received his commission the same day. He served as Chief Judge from 1970 to 1976, assuming senior status on August 2, 1978, and serving in that capacity until his death on August 20, 1979, in Savannah.

== Sources ==
Legal offices
Preceded by Francis Muir Scarlett	Judge of the United States District Court for the Southern District of Georgia; 1968–1978	Succeeded by Berry Avant Edenfield
Preceded by Office established	Chief Judge of the United States District Court for the Southern District of Georgia; 1970–1976	Succeeded by Anthony Alaimo
