= Emory Speer =

American judge (1848–1918)

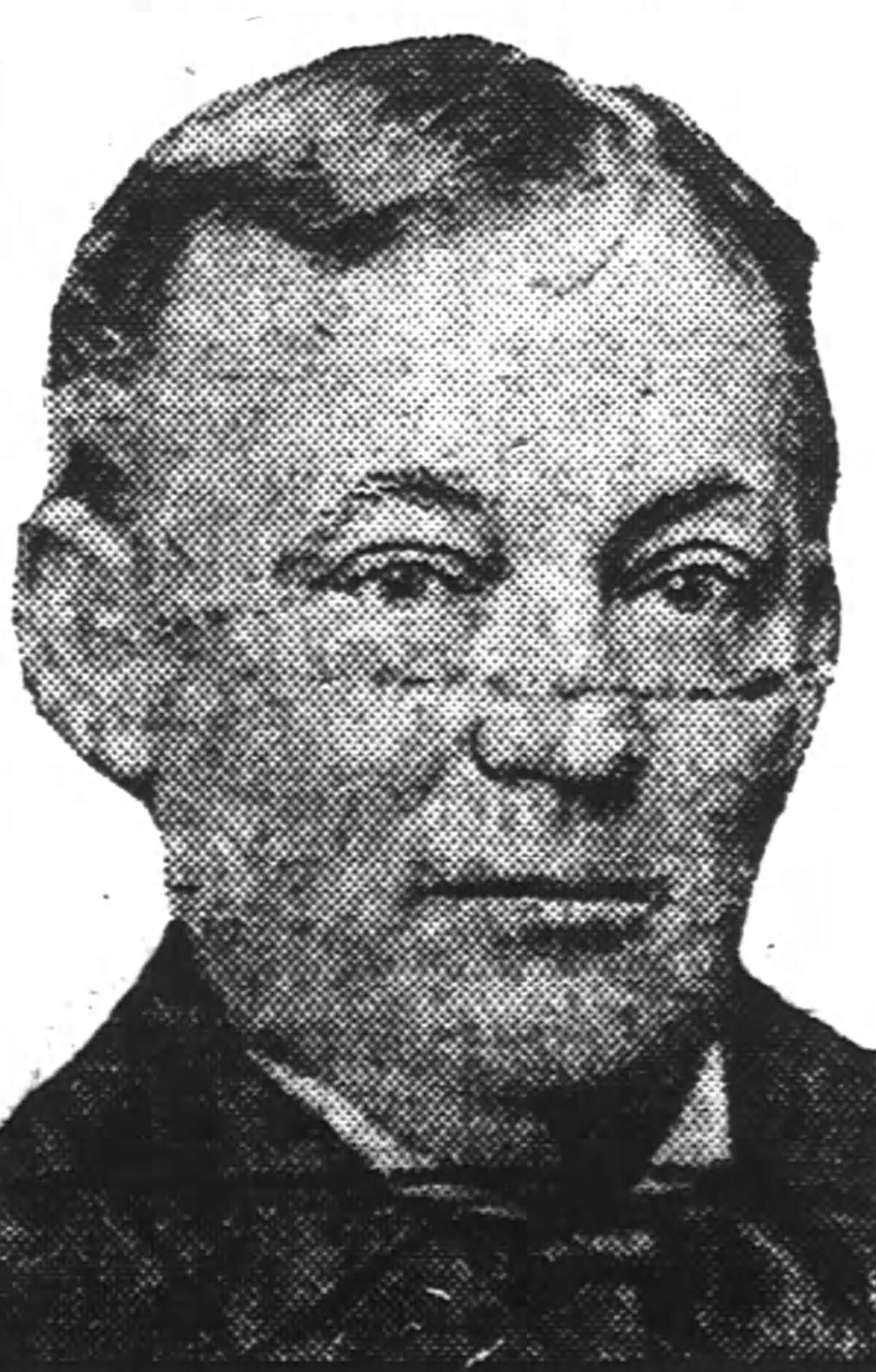

Judge of the United States District Court for the Southern District of Georgia
- In office February 18, 1885 – December 13, 1918
- Appointed by: Chester A. Arthur
- Preceded by: John Erskine
- Succeeded by: Seat abolished

Member of the U.S. House of Representatives from Georgia's 9th district
- In office March 4, 1879 – March 3, 1883
- Preceded by: Hiram Parks Bell
- Succeeded by: Allen D. Candler

Personal details
- Born: Emory Speer; September 3, 1848 Culloden, Georgia, US
- Died: December 13, 1918 (aged 70) Macon, Georgia, US
- Resting place: Riverside Cemetery (Macon, Georgia)
- Party: Independent Democrat
- Education: University of Georgia (A.B.) read law

Emory Speer (September 3, 1848 – December 13, 1918) was a United States representative from Georgia and a United States district judge of the United States District Court for the Southern District of Georgia.

== Youth, lineage, and family life ==
Speer was born on September 3, 1848, in Culloden, Monroe County, Georgia. His parents were Dr. Eustace Willouby Speer (1826 - 1899) and Annie Eliza King Speer (1827 - 1910). Through his mother, Speer was a distant relative of United States founding father Rufus King. His paternal uncle, Alexander M. Speer (1820 - 1897), was a lawyer and judge who served on the Georgia Supreme Court from 1880 until 1882.

His father, Dr. Eustace, was a minister of a Methodist church. He died on October 29, 1899, at the age of 72 after suffering from a "brief illness". His mother, Annie, died on January 1, 1910, at the age of 82 after suffering from a "long illness". Both his parents were buried at Oconee Hill Cemetery in Athens, Clarke County, Georgia.

Eustace's father was Alexander M. Speer (1790 - 1856), also a Methodist minister, a graduate of Emory University and one of the founders of Wesleyan College. He died in 1856 at the age of 66 after suffering from a stroke in 1854, and his life was reportedly "hanging on by a thread" after that.

Eustace's paternal grandfather, Alexander's father, and Emory Speer's great-grandfather, William Speer (1745/1747 - 1830), was an Irish-born soldier in the revolutionary war who served as an aide to Andrew Pickens. Afterwards, he owned 1400 acres of land in South Carolina, within the Abbeville district, where William built a house, which was the house that Emory Speer's paternal grandfather grew up in. A book was written about him by a Wade Speer titled "William Speer (1747 - 1830), his life, family and descendants".

=== Marriage and children ===
Speer married Sallie Dearing in 1869. They had four children together: Eugenia (1870 - 1935), Anne (1872 - 1940), Sally (1876 - 1959), and Lulie (1877 - 1944). However, Speer would father a child with a different woman, Eleanor Digges Morgan, in 1874. The child, Marion Speer (1874 - 1970) would become a local socialite. Sallie Dearing would pass away in 1879, and Speer would remarry Eleanor Digges Morgan soon after. Eleanor would pass away in 1919 at the age of 61.

== Education and career ==
Speer received an Artium Baccalaureus degree in classical studies in 1869 from the University of Georgia and read law. He entered the Confederate States Army in 1864 at the age of sixteen as a volunteer in the Fifth Kentucky Regiment, Lewis brigade, and remained with that command throughout the American Civil War. He was admitted to the bar and entered private practice in Athens, Georgia from 1869 to 1883. He was Solicitor General for the State of Georgia from 1873 to 1876.

== Congressional service ==
Speer was an unsuccessful candidate for election to the 45th United States Congress to fill the unexpired term of United States Representative Benjamin Harvey Hill. He was elected as an Independent Democrat from Georgia's 9th congressional district to the United States House of Representatives of the 46th and 47th United States Congresses, serving from March 4, 1879, to March 3, 1883. He was an unsuccessful candidate for reelection in 1882.

== Later career ==
Following his departure from Congress, Speer resumed private practice in Atlanta, Georgia from 1883 to 1885. He was the United States Attorney for the Northern District of Georgia from 1883 to 1885.

== Federal judge and law dean ==
Speer was nominated by President Chester A. Arthur on January 19, 1885, to a seat on the United States District Court for the Southern District of Georgia vacated by Judge John Erskine. He was confirmed by the United States Senate on February 18, 1885, and received his commission the same day. His service terminated on December 13, 1918, due to his death in Macon, Georgia. He was the last federal judge in active service to have been appointed by President Arthur.

During his tenure, Judge Speer heard civil rights cases, and became unpopular in the white community for holding that federal law permitted protection of African Americans. In November, 1888, he wrote a letter to President-elect Benjamin Harrison and asked him for the enforcement of African-American rights during his term. During his federal judicial service, Speer also served as dean of Mercer University Law School in Macon from 1893 to 1918.

== Death ==
Speer died at a Macon hospital on December 13, 1918, around 9 PM at the age of 70 after reportedly being ill for three weeks. He was apparently supposed to be moved to a Baltimore hospital for continued treatment, but his condition worsened too much for the trip. He was buried at Riverside Cemetery in Macon, Bibb County, Georgia.

== Publications ==
- Removal of Causes from State to United States Courts, 1888.
- Lectures on the Constitution of the United States before the law class of Mercer University, J.W. Burke Co., 1897.
- Lincoln, Lee, Grant, and other biographical addresses, 1909.

== See also ==
- List of United States federal judges by longevity of service

== Sources ==
- United States Congress. "Emory Speer". Biographical Directory of the United States Congress.
- History of the University of Georgia, Thomas Walter Reed, Imprint: Athens, Georgia : University of Georgia, ca. 1949 pp.878-882
- Rines, George Edwin, ed. (1920). "Speer, Emory" . Encyclopedia Americana.

U.S. House of Representatives
Preceded by Hiram Parks Bell	Member of the U.S. House of Representatives from Georgia's 9th congressional district 1879–1883	Succeeded by Allen D. Candler
Legal offices
Preceded by John Erskine	Judge of the United States District Court for the Southern District of Georgia; 1885–1918	Succeeded by Seat abolished
