= Beverly Daniel Evans Jr. =

American judge

Judge of the United States District Court for the Southern District of Georgia
- In office August 15, 1917 – May 7, 1922
- Appointed by: Woodrow Wilson
- Preceded by: William Wallace Lambdin
- Succeeded by: William H. Barrett

Member of the Georgia House of Representatives
- In office 1886-1887

Personal details
- Born: Beverly Daniel Evans Jr. May 21, 1865 Sandersville, Georgia, U.S.
- Died: May 7, 1922 (aged 56)
- Education: Mercer University (A.B., A.M.)

Beverly Daniel Evans Jr. (May 21, 1865 – May 7, 1922) was a United States district judge of the United States District Court for the Southern District of Georgia and a state legislator.

== Early life ==
Beverly Daniel Evans Jr. was born in Sandersville, Georgia. Evans received an Artium Baccalaureus degree from Mercer University in 1881 and an Artium Magister degree from the same institution in 1882.

== Career ==
Evans was in private practice in Georgia from 1884 to 1894, serving as a member of the Georgia House of Representatives from 1886 to 1887. He was solicitor general of Georgia's Middle Judicial Circuit from 1890 to 1897. He was a judge of the Middle Judicial Circuit of Georgia from 1899 to 1904. He was a justice of the Supreme Court of Georgia from 1904 to 1917.

=== Federal judicial service ===
On August 11, 1917, Evans was nominated by President Woodrow Wilson to a seat on the United States District Court for the Southern District of Georgia vacated by Judge William Wallace Lambdin. Evans was confirmed by the United States Senate on August 15, 1917, and received his commission the same day. Evans served in that capacity until his death.

== Death ==
Evans died on May 7, 1922.

== Sources ==
Legal offices
Preceded by William Wallace Lambdin	Judge of the United States District Court for the Southern District of Georgia; 1917–1922	Succeeded by William H. Barrett
