= Erskine Memorial Fountain =

Fountain in Grant Park

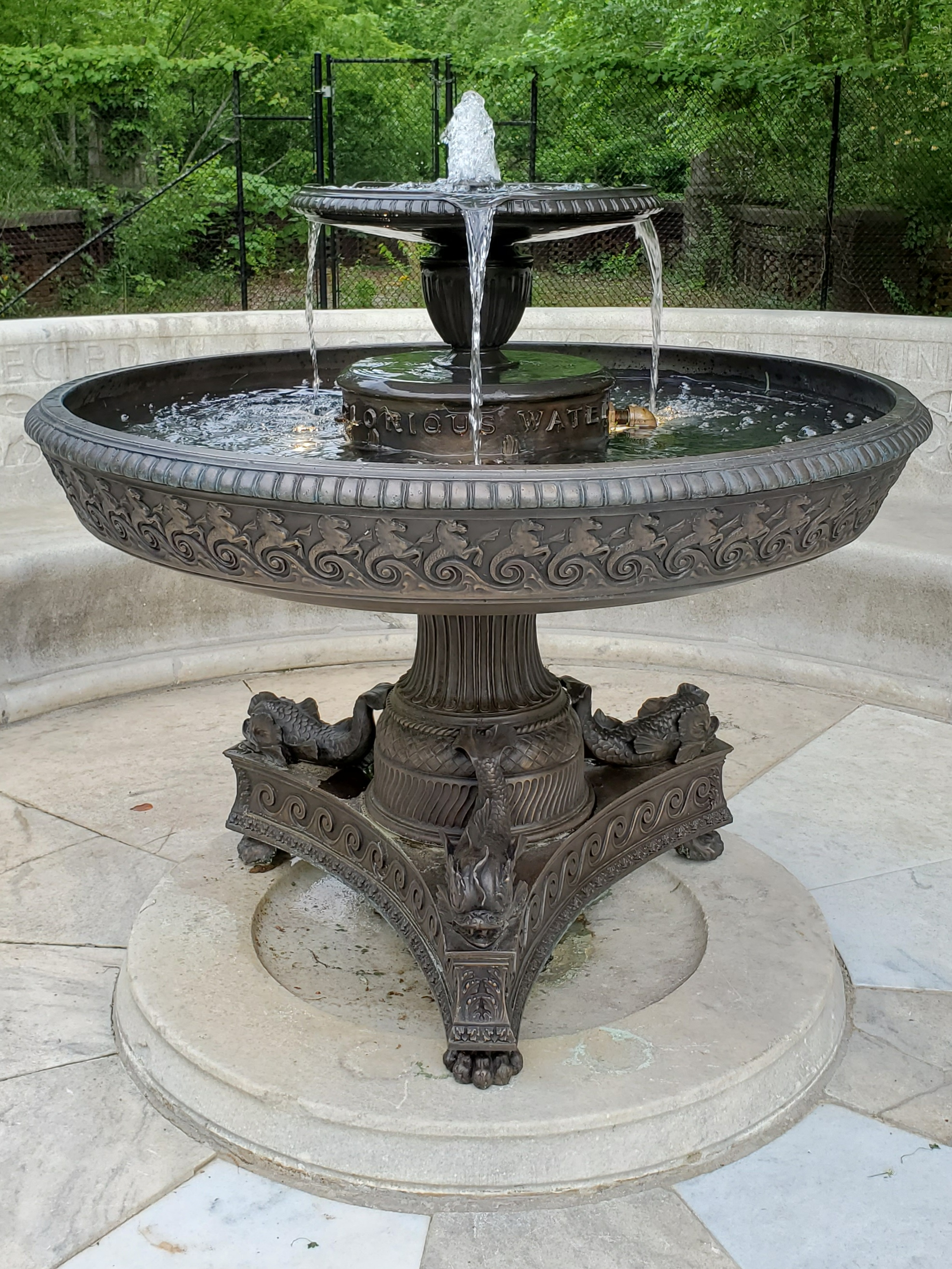
- The fountain in 2021
- Interactive map of Erskine Memorial Fountain
- Location: Grant Park, Atlanta, Georgia, United States
- Coordinates: 33°43′53″N 84°22′24″W
- Designer: J. Massey Rhind
- Type: Fountain
- Material: Bronze
- Dedicated date: May 2, 1896
- Dedicated to: John Erskine

The Erskine Memorial Fountain is a public fountain in Grant Park of Atlanta, Georgia, United States. Designed by J. Massey Rhind in honor of John Erskine, it was the first public fountain in Atlanta. The fountain was built in 1896 and moved to its current location in 1912.

== History ==
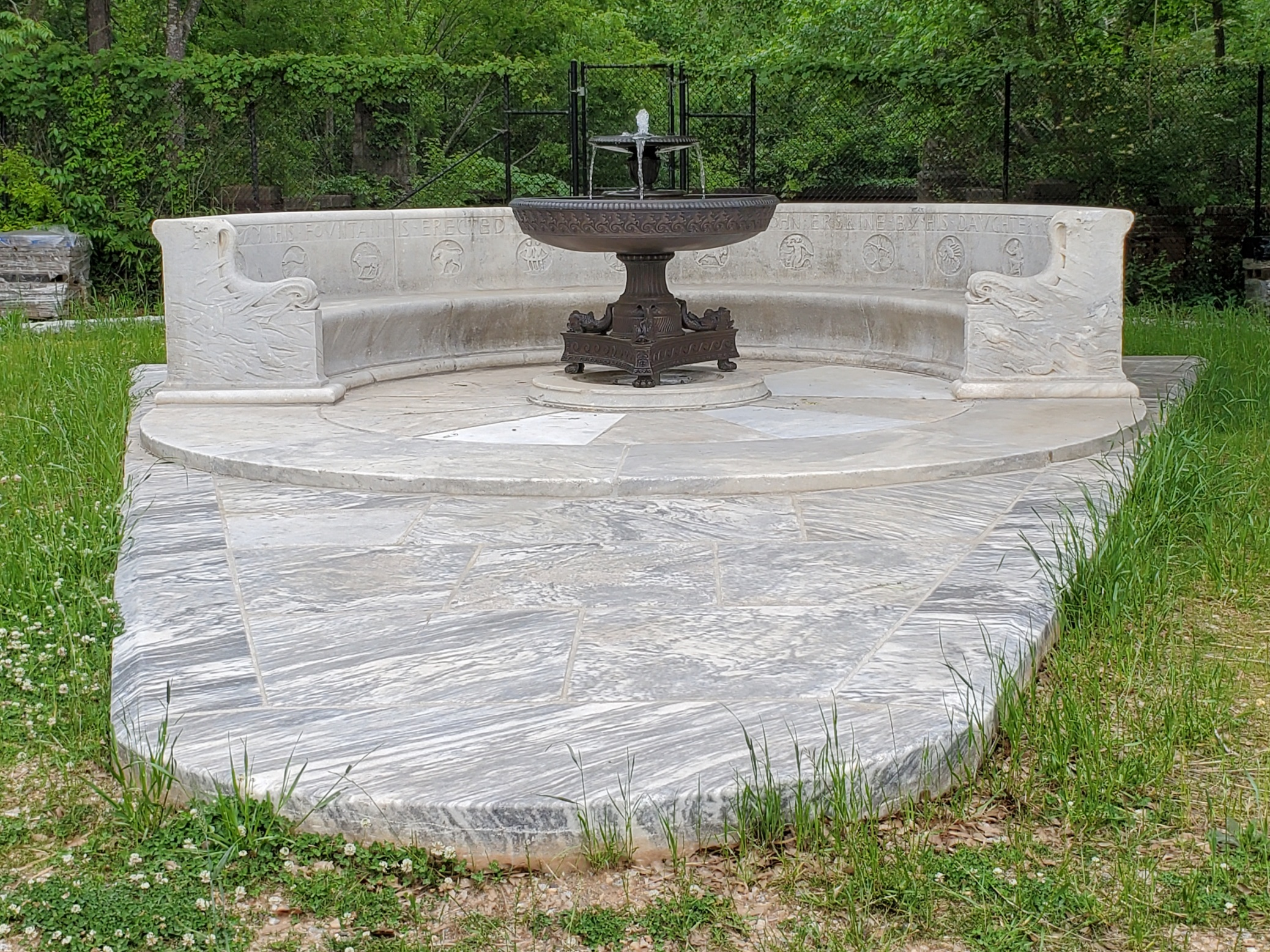
The fountain and surrounding bench

The fountain was built to honor John Erskine, a Federal judge from Atlanta who died in 1895. The fountain, which cost $15,000 to build, was a gift from Erskine's daughter to the city of Atlanta and was dedicated by Mayor Porter King on May 2, 1896. It was the first public fountain in Atlanta. The fountain was originally placed at what is now Hardy Ivy Park, at the diversion of Peachtree Street and West Peachtree Street. The fountain replaced a statue of Benjamin Harvey Hill, which was moved from the location to the Georgia State Capitol, where it still stands. The fountain and accompanying bench were designed by J. Massey Rhind and feature an ocean theme, along with inscriptions of the Zodiac signs. The lower bowl of the fountain originally had bronze cups attached with chains to allow people to drink from it, though these have since been removed.

In 1912, regrading of the nearby streets caused the fountain to be several feet higher than the surrounding sidewalks. While a city official initially recommended the fountain "lowered or removed entirely", public outcry, including from Forrest Adair, resulted in the fountain being moved to another location in the city. While it was initially proposed to be relocated to Piedmont Park, the fountain was ultimately relocated to Grant Park by late 1912, where it overlooked Lake Abana. The area is now home to Zoo Atlanta.

Since its relocation, the fountain has experienced extensive neglect and is today inoperable, having also lost several of its decorative ornaments. Recently, efforts at preservation have included the creation of the Erskine Fountain Fund to restore the fountain. In 2019, a $100,000 grant was awarded to the Grant Park Conservancy to help restore the fountain and other historic monuments in the park.

== Gallery ==
Zodiac signs and inscription on bench

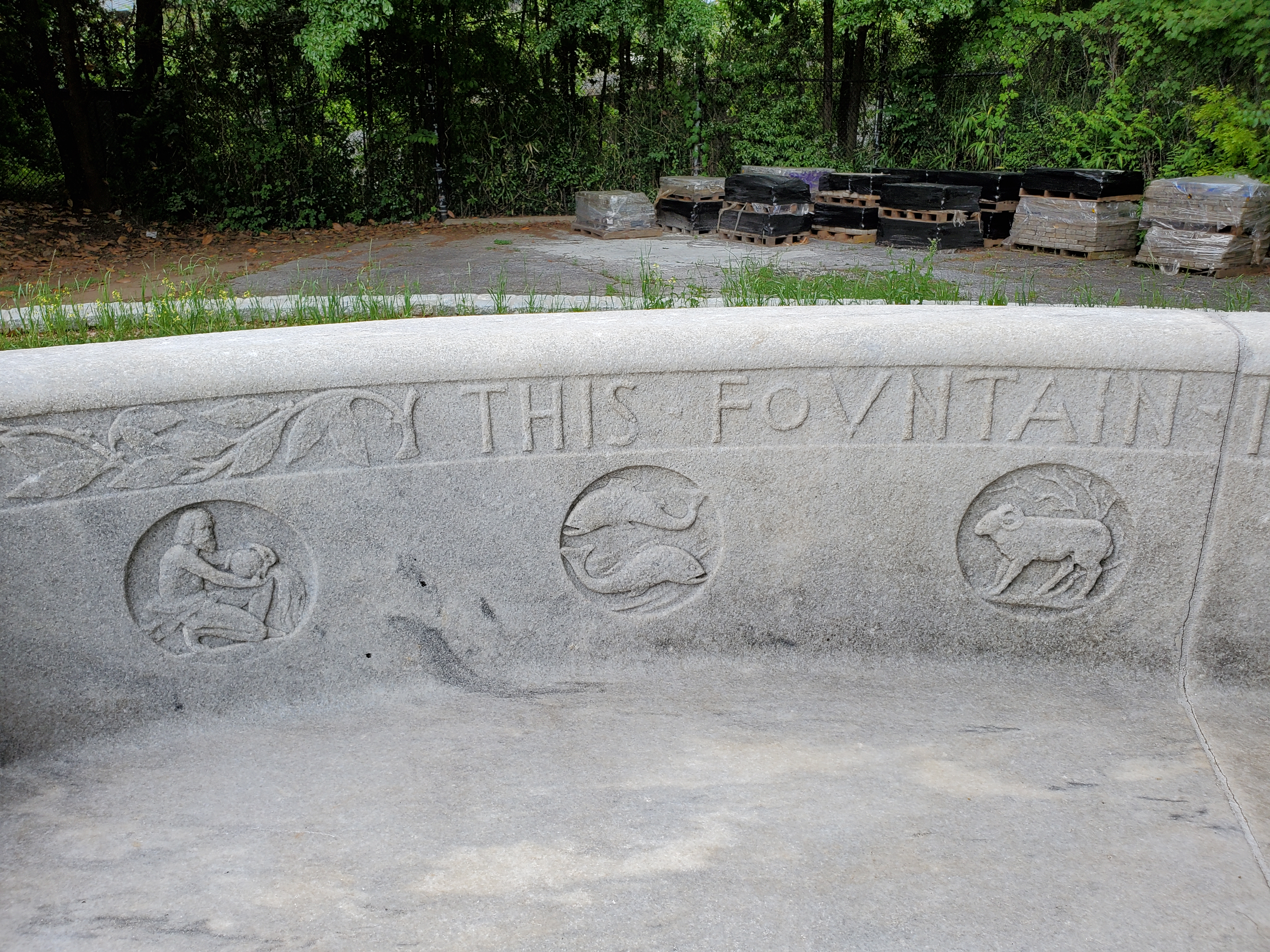

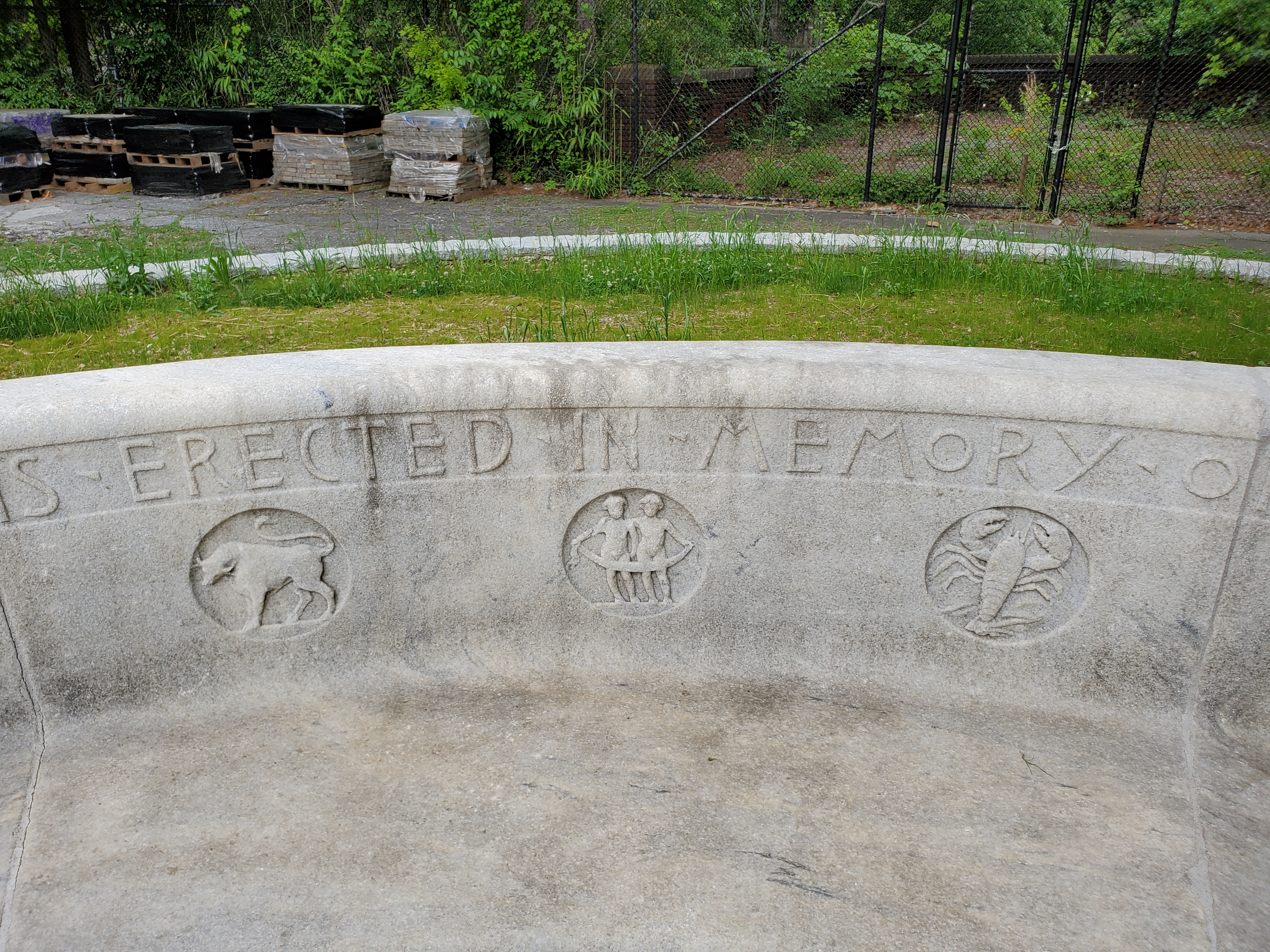

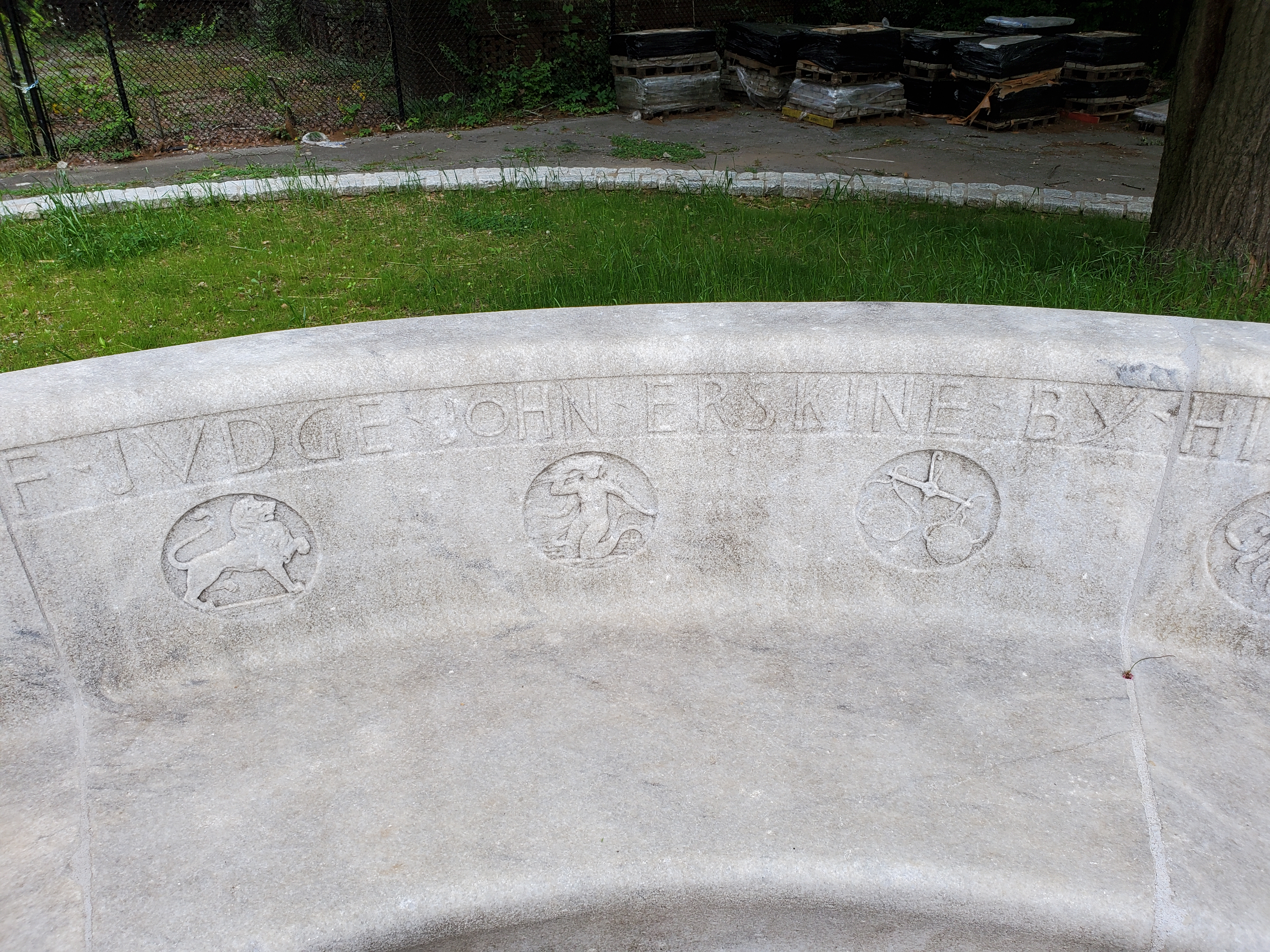

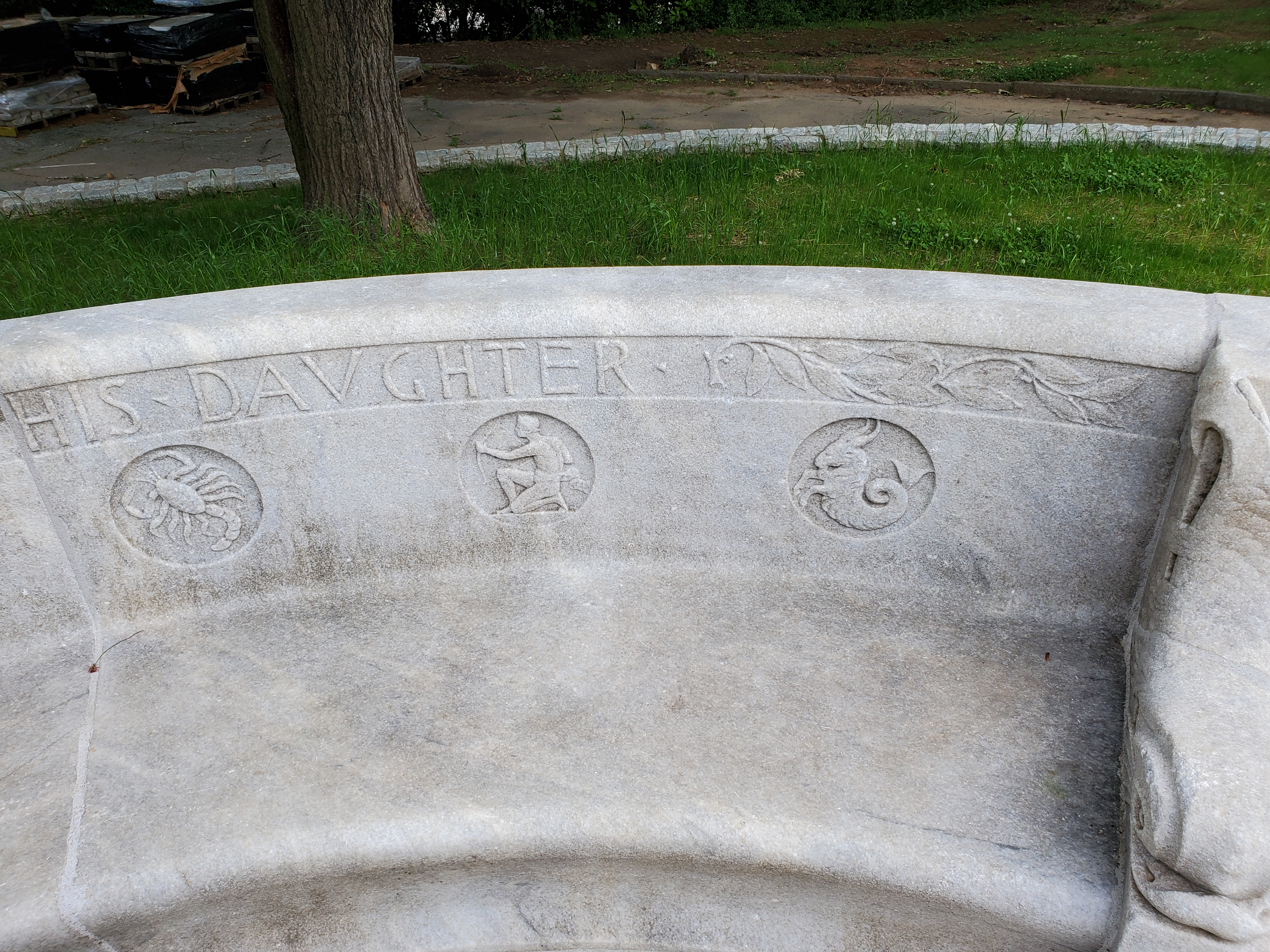

== See also ==
- 1896 in art
- Drinking fountains in the United States
