= John Erskine (judge) =

American judge

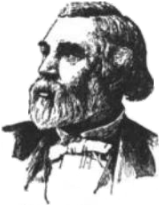

Judge of the United States District Court for the Southern District of Georgia
- In office July 10, 1865 – December 1, 1883
- Appointed by: Andrew Johnson
- Preceded by: John Cochran Nicoll
- Succeeded by: Emory Speer

Judge of the United States District Court for the Northern District of Georgia
- In office July 10, 1865 – April 25, 1882
- Appointed by: Andrew Johnson
- Preceded by: John Cochran Nicoll
- Succeeded by: Seat abolished

Personal details
- Born: John Erskine; September 13, 1813 Strabane, Ireland
- Died: January 27, 1895 (aged 81) Atlanta, Georgia
- Education: read law

John Erskine (September 13, 1813 – January 27, 1895) was a United States district judge of the United States District Court for the Northern District of Georgia and the United States District Court for the Southern District of Georgia.

== Education and career ==
Born on September 13, 1813, in Strabane, County Tyrone, Ireland, Erskine read law in 1846. He entered private practice in Florida from 1846 to 1855. He continued private practice in Newnan, Georgia starting in 1855, and in Atlanta, Georgia until 1865.

== Federal judicial service ==
Erksine received a recess appointment from President Andrew Johnson on July 10, 1865, to a joint seat on the United States District Court for the Northern District of Georgia and the United States District Court for the Southern District of Georgia vacated by Judge John Cochran Nicoll. He was nominated to the same position by President Johnson on December 20, 1865. He was confirmed by the United States Senate on January 22, 1866, and received his commission the same day. He was reassigned to serve only in the Southern District on April 25, 1882. His service terminated on December 1, 1883, due to his retirement.

== Death ==
Erskine died on January 27, 1895, in Atlanta. The following year, the Erskine Memorial Fountain, the first public fountain in Atlanta, was dedicated in his honor. The fountain is today located in Grant Park.

== Sources ==
Legal offices
Preceded by John Cochran Nicoll	Judge of the United States District Court for the Northern District of Georgia; 1865–1882	Succeeded by Seat abolished
Preceded by John Cochran Nicoll	Judge of the United States District Court for the Southern District of Georgia; 1865–1883	Succeeded by Emory Speer
