= William H. Barrett =

American judge

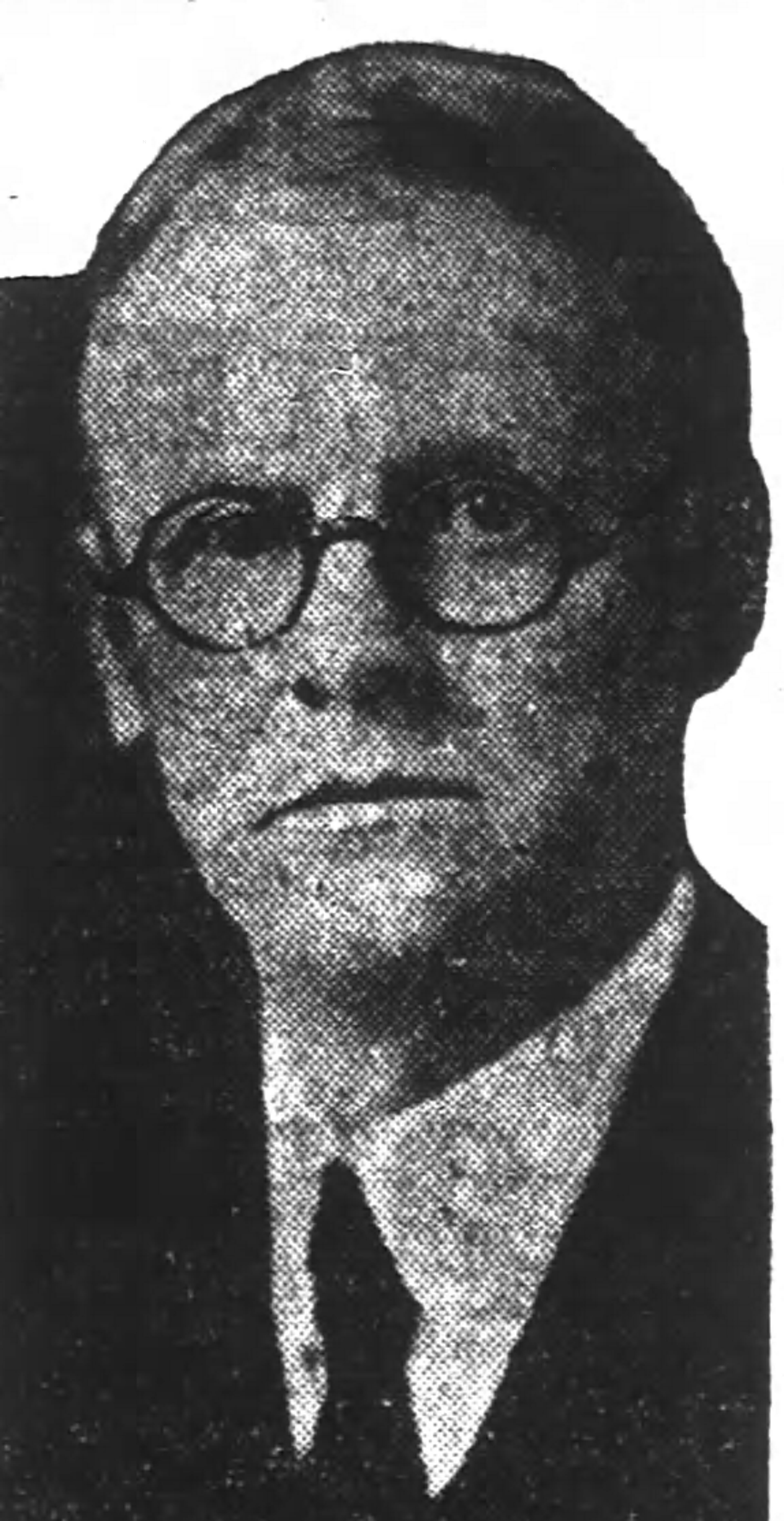

Judge of the United States District Court for the Southern District of Georgia
- In office June 22, 1922 – May 1, 1941
- Appointed by: Warren G. Harding
- Preceded by: Beverly Daniel Evans Jr.
- Succeeded by: Archibald Battle Lovett

Personal details
- Born: William Hale Barrett; September 10, 1866
- Died: May 1, 1941 (aged 74)
- Education: University of Georgia (Ph.B.) read law

William Hale Barrett (September 10, 1866 – May 1, 1941), frequently known as W. H. Barrett, was a United States district judge of the United States District Court for the Southern District of Georgia.

== Education and career ==
Barrett received a Bachelor of Philosophy degree from the University of Georgia in 1885 and read law to enter the bar in 1887. He was the Principal of the Central Grammar School of Augusta, Georgia from 1885 to 1887, entering private practice in Georgia from 1887 to 1922. He was recorder for the Augusta Police Court from 1894 to 1898, and was city attorney of Augusta from 1898 to 1904. In 1916, he along with James Meriwether Hull formed the law firm known today as Hull Barrett, P.C.

== Federal judicial service ==
On June 14, 1922, Barrett was nominated by President Warren G. Harding to a seat on the United States District Court for the Southern District of Georgia vacated by Judge Beverly Daniel Evans Jr. Barrett was confirmed by the United States Senate on June 22, 1922, and received his commission the same day, serving thereafter until his death on May 1, 1941.

== Sources ==
- "Georgia Legal Services - Foreclosure Litigation Attorney".

Legal offices
| Preceded by Beverly Daniel Evans Jr. | Judge of the United States District Court for the Southern District of Georgia; 1922–1941 | Succeeded by Archibald Battle Lovett |
