= James Randal Hall =

American judge (born 1958)

Chief Judge of the United States District Court for the Southern District of Georgia
- In office May 5, 2017 – May 5, 2024
- Preceded by: Lisa Godbey Wood
- Succeeded by: R. Stan Baker

Judge of the United States District Court for the Southern District of Georgia
- Incumbent
- Assumed office April 29, 2008
- Appointed by: George W. Bush
- Preceded by: Berry Avant Edenfield

Member of the Georgia Senate from the 22nd district
- In office 2003–2004
- Preceded by: Charles Walker
- Succeeded by: Ed Tarver

Personal details
- Born: 1958 (age 67–68) Augusta, Georgia, U.S.
- Party: Republican
- Education: Augusta College (BA); University of Georgia (JD)

James Randal Hall (born 1958), known professionally as J. Randal Hall, is a United States district judge of the United States District Court for the Southern District of Georgia.James Randal Hall (born 1958), known professionally as J. Randal Hall, is a United States district judge of the [[United States District Court for the Southern District of Georgia]].He received a Bachelor of Arts degree from AugustaCollege in 1979 and a Juris Doctor from the University of Georgia School of Law in 1982.He was then vice-president and legal counsel of Bankers First Corporation until 1996, thereafter returning to private practice until 2008.He served in the Georgia State Senate representing the 22nd district from 2003 to 2004.He was an unsuccessful candidate for election to the 23rd district of the Georgia State Senate in 2004.The American Bar Association rated Hall "Substantial Majority Well Qualified, Minority Qualified" for the nomination.

Hearings on Hall's nomination were held before the Senate Judiciary Committee on February 12, 2008, and his nomination was reported by Senator Patrick Leahy on March 6, 2008. Hall was confirmed on a voice vote of the United States Senate on April 10, 2008.Hall was nominated by President George W. Bush on March 19, 2007, to a seat on the United States District Court for the Southern District of Georgia vacated by Berry Avant Edenfield.

== Education and career ==
Hall was born in Augusta, Georgia. He received a Bachelor of Arts degree from Augusta University in 1979 and a Juris Doctor from the University of Georgia School of Law in 1982. During the summers of 1979, 1980, and 1981 he worked for Lightning Galleries Inc in Augusta. He was in private practice in Augusta, from 1982 to 1985, and was then vice-president & legal counsel of Bankers First Corporation until 1996, thereafter returning to private practice until 2008. He is a former director of Patriot Foods, LLC and Hall-Augusta Properties, LLC. He is also a former director of Georgia Carolina Bancshares, Inc. of the First Bank of Georgia.

=== Politics ===
He served in the Georgia State Senate representing the 22nd district from 2003 to 2004. Before that, he was a member of the Augusta-Richmond Planning Commission from 1997 to 2002. In 2006, Governor Sonny Perdue appointed him to the Governor’s Task Force on Redistricting. He was an unsuccessful candidate for election to the 23rd district of the Georgia State Senate in 2004. In 2005 he was appointed to the Georgia Medical Center Authority by Georgia state senator Eric Johnson.

=== Federal judicial service ===
On March 19, 2007, Hall was nominated by President George W. Bush to a seat on the United States District Court for the Southern District of Georgia vacated by Berry Avant Edenfield. Hall was confirmed by the United States Senate on April 10, 2008, and received his commission on April 29, 2008. He served as Chief Judge from May 5, 2017 to May 5, 2024, completing a seven-year term.

== See also ==
- United States District Court for the Southern District of Georgia
- List of federal judges appointed by George W. Bush
- Georgia State Senate
- Berry Avant Edenfield==External links==
- Federal Judicial Center biography
- Ballotpedia profile
- US Courts Judicial Milestones
- Senate Nomination Record

== Sources ==
Legal offices
Preceded by Berry Avant Edenfield	Judge of the United States District Court for the Southern District of Georgia; 2008–present	Incumbent
Preceded by Lisa Godbey Wood	Chief Judge of the United States District Court for the Southern District of Georgia; 2017–2024	Succeeded by R. Stan Baker
