= William Wallace Lambdin =

American judge

Judge of the United States District Court for the Southern District of Georgia
- In office March 3, 1915 – December 20, 1916
- Appointed by: Woodrow Wilson
- Preceded by: Seat established by 38 Stat. 959
- Succeeded by: Beverly Daniel Evans Jr.

Personal details
- Born: William Wallace Lambdin; October 25, 1861 Upson County, Georgia
- Died: December 20, 1916 (aged 55)
- Education: University of Georgia (A.B.) read law

William Wallace Lambdin (October 25, 1861 – December 20, 1916) was a United States district judge of the United States District Court for the Southern District of Georgia.

== Education and career ==
Born in Upson County, Georgia, Lambdin received an Artium Baccalaureus degree from the University of Georgia in 1879 and read law to enter the bar in 1888. He was in private practice in Atlanta, Georgia from 1888 to 1899, then in Barnesville, Georgia until 1906, and then in Waycross, Georgia from 1906 to 1915.

== Federal judicial service ==
On March 3, 1915, Lambdin was nominated by President Woodrow Wilson to a new seat on the United States District Court for the Southern District of Georgia created by 38 Stat. 959. He was confirmed by the United States Senate on March 3, 1915, and received his commission the same day. Lambdin served in that capacity for little over a year and a half, until his death on December 20, 1916.

== Sources ==
Legal offices
Preceded by Seat established by 38 Stat. 959	Judge of the United States District Court for the Southern District of Georgia; 1915–1916	Succeeded by Beverly Daniel Evans Jr.
