= 43rd Georgia Infantry Regiment =

Infantry regiment of the Confederate States Army

- Georgia State flag prior to 1879
- Active: April 1862–April 26, 1865
- Country: Confederate States of America
- Allegiance: Georgia
- Branch: Confederate States Army
- Type: Infantry
- Size: Regiment
- Engagements: American Civil War: Battle of Chickasaw Bayou; Battle of Champion Hill; Siege of Vicksburg; Battle of Nashville; Battle of Franklin; Battle of Bentonville

The 43rd Georgia Infantry Regiment was an Infantry Regiment of the Confederate States Army during the American Civil War.

== History ==
The regiment was first organized during the spring of 1862 with men recruited from Banks, Cherokee, Forsyth, Hall, Jackson, and Pickens counties. They were mustered into Confederate Service at Camp McDonald near Big Shanty, GA, March 10, 1862, to April 10, 1862.

The commanding officers during the war were Skidmore Harris and Hiram Parks Bell. The regiment served in the brigade of Seth M. Barton and Marcellus A. Stovall.

== Companies ==
A Company (Cherokee Van Guards) was formed in Cherokee County, Georgia
B Company was formed in Cherokee County, Georgia
C Company (Pickens Volunteers) was formed in Pickens County, Georgia
D Company (Middle Rivers Volunteers) was formed in Banks County, Georgia
E Company (Kellogg Rifles) was formed in Forsyth County, Georgia
F Company (Hall Light Guards) was formed in Hall County, Georgia
G Company (Rebel Guards) was formed in Jackson County, Georgia
H Company (Jackson County Blues) was formed in Jackson County, Georgia
I Company (Zillicoffer Guards) was formed in Forsyth County, Georgia
K Company (Brown’s Boys) was formed in Hall County, Georgia
L Company was formed in Pickens County, Georgia

== See also ==
- List of Civil War regiments from Georgia
