= United States District Court for the Southern District of Georgia =

United States federal district court in Georgia

Coordinates: 32°4′41″N 81°5′35″W

- (S.D. Ga.)
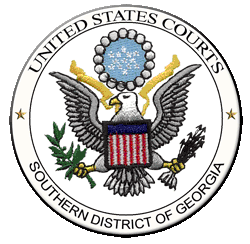
- Location: Tomochichi Federal Building and U.S. Courthouse (Savannah) More locations: Augusta; Frank M. Scarlett Federal Building (Brunswick); Dublin; Waycross; Statesboro
- Appeals to: Eleventh Circuit
- Established: August 11, 1848
- Judges: 3
- Chief Judge: R. Stan Baker

Officers of the court
- U.S. Attorney: Meg E. Heap
- U.S. Marshal: David L. Lyons
- www.gasd.uscourts.gov

The United States District Court for the Southern District of Georgia (in case citations, S.D. Ga.) is a federal court in the Eleventh Circuit (except for patent claims and claims against the U.S. government under the Tucker Act, which are appealed to the Federal Circuit).

As of August 18, 2025 the United States attorney for the District is Meg E. Heap.

== History ==
The United States District Court for the District of Georgia was one of the original thirteen courts established by the Judiciary Act of 1789, 1 Stat. 73, on September 24, 1789. The District was further subdivided into Northern and Southern Districts on August 11, 1848, by 9 Stat. 280. The Middle District was formed from portions of both the Northern and Southern Districts on May 28, 1926, by 44 Stat. 670.

== Jurisdiction ==
The Augusta Division comprises the following counties: Burke, Columbia, Glascock, Jefferson, Lincoln, McDuffie, Richmond, Taliaferro, Warren and Wilkes.

The Brunswick Division comprises the following counties: Appling, Camden, Glynn, Long, McIntosh, Jeff Davis, and Wayne.

The Dublin Division comprises the following counties: Dodge, Johnson, Laurens, Montgomery, Telfair, Treutlen, and Wheeler.

The Savannah Division comprises the following counties: Bryan, Chatham, Effingham, and Liberty.

The Statesboro Division comprises the following counties: Bulloch, Candler, Emanuel, Evans, Jenkins, Screven, Tattnall, and Toombs.

The Waycross Division comprises the following counties: Atkinson, Bacon, Brantley, Charlton, Coffee, Pierce, and Ware.

== Current judges ==
As of May 5, 2024:

#	Title	Judge	Duty station	Born	Term of service			Appointed by
#	Title	Judge	Duty station	Born	Active	Chief	Senior	Appointed by
16	Chief Judge	R. Stan Baker	Savannah	1977	2018–present	2024–present	—	Trump
14	District Judge	Lisa Godbey Wood	Brunswick	1963	2007–present	2010–2017	—	G.W. Bush
15	District Judge	James Randal Hall	Augusta	1958	2008–present	2017–2024	—	G.W. Bush
12	Senior Judge	Dudley Bowen Jr.	Augusta	1941	1979–2006	1997–2004	2006–present	Carter

== Former judges ==
#	Judge	Born–died	Active service	Chief Judge	Senior status	Appointed by	Reason for termination
1	John Cochran Nicoll	1793–1863	1848–1861 (Note: Reassigned from the District of Georgia; jointly appointed to the Northern and Southern Districts of Georgia.)	—	—	Van Buren/Operation of law	resignation
2	John Erskine	1813–1895	1865–1883 (Note: Recess appointment; formally nominated on December 20, 1865, confirmed by the United States Senate on January 22, 1866, and received commission the same day; from 1865–1882, Judge Erskine was jointly appointed to the Northern and Southern Districts of Georgia.)	—	—	A. Johnson	retirement
3	Emory Speer	1848–1918	1885–1918	—	—	Arthur	death
4	William Wallace Lambdin	1861–1916	1915–1916	—	—	Wilson	death
5	Beverly Daniel Evans Jr.	1865–1922	1917–1922	—	—	Wilson	death
6	William Hale Barrett	1866–1941	1922–1941	—	—	Harding	death
7	Archibald Battle Lovett	1884–1945	1941–1945	—	—	F. Roosevelt	death
8	Francis Muir Scarlett	1891–1971	1946–1968	—	1968–1971	Truman	death
9	Alexander Lawrence Jr.	1906–1979	1968–1978	1970–1976	1978–1979	L. Johnson	death
10	Anthony Alaimo	1920–2009	1971–1991	1976–1990	1991–2009	Nixon	death
11	Berry Avant Edenfield	1934–2015	1978–2006	1990–1997	2006–2015	Carter	death
13	William Theodore Moore Jr.	1940–present	1994–2017	2004–2010	2017–2024	Clinton	retirement

== Chief judges ==
Chief judges have administrative responsibilities with respect to their district court. Unlike the Supreme Court, where one justice is specifically nominated to be chief, the office of chief judge rotates among the district court judges. To be chief, a judge must have been in active service on the court for at least one year, be under the age of 65, and have not previously served as chief judge.

A vacancy is filled by the judge highest in seniority among the group of qualified judges. The chief judge serves for a term of seven years, or until age 70, whichever occurs first. The age restrictions are waived if no members of the court would otherwise be qualified for the position.

When the office was created in 1948, the chief judge was the longest-serving judge who had not elected to retire, on what has since 1958 been known as senior status, or declined to serve as chief judge. After August 6, 1959, judges could not become or remain chief after turning 70 years old. The current rules have been in operation since October 1, 1982.

== Succession of seats ==
Seat 1
Seat reassigned from the District of Georgia on August 11, 1848 by 9 Stat. 280 (concurrent with Northern District)
Nicoll	1848–1861
Erskine	1865–1883
Seat reassigned solely to the Southern District on April 25, 1882 by 22 Stat. 47
Speer	1885–1918
Seat abolished on December 13, 1918 (temporary judgeship expired)

Seat 2
Seat established on March 3, 1915 by 38 Stat. 959 (temporary)
Lambdin	1915–1916
Seat became permanent upon the abolition of Seat 1 on December 13, 1918
Evans, Jr.	1917–1922
Barrett	1922–1941
Lovett	1941–1945
Scarlett	1946–1968
Lawrence, Jr.	1968–1978
Edenfield	1978–2006
Hall	2008–present

Seat 3
Seat established on June 2, 1970 by 84 Stat. 294
Alaimo	1971–1991
Moore, Jr.	1994–2017
Baker	2018–present

Seat 4
Seat established on October 20, 1978 by 92 Stat. 1629
Bowen, Jr.	1979–2006
Wood	2007–present

== U.S. Attorneys ==
- Sion A. Darnell 1882–86
- Dupont Guerry 1886–1901
- Marion Erwin 1901-12
- Alexander Akerman 1912–14
- Erle M. Donalson 1914–19
- John W. Bennett 1919–22
- F. G. Boatright 1922–27
- Charles L. Redding 1927–32
- Walter W. Sheppard 1932–33
- Charles L. Redding 1933
- J. Saxton Daniel 1933–53
- William C. Calhoun 1953–61
- Donald H. Fraser 1961–69 R.
- R. Jackson B. Smith, Jr. 1969–77
- William T. Moore, Jr. 1977–81
- Hinton R. Pierce 1981–92
- Jay D. Gardner 1992–94
- Harry Donival Dixon, Jr. 1994–2001
- Richard S. Thompson 2001–2004
- Paul B. Murphy 2004
- Lisa Godbey Wood 2004–2007
- Edmund A. Booth, Jr. 2007–2009
- Edward J. Tarver 2009–2017
- Bobby Christine 2017–2021
- David H. Estes 2021–2023
- Jill E. Steinberg 2023–2025
- Tara M. Lyons 2025
- Meg E. Heap 2025–

== See also ==
- Courts of Georgia
- List of current United States district judges
- List of United States federal courthouses in Georgia
- Henry C. Walthour, former Marshal of the Southern District
