= Archibald Battle Lovett =

American politician and judge from Georgia

Judge of the United States District Court for the Southern District of Georgia
- In office October 7, 1941 – December 28, 1945
- Appointed by: Franklin D. Roosevelt
- Preceded by: William H. Barrett
- Succeeded by: Francis Muir Scarlett

Personal details
- Born: Archibald Battle Lovett; June 21, 1884 Sylvania, Georgia
- Died: December 28, 1945 (aged 61)
- Education: Mercer University read law

Archibald Battle Lovett (June 21, 1884 – December 28, 1945) was a United States district judge of the United States District Court for the Southern District of Georgia.

== Education and career ==
Born in Sylvania, Georgia, Lovett attended Mercer University and read law to enter the bar in 1907. He was a prosecuting attorney of the Sylvania City Courts from 1914 to 1918, also serving as Mayor of Sylvania from 1914 to 1918. He was a Judge of the Superior Courts of Georgia from 1919 to 1921. He was in private practice in Savannah, Georgia from 1921 to 1941.

== Federal judicial service ==
On September 8, 1941, Lovett was nominated by President Franklin D. Roosevelt to a seat on the United States District Court for the Southern District of Georgia vacated by Judge William H. Barrett. Lovett was confirmed by the United States Senate on October 2, 1941, and received his commission on October 7, 1941. Lovett served in that capacity until his death on December 28, 1945.

== Sources ==
Legal offices
Preceded by William H. Barrett	Judge of the United States District Court for the Southern District of Georgia; 1941–1945	Succeeded by Francis Muir Scarlett
