= Otto Attila Gilbert =

American spy

Otto Attila Gilbert was an American spy. He was convicted of espionage in 1982 after paying $4,000 for classified documents provided by an undercover Army officer, and sentenced to fifteen years in prison.

Gilbert emigrated to the United States from Hungary in 1957, and became a naturalized citizen in 1964. Authorities said that Gilbert was working for the Hungarian Military Intelligence Service all along. Shortly before his arrest, Gilbert was living with his mother in Forest Hills, New York, but the two moved to Hungary.
