= Frank M. Scarlett Federal Building =

US Federal Courthouse and Post Office

- United States Post Office and Court House (Brunswick, Georgia)
- U.S. National Register of Historic Places
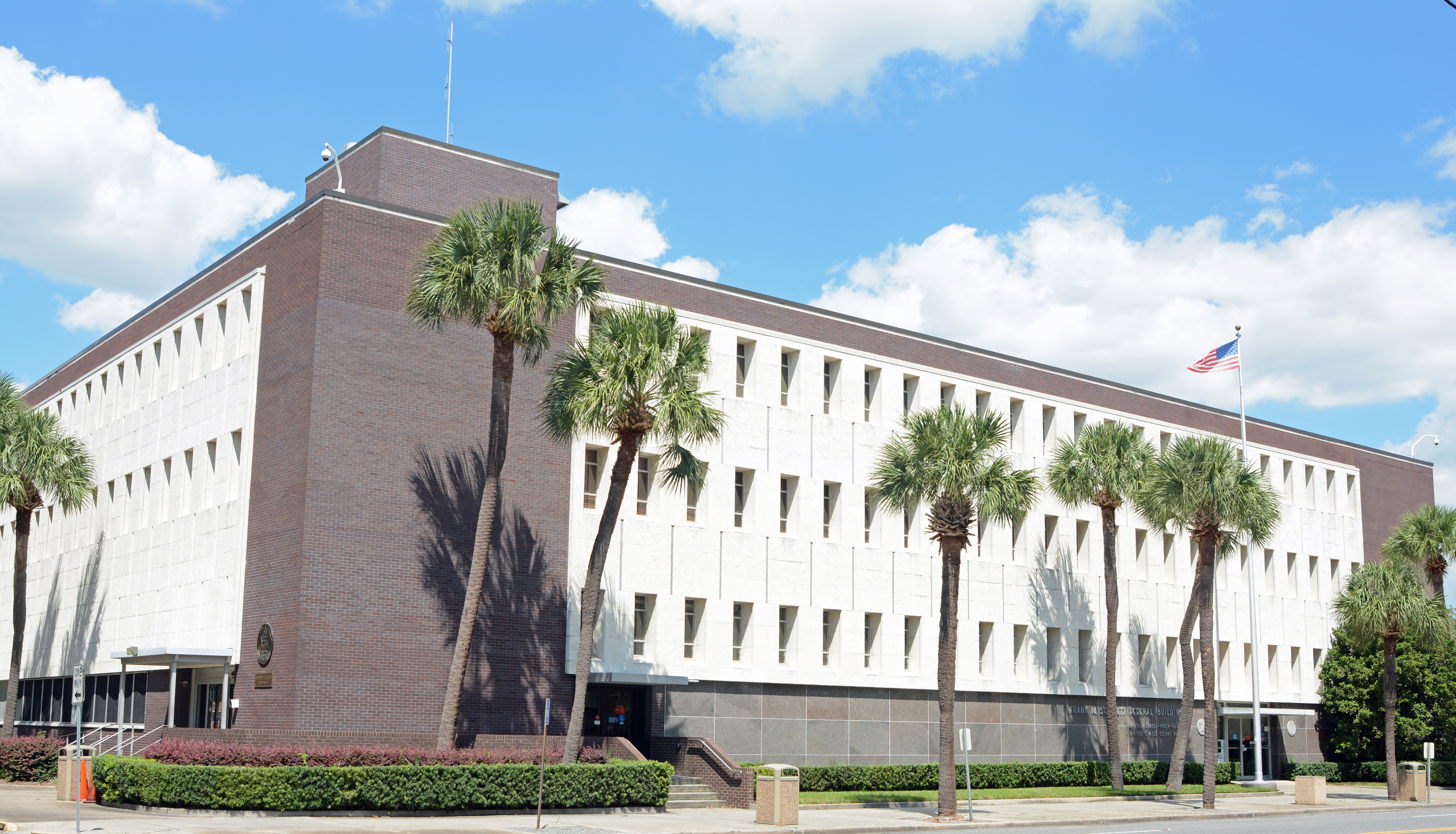

- Location within Georgia
- Location: 805 Gloucester Street, Brunswick, GA
- Coordinates: 31.15017°N 81.49237°W
- Built: 1959
- Architect: Francis Abreu and James Robeson
- Architectural style: Modern movement
- NRHP reference No.: 14000153
- Added to NRHP: April 15, 2014

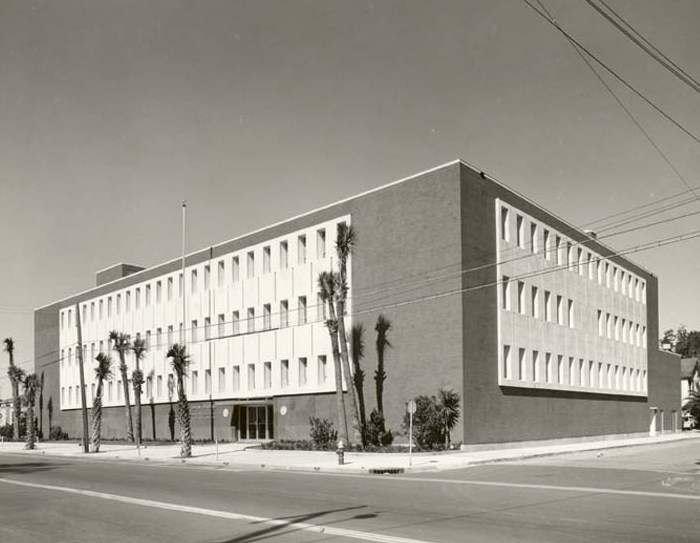

The Frank M. Scarlett Federal Building is a federal building of the United States located at 805 Gloucester Street in Brunswick, Georgia. Completed in 1959, it houses both a United States Post Office and operations of the United States District Court for the Southern District of Georgia. In December 1973, Senator Herman Talmadge introduced a bill in the United States Congress to rename the facility for segregationist district court judge Francis Muir Scarlett; this bill was passed into law on January 2, 1975. The building was added to the National Register of Historic Places in 2014. The east side of the building was remodeled in 2015-16.
