= John Cochran Nicoll =

American judge

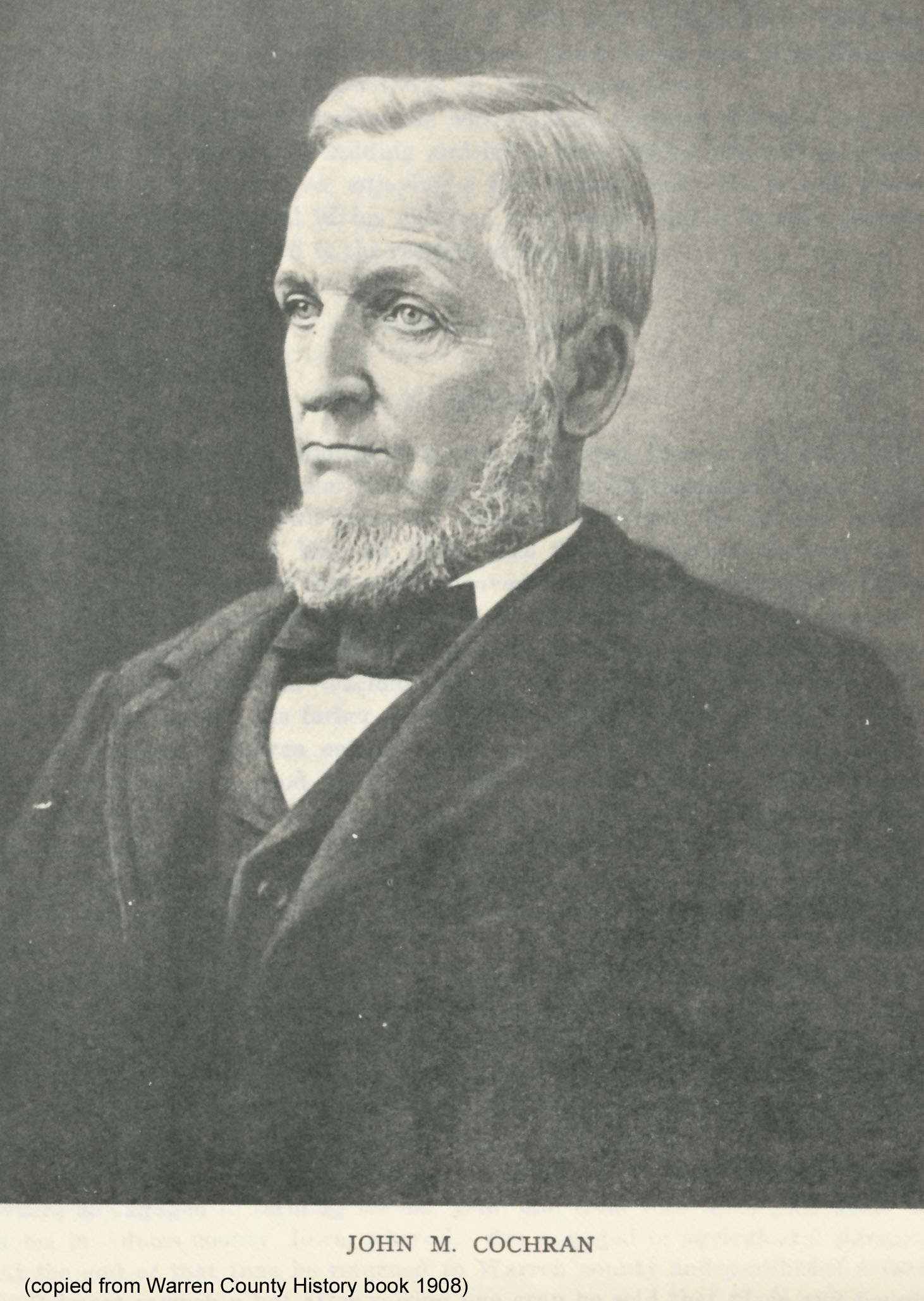

Judge of the United States District Court for the Northern District of Georgia Judge of the United States District Court for the Southern District of Georgia
- In office August 11, 1848 – January 19, 1861
- Appointed by: operation of law
- Preceded by: Seat established by 9 Stat. 280
- Succeeded by: John Erskine

Judge of the United States District Court for the District of Georgia
- In office May 11, 1839 – August 11, 1848
- Appointed by: Martin Van Buren
- Preceded by: Jeremiah La Touche Cuyler
- Succeeded by: Seat abolished

Personal details
- Born: John Cochran Nicoll; October 7, 1793 Savannah, Georgia
- Died: November 16, 1863 (aged 70) Savannah, Georgia
- Education: Litchfield Law School

John Cochran Nicoll (October 7, 1793 – November 16, 1863) was a United States district judge of the United States District Court for the District of Georgia, the United States District Court for the Northern District of Georgia and the United States District Court for the Southern District of Georgia.

== Education and career ==
Born on October 7, 1793, in Savannah, Georgia, Nicoll attended Litchfield Law School. He entered private practice in Savannah. He was a recorder for Savannah. He was a member of the Georgia House of Representatives. He was solicitor for the Eastern Judicial Circuit of Georgia from 1821 to 1822. He was a Judge of the Savannah City Court from 1824 to 1834, and from 1835 to 1838. He was a Judge of the Superior Court of Georgia for the Eastern Judicial Circuit from 1834 to 1835. He was Mayor of Savannah.

== Federal judicial service ==
Nicoll received a recess appointment from President Martin Van Buren on May 11, 1839, to a seat on the United States District Court for the District of Georgia vacated by Judge Jeremiah La Touche Cuyler. He was nominated to the same position by President Van Buren on January 23, 1840. He was confirmed by the United States Senate on February 17, 1840, and received his commission the same day. Nicoll was reassigned by operation of law to the United States District Court for the Northern District of Georgia and the United States District Court for the Southern District of Georgia on August 11, 1848, to a new joint seat authorized by 9 Stat. 280. His service terminated on January 19, 1861, due to his resignation.

== Later career and death ==
Following his resignation from the federal bench, Nicoll was the Confederate District Attorney for the District of Georgia from 1861 to 1863. He died on November 16, 1863, in Savannah.

== Sources ==
Legal offices
Preceded by Jeremiah La Touche Cuyler	Judge of the United States District Court for the District of Georgia; 1839–1848	Succeeded by Seat abolished
Preceded by Seat established by 9 Stat. 280	Judge of the United States District Court for the Northern District of Georgia; Judge of the United States District Court for the Southern District of Georgia; 1848–1861	Succeeded by John Erskine
