= R. Stan Baker =

American judge (born 1977)

Stan Baker
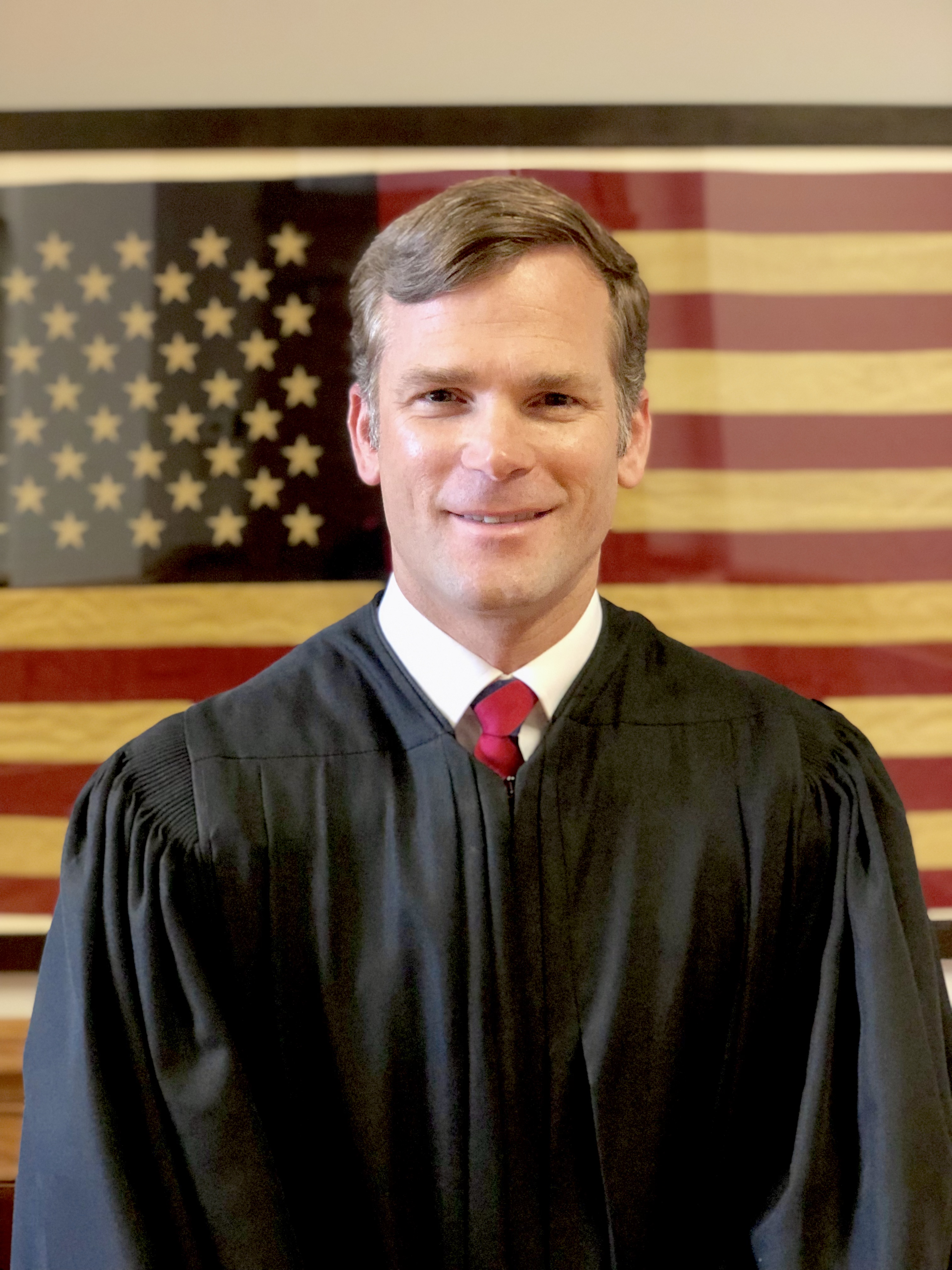

Chief Judge of the United States District Court for the Southern District of Georgia
- Incumbent
- Assumed office May 5, 2024
- Preceded by: James Randal Hall

Judge of the United States District Court for the Southern District of Georgia
- Incumbent
- Assumed office August 30, 2018
- Appointed by: Donald Trump
- Preceded by: William Theodore Moore Jr.

Personal details
- Born: Raymond Stanley Baker Jr. 1977 (age 48–49) Athens, Georgia, U.S.
- Education: Davidson College (BA); University of Georgia (JD)

Raymond Stanley Baker Jr., known professionally as R. Stan Baker (born 1977), is the chief United States district judge of the United States District Court for the Southern District of Georgia. He was formerly a United States magistrate judge of the same court.

== Biography ==
Baker earned his Bachelor of Arts from Davidson College and his Juris Doctor, magna cum laude, from the University of Georgia School of Law. From 1999 to 2001 he was a ranch hand for a farm ranch in Montana. Upon graduation from law school, he began his legal career by serving for two years as a law clerk to Judge William Theodore Moore Jr. of the United States District Court for the Southern District of Georgia. He worked for three different law firms based in Georgia and Alabama. He spent a decade in private practice representing a broad range of clients including individuals, small e-businesses, and large corporations. Baker litigated a wide range of civil, commercial, and criminal matters in state and federal courts across Georgia and throughout the country.

He was a member of the Federalist Society while at the University of Georgia School of Law from 2003 to 2004.

=== Federal judicial service ===
Baker served as a United States magistrate judge of the United States District Court for the Southern District of Georgia from February 3, 2015, to August 30, 2018. He succeeded James E. Graham.

On September 7, 2017, President Donald Trump nominated Baker to serve as a United States district judge of the United States District Court for the Southern District of Georgia, to the seat vacated by Judge William Theodore Moore Jr., who assumed senior status on February 28, 2017. On December 13, 2017, a hearing on his nomination was held before the Senate Judiciary Committee. On January 18, 2018, his nomination was reported out of committee by voice vote. On August 28, 2018, his nomination was confirmed by voice vote. He received his judicial commission on August 30, 2018.

Legal offices
| Preceded by William Theodore Moore Jr. | Judge of the United States District Court for the Southern District of Georgia; 2018–present | Incumbent |
| Preceded by James Randal Hall | Chief Judge of the United States District Court for the Southern District of Georgia; 2024–present | |
