= Simeon Soumaine =

Artist who specialized in flatware in the 1700s

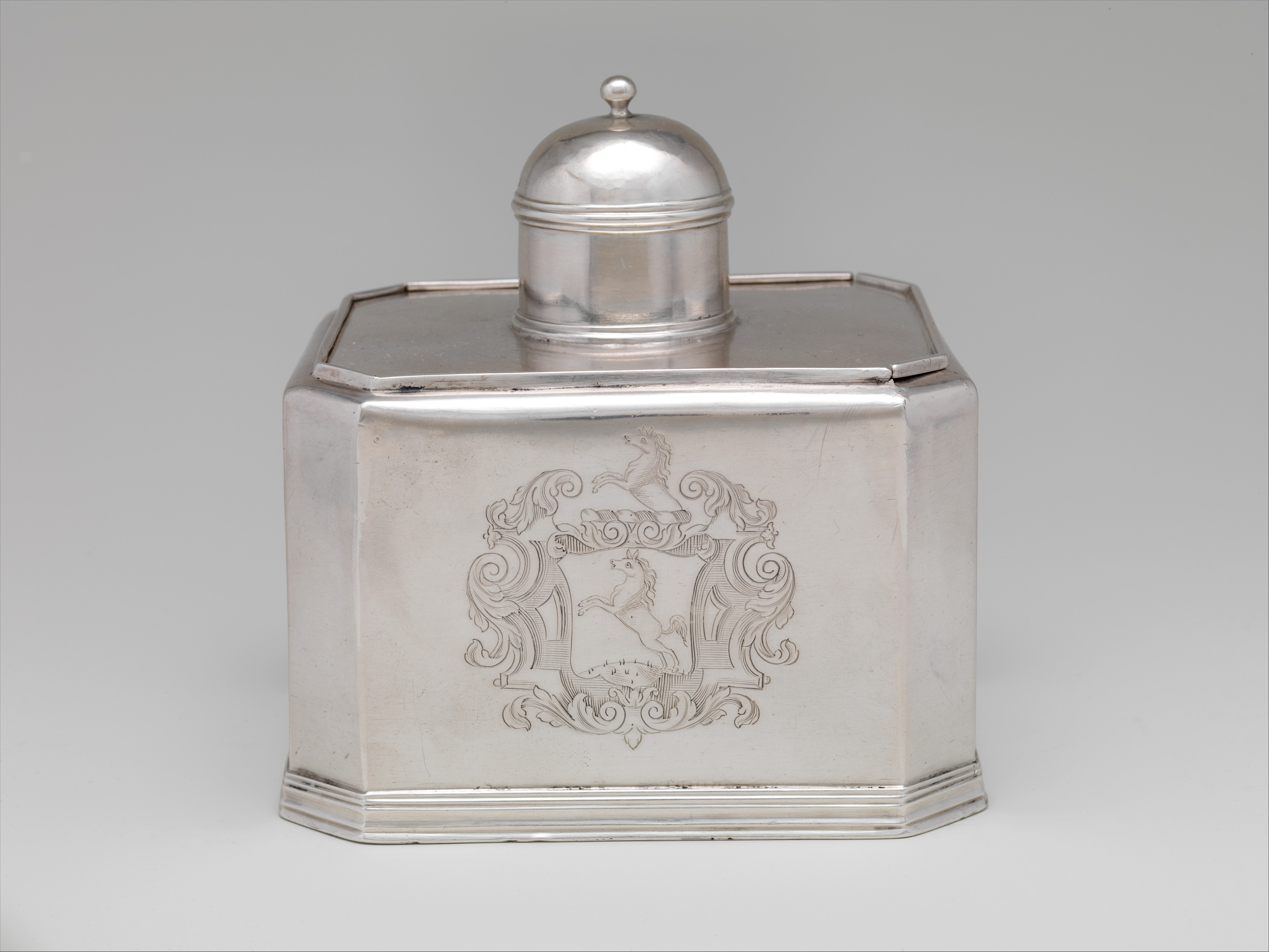
Sugar box by Simeon Soumaine, circa 1720

Simeon Soumaine (before June 10, 1685 – c. 1750) was a noted Huguenot-American silversmith, active in New York City.

Soumaine was born in London and christened there on June 10, 1685. He likely received his training in London before emigrating to New York by 1717. On February 17, 1717, William Anderson Jr. was apprenticed to him for seven years, a fact formally recognized a year later and recorded in August 1719. Another apprentice, Elias Pelletreau (1726–1810), served under Soumaine from January 12, 1741, for seven years.

In New York City, Soumaine married Susanna Bourdett and is documented to have owned at least one slave. During the "Negro Plot of 1741," his slave, Tom, informed authorities that conspirators had asked him to procure swords from Soumaine's shop. Additionally, in 1743, Soumaine advertised the theft of a pepper box.

Soumaine advertised a lottery of his works in the American Weekly Mercury, March 23, 1727, as follows:

This is to give Notice to all Gentlemen and others, That a Lottery is to be drawn at Mr John Stevens in Perth Amboy for £501 of Silver and Gold work wrought by Simeon Soumain of New York, Gold-Smith, all of the newest Fashion. The highest Prize consists of an Eight square Tea Pot, six Tea Spoons, Skimmer and Tongues, Valued at £18 3s 6d. The lowest Prize consists of Twelve Shillings Value. There is 278 Prizes in all, and their is only five Blank to each Prize. Tickets are given out at Six Shillings York money or Seven Shillings Jersey Money for each Ticket at the House of Mr John Stevens in Amboy, at Mr Lewis Carrees in Aliens Town, at Mr Jolines in Elizabeth Town, at Mr Cortlandts at Second River, by Mr Andrew Bradford in Philadelphia, at Mr Samuel Clowse in Jamaica in Long Island, and by Simeon Soumain in the City of New York, at which last Place, the Goods so to be drawn are to be seen, and the said Goods are to be valued and apprised by Mr Peter Van Dyke, and Mr Charles Leroux, two GoldSmiths in the city of New York. And said Lottery is to be drawn the 22nd day of May next anno. 1727. If said Lottery be full sooner it will be drawn before the 22nd of May next.

His work is collected in the Brooklyn Museum, Clark Art Institute, Fine Arts Museums of San Francisco, Harvard Art Museums/The Fogg, Metropolitan Museum of Art, Museum of Fine Arts, Boston, National Museum of American History, New-York Historical Society, Winterthur Museum, and Yale University Art Gallery.
