= Francis Muir Scarlett =

American judge

Senior Judge of the United States District Court for the Southern District of Georgia
- In office August 2, 1968 – November 18, 1971

Judge of the United States District Court for the Southern District of Georgia
- In office February 14, 1946 – August 2, 1968
- Appointed by: Harry S. Truman
- Preceded by: Archibald Battle Lovett
- Succeeded by: Alexander Atkinson Lawrence Jr.

Personal details
- Born: Francis Muir Scarlett; June 9, 1891 Brunswick, Georgia
- Died: November 18, 1971 (aged 80)
- Education: University of Georgia School of Law (LL.B.)

Francis Muir Scarlett (June 9, 1891 – November 18, 1971) was a United States district judge of the United States District Court for the Southern District of Georgia.

== Education and career ==
Born in Brunswick, Georgia, Scarlett received a Bachelor of Laws from the University of Georgia School of Law in 1913. He was in private practice in Brunswick from 1913 to 1946. He was solicitor for the City Court of Brunswick from 1919 to 1929.

== Federal judicial service ==
On January 24, 1946, Scarlett was nominated by President Harry S. Truman to a seat on the United States District Court for the Southern District of Georgia vacated by Judge Archibald Battle Lovett. Scarlett was confirmed by the United States Senate on February 13, 1946, and received his commission on February 14, 1946.

Scarlett was among the most staunchly segregationist district court judges during the civil rights movement. After Brown v. Board of Education, Scarlett attempted to relitigate because he believed that black people were inherently inferior, so that separate schools was a fair classification of students. In Scarlett's view, separate school systems were thus fair because both races would be harmed by

lumping together coherent groups having distinguishable educability characteristics

His persistent efforts to thwart black plaintiffs in Chatham, Glynn and Richmond counties would ensure that no integration took place there until long after it had occurred in most of the Deep South. When in 1963 Scarlett found that the Chatham County schools were segregated, he allowed a group of white students to intervene and present evidence that black students could not work academically nearly as well as white students. In Scarlett's view, black children's sense of rejection by white children was increased by intermixture, and the increase in sense of rejection was in his view proportional to the amount of interaction between white and black children. Scarlett ordered students to be assigned according to intelligence tests, and teachers to be assigned and paid according to their own intelligence.

Elbert Parr Tuttle, one of the "Fifth Circuit Four", referred to Judge Scarlett as

first among equals of the obstructionist politicians and judges who successfully forestalled the dismantling of Jim Crow.

Scarlett would be reversed repeatedly by the Fifth Circuit during the middle 1960s, and by the middle of 1968 he was under pressure to take senior status as steps toward desegregation were finally taken. Scarlett assumed senior status on August 2, 1968, serving in that capacity until his death on November 18, 1971.

== Honor ==
The Frank M. Scarlett Federal Building in Brunswick is named for him.

== Sources ==
Legal offices
| Preceded by Archibald Battle Lovett | Judge of the United States District Court for the Southern District of Georgia; 1946–1968 | Succeeded by Alexander Atkinson Lawrence Jr. |
