= Anthony Alaimo =

American judge

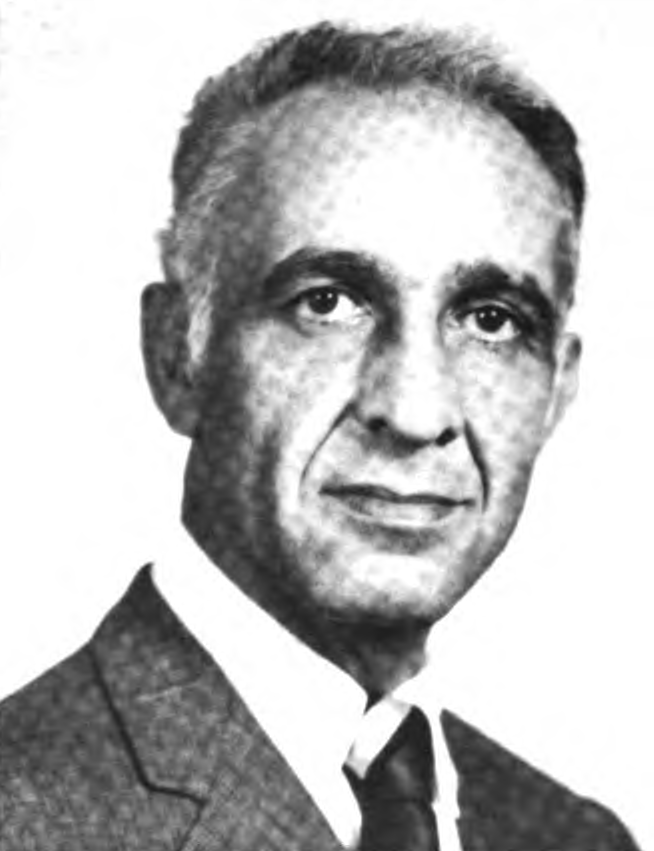
- Photo taken in 1990

Senior Judge of the United States District Court for the Southern District of Georgia
- In office July 1, 1991 – December 30, 2009

Chief Judge of the United States District Court for the Southern District of Georgia
- In office 1976–1990
- Preceded by: Alexander Atkinson Lawrence Jr.
- Succeeded by: Berry Avant Edenfield

Judge of the United States District Court for the Southern District of Georgia
- In office December 9, 1971 – July 1, 1991
- Appointed by: Richard Nixon
- Preceded by: Seat established by 84 Stat. 294
- Succeeded by: William Theodore Moore Jr.

Personal details
- Born: Anthony Alfred Alaimo; March 29, 1920 Termini Imerese, Sicily, Italy
- Died: December 30, 2009 (aged 89) Brunswick, Georgia, U.S.
- Education: Ohio Northern University (BA); Emory University School of Law (JD)

Anthony Alfred Alaimo (March 29, 1920 – December 30, 2009) was a United States district judge of the United States District Court for the Southern District of Georgia.

== Education and career ==
Born in Termini Imerese in Sicily, Italy, Alaimo received a Bachelor of Arts degree from Ohio Northern University in 1940, and then served as an aviator in the United States Army Air Corps during World War II, from 1941 to 1945. He achieved the rank of Second Lieutenant. Alaimo spent much of World War II as a prisoner of war, captured after the plane he was co-piloting was shot down.

After the war, Alaimo received a Juris Doctor from Emory University School of Law in 1948 and entered the private practice of law in Atlanta, Georgia from 1948 to 1957, and in Brunswick, Georgia from 1957 to 1971.

== Federal judicial service ==
On November 29, 1971, President Richard Nixon nominated Alaimo to a new seat on the United States District Court for the Southern District of Georgia created by 84 Stat. 294. He was confirmed by the United States Senate on December 2, 1971, and received his commission on December 9, 1971. He served as Chief Judge from 1976 to 1990, and assumed senior status on July 1, 1991, serving in that role until his death. Alaimo was also a member of the Judicial Conference of the United States from 1990 to 1993.

The pace of Alaimo's court earned it the nickname "the Rocket Docket."

== Death ==
Alaimo died on December 30, 2009, after being admitted to a Southeast Georgia Health System hospital in Brunswick, Georgia for treatment of an undisclosed condition. He was 89 years old.

== Sources ==
- Anthony Alaimo receives an honorary degree at the age of 89
- Coppola, Vincent. 2009. The Sicilian Judge: Anthony Alaimo, an American Hero. Macon, GA: Mercer University Press.

Legal offices
| Preceded by Seat established by 84 Stat. 294 | Judge of the United States District Court for the Southern District of Georgia; 1971–1991 | Succeeded by William Theodore Moore Jr. |
| Preceded by Alexander Atkinson Lawrence Jr. | Chief Judge of the United States District Court for the Southern District of Georgia; 1976–1990 | Succeeded by Berry Avant Edenfield |
