= Land (surname) =

Land is a surname. Notable people with the surname include:

- Ailsa Land, British professor
- Benjamin Land, American judge
- Clay D. Land (born 1960), American judge
- David Land (1918–1995), English impresario and theatre producer
- Edwin H. Land (1909–1991), American scientist and inventor
- Frank Land (born 1928), British information systems researcher
- Frank S. Land (1890–1959), American founder of Order of DeMolay
- Frank William Land (born c.1961), British mathematician
- Greg Land (born c.1965), American comic book artist
- Harold Land (1928–2001), American tenor saxophonist
- Heather Land, American comedian
- Isaiah Land (born 2000), American football player
- John Henry Land (1918–2011), American judge and politician
- Kenneth Land (born 1942), American sociologist
- Lois Rhea Land (1916-2004), American composer
- Michael Land (born 1961), American composer and musician
- Michael F. Land (1942–2020), British neurobiologist
- Nick Land (born 1962), British philosopher
- Scott Land (born 1962), American puppeteer and actor
- Scott Land (DJ), American DJ
- Susan K. Land (born 1963), American software engineer
- Sydney Land (1995–2016), American victim of unsolved shooting
- Ted J. Land (1936–2018), American politician
- Terri Lynn Land (born 1958), American politician
- Tommy Land (born 1955), American businessman and politician
