= Alcovy (disambiguation) =

Alcovy may refer to:

- Alcovy, Georgia
- Alcovy Mountain
- Alcovy River
