= Abraham Conger =

Abraham Conger may refer to:

- Abraham Benjamin Conger (1887–1953), American politician and judge from Georgia
- Abraham Bogart Conger (1814–1887), American farmer, lawyer, and politician from New York
