= Horace Ward =

American lawyer and judge

Senior Judge of the United States District Court for the Northern District of Georgia
- In office December 31, 1993 – April 23, 2016

Judge of the United States District Court for the Northern District of Georgia
- In office December 6, 1979 – December 31, 1993
- Appointed by: Jimmy Carter
- Preceded by: Seat established
- Succeeded by: Willis B. Hunt Jr.

Member of the Georgia State Senate from the 39th district
- In office 1965 – January 13, 1975
- Preceded by: Oby Brewer
- Succeeded by: Julian Bond

Personal details
- Born: Horace Taliaferro Ward; July 29, 1927 LaGrange, Georgia, U.S.
- Died: April 23, 2016 (aged 88) Atlanta, Georgia, U.S.
- Education: Morehouse College (BA); Clark Atlanta University (MA); Northwestern University (JD)

Horace Taliaferro Ward (July 29, 1927 – April 23, 2016) was a lawyer, state legislator, and judge in Georgia. He challenged the racially discriminatory practices at the University of Georgia School of Law and was the first African American to serve as a United States district judge of the United States District Court for the Northern District of Georgia. He served in the Georgia Senate from 1965 to 1974.

== Education and career ==
Ward was born in LaGrange, Georgia. He received an Artium Baccalaureus degree from Morehouse College in 1949. He received a Master of Arts from Atlanta University (now Clark Atlanta University) in 1950. He received a Juris Doctor from Northwestern University Pritzker School of Law in 1959. He was an instructor at the Arkansas AM&N College (now the University of Arkansas at Pine Bluff) from 1950 to 1951. He was an instructor at Alabama State College from 1951 to 1953. He was in the United States Army from 1953 to 1955, attaining the rank of Corporal. He was an instructor at Alabama State College from 1955 to 1956. He was a claims authorizer for the United States Social Security Administration in Chicago, Illinois, from 1959 to 1960. He was in private practice of law in Atlanta, Georgia, from 1960 to 1974. He was a deputy city attorney of Atlanta from 1969 to 1970. He was an assistant county attorney of Fulton County, Georgia, from 1970 to 1974. He was a member of the Georgia State Senate from 1965 to 1974. He was a Judge of the Civil Court of Fulton County, Georgia from 1974 to 1977. He was a judge of the Superior Court of Georgia from 1977 to 1979.

== Federal judicial service ==
Ward was nominated by President Jimmy Carter on November 1, 1979, to the United States District Court for the Northern District of Georgia, to a new seat created by 92 Stat. 1629. He was confirmed by the United States Senate on December 5, 1979, and received his commission on December 6, 1979. He assumed senior status on December 31, 1993, serving in that status until his death.

== Personal life and death ==
Ward was a member of Alpha Phi Alpha fraternity.

Ward died on April 23, 2016, in Atlanta.

== See also ==
- List of African-American federal judges
- List of African-American jurists
- List of first minority male lawyers and judges in Georgia

Legal offices
Preceded by Seat established by 92 Stat. 1629	Judge of the United States District Court for the Northern District of Georgia; 1979–1993	Succeeded by Willis B. Hunt Jr.
