= Willie Louis Sands =

American judge (born 1949)

W. Louis Sands

Senior Judge of the United States District Court for the Middle District of Georgia
- Incumbent
- Assumed office April 12, 2014

Chief Judge of the United States District Court for the Middle District of Georgia
- In office 2001–2006
- Preceded by: Duross Fitzpatrick
- Succeeded by: Hugh Lawson

Judge of the United States District Court for the Middle District of Georgia
- In office May 9, 1994 – April 12, 2014
- Appointed by: Bill Clinton
- Preceded by: Seat established by 104 Stat. 5089
- Succeeded by: Leslie Abrams Gardner

Personal details
- Born: April 12, 1949 (age 77) Bradley, Georgia, U.S.
- Education: Mercer University (BA, JD)

Willie Louis Sands (born April 12, 1949) is a senior United States district judge of the United States District Court for the Middle District of Georgia.

== Education and career ==
Sands was born in Bradley, Georgia. He received a Bachelor of Arts from Mercer University in 1971 and a Juris Doctor from Mercer University School of Law in 1974. He was a second lieutenant in the United States Army Reserve Signal Corps in 1974, remaining in the Reserve until 1980 reaching the rank of captain. He was an assistant district attorney of the Macon, Georgia Judicial Circuit from 1975 to 1978. He was an assistant United States attorney for the Middle District of Georgia from 1978 to 1987. He was in private practice in Macon from 1987 to 1991, and was a judge on the Superior Court, Macon Judicial District from 1991 to 1993.

=== Federal judicial service ===
On February 9, 1994, Sands was nominated by President Bill Clinton to a new seat on the United States District Court for the Middle District of Georgia created by 104 Stat. 5089. He was confirmed by the United States Senate on May 6, 1994, and received his commission on May 9, 1994. He served as chief judge from 2001 to 2006. He assumed senior status on April 12, 2014.

== See also ==
- List of African-American federal judges
- List of African-American jurists
- List of first minority male lawyers and judges in Georgia

== Sources ==
Legal offices
| Preceded by Seat established by 104 Stat. 5089 | Judge of the United States District Court for the Middle District of Georgia; 1994–2014 | Succeeded by Leslie Abrams Gardner |
| Preceded by Duross Fitzpatrick | Chief Judge of the United States District Court for the Middle District of Georgia; 2001–2006 | Succeeded by Hugh Lawson |
