= Usha Rodrigues =

American lawyer (born 1973)

Dean of the University of Georgia School of Law
- Incumbent
- Assumed office January 1, 2025
- Preceded by: Peter B. Rutledge

Personal details
- Born: Usha R. Rodrigues; 1973 (age 52–53)
- Education: Georgetown University (BA); University of Wisconsin–Madison (MA); University of Virginia (JD)

Academic work
- Discipline: Law
- Sub-discipline: Corporate law; Securities law; Corporate Governance; Commercial Law; Business ethics

Usha R. Rodrigues is an American legal scholar. She is the Dean and M.E. Kilpatrick Chair of Corporate Finance and Securities Law at the University of Georgia School of Law.

== Early life and education ==
Rodrigues is a native of Potomac, Maryland. She earned a Bachelor of Arts in English summa cum laude from Georgetown University, a Master of Arts in comparative literature, also summa cum laude, from the University of Wisconsin–Madison, and a Juris Doctor from the University of Virginia School of Law, where she was editor-in-chief of the Virginia Law Review and earned membership in the Order of the Coif.

== Career ==
Rodrigues served as a law clerk for U.S. Court of Appeals Judge Thomas L. Ambro. From 2002 to 2005, she specialized in technology transactions and corporate law as an associate at the multinational law firm Wilson Sonsini Goodrich & Rosati that specializes in business, securities, venture capital, and intellectual property law. She joined the University of Georgia School of Law in 2005 and became the M.E. Kilpatrick Chair of Corporate Finance and Securities Law in 2014. In 2022, Rodrigues was selected to serve as the interim vice provost for academic affairs of the University of Georgia. Her scholarship focuses on corporate law, business ethics, and United States securities regulation. Rodrigues has also been cited as an expert on special-purpose acquisition companies.
