= Will Wooten =

American prosecutor

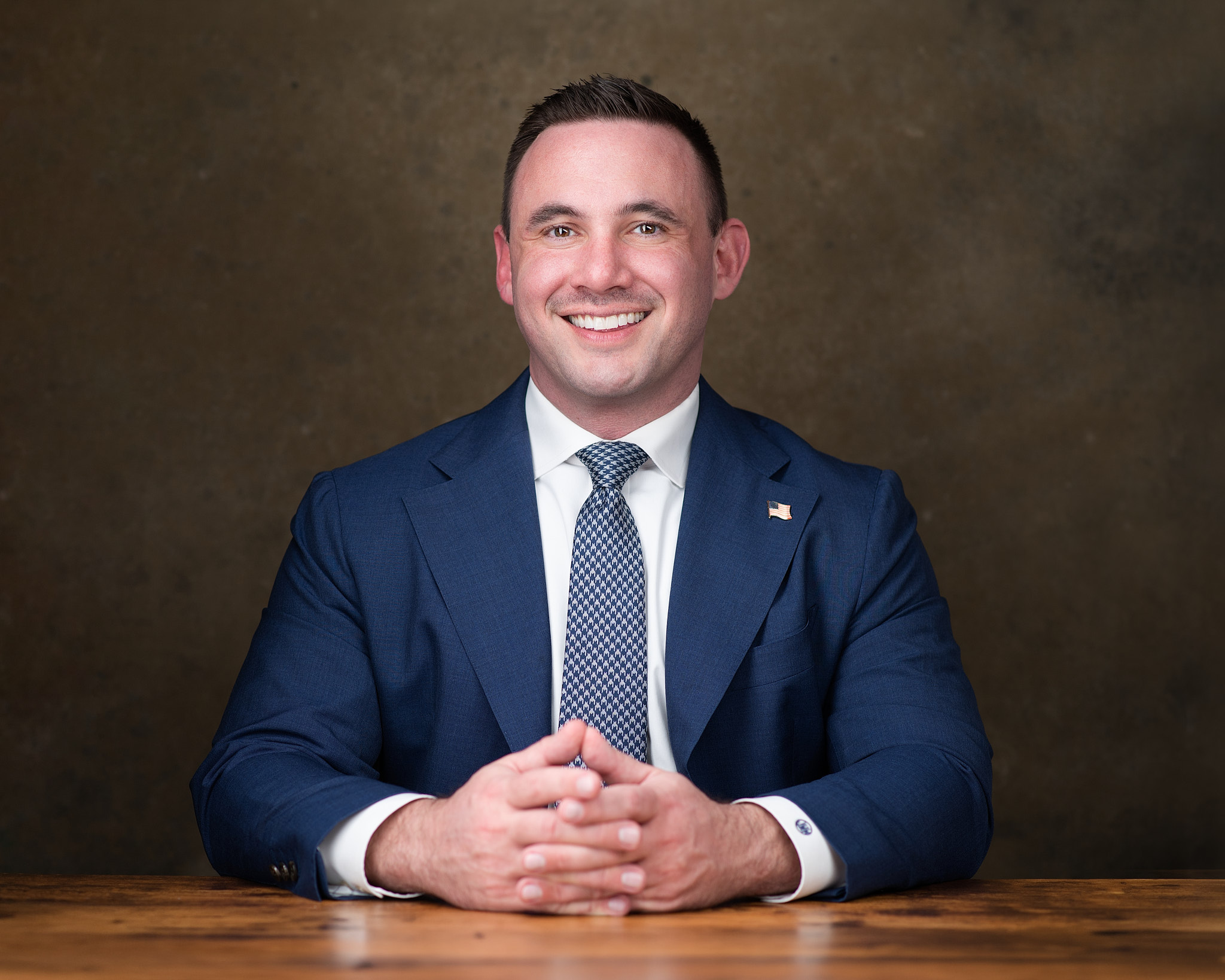
- Born: Columbia, South Carolina, U.S.
- Education: University of Miami (BA); Emory University School of Law (JD)
- Known for: 2020 Georgia election racketeering case

Will Wooten is an American prosecutor who serves as a Deputy District Attorney in Fulton County, Georgia. He has worked as a public defender and prosecutor in multiple jurisdictions and was part of the prosecution team in the Georgia election interference case. In 2026, he became a candidate for the Georgia Court of Appeals, which he lost.

== Early life and education ==
Wooten grew up in Columbia, South Carolina. His father was a lawyer and his uncle, Judge Terry L. Wooten, is a senior U.S. district judge in South Carolina. Wooten received his undergraduate degree from the University of Miami, where he initially studied marine biology and then shifted in the middle of his four years, graduating with a degree in journalism. He spent two and a half years at the Miami Herald, and then decided to shift towards a legal career. He earned a Juris Doctor degree from Emory University School of Law, where he has since gone on to teach as well.

== Career ==
Wooten began his legal career as a public defender in a rural judicial circuit outside Knoxville, Tennessee, representing indigent defendants, before returning to the Atlanta area in 2018. He spent four years at the Clayton County District Attorney's office prosecuting criminal cases and also spent time at the Gwinnett County Solicitor-General's office.

In January 2021, Fulton County District Attorney Fani Willis brought Wooten into her office to lead the white-collar crime unit inside the DA's office. He announced the formation of a Fulton County District Attorney LGBTQ+ Crimes Victim Vigil, which works with members of the LGBTQ community to ensure that crimes involving them are handled correctly. Wooten noted that the committee planned to hold town halls, and the committee wanted "queer people to know there are queer people in our office."

In addition to his work on the election interference case, Wooten worked on several other cases, including a RICO case against members of the PDE gang that was investigated for two years by his unit, the arrest of a fake dentist who advertised themselves as being Atlanta's premier 'veneer' specialist, and a RICO case against the husband of a co-host from the The Steve Harvey Morning Show who defrauded victims and took their assets.

=== 2020 election influence case ===
District Attorney Willis assigned Wooten to the Georgia election racketeering case prosecuting President Donald Trump for alleged election interference six months after he started in the role. As soon as she warned him that he was going to be brought onto the case, Wooten shut down his social media and stopped doing any interviews. Wooten was one of two members of the District Attorney's office to attend grand jury hearings for the case.

In an interview with Georgia Public Broadcasting, Wooten noted that the state's position was that the time estimate to hear the case would be the same, whether the RICO prosecutions were separated between the 19 defendants of if they were heard together. Wooten was quoted by WSB-TV denying allegations that the prosecution withheld evidence from the defense. He testified in a hearing in South Carolina to explain the grand jury process and to attempt to compel testimony from Representative Mark Meadows in the case. Wooten also was the prosecutor at trial in the case of Misty Hampton, the former Coffee County Elections Director.

=== Campaign for Court of Appeals ===
Wooten announced his candidacy on March 5, 2026 for the Georgia Court of Appeals, challenging incumbent Judge E. Trenton Brown III as a part of the larger 2026 Georgia Court of Appeals election. Brown had previously authored a majority opinion for the Court of Appeals barring District Attorney Fani Willis's office from prosecuting the Trump 2020 election influence case, in which Wooten had served as a prosecutor.

The election is formally nonpartisan, as are all judicial campaigns in Georgia, though candidates are permitted to campaign and raise funds. Wooten's campaign has emphasized themes of equal application of the law and the role of courts in reviewing government power. In an interview with The Atlanta Journal-Constitution, he stated that “the law has to apply the same to everyone,” while declining to comment directly on the election interference case due to judicial ethics rules because of his involvement in the case. If he was elected, he would have been the first member of the LGBTQ community to hold statewide office in Georgia. Wooten lost to the incumbent, Judge Brown III.
