= 2026 Georgia Court of Appeals election =

- May 19, 2026

The 2026 Georgia Court of Appeals election was held on May 19, 2026, to elect five judges to the Georgia Court of Appeals. The elections are officially nonpartisan, though candidates may receive the support of political parties.

Since 1896, justices on the Supreme Court and judges on the Court of Appeals have been directly elected in statewide elections. Judicial elections were made non-partisan in 1983. Elections for nonpartisan state judgeships have been held on the date of the legislative primary since 2012, and were previously held on the general election ballot in November during even-numbered years.

== Sara Doyle's seat ==
=== Candidates ===
==== Declared ====
- Sara Doyle, incumbent judge

=== Results ===
Sarah Doyle's seat
Candidate	Votes	%
Sara Doyle (incumbent)	1,742,244	100.00
Total votes	1,742,244	100.00

== E. Trenton Brown III's seat ==
=== Candidates ===
==== Declared ====
- E. Trenton Brown III, incumbent judge
- Will Wooten, deputy Fulton County district attorney

=== Endorsements ===
Will Wooten

Organizations

- Georgia AFL-CIO
- Georgia Conservation Voters
- Georgia Equality
- LGBTQ Victory Fund
- Savannah Indivisible
- UFCW Local 1996
- Young Democrats of Georgia

Political parties

- Democratic Party of Georgia
- Athens-Clarke County Democrats
- Clayton County Democrats
- Emanuel County Democratic Committee
- Muscogee County Democratic Committee
- Pickens County Democratic Committee

=== Results ===
Results by county: Brown: 50–60%; 60–70%; 70–80%; 80–90%; Wooten: 50–60%

E. Trenton Brown III's seat
Candidate	Votes	%
E. Trenton Brown III (incumbent)	1,203,641	63.81
Will Wooten	682,614	36.19
Total votes	1,886,255	100.00

== Elizabeth Gobeil's seat ==
=== Candidates ===
==== Declared ====
- Elizabeth Gobeil, incumbent judge
- Fatima Harris Felton, family law attorney

=== Endorsements ===
Fatima Harris Felton

Organizations

- Savannah and Sweetwater Indivisible
- Young Democrats of Georgia

Political parties

- Pickens County Democratic Committee

=== Results ===
Results by county: Gobeil: 50–60%; 60–70%; 70–80%; 80–90%; >90%; Felton: 50–60%; 60–70%

Elizabeth Gobeil's seat
Candidate	Votes	%
Elizabeth Gobeil (incumbent)	1,066,853	56.50
Fatima Harris Felton	821,368	43.50
Total votes	1,888,221	100.00

== J. Wade Padgett's seat ==
=== Candidates ===
==== Declared ====
- J. Wade Padgett, incumbent judge

=== Results ===
J. Wade Padgett's seat
Candidate	Votes	%
J. Wade Padgett (incumbent)	1,723,976	100.00
Total votes	1,723,976	100.00

== D. Todd Markle's seat ==
=== Candidates ===
==== Declared ====
- D. Todd Markle, incumbent judge

=== Results ===
D. Todd Markle's seat
Candidate	Votes	%
D. Todd Markle (incumbent)	1,722,233	100.00
Total votes	1,722,233	100.00
