= List of first minority male lawyers and judges in Georgia =

This is a list of the first minority male lawyer(s) and judge(s) in Georgia. It includes the year in which the men were admitted to practice law (in parentheses). Also included are other distinctions such as the first minority men in their state to graduate from law school or become a political figure.

== Firsts in Georgia's history ==
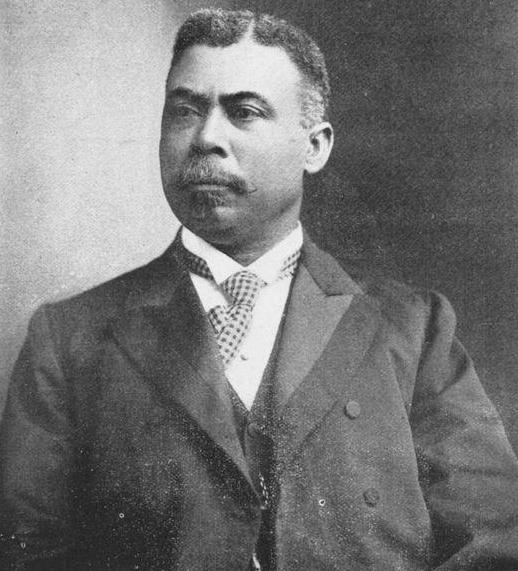
Judson Whitlock Lyons: One of the first African American male lawyers in Georgia (1884)

=== Lawyers ===
- First African American males: Styles Hutchins (1878) and Judson Whitlocke Lyons (1884)
- First African American male to practice before the Supreme Court of Georgia: Henry Moses Porter in 1901
- First Asian American male prosecutor: David Synyoung Lee
- First Asian American male (who is of Korean descent) to become a managing partner of a Georgia law firm: Han C. Choi

=== State judges ===
- First African American male (judge): James M. Simms in 1871
- First African American male after Reconstruction (judge): Austin "A.T." Walden (1911) in 1964
- First African American male (trial court): Horace Ward (1959) in 1974
- First African American male (Georgia Court of Appeals): Robert Benham in 1984
- First African American male (temporary; Supreme Court of Georgia): Clarence Cooper in 1985
- First African American male (permanent; Supreme Court of Georgia and Chief Justice): Robert Benham (1970) in 1989 and 1995 respectively
- First Asian American male elected (state court): Alvin "Al" T. Wong (1976) in 1998
- First Korean American (male) (judicial office): Chung Hun Lee (1983) in 1999
- First Hispanic American male (state court): Roland Castellanos in 1999
- First Hispanic American male (trial court): J. Antonio DelCampo in 2002
- First Jewish American male (Chief Judge; Georgia Court of Appeals): Arnold Shulman
- First African American male (Chief Judge; Georgia Court of Appeals): John "Jack" H. Ruffin Jr. in 2005
- First Asian American male (juvenile court): Tony Baker in 2007
- First Asian American male elected (Cambodian descent) (superior court): Meng H. Lim (1998) in 2014
- First Hispanic American male (superior court): Dean Carlos Bucci (1997) in 2015
- First Vietnamese American (male) (municipal court): Ethan Pham in 2018
- First Filipino American male: Bryan Ramos in 2023
- First South Asian male: Samir Patel in 2024

=== Federal judges ===
- First African American male (federal court): Horace Ward (1959) in 1979
- First African American male (U.S. District Court of the Middle District of Georgia): Willie Louis Sands (1974) in 1994

=== Attorney General of Georgia ===
- First African American male: Thurbert Baker from 1997-2011
- First Jewish American male: Sam Olens from 2011-2016

=== Assistant Solicitor General of Georgia ===
- First Iranian American male: Mazi Mazloom (1998)

=== United States Attorneys ===
- First African American male (Southern District of Georgia): Ed Tarver (1991) in 2009
- First Asian American male (Korean descent) (Northern District of Georgia): B. J. Pak in 2018

=== District Attorney ===
- First African American male elected: Paul L. Howard, Jr. in 1997
- First South Asian male: Samir Patel in 2023

=== Political office ===
- First openly gay male (Korean descent) (elected to the state legislature): Sam Park in 2017

=== Associations ===
- First Asian American male president (Council of State Court Judges in Georgia): Alvin "Al" T. Wong (1976) in 2021
- First Latino American male president (State Bar of Georgia): J. Antonio DelCampo in 2023

== Firsts in local history ==
- Chevene Bowers King (1952): First African American male lawyer to practice in Southwest Georgia
- Alvin "Al" T. Wong (1976): First Asian American male to be elected as a judge in the Southeastern United States
- Kenneth Dious: First African American male lawyer in Northeast Georgia
- Miguel Dominguez: First Latino American male to work as a prosecutor in the Atlanta Judicial Circuit
- Jared Williams: First African American male to serve as the District Attorney of the Augusta Judicial Circuit (2020) [Burke, Columbia, and Augusta-Richmond Counties, Georgia]
- Stephen Schuster: First Jewish male elected as a judge in Cobb County, Georgia (2004)
- Nathan Wade: First African American male to serve as a municipal court judge in Cobb County, Georgia (2010)
- John "Jack" H. Ruffin Jr.: First African American male admitted to the Augusta Bar Association (1961) and to serve as a Superior Court judge in the Augusta Judicial Circuit (1986) [Columbia and Richmond Counties, Georgia]
- Bill Pledger (c. 1880s): First African American male lawyer in Atlanta, Georgia [DeKalb County and Fulton County, Georgia]
- Clarence Cooper (1967): First African American male Judge of the Atlanta Municipal Court (DeKalb County and Fulton County, Georgia; 1975). He would later become a district court judge.
- Edward L. Baety (1968): First African American male judge of the municipal traffic court in Atlanta, Georgia (DeKalb County and Fulton County, Georgia; 1975)
- C.B. King: First African American male lawyer in Albany, Dougherty County, Georgia
- Leonard Danley: First African American male magistrate judge in Douglasville, Douglas County, Georgia
- Horace J. Johnson Jr. (1982): First African American male lawyer in Newton County, Georgia. He later became the first African American male to serve as a Judge of the Alcovy Judicial Circuit in 2002. [Newton and Walton Counties, Georgia]
- Willie Louis Sands (1974): First African American male judge in Bibb County, Georgia
- Eugene H. Gadsden: First African American male admitted to the Savannah Bar Association. In 1979, he became the first African American male to become a Superior Court judge in Chatham County, Georgia.
- Lester B. Johnson III (1979): First African American male to serve as the President of the Savannah Bar Association (1996) [Chatham County, Georgia]
- Jeremy Abernathy: First African American male to serve as a municipal judge for Woodstock, Georgia (2021)
- Aaron Mason: First African American male to serve as a Judge of the Clayton County Superior Court
- Ethan Pham: First Asian American (who is of Vietnamese descent) male judge in Clayton County, Georgia (2018)
- Alvin "Al" T. Wong (1976): First Asian American male elected as a judge in DeKalb County, Georgia (1998)
- Seth Kirschenbaum: First Jewish male to serve as the President of the Atlanta Bar Association, Georgia (2001)
- J. Antonio DelCampo: First Hispanic American male to serve as a Judge of the State Court of DeKalb County in Georgia (2002)
- Mike Jacobs: First openly LGBT judge in DeKalb County, Georgia (2018)
- Dr. Franklin Goldwire: First African American male to serve as a magistrate judge of the Effingham County Magistrate Court, Georgia (2021)
- Charles "Chuck" Floyd: First African American male judge in Fayette County, Georgia (2002)
- Horace Ward (c. 1960): First African American male to serve as a Judge of the Civil Court of Fulton County (1974) and Superior Court of Fulton County (1977), Georgia
- Paul L. Howard, Jr.: First African American male elected to serve as the District Attorney of Fulton County, Georgia (1997)
- Robert D. Walker Jr. (1989): First African American male judge in Gwinnett County, Georgia
- Chung Hun Lee (1983): First Korean American male lawyer and judge in Gwinnett County, Georgia
- Deepak "DJ" Jeyaram: First South Asian male judge in Gwinnett County, Georgia (2016)
- Ramon Alvarado: First Latino American and Korean American male judge in Gwinnett County, Georgia (2019)
- Joe Diaz: First Latino American male to serve as a Judge in the Northeastern Judicial District, Georgia (2015) [Hall County, Georgia]
- Meng H. Lim (1998): First Asian American male (Cambodian American) elected as a Judge of the Superior Court of Tallapoosa Circuit (2014) [Haralson County, Georgia]
- Darius Pattillo: First African American male to serve as the District Attorney of Henry County, Alabama (2017)
- Albert Thompson: First African American male lawyer in Columbus, as well as the first African American male jurist in Muscogee County, Georgia
- Dean Carlos Bucci (1997): First Hispanic American male to serve as a Superior Court Judge of the Paulding Judicial Circuit, Georgia (2015)
- Charles Mays: First African American male probate judge in Rockdale County, Georgia
- Clarence Cuthpert, Jr.: First African American male to serve as a State Court Judge in Rockdale County, Georgia (2021)
- Robert L. Moore: First African American male to serve as the Assistant District Attorney in Thomasville, Georgia [Thomas County, Georgia]
- Larry Mims: First African American male lawyer and judge in Tift County, Georgia
- Monroe G. Worthy: First African American male to serve as a Justice of the Peace in Upson County, Georgia
- Rodney B. Weaver: First African American male to serve as a Judge of the Whitfield County Magistrate Court (2019)

== See also ==
- List of first minority male lawyers and judges in the United States

== Other topics of interest ==
- List of first women lawyers and judges in the United States
- List of first woman lawyers and judges in Georgia
