= John Land =

John Land may refer to:

- John Land (field hockey) (1938–2021), British field hockey player
- John H. Land (1920–2014), mayor of Apopka, Florida for 61 years
- John R. Land (1862–1941), Louisiana Supreme Court judge
- John C. Land III, member of the South Carolina Senate
- John Henry Land (1918–2011), American judge, lawyer, and politician in Georgia
