= John Henry Land =

American politician (1918–2011)

John Henry Land (June 12, 1918 – November 30, 2011) was an American judge, lawyer, and politician.

== Early years and education ==
John Land was born to Aaron Brewster and Mattie Miller Land on June 12, 1918, in Columbus, Georgia. He attended Muscogee County schools, graduating from Columbus High School in 1935. He then attended the University of Georgia, graduating with a law degree in 1939.

== Military service and political office ==
After a short stint in private law practice, Land was drafted into the United States Army in 1941, at the onset of World War II, rising through the ranks to the position of major. After the war, he returned to Columbus, to re-establish his private law practice. He ran, unsuccessfully, for a seat in the Georgia General Assembly in 1946, against an established legislator. Two years later, he ran unopposed for a seat in the Georgia State Senate, serving in 1949 and 1950. During his time in the state senate, Land became known as a "fierce critic" of Governor Herman Talmadge.

== Legal career ==
After his time in the legislature, Land once again returned to Columbus to take up the practice of law. When a vacancy came up for the position of district attorney, Land pursued it. But the appointment, made by Land's political rival, Governor Talmadge, went to another. Undeterred, Land sought election to the position, in 1952, but lost to the incumbent. Three years later, a new governor, Marvin Griffin appointed Land to the position of chief prosecutor. Land served as Solicitor General of the Chattahoochee Judicial System from 1955 to 1964. He then served for 24 years as Judge of the Georgia Superior Court from 1964 to 1989.

== Death and legacy ==
Land died at Columbus Hospice House in Columbus, Georgia, on November 30, 2011.

John Land was a member of a political dynasty, which included numerous city council members, state senators, and a federal judge. His nephew Ted Land served on the city council for a time, before a long career in the Georgia State Senate. Another nephew was a fixture on the city council for decades. Yet another relative, Clay Land worked his way up through the city council, before assuming the senate position previously held by is uncle Ted Land, and then advanced to the position of Chief United States district judge for the United States District Court for the Middle District of Georgia.
