= Wilbur Dawson Owens Jr. =

American judge

Senior Judge of the United States District Court for the Middle District of Georgia
- In office February 1, 1995 – April 28, 2010

Chief Judge of the United States District Court for the Middle District of Georgia
- In office 1980–1995
- Preceded by: J. Robert Elliott
- Succeeded by: Duross Fitzpatrick

Judge of the United States District Court for the Middle District of Georgia
- In office March 1, 1972 – February 1, 1995
- Appointed by: Richard Nixon
- Preceded by: William Augustus Bootle
- Succeeded by: Hugh Lawson

Personal details
- Born: Wilbur Dawson Owens Jr. February 1, 1930 Albany, Georgia, U.S.
- Died: April 28, 2010 (aged 80) Macon, Georgia, U.S.
- Education: University of Georgia School of Law (LL.B.)

Wilbur Dawson Owens Jr. (February 1, 1930 – April 28, 2010) was a United States district judge of the United States District Court for the Middle District of Georgia.

== Education and career ==
Born in Albany, Georgia, Owens received a Bachelor of Laws from the University of Georgia School of Law in 1952. He was in the United States Air Force from 1952 to 1954, continuing his service in the United States Air Force Reserve from 1954 to 1968. He was in private practice in Albany from 1954 to 1955, and was a vice president and trust officer of the Bank of Albany from 1955 to 1959. He was secretary-treasurer of the Southeastern Mortgage Company in Albany from 1959 to 1962. He was an Assistant United States Attorney for the Middle District of Georgia, stationed in Macon from 1962 to 1965, thereafter returning to private practice in Macon until 1972.

== Federal judicial service ==
On January 21, 1972, Owens was nominated by President Richard Nixon to a seat on the United States District Court for the Middle District of Georgia vacated by Judge William Augustus Bootle. Owens was confirmed by the United States Senate on February 17, 1972, and received his commission on March 1, 1972. He served as Chief Judge from 1980 to 1995. He assumed senior status on February 1, 1995, serving in that status until his death on April 28, 2010, in Macon.

== Sources ==
Legal offices
Preceded by William Augustus Bootle	Judge of the United States District Court for the Middle District of Georgia; 1972–1995	Succeeded by Hugh Lawson
Preceded by J. Robert Elliott	Chief Judge of the United States District Court for the Middle District of Georgia; 1980–1995	Succeeded by Duross Fitzpatrick
