= C. Ashley Royal =

American judge (born 1949)

Senior Judge of the United States District Court for the Middle District of Georgia
- Incumbent
- Assumed office September 1, 2016

Chief Judge of the United States District Court for the Middle District of Georgia
- In office 2009–2014
- Preceded by: Hugh Lawson
- Succeeded by: Clay D. Land

Judge of the United States District Court for the Middle District of Georgia
- In office December 21, 2001 – September 1, 2016
- Appointed by: George W. Bush
- Preceded by: Duross Fitzpatrick
- Succeeded by: Tripp Self

Assistant District Attorney of the Augusta Judicial Circuit, Georgia Superior Court
- In office 1974 – December 1975

Personal details
- Born: Charles Ashley Royal; September 14, 1949 (age 76) Augusta, Georgia, U.S.
- Spouse: Ellen Smith
- Education: University of Georgia (BA, MS, JD)

Charles Ashley Royal (born September 14, 1949) is a senior United States district judge of the United States District Court for the Middle District of Georgia.

== Education and career ==
Royal was born in Augusta, Georgia. He received an Artium Baccalaureus degree from the University of Georgia in 1971, a Juris Doctor from the University of Georgia School of Law in 1974, and a Master of Science degree from the University of Georgia in 1976. He was an assistant district attorney in the District Attorney's Office, Augusta Judicial Circuit, Georgia from 1974 to 1975. He was in private practice in Georgia in 1976, and was a public defender in Glynn County, Georgia, from 1976 to 1977, returning to private practice from 1977 to 2001.

=== Federal judicial service ===
On October 9, 2001, Royal was nominated by President George W. Bush to a seat on the United States District Court for the Middle District of Georgia vacated by Judge Duross Fitzpatrick. Royal was confirmed by the United States Senate on December 20, 2001, and received his commission on December 21, 2001. He served as chief judge from 2009 to 2014. He assumed senior status on September 1, 2016.

== Sources ==
Legal offices
Preceded by Duross Fitzpatrick	Judge of the United States District Court for the Middle District of Georgia; 2001–2016	Succeeded by Tripp Self
Preceded by Hugh Lawson	Chief Judge of the United States District Court for the Middle District of Georgia; 2009–2014	Succeeded by Clay D. Land
