= Thomas Hoyt Davis =

American judge

Senior Judge of the United States District Court for the Middle District of Georgia
- In office June 30, 1961 – May 19, 1969

Chief Judge of the United States District Court for the Middle District of Georgia
- In office 1949–1961
- Preceded by: Office established
- Succeeded by: William Augustus Bootle

Judge of the United States District Court for the Middle District of Georgia
- In office January 30, 1945 – June 30, 1961
- Appointed by: Franklin D. Roosevelt
- Preceded by: Bascom Sine Deaver
- Succeeded by: J. Robert Elliott

Personal details
- Born: Thomas Hoyt Davis; July 4, 1892 Braselton, Georgia, US
- Died: May 19, 1969 (aged 76)
- Resting place: Vienna, Georgia, US
- Education: Mercer University (A.B.) read law

Thomas Hoyt Davis (July 4, 1892 – May 19, 1969) was a United States district judge of the United States District Court for the Middle District of Georgia.

== Education and career ==
Born in Braselton, Georgia, Davis received an Artium Baccalaureus degree from Mercer University in 1913 and read law to enter the bar in 1916. He was in private practice in Georgia from 1916 to 1926. He was a state solicitor general of the Cordele Judicial Circuit in Georgia from 1927 to 1933. He was the United States Attorney for the Middle District of Georgia from 1933 to 1945.

== Federal judicial service ==
On January 3, 1945, Davis was nominated by President Franklin D. Roosevelt to a seat on the United States District Court for the Middle District of Georgia vacated by Judge Bascom Sine Deaver. Davis was confirmed by the United States Senate on January 29, 1945, and received his commission on January 30, 1945. He served as Chief Judge from 1949 to 1961, assuming senior status on June 30, 1961, and serving in that capacity until his death on May 19, 1969.

== Sources ==
Legal offices
Preceded by Bascom Sine Deaver	Judge of the United States District Court for the Middle District of Georgia; 1945–1961	Succeeded by J. Robert Elliott
Preceded by Office established	Chief Judge of the United States District Court for the Middle District of Georgia; 1949–1961	Succeeded by William Augustus Bootle
