= Bascom Deaver =

Bascom Deaver may refer to:

- Bascom Sine Deaver (1882–1944), American judge
- Bascom S. Deaver (born 1930), American physicist
