= Hugh Lawson (judge) =

American judge (1941–2024)

Senior Judge of the United States District Court for the Middle District of Georgia
- In office December 31, 2008 – March 29, 2024

Chief Judge of the United States District Court for the Middle District of Georgia
- In office 2006–2008
- Preceded by: William Augustus Bootle
- Succeeded by: C. Ashley Royal

Judge of the United States District Court for the Middle District of Georgia
- In office December 26, 1995 – December 31, 2008
- Appointed by: Bill Clinton
- Preceded by: Wilbur Dawson Owens Jr.
- Succeeded by: Marc T. Treadwell

Judge of the Superior Court of Georgia, Oconee Judicial Circuit
- In office August 2, 1979 – December 26, 1995

Member of the Georgia World Congress Center Authority
- In office 1976–1979
- Appointed by: George Busbee

Member of the Georgia Board of Industry and Trade
- In office 1975–1979
- Appointed by: Jimmy Carter

Member of the Board of Education of Pulaski County, Georgia
- In office 1975–1978
- Appointed by: Pulaski County, Georgia

Personal details
- Born: Roger Hugh Lawson, Jr. September 23, 1941 Hawkinsville, Georgia, U.S.
- Died: March 29, 2024 (aged 82)
- Spouse: Barbara Boots
- Education: Emory University (BA, JD)

Roger Hugh Lawson Jr. (September 23, 1941 – March 29, 2024) was a United States district judge of the United States District Court for the Middle District of Georgia.

== Education and career ==
Born in Hawkinsville, Georgia, in 1941, Lawson received a Bachelor of Arts degree from Emory University in 1963 and a Juris Doctor from Emory University School of Law in 1964. He was in private practice in Hawkinsville from 1965 to 1979. He was a judge of the Superior Court of Georgia, Oconee Judicial Circuit of Georgia from 1979 to 1995.

== Federal judicial service ==
On August 10, 1995, Lawson was nominated by President Bill Clinton to a seat on the United States District Court for the Middle District of Georgia vacated by Wilbur D. Owens, Jr. Lawson was confirmed by the United States Senate on December 22, 1995, and received his commission on December 26, 1995. He served as chief judge from 2006 to 2008, assuming senior status on December 31, 2008. Lawson died on March 29, 2024, at the age of 82.

Legal offices
| Preceded by Wilbur Dawson Owens, Jr. | Judge of the United States District Court for the Middle District of Georgia; 1995–2008 | Succeeded by Marc T. Treadwell |
| Preceded by William Augustus Bootle | Chief Judge of the United States District Court for the Middle District of Georgia; 2006–2008 | Succeeded by C. Ashley Royal |
