= Tripp Self =

American judge (born 1968)

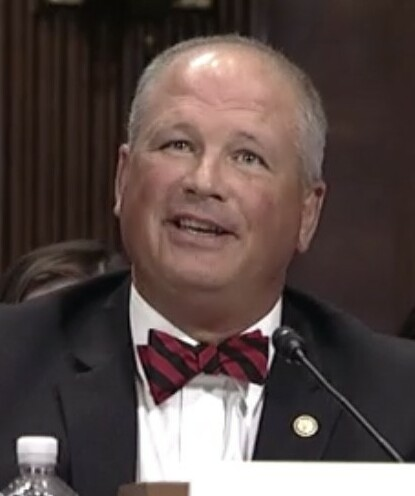

Judge of the United States District Court for the Middle District of Georgia
- Incumbent
- Assumed office March 7, 2018
- Appointed by: Donald Trump
- Preceded by: C. Ashley Royal

Judge of the Georgia Court of Appeals
- In office January 1, 2017 – March 7, 2018
- Appointed by: Nathan Deal
- Preceded by: Michael P. Boggs
- Succeeded by: E. Trenton Brown III

Chief Judge of the Georgia Superior Court for the Macon Judicial Circuit
- In office January 1, 2014 – January 1, 2017
- Preceded by: S. Phillip Brown
- Succeeded by: Ed Ennis

Judge of the Georgia Superior Court for the Macon Judicial Circuit
- In office January 1, 2007 – January 1, 2017
- Preceded by: Tommy Day Wilcox
- Succeeded by: David L. Mincey III

Personal details
- Born: Tilman Eugene Self III; 1968 (age 57–58) Macon, Georgia, U.S.
- Party: Republican
- Education: The Citadel (BSBA); University of Georgia (JD)

Military service
- Allegiance: United States
- Branch/service: United States Army
- Years of service: 1990–1994
- Rank: First Lieutenant
- Battles/wars: Korean Demilitarized Zone (1991–1992)
- Awards: See list: Army Commendation Medal (with Bronze Oak Leaf Cluster) Army Achievement Medal (with Bronze Oak Leaf Cluster) Army Overseas Service Ribbon National Defense Service Medal Army Service Ribbon

Tilman Eugene "Tripp" Self III (born 1968) is a United States district judge of the United States District Court for the Middle District of Georgia and a former Judge of the Georgia Court of Appeals.

== Education and career ==
Born in 1968, Self received a Bachelor of Science in Business Administration degree in 1990 from The Citadel, graduating 9th out of his class of 516. He served four years as a Field Artillery Officer in the United States Army. He received a Juris Doctor in 1997 from the University of Georgia School of Law. In the summer of 1990 he was a laborer for his father's construction business and in 1996 he was a research assistant to professor Ronald D. Carlson at the University of Georgia School of Law. He engaged in the private practice of law for nine years at the Macon, Georgia law firm of Sell & Melton, LLP. Self was elected to the Macon County Superior Court from Macon in 2006, beginning service on January 1, 2007, and winning re-election in 2010 and 2014. He was chief judge from January 1, 2014, to January 1, 2017, with his tenure running from the retirement of his predecessor, S. Phillip Brown, to his elevation. On November 9, 2016, Georgia Governor Nathan Deal appointed Self to the Georgia Court of Appeals to the seat vacated by Michael P. Boggs, with his term beginning January 1, 2017. David L. Mincey III succeeded him, by appointment, on the Superior Court bench. He became the 83rd judge of the Court of Appeals and ended his tenure on the state bench after being confirmed to the United States District Court for the Middle District of Georgia.

== Federal judicial service ==
On July 13, 2017, President Donald Trump nominated Self to serve as a United States District Judge of the United States District Court for the Middle District of Georgia, to the seat vacated by Judge C. Ashley Royal, who assumed senior status on September 1, 2016. On October 4, 2017, a hearing on his nomination was held before the Senate Judiciary Committee. On October 26, 2017, his nomination was reported out of committee by a voice vote. On March 1, 2018, the United States Senate invoked cloture on his nomination by an 85–12 vote. On March 5, 2018, his nomination was confirmed by an 85–11 vote. He received his commission on March 7, 2018.

== Notable cases ==
In February 2022, Self issued an injunction forbidding the Air Force from requiring an officer to be vaccinated against COVID-19, as against her religious objections. Responding to the Air Force's argument that vaccinations were necessary to promote military readiness, Self questioned the efficacy of the COVID vaccine, asking whether "a COVID-19 vaccine really provides more sufficient protection [than "natural immunity"]?"

== Memberships ==
He has been a member of the Federalist Society since 2008.

Legal offices
Preceded by Tommy Day Wilcox	Judge of the Georgia Superior Court for the Macon Judicial Circuit; 2007–2017	Succeeded by David L. Mincey, III
Preceded by S. Phillip Brown	Chief Judge of the Georgia Superior Court for the Macon Judicial Circuit; 2014–2017	Succeeded by Ed Ennis
Preceded by Michael P. Boggs	Judge of the Georgia Court of Appeals; 2017–2018	Succeeded by E. Trenton Brown III
Preceded by C. Ashley Royal	Judge of the United States District Court for the Middle District of Georgia; 2018–present	Incumbent
