= Duross Fitzpatrick =

American judge

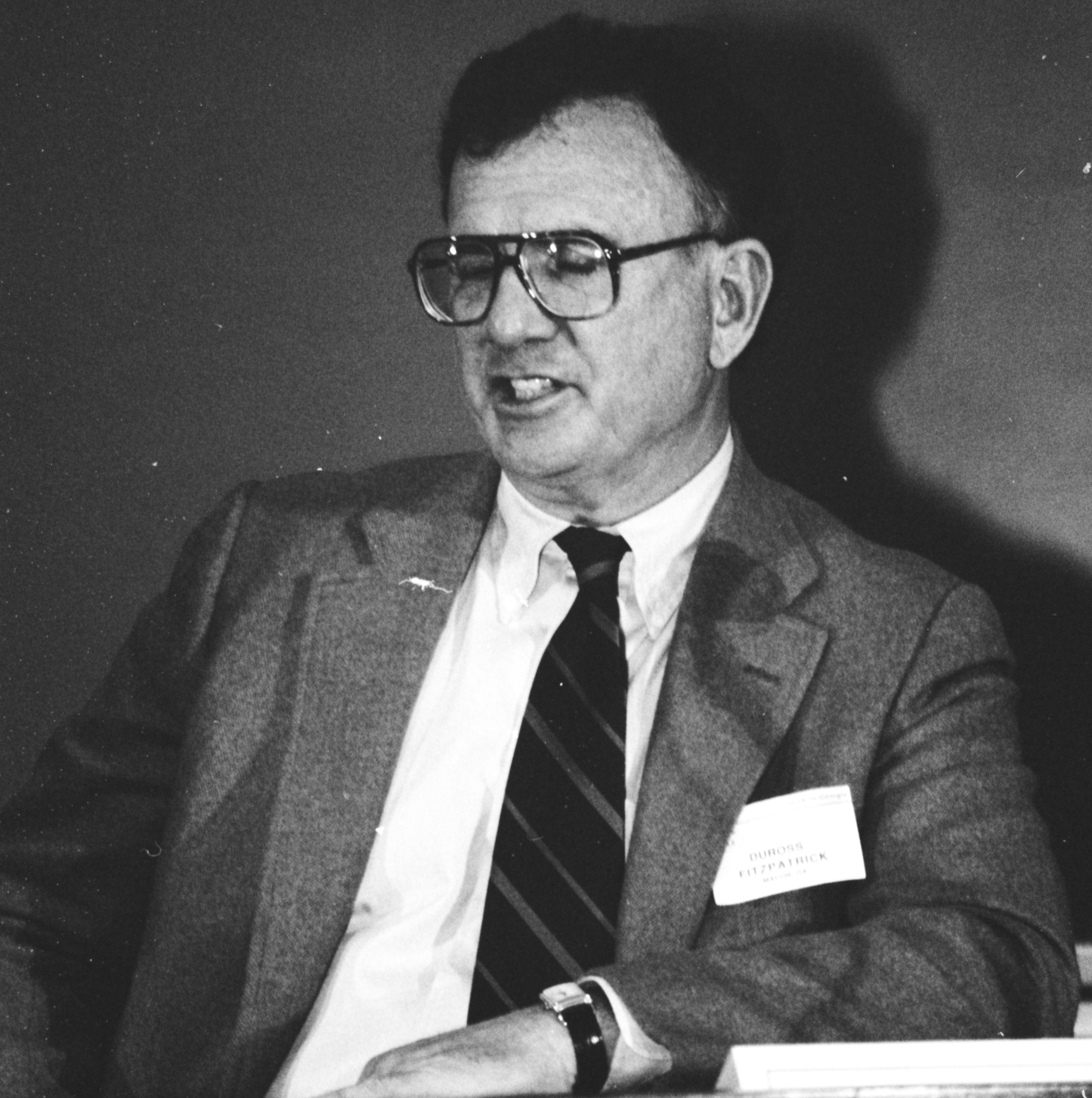
- Fitzpatrick in 1992

Senior Judge of the United States District Court for the Middle District of Georgia
- In office February 1, 2001 – January 6, 2008

Chief Judge of the United States District Court for the Middle District of Georgia
- In office 1995–2001
- Preceded by: Wilbur Dawson Owens Jr.
- Succeeded by: Willie Louis Sands

Judge of the United States District Court for the Middle District of Georgia
- In office December 17, 1985 – February 1, 2001
- Appointed by: Ronald Reagan
- Preceded by: Seat established by 98 Stat. 333
- Succeeded by: C. Ashley Royal

Personal details
- Born: October 19, 1934 Macon, Georgia, U.S.
- Died: January 6, 2008 (aged 73) Jeffersonville, Georgia, U.S.
- Spouse: Beverly O'Connor (m. 1963)
- Children: 2
- Parents: Mark W. Fitzpatrick (father); Jane L. Duross (mother)
- Education: University of Georgia (B.S.F.); University of Georgia School of Law (LL.B.)

John Duross Fitzpatrick (October 19, 1934 – January 6, 2008) was an American lawyer and jurist who served as United States district judge of the United States District Court for the Middle District of Georgia.

== Education and career ==
Fitzpatrick was born in Macon, Georgia, the son of Mark W. and Jane L. (née Duross) Fitzpatrick. He attended high school in Cochran, Georgia, and then Sewanee: The University of the South before serving in the United States Marine Corps from 1954 to 1957. Thereafter, he received a Bachelor of Science in Finance from the University of Georgia in 1961 and a Bachelor of Laws from the University of Georgia School of Law in 1966. He was in private practice in Macon from 1966 to 1967, and then in Cochran until 1986. He married Beverly O'Connor on March 17, 1963, and they would have two sons.

== Federal judicial service ==
On November 14, 1985, Fitzpatrick was nominated by President Ronald Reagan to a new seat on the United States District Court for the Middle District of Georgia, created by 98 Stat. 333. He was confirmed by the United States Senate on December 16, 1985, and received his commission on December 17, 1985. He served as Chief Judge from 1995 to 2001, assuming senior status on February 1, 2001, and serving in that capacity until his death, in Jeffersonville, Georgia.

== Sources ==
Legal offices
Preceded by Seat established by 98 Stat. 333	Judge of the United States District Court for the Middle District of Georgia; 1985–2001	Succeeded by C. Ashley Royal
Preceded by Wilbur Dawson Owens Jr.	Chief Judge of the United States District Court for the Middle District of Georgia; 1995–2001	Succeeded by Willie Louis Sands
