= Peter B. Rutledge =

American attorney

Peter Bowman "Bo" Rutledge is an American legal scholar. He is the Herman E. Talmadge Chair of Law and a former dean of the University of Georgia School of Law. He is a specialist in international business transactions, international dispute resolution, litigation, arbitration, and the U.S. Supreme Court.

== Professional career ==
Rutledge graduated from Harvard University with a bachelor's degree, magna cum laude, and earned an M.Litt. in applied ethics from the University of Aberdeen on a Rotary International scholarship. He then earned his J.D. degree with high honors from the University of Chicago Law School, where he was executive editor of the University of Chicago Law Review and inducted into the Order of the Coif. He served as a law clerk for Judge J. Harvie Wilkinson III of the United States Court of Appeals for the Fourth Circuit in 1997. He then clerked for Justice Clarence Thomas at the U.S. Supreme Court.

Rutledge practiced law as an attorney at Wilmer Cutler Pickering Hale and Dorr and Freshfields Bruckhaus Deringer. He has filed more than 70 briefs and petitions in the Supreme Court of the United States and in other federal appellate courts and state supreme courts for corporations, industry associations, and individuals. In 2008, the United States Supreme Court appointed Rutledge as amicus curiae to brief and argue the case before the U. S. Supreme Court of Irrizary v. United States. He subsequently won the case, joining the ranks of a select few advocates who have successfully defended a judgment below when the government refused to do so. He also joined the John McCain's 2008 presidential campaign as a judicial advisory committee member.

== Teaching career ==
In 2003, Rutledge accepted a teaching position as an associate professor of law at the Columbus School of Law at The Catholic University of America, and was chosen as Professor of the Year for four consecutive years. In 2008, he accepted a position as a tenured associate professor of law at the University of Georgia School of Law. There, he has won numerous teaching and service awards and honors. He served as the law school's Associate Dean for Faculty Development from 2013-2014, and was its Dean from January 1, 2015 to December 31, 2024. Rutledge teaches Civil Procedure, International Business Transactions and International Litigation and Arbitration. He has lectured at universities such as Oxford University and Cambridge University as well as teaching as a Fulbright Professor at the Institut für Zivilverfahrensrecht. Besides his teaching and writing, Rutledge is sought for legal advice and expertise on matters such as litigation, arbitration, the U.S. Supreme Court and international dispute resolution including appearing as an expert witness in both litigation and arbitration, and multiple times testifying before the U.S. Congress on pending legislation.

== Examples of published works ==
Born, Gary and Peter B. Rutledge. (1st published 2006) (4th, 5th, 6th & 7th eds.). International Civil Litigation in United States Courts. Aspen Publishers. ISBN 0-7355-6307-1

Peter B. Rutledge. (2012). Arbitration and the Constitution. Cambridge University Press. ISBN 1107006112

Additionally, Rutledge has been published by several publishers including, without limitation, the Oxford University Press, the Yale University Press and the Cambridge University Press, and has had articles appear in several journals and law reviews such as University of Chicago Law Review, Vanderbilt Law Review and Journal of International Arbitration, for a total of more than 40 authorships.

In 2008, Rutledge published a paper on behalf of the U.S. Chamber Institute for Legal Reform disputing the premise of a report by Public Citizen. The Public Citizen report said that private arbitration lacked necessary safeguards to protect consumers and that consumers lost 94 percent of cases (mostly involving debt collection) adjudicated by arbitration firm National Arbitration Forum.

Finally, Rutledge has performed peer-review work for publications such as the Stanford Law Review, the Oxford University Press, and others, and has conducted workshops and given speeches for such organizations as the Columbia Law School, University of Georgia School of Law, New York University School of Law, University of Virginia School of Law, Vanderbilt University Law School, London School of Economics, Faculty of Law, University of Oxford, Washington University School of Law, American Bar Association, City University of Hong Kong School of Law and many others.

== See also ==
- List of law clerks for the tenth seat of the Supreme Court of the United States
