= Leslie Abrams Gardner =

American judge (born 1974)

Leslie Gardner
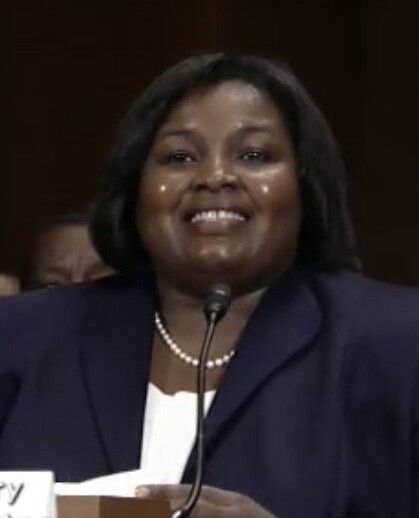
- Gardner in 2014

Chief Judge of the United States District Court for the Middle District of Georgia
- Incumbent
- Assumed office June 1, 2024
- Preceded by: Marc T. Treadwell

Judge of the United States District Court for the Middle District of Georgia
- Incumbent
- Assumed office November 20, 2014
- Appointed by: Barack Obama
- Preceded by: Willie Louis Sands

Personal details
- Born: Leslie Joyce Abrams; December 6, 1974 (age 51) Madison, Wisconsin, U.S.
- Spouse: Jimmie Gardner (m. 2018)
- Relatives: Stacey Abrams (sister)
- Education: Brown University (BA); Yale University (JD)

Leslie Abrams Gardner (née Leslie Joyce Abrams; born December 6, 1974) is the chief United States district judge of the United States District Court for the Middle District of Georgia. Prior to being appointed to the bench, she was an assistant United States attorney.

== Biography ==
Gardner is the daughter of the Reverend Carolyn and the Reverend Robert Abrams, originally of Hattiesburg, Mississippi. She was one of six children. Her older sister Stacey Abrams is the former House Minority Leader in the Georgia General Assembly.

Gardner received a Bachelor of Arts degree in 1997 from Brown University. She received a Juris Doctor in 2002 from Yale Law School. She began her career serving as a law clerk for Judge Marvin J. Garbis of the United States District Court for the District of Maryland. She served as an associate at the law firm of Skadden, Arps, Slate, Meagher & Flom LLP, from 2003 to 2006 and again from 2007 to 2010. She served as an associate at the law firm of Kilpatrick Townsend & Stockton, from 2006 to 2007. From 2010 to 2014, she served as an assistant U.S. attorney in the Northern District of Georgia.

Gardner married her husband, Jimmie Gardner, in 2018; he had been exonerated two years prior for spending more than 25 years in prison for accusations of sexual assault. In November 2023, the Tampa Police Department released a statement stating her husband had been arrested on allegations of human trafficking.

=== Federal judicial service ===
On March 11, 2014, President Barack Obama nominated Gardner to serve as a United States district judge for the United States District Court for the Middle District of Georgia, to the seat being vacated by Judge Willie Louis Sands, who subsequently assumed senior status on April 12, 2014. She received a hearing before the Senate Judiciary Committee on May 13, 2014. On June 19, 2014, her nomination was reported out of committee by voice vote. On November 12, 2014, Senate Majority Leader Harry Reid filed for cloture on her nomination. On November 17, 2014, the United States Senate invoked cloture on her nomination by a 68–28 vote. On November 18, 2014, her nomination was confirmed by a 100–0 vote. She received her judicial commission on November 20, 2014. Gardner became the first African-American woman federal judge to serve on a federal district court in Georgia. She became chief judge on June 1, 2024.

In May 2024, NPR revealed that Gardner had received free travel in 2022 to the Sage Lodge Colloquium, a privately funded legal seminar hosted at a resort in Montana's Paradise Valley, but had failed to disclose this on her required annual financial disclosure report for that year, in violation of federal law. In response, court clerk David Bunt told NPR that the financial disclosures were incomplete due to an "oversight" and that Gardner was updating her disclosure reports.

== See also ==
- Joe Biden Supreme Court candidates
- List of African-American federal judges
- List of African-American jurists

Legal offices
Preceded by Willie Louis Sands	Judge of the United States District Court for the Middle District of Georgia; 2014–present	Incumbent
Preceded by Marc T. Treadwell	Chief Judge of the United States District Court for the Middle District of Georgia; 2024–present	Incumbent
