= Marc T. Treadwell =

American judge (born 1955)

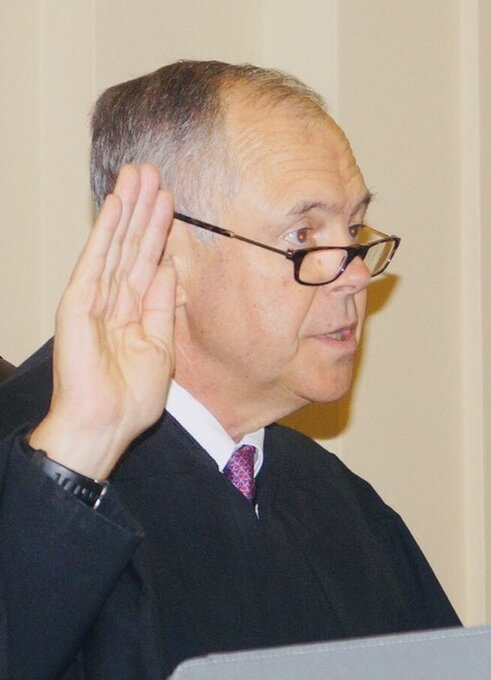
- Treadwell in 2019

Chief Judge of the United States District Court for the Middle District of Georgia
- In office July 1, 2020 – May 31, 2024
- Preceded by: Clay D. Land
- Succeeded by: Leslie Abrams Gardner

Judge of the United States District Court for the Middle District of Georgia
- Incumbent
- Assumed office June 22, 2010
- Appointed by: Barack Obama
- Preceded by: Hugh Lawson

Personal details
- Born: Marc Thomas Treadwell; August 6, 1955 (age 70) Fort Campbell, Kentucky, U.S.
- Education: Valdosta State University (BA); Mercer University (JD)

Marc Thomas Treadwell (born August 6, 1955) is a United States district judge of the United States District Court for the Middle District of Georgia.

== Early life and education ==
Treadwell was born in Fort Campbell, Kentucky in 1955 and graduated from Blackshear High School in 1973. He earned a Bachelor of Arts degree in 1978 from Valdosta State University and a Juris Doctor in 1981 from the Walter F. George School of Law at Mercer University.

== Career ==
From 1981 to 1985, Treadwell served as an associate for the Atlanta law firm of Kilpatrick & Cody (now Kilpatrick Stockton). He then served as an associate for the Macon, Georgia law firm Chambless, Higdon & Carson LLP from 1985 until 1987 and then as a partner with that firm from 1987 until 2000. From 2000 until 2010, Treadwell was a partner in the Macon, Georgia firm Adams, Jordan & Treadwell, where he specialized in personal injury and wrongful death. He also has been an adjunct professor at his alma mater, the Walter F. George School of Law at Mercer University, since 1998.

=== Federal judicial service ===
On February 4, 2010, President Barack Obama nominated Treadwell to serve on the United States District Court for the Middle District of Georgia, to fill the vacancy created by Judge Hugh Lawson, who assumed senior status at the end of 2008. On March 18, 2010, the United States Senate Committee on the Judiciary reported Treadwell's nomination out of committee by a voice vote. The United States Senate confirmed Treadwell on June 21, 2010 by an 89–0 vote. He received his commission on June 22, 2010. He served as Chief Judge from July 1, 2020 to May 31, 2024.

Legal offices
Preceded by Hugh Lawson	Judge of the United States District Court for the Middle District of Georgia; 2010–present	Incumbent
Preceded by Clay D. Land	Chief Judge of the United States District Court for the Middle District of Georgia; 2020–2024	Succeeded by Leslie Abrams Gardner
