= J. Robert Elliott =

American judge

Chief Judge of the United States District Court for the Middle District of Georgia
- In office 1972–1980
- Preceded by: William Augustus Bootle
- Succeeded by: Wilbur Dawson Owens Jr.

Judge of the United States District Court for the Middle District of Georgia
- In office February 17, 1962 – December 31, 2000
- Appointed by: John F. Kennedy
- Preceded by: Thomas Hoyt Davis
- Succeeded by: Clay D. Land

Personal details
- Born: James Robert Elliott; January 1, 1910 Gainesville, Georgia, U.S.
- Died: June 27, 2006 (aged 96) Columbus, Georgia, U.S.
- Resting place: Columbus, Georgia
- Party: Democratic
- Education: Emory University (Ph.B.); Emory University School of Law (LL.B.)

James Robert Elliott (January 1, 1910 – June 27, 2006) was a United States district judge of the United States District Court for the Middle District of Georgia.

== Education and career ==
Born in Gainesville, Georgia, to Thomas M. Elliott, a Methodist minister, and Mamie Glenn Elliot, Elliott received a Bachelor of Philosophy degree from Emory University in 1930. He taught school to earn money for his legal education. He received a Bachelor of Laws from Emory University School of Law in 1934. He entered private practice of law in Columbus, Georgia from 1934 to 1943. He was a member of the Georgia House of Representatives from 1937 to 1943. He was in the United States Navy as a Lieutenant from 1943 to 1946, serving in the Pacific. He returned to private practice in Columbus from 1946 to 1962. He was again a member of the Georgia House of Representatives from 1947 to 1949, where he served as a floor leader for Herman Talmadge in the three governors controversy. He was also a delegate to the Democratic National Convention in 1948 and 1952.

== Federal judicial service ==
Elliott was nominated by President John F. Kennedy on January 23, 1962, to a seat on the United States District Court for the Middle District of Georgia vacated by Judge Thomas Hoyt Davis. He was confirmed by the United States Senate on February 7, 1962, and received his commission on February 17, 1962. He served as Chief Judge from 1972 to 1980. His service was terminated on December 31, 2000, due to his retirement; he did not take senior status. He was the last federal court judge in active service to have been appointed to his position by President Kennedy. (Note: Reynaldo Guerra Garza, appointed by Kennedy to the Southern District of Texas, would be appointed by Jimmy Carter to the Fifth Circuit in 1979 and remain in active service until his death on September 14, 2004, nearly four years after Elliott retired.) He died on June 27, 2006, in Columbus, where he is buried.

=== Notable cases ===
In his first year on the bench, Elliott issued an order halting a civil rights demonstration led by the Martin Luther King Jr. in Albany, Georgia. He later said that the decision – subsequently overturned on appeal – was made due to a threat of violence against King and his supporters. Nevertheless, King biographer Taylor Branch wrote that Judge Elliott was a "strident segregationist." In 1983, The American Lawyer would rank Elliott as the worst federal judge in the newly created Eleventh Circuit, describing him as:

an old-line segregationist who flaunts his deep-rooted prejudices against blacks, unions, and criminal defendants

In 1974, Elliott gained notoriety for overturning the conviction of the war criminal Army Lt. William Calley for killing 22 people during the 1968 My Lai massacre, a decision later overruled by the appeals court.

In 1996 and 1997, Elliott was reprimanded by the United States Court of Appeals for the Eleventh Circuit for his evidentiary rulings in cases involving DuPont and Mazda. Elliott had fined DuPont $115 million for withholding evidence in a suit over Benlate fungicide, and had ruled that Mazda forfeited the right to trial when it failed to comply with his order to turn evidence over to the plaintiffs. The 11th Circuit reversed both rulings, and in the Mazda case found that Elliott had abused his power and "effectively abdicat[ed his] responsibility to manage a case."

== Notes ==
Legal offices
Preceded by Thomas Hoyt Davis	Judge of the United States District Court for the Middle District of Georgia; 1962–2000	Succeeded by Clay D. Land
Preceded by William Augustus Bootle	Chief Judge of the United States District Court for the Middle District of Georgia; 1972–1980	Succeeded by Wilbur Dawson Owens Jr.
