= William Augustus Bootle Federal Building and United States Courthouse =

Historic courthouse in Macon, Georgia, US

- Old U.S. Post Office and Federal Building
- U.S. National Register of Historic Places
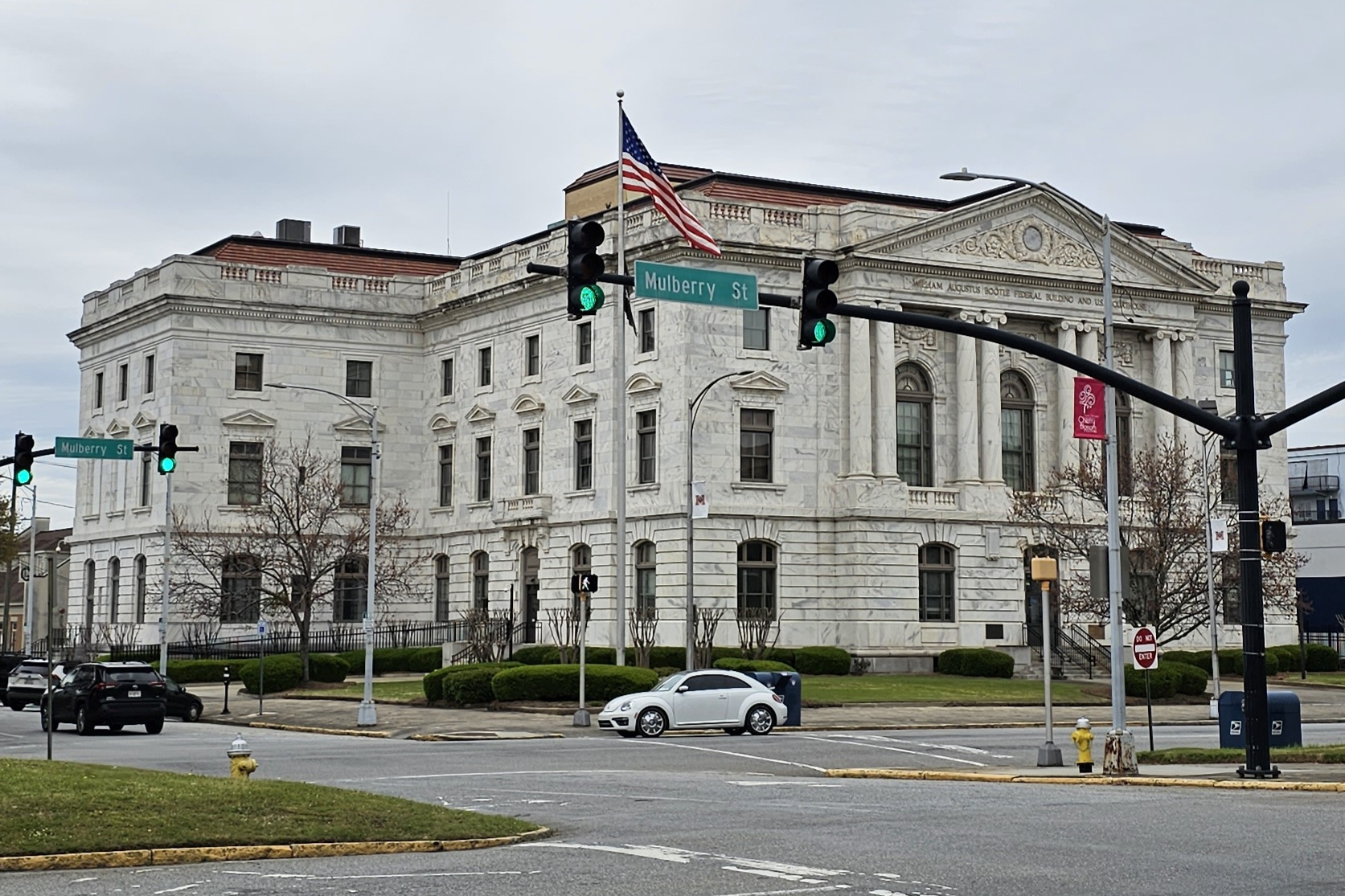
- The building in 2023

- Location within Georgia Location within the United States
- Location: 475 Mulberry St., Macon, Georgia
- Coordinates: 32°50′13″N 83°37′32″W
- Area: 1 acre (0.40 ha)
- Built: 1908
- Built by: Mankin Construction Co.
- Architect: Taylor, James Knox
- Architectural style: Classical Revival
- NRHP reference No.: 72000370
- Added to NRHP: January 20, 1972

The William Augustus Bootle Federal Building and U.S. Courthouse, also and formerly known as Old U.S. Post Office and Federal Building, is a courthouse in Macon, Georgia of the United States District Court for the Middle District of Georgia. Completed in 1908, it initially served as a courthouse of the United States District Court for the Southern District of Georgia, until the creation of the Middle District in 1926. It was individually listed on the National Register of Historic Places (NRHP) in 1972 as "Old U.S. Post Office and Federal Building", and also is included in the NRHP-listed Macon Historic District. It was renamed in honor of district court judge William Augustus Bootle in 1998.

== Building history ==
In 1896, the rapidly growing city of Macon, Georgia, needed a larger post office and courthouse. After much debate, officials decided to construct a new building rather than expand an existing federal courthouse. However, Judge Emory Speer refused to vacate that building, insisting that only an addition was necessary and major construction would disrupt the court. Speer resisted for years, but the original building was finally demolished in 1906.

James Knox Taylor, Supervising Architect of the U.S. Treasury Department, designed the new building in the Beaux Arts Classicism style, which he believed conveyed the dignity of the Federal government. By September 1908, the building was completed. The post office occupied the first floor, and courtrooms and judges' chambers were on the second floor.

The building was renamed the William Augustus Bootle Federal Building and U.S. Courthouse in 1998 to honor one of Georgia's most important judges who presided there. President Dwight Eisenhower appointed Judge Bootle to the U.S. District Court for the Middle District of Georgia in 1954. Judge Bootle was responsible for several landmark civil rights rulings in the state. In 1961, he ordered the University of Georgia to admit two African-American students, Hamilton Holmes and Charlayne Hunter, who were denied admission because of race. The case, Holmes v. Danner, had a major impact on integrating higher education in Georgia. Judge Bootle issued his ruling on Friday, January 6, 1961, and called for immediate action. Holmes and Hunter registered the following Monday and attended classes two days later. A related ruling by Judge Bootle denied Governor Ernest Vandiver the ability to refuse state funding to the university if it was integrated. Judge Bootle also ordered the desegregation of the Macon bus system in 1962 and Bibb County public schools in 1970. After a distinguished career, Judge Bootle died in early 2005.

The building was listed in the National Register of Historic Places in 1972 and is within the boundaries of the National Register of Historic Places Macon Historic District, which was listed in 1974.

== Architecture ==
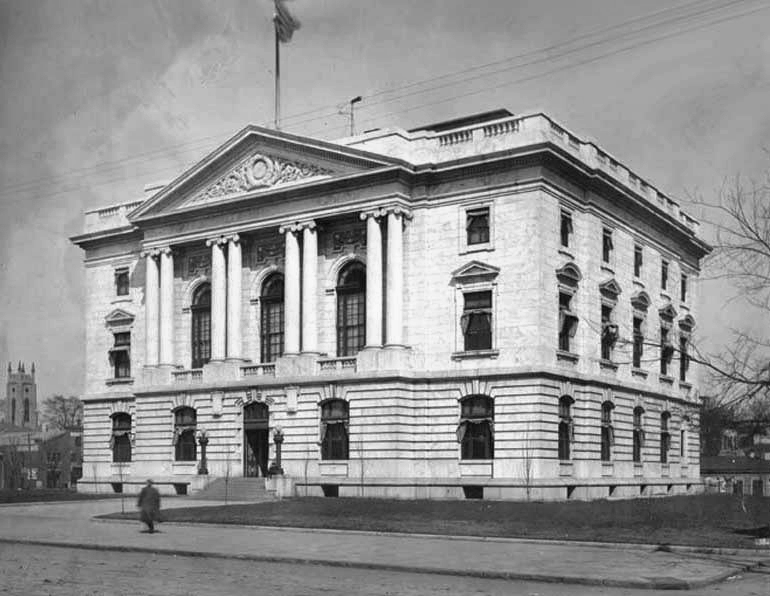
The building in 1908

The building displays many characteristics of the Beaux Arts Classicism style of architecture. Architect James Knox Taylor was responsible for the construction of many classically inspired buildings during his Federal career. Taylor believed that classical architecture espoused the symbolic value of Federal buildings as lasting monuments to the ideals of democracy. The building contains many character-defining features such as the central pavilion with a pediment (triangular gable), monumental paired columns, balustrades, and decorative swags and garlands. The rusticated first story features deep horizontal grooves between the marble blocks.

The facade is clad in white marble on the front and side elevations, but cream-colored glazed brick is on the rear portion. The building sits on a raised granite base. Above the rusticated first floor, the marble is laid without recessed joints, resulting in a smooth finish. A dentil course of small blocks extends across the facade and is another classical feature.

Fenestration includes rectangular windows topped with marble pediments and arched windows with prominent keystones. Three large windows on the second story are each topped with fanlights. Plaques with swag designs are located above the keystones.

The original portion of the building had a U-shaped plan with an open light court that provided illumination to interior spaces. In 1917, a wing was added to the rear of the building. The addition respected the original design and used similar materials, but was less ornamental than the original facade. In 1934, a second addition was completed, providing another courtroom and more office space. Both were constructed under the auspices of the Supervising Architect's office.

The lobby is divided into two areas: a postal lobby in the original portion of the building and a public lobby that is part of the 1934 addition. In the postal lobby, verde (green) marble pilasters (attached columns) with scrolled Ionic capitals decorate the walls. The floors are terrazzo with brass dividers and verde marble borders. The same marble is used for the wainscot. Heavily veined white marble veneer covers the upper portions of the walls. The ornate ceiling is executed in plaster and features beams that divide the ceiling into distinct panels. Each panel is outlined with a dentil course and egg-and-dart decorative molding. A decorative band called a guilloche with floral patterns also defines each panel. The centers each have a plaster medallion outlined with an acanthus leaf design. Cylindrical brass light fixtures descend from the centers of the panels. Original octagonal postal tables that sit upon verde marble bases remain in the lobby. Decorative finishes and details in the public lobby are similar to those in the postal lobby and provide continuity to the interior. However, ceiling panels in the public lobby are less ornate.

The main staircase ascends from the first floor. Its newel posts and baluster are cast iron with a wood railing, and treads are white marble. Elevators have been replaced, but the exterior finishes are original and include doors with brass panels and verde marble surrounds.

The second floor contains the ceremonial courtroom. Oak wainscot covers the walls and an ornamental cornice encompasses the top of the room. Original furnishings in the room include the judge's bench, witness box, clerk's desk, court rail and benches, and jury box. Original lighting fixtures illuminate the powder-blue and white vaulted ceiling.

== Significant events ==
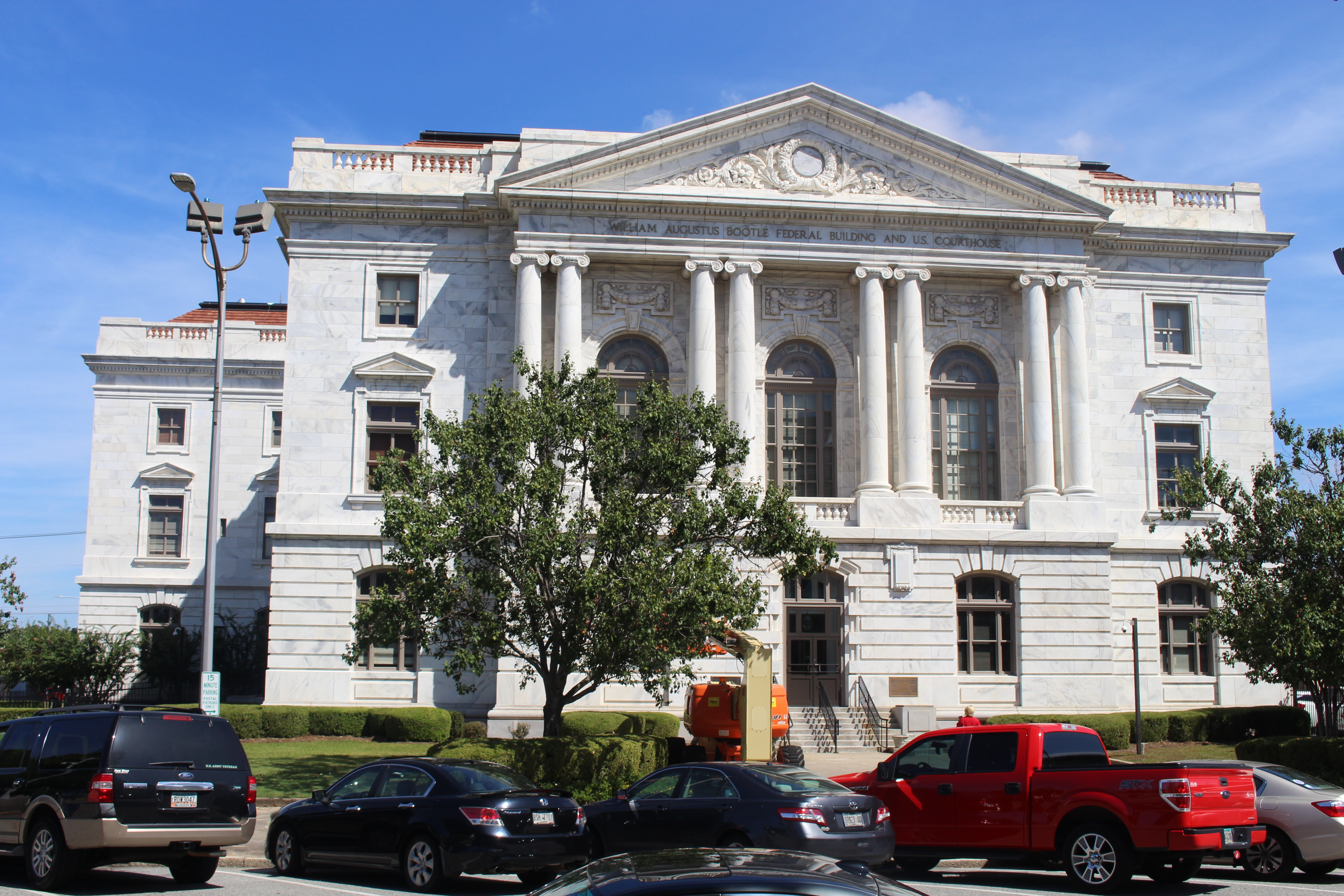
The building in 2018

- Construction Dates: 1905–1908
- 1906: Old building demolished after lengthy delay
- 1908: New building completed
- 1917: First addition completed
- 1934: Second addition completed
- 1961–1970: Landmark civil rights rulings by Judge Bootle
- 1972: Building listed in the National Register of Historic Places
- 1974: Macon Historic District listed in the National Register of Historic Places
- 1998: Building renamed to honor Judge William Augustus Bootle

== Building facts ==
- Architectural style: Beaux Arts Classicism
- Primary material: white marble
- Prominent features: central pavilion with pediment first-floor lobbies; second-floor courtroom

== See also ==
- List of United States post offices
