= Ted J. Land =

American politician

Member of the Georgia State Senate from the 16th district
- In office 1979–1991
- Preceded by: H. Norwood Pearce
- Succeeded by: Pete Robinson

Personal details
- Born: August 22, 1936 Miami, Florida
- Died: March 31, 2018 (aged 81) Columbus, Georgia
- Party: Republican
- Children: Debra Taylor, Douglas Land, and Donna Land
- Education: University of Georgia
- Profession: Real estate

Theodore Joseph Land (August 22, 1936 – March 31, 2018) was an American businessman and politician.

== Biography ==
=== Early years ===
Ted J. Land was born on August 22, 1936, in Miami, Florida. The Lands subsequently moved to Columbus, Georgia, around 1950, where they had strong family ties. Ted served two years in the Navy after High School graduation. He then attended the University of Georgia, where he graduated fifth in his class in 1962. Following college graduation, Land worked as a marketing executive at Royal Crown Cola for over 10 years. While he owned a variety of businesses over the years, he eventually concentrated on real estate sales. Known as a hard worker and someone who loved making deals, he sold over 100 homes.

=== Political career ===
Senator Land served six terms (12 years) in the Georgia General Assembly and two and a half years in his local City Council. From 1979 until 1991, Land served as a Republican member of the Georgia State Senate representing Marion, Talbot, and portions of Muscogee counties. He sat on the Appropriations, Insurance, and Transportation committees, and served as Vice-Chairman of the powerful Rules committee. In his first election to the Georgia Senate, Land's name did not appear on the ballot. He won, nonetheless, as a write-in candidate, a difficult and "unusual" way to get elected. In subsequent elections, Senator Land's name appeared on the ballot as the official Republican candidate for the seat. In the mid-1990s, after his time in the Legislature, Land served on the Columbus City Council.

=== Personal life ===
Land was born into a family which wielded a considerable amount of political influence, in and about Columbus. His uncle, John Henry Land was elected to one term in the Georgia State Senate from 1949 to 1950 before serving as a Superior Court Judge for twenty-four years. Other uncles and cousins served on Columbus City Council. Another cousin, Clay D. Land, who also served on the Columbus City Council, was elected to the Georgia State Senate in 1994, and served three terms representing the same district previously held by Ted Land. In 2001, Clay Land was appointed to the position of United States District Court Judge, by President Bush.
