= Frank William Land =

Frank William Land (9 January 1911 in Edmonton, Middlesex – 2 June 1990 in Wrexham, Wales) was a populariser of mathematics and a professor of mathematics at Hull University.

He was lecturer at the College of St Mark and St John ('Marjohn') in Chelsea with Cyril Bibby, whom he later followed to Hull where he worked with Bill Cockcroft. For a time during the Second World War he taught at the Royal Grammar School, High Wycombe.

Marcus du Sautoy describes Land's book The Language of Mathematics as seminal in his intellectual development.

One of his children was the neurobiologist Professor Michael F. Land.

== Publications ==
- Land F.W. (1962) The Language of Mathematics John Murray, ASIN B0013FK5TW
