= Susan K. Land =

American software engineer

- Born: 1963 (age 62–63); Memphis, Tennessee, USA
- Education: University of Georgia, University of West Florida
- Occupation: Software engineer
- Known for: Work in software quality management, 2021 IEEE President
- Awards: Richard E. Merwin Award for Distinguished Service (2017)

Susan K. (Kathy) Land (born 1963) is an American software engineer known for her work in software quality management. She is a program manager in the US Missile Defense Agency, and was the 2021 president of the IEEE.

== Education and career ==
Land is originally from Memphis, Tennessee, where she was born in 1963. She grew up in Athens, Georgia, where her grandfather was a professor at the University of Georgia. After high school in Columbus, Georgia, she returned to the University of Georgia as an undergraduate, and earned a degree in education.

After finishing her degree and marrying, she moved with her husband to Naval Air Station Point Mugu, on the Central California coast. She had done some computer work at the University of Georgia Department of Genetics, and at Point Mugu she began working, initially as a clerk and later as a computer specialist and computer systems analyst. Her work there involved testing software for the AIM-54 Phoenix missile, and founding and running an Apple Macintosh user group, initially local, that eventually expanded to approximately 10,000 members across the US civil service.

In the early 1990s, she moved to Eglin Air Force Base in the Florida Panhandle, and began taking computer science courses through the University of West Florida, eventually earning a master's degree in program management information technology in approximately 2012. Through these courses and her work in Eglin, she began focusing on IEEE and its standardization of software and systems engineering, and developing a series of books on IEEE standards to replace a discontinued series of IEEE guidebooks.

After her start in the United States federal civil service, Land has worked for defense contractors including The Analytic Sciences Corporation, Northrop Grumman, TYBRIN Corporation, the Mitre Corporation, and Accenture before returning to civil service in the Missile Defense Agency.

She was president of the IEEE Computer Society in 2009, and was elected in 2019 as president of the IEEE, for the 2021 term.

== Recognition ==
Land was the 2017 recipient of the Richard E. Merwin Award for Distinguished Service of the IEEE Computer Society, "for exemplifying true volunteer spirit and commitment to excellence, for significant and continuing contributions that support the vision and mission of the IEEE and the Computer Society". She was elected as an IEEE Fellow, in the 2018 class of fellows, "for leadership in software product development".

== Books ==
Land is the author or coauthor of books including:

- Jumpstart CMM / CMMI Software Process Improvements: Using IEEE Software Engineering Standards (Wiley, 2005)
- Practical Support for CMMI-SW Software Project Documentation Using IEEE Software Engineering Standards (with John W. Walz, Wiley, 2005)
- Practical Support for ISO 9001 Software Project Documentation: Using IEEE Software Engineering Standards (with John W. Walz, Wiley, 2006)
- Practical Support for Lean Six Sigma Software Process Definition: Using IEEE Software Engineering Standards (with Douglas B. Smith and John W. Walz, Wiley, 2008)
