= William Augustus Bootle =

American judge (1902–2005)

Gus Bootle
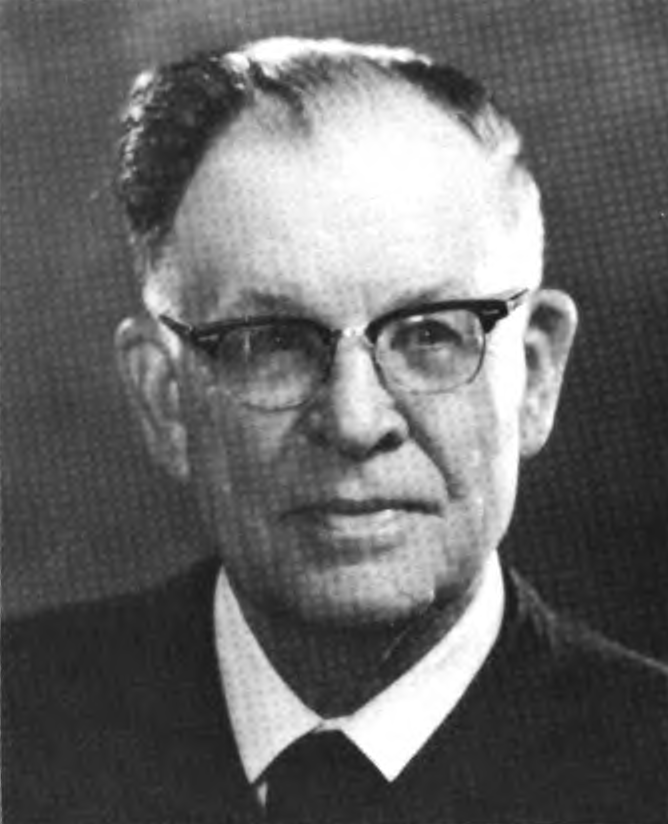

Senior Judge of the United States District Court for the Middle District of Georgia
- In office March 11, 1972 – January 25, 2005

Chief Judge of the United States District Court for the Middle District of Georgia
- In office 1961–1972
- Preceded by: Thomas Hoyt Davis
- Succeeded by: J. Robert Elliott

Judge of the United States District Court for the Middle District of Georgia
- In office May 20, 1954 – March 11, 1972
- Appointed by: Dwight D. Eisenhower
- Preceded by: Abraham Benjamin Conger
- Succeeded by: Wilbur Dawson Owens Jr.

Personal details
- Born: William Augustus Bootle; August 19, 1902 Walterboro, South Carolina, U.S.
- Died: January 25, 2005 (aged 102) Macon, Georgia, U.S.
- Education: Mercer University (BA, LLB)

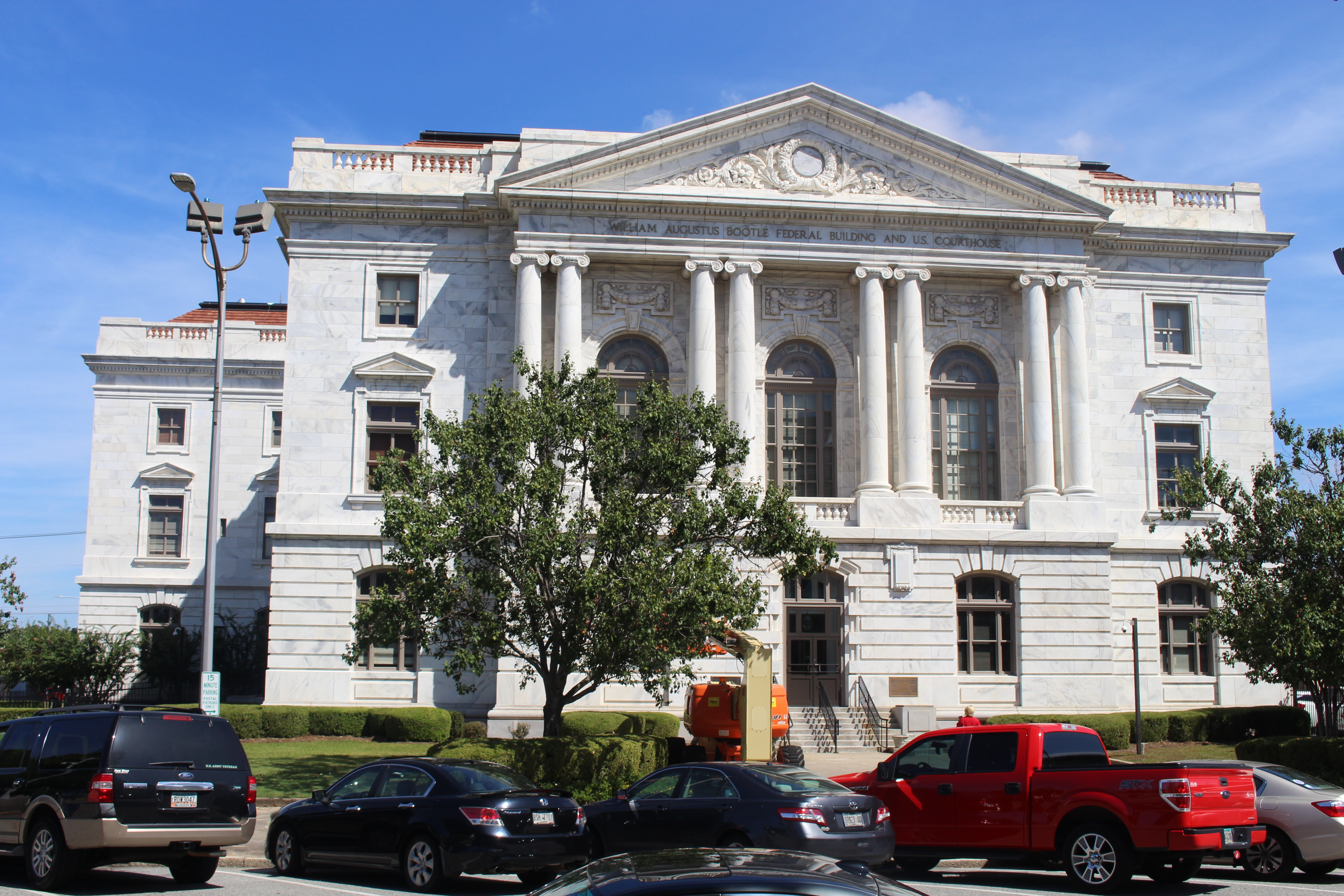
William Augustus Bootle Federal Building and Courthouse, Macon, Bibb County, Georgia

William Augustus Bootle (August 19, 1902 – January 25, 2005) was an American attorney and a United States district judge of the United States District Court for the Middle District of Georgia noted for helping oversee desegregation in the Southern United States.

== Early life and education ==
Born on August 19, 1902, in Walterboro, South Carolina, Bootle received an Artium Baccalaureus degree in 1924 from Mercer University and a Bachelor of Laws in 1925 from the Walter F. George School of Law at Mercer University. There he was a member of Phi Delta Theta.

== Career ==
Bootle entered private practice in Macon, Georgia from 1925 to 1928 and again from 1933 to 1954. He was a part-time professor at Mercer University from 1926 to 1937 and served as acting dean from 1933 to 1937. He was an Assistant United States Attorney for the Middle District of Georgia from 1928 to 1929 and was the United States Attorney for the Middle District of Georgia from 1929 to 1933.

=== Federal judicial service ===
Bootle was nominated by President Dwight D. Eisenhower on May 3, 1954, to a seat on the United States District Court for the Middle District of Georgia vacated by Judge Abraham Benjamin Conger. He was confirmed by the United States Senate on May 18, 1954, and received his commission on May 20, 1954. He served as Chief Judge from 1961 to 1972. He assumed senior status on March 11, 1972. His service terminated on January 25, 2005, due to his death in Macon.

==== Notable case ====
Bootle ordered the first admission of an African-American student to the University of Georgia in 1961 (Hamilton E. Holmes and Charlayne Hunter).

== Death ==
Bootle's wife of more than 70 years, Virginia Childs Bootle, died on June 24, 2004. Bootle died at his home in 2005 at the age of 102.

== Honors ==
The federal building and courthouse at Macon, Georgia was renamed the William Augustus Bootle Federal Building and United States Courthouse in June 1998. In 1982, Bootle was awarded an honorary Doctor of Laws degree from Mercer University.

== See also ==
- List of centenarians (jurists and practitioners of law)
- List of United States federal judges by longevity of service

Legal offices
Preceded by Abraham Benjamin Conger	Judge of the United States District Court for the Middle District of Georgia; 1954–1972	Succeeded by Wilbur Dawson Owens Jr.
Preceded by Thomas Hoyt Davis	Chief Judge of the United States District Court for the Middle District of Georgia; 1961–1972	Succeeded by J. Robert Elliott
