= United States District Court for the Middle District of Georgia =

United States federal district court in Georgia (U.S. state)

Coordinates: 32°50′14.0″N 83°37′31.6″W

- (M.D. Ga.)
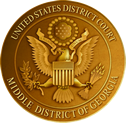
- Location: William Augustus Bootle Federal Building and U.S. Courthouse (Macon) More locations: Albany; Athens; United States Post Office and Courthouse (Columbus); Valdosta
- Appeals to: Eleventh Circuit
- Established: May 28, 1926
- Judges: 4
- Chief Judge: Leslie Abrams Gardner

Officers of the court
- U.S. Attorney: William R. Kayes (interim)
- U.S. Marshal: Stephen D. Lynn
- www.gamd.uscourts.gov

The U.S. District Court for the Middle District of Georgia (in case citations, M.D. Ga.) is a United States district court which serves the residents of seventy counties from five divisions from its headquarters in Macon, Georgia.

Appeals from cases brought in the Middle District of Georgia are taken to the United States Court of Appeals for the Eleventh Circuit (except for patent claims and claims against the U.S. government under the Tucker Act, which are appealed to the Federal Circuit).

As of June 24, 2025 the interim United States attorney is William R. Kayes.

== History ==
The United States District Court for the District of Georgia was one of the original 13 courts established by the Judiciary Act of 1789, 1 Stat. 73, on September 24, 1789. The District was subdivided into Northern and Southern Districts on August 11, 1848, by 9 Stat. 280. The Middle District was formed from portions of those two Districts on May 28, 1926, by 44 Stat. 670.

== Jurisdiction ==
The Albany division serves: Baker, Ben Hill, Calhoun, Crisp, Decatur, Dougherty, Early, Grady, Lee, Miller, Mitchell, Schley, Seminole, Sumter, Terrell, Turner, Webster, and Worth counties.

The Athens division hears cases from: Clarke, Elbert, Franklin, Greene, Hart, Madison, Morgan, Oconee, Oglethorpe, and Walton counties.

The Columbus division includes: Chattahoochee, Clay, Harris, Marion, Muscogee, Quitman, Randolph, Stewart, Talbot, and Taylor counties.

The Macon division serves: Baldwin, Bibb, Bleckley, Butts, Crawford, Dooly, Hancock, Houston, Jasper, Jones, Lamar, Macon, Monroe, Peach, Pulaski, Putnam, Twiggs, Upson, Washington, Wilcox and Wilkinson counties.

The Valdosta division hears cases for: Berrien, Brooks, Clinch, Colquitt, Cook, Echols, Irwin, Lanier, Lowndes, Thomas, and Tift counties.

== Current judges ==
As of June 1, 2024:

#	Title	Judge	Duty station	Born	Term of service			Appointed by
#	Title	Judge	Duty station	Born	Active	Chief	Senior	Appointed by
14	Chief Judge	Leslie Abrams Gardner	Albany	1974	2014–present	2024–present	—	Obama
12	District Judge	Clay D. Land	Columbus	1960	2001–present	2014–2020	—	G.W. Bush
13	District Judge	Marc T. Treadwell	Macon	1955	2010–present	2020–2024	—	Obama
15	District Judge	Tripp Self	Macon	1968	2018–present	—	—	Trump
9	Senior Judge	W. Louis Sands	Albany	1949	1994–2014	2001–2006	2014–present	Clinton
11	Senior Judge	C. Ashley Royal	Macon	1949	2001–2016	2008–2014	2016–present	G.W. Bush

== Former judges ==
#	Judge	Born–died	Active service	Chief Judge	Senior status	Appointed by	Reason for termination
1	William Josiah Tilson	1871–1949	1926–1927 (Note: Recess appointment; the United States Senate later rejected the appointment.); 1927–1928 (Note: Recess appointment; resigned prior to Senate consideration of the appointment.)	—	—	Coolidge	not confirmed resignation
2	Bascom Sine Deaver	1882–1944	1928–1944	—	—	Coolidge	death
3	Thomas Hoyt Davis	1892–1969	1945–1961	1949–1961	1961–1969	F. Roosevelt	death
4	Abraham Benjamin Conger	1887–1953	1949–1953	—	—	Truman	death
5	William Augustus Bootle	1902–2005	1954–1972	1961–1972	1972–2005	Eisenhower	death
6	J. Robert Elliott	1910–2006	1962–2000	1972–1980	—	Kennedy	retirement
7	Wilbur Dawson Owens Jr.	1930–2010	1972–1995	1980–1995	1995–2010	Nixon	death
8	Duross Fitzpatrick	1934–2008	1985–2001	1995–2001	2001–2008	Reagan	death
10	Hugh Lawson	1941–2024	1995–2008	2006–2008	2008–2024	Clinton	death

== Chief judges ==
Chief judges have administrative responsibilities with respect to their district court. Unlike the Supreme Court, where one justice is specifically nominated to be chief, the office of chief judge rotates among the district court judges. To be chief, a judge must have been in active service on the court for at least one year, be under the age of 65, and have not previously served as chief judge.

A vacancy is filled by the judge highest in seniority among the group of qualified judges. The chief judge serves for a term of seven years, or until age 70, whichever occurs first. The age restrictions are waived if no members of the court would otherwise be qualified for the position.

When the office was created in 1948, the chief judge was the longest-serving judge who had not elected to retire, on what has since 1958 been known as senior status, or declined to serve as chief judge. After August 6, 1959, judges could not become or remain chief after turning 70 years old. The current rules have been in operation since October 1, 1982.

== Succession of seats ==
Seat 1
Seat established on May 28, 1926 by 44 Stat. 670
Tilson	1926–1927
Tilson	1927–1928
Deaver	1928–1944
Davis	1945–1961
Elliot	1962–2000
Land	2001–present

Seat 2
Seat established on March 29, 1949 by 63 Stat. 16 (temporary)
Conger	1949–1953
Seat made permanent on May 19, 1961 by 75 Stat. 80
Bootle	1954–1972
Owens, Jr.	1972–1995
Lawson	1995–2008
Treadwell	2010–present

Seat 3
Seat established on July 10, 1984 by 98 Stat. 333
Fitzpatrick	1985–2001
Royal	2001–2016
Self	2018–present

Seat 4
Seat established on December 1, 1990 by 104 Stat. 5089
Sands	1994–2014
Gardner	2014–present

== See also ==
- Courts of Georgia
- List of current United States district judges
- List of United States federal courthouses in Georgia
