= Abraham Benjamin Conger =

American politician and judge from Georgia

Judge of the United States District Court for the Middle District of Georgia
- In office June 6, 1949 – December 9, 1953
- Appointed by: Harry S. Truman
- Preceded by: Seat established by 63 Stat. 16
- Succeeded by: William Augustus Bootle

Personal details
- Born: Abraham Benjamin Conger; July 14, 1887 Tift County, Georgia
- Died: December 9, 1953 (aged 66)
- Education: Mercer University (A.B.); Walter F. George School of Law (LL.B.)
- Occupation: Politician, judge

Abraham Benjamin Conger (July 14, 1887 – December 9, 1953) was a politician from Georgia and United States district judge of the United States District Court for the Middle District of Georgia.

== Education and career ==
Born in Tift County, Georgia, Conger received an Artium Baccalaureus degree from Mercer University in 1911 and a Bachelor of Laws from the Walter F. George School of Law at Mercer University in 1912. He was in private practice in Bainbridge, Georgia from 1912 to 1949, also serving as a member of the Georgia House of Representatives from 1915 to 1916, and as Mayor of Bainbridge from 1922 to 1923.

== Federal judicial service ==
On May 19, 1949, Conger was nominated by President Harry S. Truman to a new seat on the United States District Court for the Middle District of Georgia created by 63 Stat. 16. He was confirmed by the United States Senate on June 2, 1949, and received his commission on June 6, 1949. He served until his death on December 9, 1953.

== Sources ==
Legal offices
Preceded by Seat established by 63 Stat. 16	Judge of the United States District Court for the Middle District of Georgia; 1949–1953	Succeeded by William Augustus Bootle
