= Michael F. Land =

British neurobiologist (1942–2020)

Michael F. Land FRS
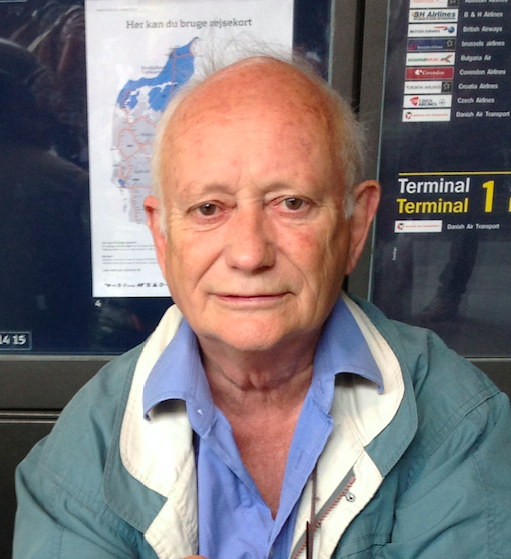
- Land in 2013
- Born: 12 April 1942; England
- Died: 14 December 2020 (aged 78)
- Education: Birkenhead School
- Alma mater: University of Cambridge
- Scientific career
- Fields: Neurobiology
- Workplaces: Sussex Centre for Neuroscience
- Thesis: (1968)

Michael Francis "Mike" Land FRS (12 April 1942 – 14 December 2020) was a British neurobiologist. He was a professor of neurobiology in the vision laboratory at the Sussex Centre for Neuroscience, University of Sussex, England.

Land's research was on different aspects of animal and human vision. His interests were in the optics of the eyes of marine animals, including scallops, shrimps and deep-water crustaceans. He also studied visual behaviour in spiders and insects, particularly during pursuit. This led to an interest in eye movement in animals and later in man.

Land's group was mainly concerned with the role of eye movement in human activities such as driving, music reading and ball games. In 2000, Land and a colleague reported their finding that within 200 milliseconds after a ball leaves a cricket bowler's hand, the best batsmen will take their eyes off the ball and look ahead to the point where they have calculated it will bounce (see also Land & McLeod (2000) in bibliography).

Other work was on the processing of visual information by the retinas of mosquitoes.

He died on 14 December 2020 at the age of 78.

== Education ==
The son of Frank William Land, from 1950 to 1960 he attended Birkenhead School, a direct grant school, on the Wirral in Cheshire. From there he went to Jesus College, Cambridge, where he studied zoology, graduating in 1963. A PhD in neurophysiology at University College London (UCL) followed, completed in 1968. It was at UCL that Land began his research into human and animal vision.

== Academic career ==
After completing his PhD at UCL, where he had been an assistant lecturer in Physiology, in 1969 Land became assistant professor of Physiology at University of California, Berkeley. He returned to the UK in 1971, taking up a post as a lecturer in neurobiology at the University of Sussex. Here he was appointed a reader in 1977. After being elected a Fellow of the Royal Society in 1982 he was appointed as a professor in 1984. He was also a senior visiting fellow at the Australian National University, Canberra from 1982 to 1984. In 1994 he received the Frink Medal of the Zoological Society of London, and in 1996 the Alcon Prize for vision research. In 1998, he was elected a member of the Academia Europaea. Land retired from full-time academic work in 2005 and became an emeritus professor at Sussex.

== Bibliography ==
- Land M.F., Tatler B.W. (2009) Looking and Acting: Vision and eye movements in natural behaviour. Oxford University Press, ISBN 0-19-857094-5.
- Land M.F. (2007). Fixation strategies during active behaviour. A brief history. In: Eye movements: a window on mind and brain (eds. RPG van Gompel, M.H. Fischer, W.S. Murray, R.L. Hill) Chapter 4. Oxford: Elsevier, ISBN 0-08-044980-8.
- Lim M.L.M., Land M.F., Li D. (2007). Sex-specific UV and fluorescence signals in jumping spiders. Science 315: 481
- Kuhn G., Land M.F. (2006). There's more to magic than meets the eye! Current Biology 16: R950-R951
- Land M.F., Nilsson D-E. (2006). General purpose and special purpose visual systems. In: Invertebrate vision (eds. D-E. Nilsson, E.J. Warrant) pp 167–210. Cambridge University Press, ISBN 0-521-83088-5.
- Land M.F. (2006). Eye movements and the control of actions in everyday life. Progress in Retinal and Eye Research 25: 296-324
- Land M.F. (2006). Visual optics: the shapes of pupils. Current Biology 16: R167-168
- Land M.F. (2005). Eye-hand coordination: learning a new trick. Current Biology 16: R995-956
- Land M.F. (2005). Q & A. Current Biology 15: R280-R281.
- Land M.F. (2005). The optical structures of animal eyes. Current Biology 15: R319-R323.
- Land MF, Horwood J (2005). Different retina-lamina projections in mosquitoes with fused and open rhabdoms. J. Comp. Physiol A (on line 04.05).
- Tatler B.W., Gilchrist I.D., Land M.F. (2005). Visual memory for objects in natural scenes: From fixations to object files. Quart. J. Exp. Psych. 58A (on line 10/04)
- Land M.F. (2004). Eyes and vision: in: The Crustacea vol 1. (eds. Forest J., Vaupel Klein J.C. von). pp 257–299. Leiden: Brill Publishers, ISBN 90-04-12918-9.
- Land M.F. (2004). Nocturnal vision: bees in the dark. Current Biology 14: R615-616.
- Land M.F. (2004). The coordination of rotations of the eyes, head and trunk in saccadic turns made in natural situations. Experimental Brain Research 159: 151–160.
- Mathger L.M., Land M.F., Siebeck U.E., Marshall N.J. (2003). Rapid colour change in multilayer reflecting stripes in the paradise whiptail, Pentapodus paradiseus. J. Exp. Biol. 206: 3607-3613
- Land M.F. (2003). Eye movements in daily life. In: The Visual Neurosciences (eds L.M. Chalupa, J.S. Werner) chapter 91. Cambridge MA: MIT Press, ISBN 0-262-03308-9.
- Kleinlogel S., Marshall N.J., Horwood J.M., Land M.F. (2003) Neuroarchitecture of the color and polarization vision system of the stomatopod Haptosquilla. J. Comp. Neurol. 467: 326-342
- Land M.F. (2003) The spatial resolution of the pinhole eyes of giant clams (Tridacna maxima). Proc. R. Soc. B 270: 185-188
- Land M.F., Nilsson D-E. (2001) Animal Eyes. Oxford University Press, ISBN 0-19-850968-5.
- Land M.F., Tatler B.W. (2001) Steering with the head: the visual strategy of a racing driver. Current Biology 11: 1215-1220
- Land M.F., Hayhoe M. (2001) In what ways do eye movements contribute to everyday activities. Vision Research 41: 3559-3565
- Land M.F., McLeod P. (2000) From eye movements to actions: how batsmen hit the ball. Nature Neuroscience 3: 1340-1345
- Land M.F. (2000) On the functions of double eyes in mid-water animals. Phil. Trans. R. Soc. Lond. B 355: 1147-1150
- Land M.F., Mennie N., Rusted J. (1999) The roles of vision and eye movements in the control of activities of daily living. Perception 28: 1311-1328
- Land M.F., Gibson, G., Horwood, J. and Zeil, J. (1999) Fundamental differences in the optical structure of the eyes of nocturnal and diurnal mosquitoes. J. Comp. Physiol. 185: 91-103.
- Land M.F. (1999) Motion and vision: why animals move their eyes. J. Comp. Physiol. 185: 341-352
- Dacke M., Nilsson D-E, Warrant E.J., Blest A.D., Land M.F., O'Carroll D.C. (1999) Built-in polarizers form part of a compass organ in spiders. Nature 401: 470–473.
- Land M.F. (1998) The visual control of steering. In: Vision and Action (eds Harris L.R. & Jenkin K.) 163–180. Cambridge University Press, ISBN 0-521-63162-9.
