= Clay D. Land =

American judge (born 1960)

Chief Judge of the United States District Court for the Middle District of Georgia
- In office October 1, 2014 – June 30, 2020
- Preceded by: C. Ashley Royal
- Succeeded by: Marc T. Treadwell

Judge of the United States District Court for the Middle District of Georgia
- Incumbent
- Assumed office December 21, 2001
- Appointed by: George W. Bush
- Preceded by: J. Robert Elliott

Member of the Georgia Senate from the 16th District
- In office 1995–2000
- Succeeded by: Seth Harp

Member of the Columbus, Georgia City Council
- In office 1993–1994

Personal details
- Born: Clay Daniel Land; March 24, 1960 (age 66) Shreveport, Louisiana, U.S.
- Party: Republican
- Spouse: Shannon M. Fedler
- Education: University of Georgia (BBA, JD)

Clay Daniel Land (born March 24, 1960) is an American lawyer who serves as a United States district judge of the United States District Court for the Middle District of Georgia.

== Education ==
Land was born in Shreveport, Louisiana. He received a Bachelor of Business Administration from the University of Georgia in 1982 and a Juris Doctor from the University of Georgia Law School in 1985.

== Career ==
=== Legal career ===
Land was in private practice in Columbus, Georgia from 1985 to 2001.

=== Political career ===
Land served as a member of the Columbus City Council from 1993 to 1994. In 1994 he was elected to the Georgia State Senate as a Republican. He served three terms (6 years) representing District 16, the same seat previously held by his cousin Ted. J. Land from 1979 to 1991.

=== Federal judicial service ===
On September 21, 2001, President George W. Bush nominated Land to a seat on the United States District Court for the Middle District of Georgia vacated by Judge J. Robert Elliott. Land was confirmed by the United States Senate on December 13, 2001, and received his commission on December 21, 2001. He served as chief judge from October 1, 2014, to June 30, 2020.

== Notable cases ==
Land was in the spotlight in late 2009 when he tried the case Rhodes v. Macdonald, in which Army physician Connie Rhodes attempted to secure a restraining order against her being deployed to Iraq on the argument that President Barack Obama was not born in the United States and was ineligible to serve as President. Land rejected the argument as frivolous. Within hours of Land's decision, the physician's attorney, Orly Taitz, told the news site Talking Points Memo that she felt Land's refusal to hear her case was an act of treason. Two days later, she filed a motion to stay Rhodes' deployment pending rehearing of the dismissal order. She repeated her treason allegations against Land and made several other intemperate statements, including claims that Land was aiding and abetting purported aspirations of "dictatorship" by Obama. Land rejected the motion as frivolous and ordered her to show cause why she should not be fined $10,000 for abuse of judicial process.

After Rhodes asked for Taitz to be removed as her attorney, on October 13, 2009, Judge Land issued a scathing 40-page ruling sanctioning Taitz and imposed a monetary penalty of $20,000 under Rule 11 of the Federal Rules of Civil Procedure. Upon learning of Land's ruling, Taitz told Talking Points Memo that she would not pay the fine, calling it "intimidation".

Judge Land ruled to continue the incarceration of ICE detainees at the Irwin County Detention Center in Irwin County, Georgia during the COVID-19 crisis. During the more than three-month period, from the original filing to the day of the hearing, one inmate in a nearby facility died from the disease. In his summation he indicated that he had "not heard anything terribly persuasive to change my mind."

== Sources ==
Legal offices
Preceded by J. Robert Elliott	Judge of the United States District Court for the Middle District of Georgia; 2001–present	Incumbent
Preceded by C. Ashley Royal	Chief Judge of the United States District Court for the Middle District of Georgia; 2014–2020	Succeeded by Marc T. Treadwell
