= E. Trenton Brown III =

American judge

Judge of the Georgia Court of Appeals
- Incumbent
- Assumed office May 16, 2018
- Appointed by: Nathan Deal
- Preceded by: Tripp Self

Personal details
- Education: University of Georgia (BA); Mercer University (JD)

E. Trenton Brown III is a judge of the Georgia Court of Appeals.

== Education ==
Brown received a Bachelor of Arts degree in Economics from the University of Georgia at Athens in 1995 and a Juris Doctor from Mercer University School of Law in 1999.

== Career ==
After his graduation from law school, he served as sole practitioner at Trenton Brown III, PC in Eatonton, Georgia.

=== State court service ===
Brown was appointed judge of the State Court of Putnam County by Governor Sonny Perdue in 2008, then appointed judge of Superior Court in the Ocmulgee Judicial Circuit in 2012 by Governor Nathan Deal. He successfully ran unopposed in 2014 and again in 2018.

=== Georgia Court of Appeals ===
On May 10, 2018, Governor Deal appointed Brown to the Court of Appeals of Georgia to fill the vacancy left by Tripp Self III, who had been appointed to a federal judgeship. Brown was sworn into office on June 5, 2018. On June 22, 2023, he was sworn in as the vice chief judge for a term commencing on July 1.

== Personal life ==
Brown lives in Putnam County, Georgia with his wife, Jill, a teacher, and their two children.

Legal offices
Preceded by Tripp Self	Judge of the Georgia Court of Appeals; 2018–present	Incumbent
