= Alcovy, Georgia =

Unincorporated community in Georgia, U.S.

Coordinates: 33°38′23″N 83°47′13″W

Alcovy is an unincorporated community in Newton County, in the U.S. state of Georgia.

== History ==
A post office was in operation at Alcovy from 1893 until 1901. The community took its name from the nearby Alcovy River. Alcovy was a depot on the Georgia Railroad. Variant names were "Alcova" and "Alcovee".
