= University of Georgia School of Law =

Public law school in Athens, Georgia, US

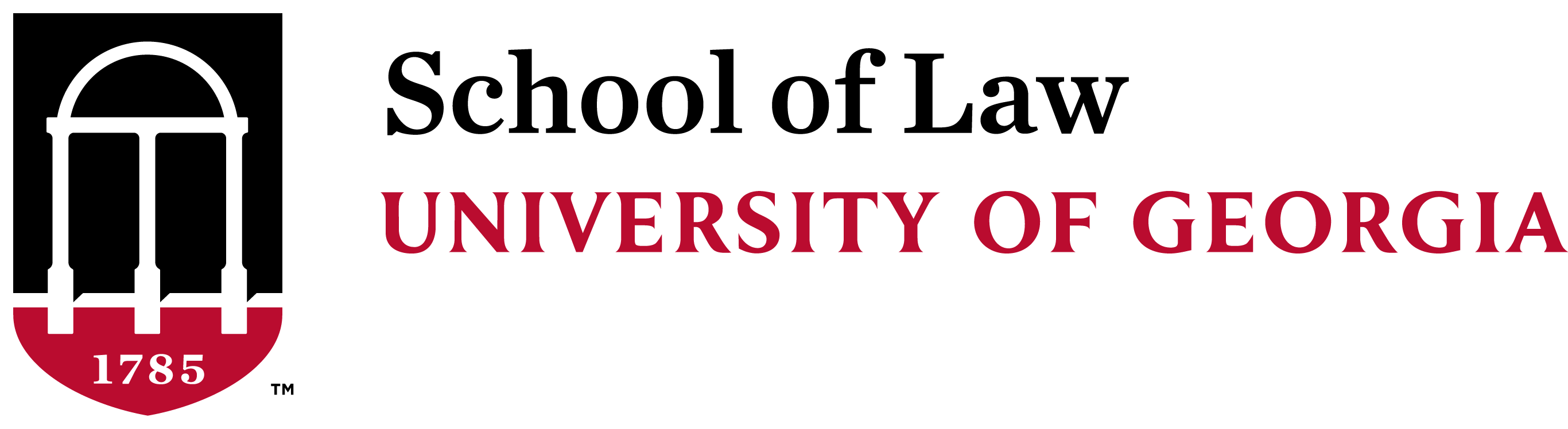
- Motto: Justitia (Latin for Justice)
- Established: 1859; 167 years ago
- School type: Public law school
- Parent endowment: $2.18 billion (2025)
- Dean: Usha R. Rodrigues
- Location: Athens, Georgia, US
- Enrollment: 577
- Faculty: 107
- USNWR ranking: 22nd (tie) (2025)
- Bar pass rate: 90.37% (2024 first-time takers, all jurisdictions)
- Website: law.uga.edu
- ABA profile: Georgia Law
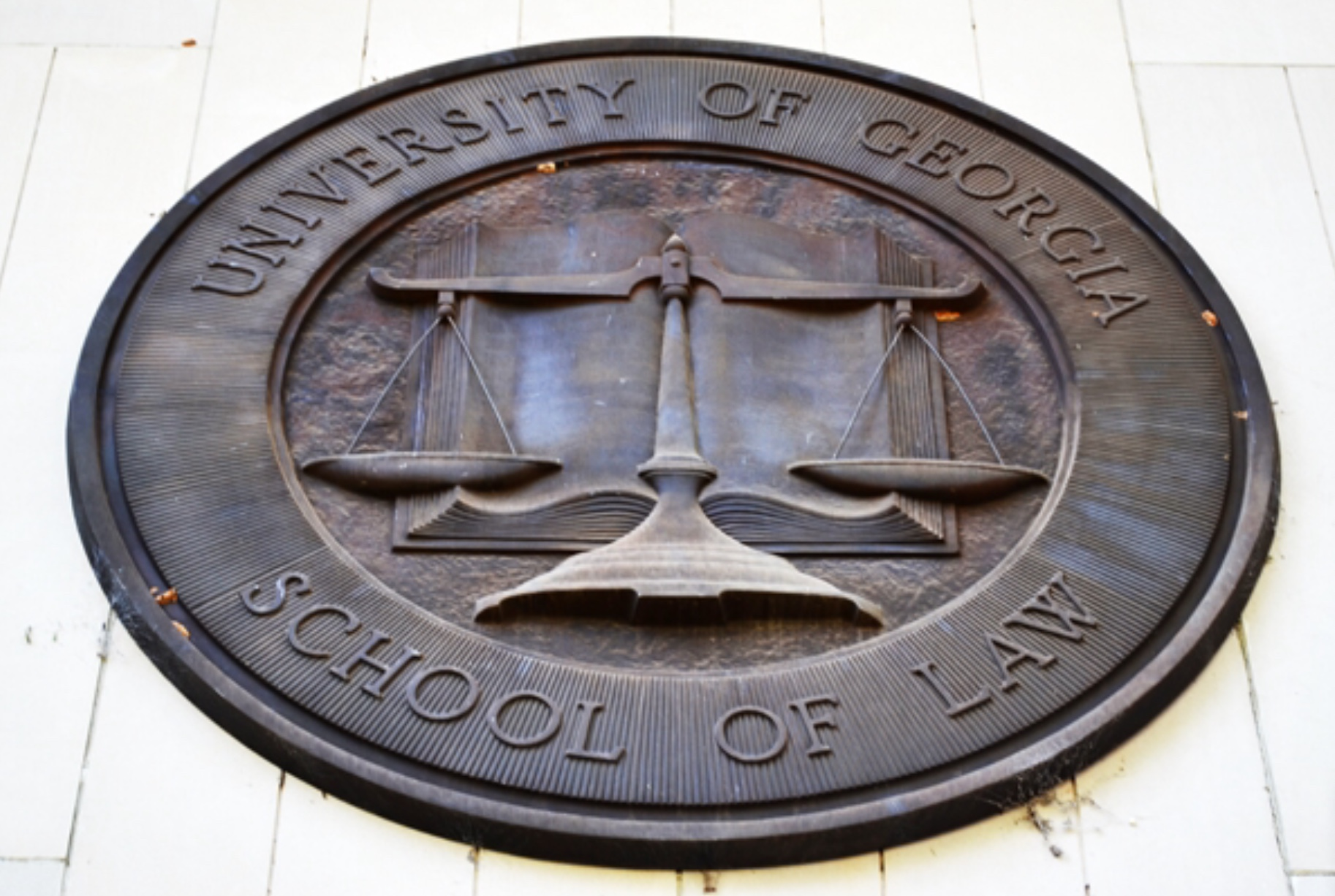

The University of Georgia School of Law (Georgia Law) is the law school of the University of Georgia, a public research university in Athens, Georgia. It was founded in 1859, making it one of the oldest American university law schools in continuous operation. Georgia Law accepted 12.72% of applicants for the class entering in 2025.

Georgia Law recent graduates include 11 governors, over 110 state and federal legislators, approximately 70 federal judges, and numerous state supreme court justices, practitioners, government officials, ambassadors, trial court judges, academics and law firm principals. Notable recent alumni of Georgia Law include former acting United States Attorney General Sally Yates, former President Pro Tempore of the U.S. Senate Richard B. Russell Jr., former Chief Judge and present Senior Judge of the U.S. Court of Appeals Larry Edmondson, and Ertharin Cousin, named to the TIME 100 most influential people in the world list and Payne Distinguished Professor at Stanford University's Freeman Spogli Institute for International Studies.

== History ==
The law school was founded in 1859. The founding three professors of the university's new law school included one of the United States' first state supreme court chief justices, Joseph Lumpkin, a Princeton alumnus. Joining him was attorney Thomas Cobb, who was the author of first enacted comprehensive codification of common law in the United States. The third original law professor was William Hull, an honors graduate of the University of Georgia, who had been a United States Attorney and a Solicitor General of the United States. Previously, law courses had been offered as part of the undergraduate curriculum of Franklin College of the university. The first classes of the Lumpkin Law School, as it was originally designated, were held at the law offices of Lumpkin and Cobb at the corner of Prince Avenue and Pulaski Street until 1873.

University of Georgia Law School, Class of 1889

By 1880, the curriculum included courses in equity, parliamentary law, and various commercial law studies such as partnership, insurance, tax, and tariffs. Around 1889, stricter admission standards mandated that students be at least 18 years old. Two years later, an entrance exam had been instituted. The modern method of case law instruction was ushered in during the 1920s. In December 1931, the school was granted membership in the Association of American Law Schools. After being housed in various buildings over the years, the law school in 1932 moved into the new Hirsch Hall, named in honor of prominent attorney Harold Hirsch, located on historic North Campus at the University of Georgia.

Hirsch Hall, expanded by many thousands of square feet over the years in connected buildings and upgrades, remains the site of law school classrooms and offices, as well as the Alexander Campbell King Law Library and the Hatton Lovejoy Courtroom. A 2012 renovation created almost 4,000 square feet of additional space, including a cafe and enclosed three story courtyard.

The law school's four-story, 40,000-square-foot separate addition, Dean Rusk Hall, opened in 1996 adjacent to Hirsch Hall. Named for former U.S. Secretary of State Dean Rusk, who was a Georgia Law professor, this building became the new home of the Dean Rusk International Law Center, founded in 1977. Dean Rusk Hall also houses additional classrooms, faculty offices, and library space, and a second law school courtroom, the James E. Butler Courtroom.

In the three years up to 2020, the Law School raised an additional $61 million to add to its endowment for scholarships, teaching, clinics, and experiential offerings. In 2024, the Law School received an additional $5 million donation from the Stanton Foundation.

== Academics ==
More than 300 courses, clinics, and seminars are offered at Georgia Law, including business-related law, property-related law, personal rights and public interest law, trial and appellate practice, as well as global practice preparation. Although academics, theory, and legal reasoning are primary, Georgia Law is also ranked A+ and 16th of all ABA law schools for practical training. Ninety-four percent of students participate in clinics and externships.

Degrees awarded include the Juris Doctor (J.D.), the Master of Laws (LL.M.) for foreign-trained lawyers, and the Master in the Study of Law (M.S.L.) for those who do not want to practice law, but wish to gain an understanding of legal principles and perspectives in order to advance their careers. Students also may choose to pursue interdisciplinary coursework in other University schools and colleges, or to earn one of many dual degrees including a J.D./M.B.A. or LL.M./M.B.A.

The law school is accredited by the American Bar Association (ABA), is a member of the Association of American Law Schools, has a chapter of the Order of the Coif, and is host to two advocacy inns: Lumpkin Inn of Court, one of the earliest American inns of court, and E. Wycliffe Orr Sr. American Inn of Court. Both are modeled after the English Inns of Court. It is also an academic partner of the American Society of International Law.

=== Admissions ===
The law school is among the most selective law schools in the nation, Georgia Law accepting 12.72% of applicants for the class entering in 2025, with that class having a median LSAT score of 169, a 75th percentile LSAT score of 171, and on a 4.0 scale, a median undergraduate GPA of 3.92, and 75th percentile GPA of 3.97. Georgia Law's 2025 average selectivity rating was 96 out of a possible maximum of 99, Georgia Law enrolled students being within the top 3% of ABA law school applicants. Approximately 27% of enrolled students self-identify as belonging to historically underrepresented groups. Although grades, degrees earned, and standardized test scores are important, for each applicant the admissions committee primarily considers a mandatory personal admission essay, a mandatory resume detailing the applicant's education, employment, fellowships, skills, honors, awards, community involvement, volunteer work, and other accomplishments, as well as mandatory letters of recommendation.

The 165 students entering in 2023 came from 26 states, 15 countries, and 66 undergraduate institutions. Of those students, 73% received merit based scholarships and 92% received some form of financial aid.

=== Student support, faculty, and faculty to student ratio ===
Georgia Law's Mentorship Program matches every law student with a faculty member mentor, an upperclassman peer mentor, a Career Development Office counselor, and an alumnus professional mentor. New students may participate in the voluntary Summer Academic Success Program that begins before orientation to enhance academic success and the transition to the rigors of law school.

There are just six students for each faculty member, The faculty includes nationally recognized members who publish in law reviews including such publications as the Yale Law Journal, Harvard Law Review, New York University Law Review, and Stanford Law Review.

=== Rankings ===
For the 2024 Top 50 Law School Rankings, of the 197 ABA-approved law schools, Georgia Law was ranked No.13. However, according to the study by Law School Transparency, Georgia Law ranked in the top ten nationally for employment outcomes, while The New York Times recognized Georgia law as being in the top five law schools offering the best salary-to-debt ratios in the nation. Furthermore, the law school has been ranked No.13 of the top best law schools by the National Jurist as well as by Above the Law. U.S. News & World Report's 2025 ranks Georgia Law tied for 22nd out of 198 ABA schools, with U.S. News also ranking Georgia Law the No.9 school out of 198 schools for Law Schools With the Most Graduates in Federal Clerkships. Also, Georgia Law is a top school for graduates appointed as federal judges. The school is additionally individually ranked in Trial Advocacy, Business/Corporate Law, Clinical Training, Constitutional Law, Contracts/Commercial Law, Dispute Resolution, Environmental Law, Intellectual Property Law, International Law, Healthcare Law, Legal Writing, and Tax Law. U.S. News also reported that, out of all law schools, Georgia Law is the second highest in ultimate bar passage. The school is ranked in the from the top 5 to top 9 of 198 schools for mock trial, moot court,and practical training. The school is ranked No.24 in international law by U.S. News. Georgia Law has also been ranked in the top ten in various experiential rankings: quality of life (6th), classroom experience (6th), professors (10th), accessibility of professors (2nd), academic experience (4th), and quality of teaching (9th). Finally, based on outcome-driven factors such as average indebtedness, bar passage, and employment, Georgia Law has been ranked No.1 as the best value in legal education in the United States by the National Jurist six times in the last nine years, including in 2026.

== Law review and journals ==
Georgia Law students publish four legal journals:
Georgia Law Review
Georgia Journal of Law & Technology
Georgia Journal of International and Comparative Law
Georgia Criminal Law Review.
These journals have frequently been cited by federal and state courts, as well as textbooks and law reviews. Membership on the journals is limited to students in their second and third years of law school. In addition to the Georgia Law Review, students publish the online component, the Georgia Law Review Posts, which features essays by students, practitioners, judges, and professors focused primarily on timely legal issues in the U.S. Supreme Court and U.S. courts of appeals.

== Alexander Campbell King Law Library ==
Entrance to the Alexander Campbell King Law Library.

The Alexander Campbell King Law Library is the oldest and largest law library in the state of Georgia. In 1967, U.S. Supreme Court Justice Hugo Black gave the keynote address at an outdoor ceremony to dedicate a modern law library building adjacent to Hirsch Hall. Housing a collection of more than 500,000 digital and print titles, the law library is a founding member of the Legal Information Preservation Alliance and the Law Library Microform Consortium. It has been designated a Federal Depository Library. The library is also one of the United States' Specialized European Documentation Centres, houses the Faculty Writings Collection, the Phillips Nuremberg Trials Collection, the Rare Book Collection, and the J. Alton Hosch Collection, which includes the extensive personal library of Dean Hosch, a member of the law school faculty from 1935 to 1964.

The Louis B. Sohn Library on International Relations is housed within the school's Dean Rusk International Law Center. The Sohn library is the extensive international law collection of Louis B. Sohn, who was the Woodruff Chair professor at Georgia Law and previously the Bemis Professor of International Law at Harvard Law School.

== Clinics and related initiatives ==
For the 2025-26 academic year, more than 430 Georgia Law students enrolled in the school's 17 clinical and field placement programs for approximately 84,000 service-learning hours. There are over 100 organizations, experiential learning and practical training offerings, and other additional education opportunities at Georgia Law. Some of the offerings include, without limitation, the Business Law Clinic, Civil Law Practice Externships, the Corporate Counsel Externship, the Environmental Law Practicum, the Washington D.C. Semester in Practice, the First Amendment Clinic, Global Externships Overseas, Global Governance Summer School, the Atlanta Semester in Practice, Corsair Law Society (transactions and litigation in major financial markets), the Family Justice Clinic, Labor & Employment Law Association, Public Interest Law Council, Real Estate & Other Property Organization, the Mediation Clinic, the Community Health Law Partnership (HeLP) Clinic, Business Law Society, American Constitution Society, the Public Interest Practicum and Fellowships, Health Law Society, Intellectual Property Law Society, International Law Society, the Wilbanks Child Endangerment and Sexual Exploitation Clinic, Family Law Society, Association of Law and Politics, the Criminal Defense Practicum, the Prosecutorial Justice Program, Environmental Law Association, Veteran Legal Services Clinic, Trial Lawyers Association, Practicum in Animal Welfare Skills, Entertainment & Sports Law Society, Federal Bar Association, Tax Law Society, national award-winning moot court, mock trial, and negotiation programs (for example, in last five years members have been awarded 28 national and ten regional titles and, for the average of three years through 2023, the moot court program was ranked sixth best of all 196 U.S. ABA accredited law schools), Georgia Law–Leuven Centre Global Governance Summer School in Belgium, Georgia Law at the University of Oxford program, and the Capital Assistance Project. Students in the Appellate Litigation Clinic have briefed and argued before the U.S. Courts of Appeals for the Fourth, Ninth, Eleventh, and D.C. Circuits (with students winning five times in four courts in 2020–2021). The Global Externship initiative provides global practice preparation for many students each summer, for instance past practice preparation included, without limitation, placement with law firms like DLA Piper in Russia, GÖRG Partnerschaft von Rechtsanwälten mbB in Germany, Priti Suri & Associates (PSA) in India, Siqueira Castro Advogados in Brazil, and King & Wood Mallesons in China. To educate students in the benefits of public service and the functioning of the judiciary, up to 20 jurists, including U.S. Supreme Court justices, U.S. Court of Appeals judges, and trial judges, visit Georgia Law to teach classes.

== Costs ==
U.S. News & World Report ranks Georgia Law as having the lowest tuition of the top 20 law schools. The total of tuition and fees for one year at Georgia Law is $18,994 for Georgia residents and $37,752 for non-residents. The total cost of attendance (including the cost of tuition, fees, room and board, books and supplies, transportation, and miscellaneous personal expenses) for the 2022–23 academic year is estimated to be $36,694 for Georgia residents living on-campus, $39,860 for Georgia residents living off-campus, $56,286 for non-residents living on-campus, and $59,452 for non-residents living off-campus. Non-resident students are able to obtain Georgia residency at the beginning of their second year of law school, and besides other scholarships, available are tuition reduction scholarships that allow non-residents to pay resident tuition for one or two semesters of the first year of Georgia Law. Further, over 73% of the members of the class matriculating in 2024 received merit based scholarships funded by donors, 92% of students received some form of financial aid, and 50% of students did not need to borrow at all for their education. U.S. News & World Report ranked Georgia Law as a top five law school in having the 4th best salary to debt ratio, while Georgia Law has been ranked #1 as the best value in legal education in the United States by the National Jurist since 2019 for five years.

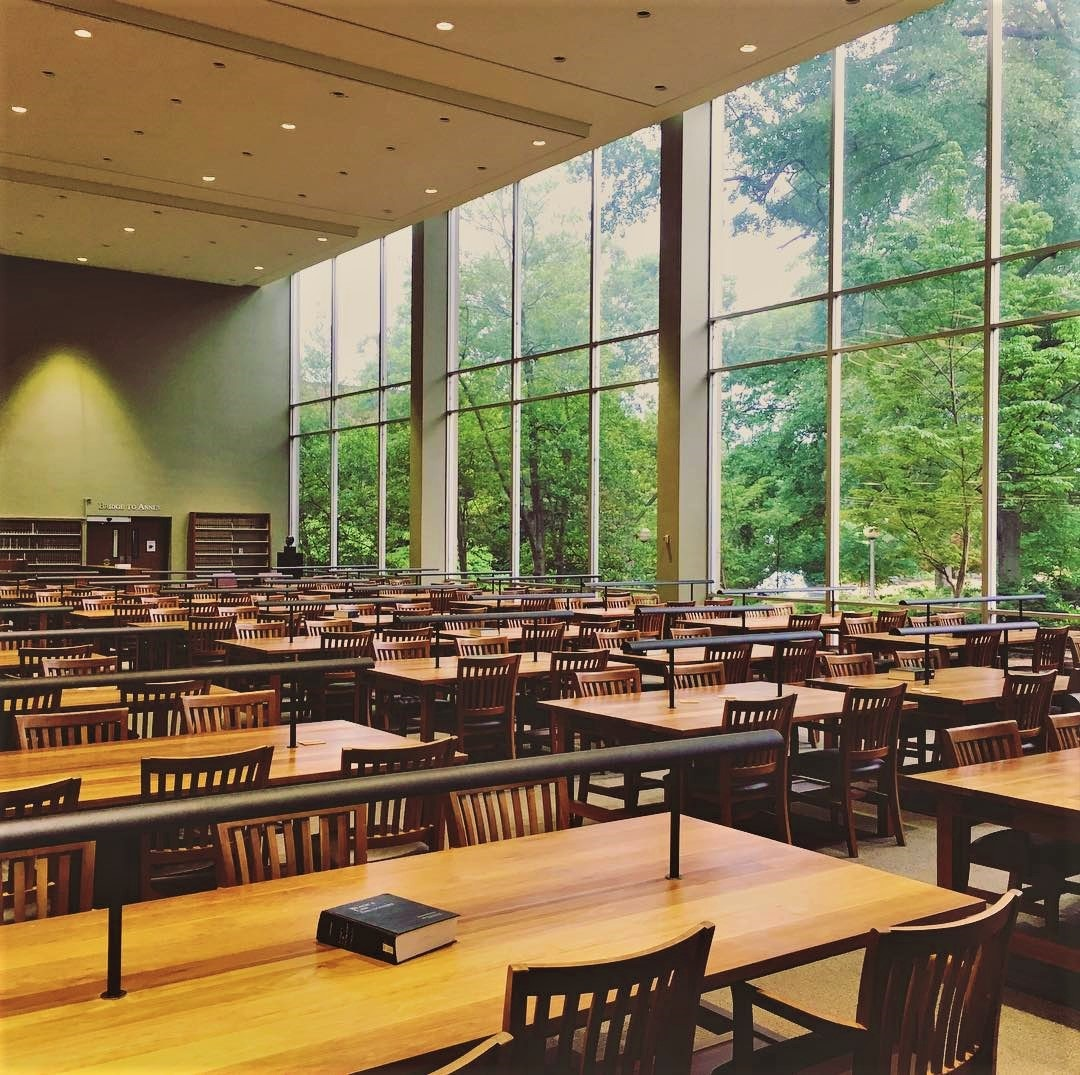
Carl E. Sanders Reading Room in the law library.

== Employment ==
Living Georgia Law graduates work in all 50 states and more than 60 countries. Those who graduated in 2021 are working in 26 states and abroad. According to ABA required disclosures, not including those choosing to open their own practices, to pursue additional education, etc., 98% of the 2022 graduating class were hired to perform high-value jobs within nine months after graduation, and 94.79% held full-time, long-term, JD-required positions at that point (Georgia Law being the nation's #1 law school for high-value jobs out of 196 ABA-approved schools). For the class graduating in 2022, Georgia Law was ranked in the top four of all 196 ABA approved law schools for the highest percentage of graduates obtaining full-time legal jobs requiring bar passage. Georgia Law was among the top law schools that sent the highest percentage of juris doctor graduates into associate positions at the largest 100 law firms in the country. Of 202 students who graduated in 2021 - not including those who opened their own practices, pursued additional education, etc. - 57 went to law firms with up to 50 attorneys, 54 to law firms with 51 to over 500 attorneys including 25 to law firms of over 500 attorneys, 5 to business organizations, 38 to government and public interest organizations (not including judicial clerkships that 38 graduates obtained) and six to academia.

Serving as a judicial clerk is considered one of the most prestigious positions in legal circles, and often opens up wide-ranging opportunities in private practice, high-ranking government work, and academia. Georgia Law has had six alumni serve as judicial clerks for justices of the United States Supreme Court since 2005. Based on the 2005-2021 graduating classes, the School of Law was ranked 14th among the nation's law schools for sending its graduates to clerk for the U.S. Supreme Court. For the class of 2021, Georgia Law placed 38 graduates in federal and state court clerkships (for 2020 Georgia Law had a top eight placement rate of all ABA approved law schools in the nation for federal court clerkships).

== Notable recent alumni ==
Georgia Law graduates work in all 50 states and more than 60 countries. Among recent Georgia Law graduates are 11 governors, more than 110 state and federal legislators, approximately 70 federal appeals and district court judges, multiple state trial and appeals court judges, numerous state supreme court justices, government officials, ambassadors, law firm principals, as well as other notable practitioners, leaders, authors, and academics. Some recent graduates include the following.

- Luis A. Aguilar (J.D. 1979), attorney, former Commissioner, U.S. Securities and Exchange Commission
- M. Neil Andrews (LL.B. 1956), former special assistant to the Attorney General of the United States, Chief of the Trial Section of the United States Department of Justice Criminal Division, United States Attorney, Chief Judge, U.S. District Court
- Ellis Arnall (LL.B. 1963), attorney, Am Law 200 law firm founder, former Governor
- R. Stan Baker (J.D. 2004), Judge, U.S. District Court
- Roy Barnes (J.D. 1972), former State Senator, former Governor, attorney, law firm founder
- Timothy Batten (J.D. 1984), Chief Judge, U.S. District Court
- Robert Benham (J.D. 1970), Chief Justice state Supreme Court, first African-American to serve as Justice of the Supreme Court of Georgia
- Charlie Bethel (J.D. 2001), Justice, state Supreme Court
- Keith R. Blackwell (J.D. 1999), Justice, state Supreme Court
- Thomas C. Bordeaux, Jr. (J.D. 1979), judge, attorney, and member state House of Representatives
- J. P. Boulee (J.D. 1996), former partner Jones Day, Judge, U.S. District Court
- Dudley Hollingsworth Bowen Jr. (LL.B. 1965), Judge, U.S. District Court
- Mike Bowers (J.D. 1974), state Attorney General
- Michael Lawrence Brown (J.D. 1994), Judge, U.S. District Court
- George Busbee (J.D. 1952), senior partner at King & Spalding international law firm, former Governor
- Valerie E. Caproni (J.D. 1979), Judge, U.S. District Court for the Southern District of New York; formerly, General Counsel, Federal Bureau of Investigation
- Julie E. Carnes (J.D. 1975), Judge, U.S. Court of Appeals
- Christopher M. Carr (J.D. 1999), state Attorney General
- John William Carter (J.D. 1975), investment consultant and state Senator
- Jason Carter (J.D. 2004), partner Bondurant, Mixson & Elmore, represents the National Football League Players Association, awarded the Stuart Eizenstat Lawyer Award, given by the Anti-Defamation League, for his pro bono work defending voting rights, state Senator
- Thomas Alonzo Clark (LL.B. 1949), Judge, U.S. Court of Appeals
- Harold G. Clarke (LL.B. 1952), Chief Justice, state Supreme Court
- Verda Colvin (J.D. 1993), Justice, state Supreme Court
- Christian A. Coomer (J.D. 1999), Judge, state Court of Appeals
- Ertharin Cousin (J.D. 1982), named to the TIME 100 most influential people in the world list, Payne Distinguished Professor at Stanford University's Freeman Spogli Institute for International Studies
- Bill Cowsert (J.D. 1983), attorney, State Senator and Majority Leader
- George W. Darden III (J.D. 1967), former Member U.S. House of Representatives; presidential appointee to the Board of the Overseas Private Investment Corporation; Advisor on behalf of the National Democratic Institute for International Affairs; partner, international law firm McKenna Long & Aldridge (now, Dentons)
- Bertis Downs IV (J.D. 1981), entertainment attorney
- Berry Avant Edenfield (LL.B. 1958), Chief Judge, U.S. District Court
- Newell Edenfield (LL.B. 1938), Senior Judge, U.S. District Court
- James Larry Edmondson (J.D. 1971), former Chief Judge, now Senior Judge, U.S. Court of Appeals
- John J. Ellington (J.D. 1985), Justice, state Supreme Court
- Randy Evans (J.D. 1983), attorney, partner Squire Patton Boggs, former ambassador, member Dentons international law firm U.S. board of directors, general counsel to Speaker of the U.S. House of Representatives
- Stacey Evans (J.D. 2003), attorney and State Representative
- Duross Fitzpatrick (LL.B. 1966), Chief Judge, U.S. District Court
- Norman S. Fletcher (J.D. 1958), Chief Justice, state Supreme Court
- Daisy Hurst Floyd (J.D.1980), attorney, law professor, and law school Dean
- Joan Gabel (J.D. 1993), American academic and first female President of the University of Minnesota, present Chancellor of the University of Pittsburgh
- Elizabeth Gobeil (J.D. 1995), Judge, state Court of Appeals
- Stephen S. Goss (J.D. 1986), Judge, state Court of Appeals
- Kenneth E. Gross, Jr. (J.D. 1978), Washington, D.C. attorney, former multilingual U.S. Foreign Service member in Germany, Nepal, Iraq, Malaysia, et al. and former ambassador
- James Randal Hall (J.D. 1982), Chief Judge, U.S. District Court
- Frank Hanna III (J.D. 1986), former corporate attorney, now entrepreneur, merchant banker, philanthropist, and Grand Cross Knight of the Order of St. Gregory the Great
- Kenneth B. Hodges, III (J.D. 1991), Judge, state Court of Appeals
- Pierre Howard (J.D. 1974), attorney, Lieutenant Governor, Senator
- C. Donald Johnson Jr. (J.D. 1973), attorney, academic, former Congressman U.S. House of Representatives; former ambassador at the Office of the United States Trade Representative; partner, Squire Patton Boggs
- Francys Johnson (J.D. 2006), civil rights attorney and academic
- Steve C. Jones (J.D. 1987), Judge, U.S. District Court
- Dar'shun N. Kendrick (J.D. 2007), attorney, member state House of Representatives
- Benjamin Land (J.D. 1992), Justice, state Supreme Court
- Clay D. Land (J.D. 1985), Chief Judge, U.S. District Court
- Edward H. Lindsey Jr. (J.D. 1984), attorney, law firm founder, partner in Dentons international law firm
- Thomas O. Marshall (J.D. 1941), Justice and Chief Justice of state Supreme Court
- Beverly B. Martin (J.D. 1981), Judge, U.S. Court of Appeals
- Leigh Martin May (J.D. 1998), Judge, U.S. District Court
- Scott F. McAfee (J.D. 2013), state trial judge, former state inspector general, United States Attorney
- Christopher J. McFadden (J.D. 1985), Presiding Judge, state Court of Appeals
- Carla Wong McMillian (J.D. 1998), Justice, state Supreme Court
- Peter Meldrim (LL.B. 1969), Judge, President of the American Bar Association, Commissioner of the Uniform Law Commission
- Harold D. Melton (J.D. 1991), former Chief Justice, state Supreme Court, partner Troutman Pepper Locke
- Patrick N. Millsaps (J.D. 2000), attorney and American film producer
- Tamika Montgomery-Reeves (J.D. 2006), Justice, state Supreme Court, former Chancellor, Delaware Court of Chancery, former attorney with Wilson Sonsini Goodrich & Rosati
- William Theodore Moore Jr. (J. D. 1964), Chief Judge, U.S. District Court
- Jere Morehead (J.D. 1980), president of a top 15 Public National University
- Lewis Render Morgan (J. D. 1935), Judge, U.S. Court of Appeals
- Thomas B. Murphy (J.D. 1949), attorney, Speaker, state House of Representatives from 1973 to 2002.
- Harold Lloyd Murphy (J. D. 1949), Judge, U. S. District Court
- Wilbur Dawson Owens Jr. (J.D. 1952), Chief Judge, U.S. District Court
- Charles A. Pannell Jr. (J.D. 1970), Senior Judge, U.S. District Court
- Phaedra Parks (J.D. 1999), attorney, author, activist, businesswoman, actress
- William Porter Payne (J.D. 1973), former Managing Director of Gleacher & Company, former Vice Chairman of Bank of America and other companies, president and CEO of the Committee for the Olympic Games responsible for bringing the 1996 Summer Olympics to the United States
- Charles Peeler (J.D. 1999), former United States Attorney, a managing partner of Troutman Pepper Locke
- Andrew Pinson (J.D. 2011), former Solicitor General, then Justice, state Supreme Court
- David Ralston (J.D. 1980), attorney, former member of state Senate, Speaker, state House of Representatives
- William McCrary Ray II (J.D. 1990), Judge, U. S. District Court
- Brian M. Rickman (J.D. 2001), Chief Judge, state Court of Appeals
- Jack L. Rives (J.D. 1977), Executive Director and Chief Operating Officer, American Bar Association
- William V. Roebuck (J.D. 1992), executive vice president of the Arab Gulf States Institute in Washington, previous U.S. Foreign Service postings throughout the Middle East, former acting U.S. Ambassador to Libya, former U.S. Ambassador to Bahrain, most recently deputy special envoy to the Global Coalition to Defeat ISIS and senior advisor to the Special Representative for Syria Engagement
- C. Ashley Royal (J.D. 1974), Judge, U. S. District Court
- Richard B. Russell Jr. (LL.B. 1938), U.S. Senator, former President Pro Tempore of the Senate
- Carl Sanders (J. D. 1947), former Governor, founder and chairman of international law firm Troutman Pepper Locke
- Frank W. "Sonny" Seiler (J.D. 1957), trial attorney, leading role in the longest-standing New York Times Best-Seller, Midnight in the Garden of Good and Evil
- Tilman E. Self (J.D. 1997), Judge, U.S. District Court
- Marvin Herman Shoob (J.D. 1948), Senior Judge, U.S. District Court
- Samuel Hale Sibley (LL.B. 1933), Judge, U.S. Court of Appeals
- Sidney Oslin Smith Jr. (J.D. 1949), Chief Judge, U.S. District Court
- George T. Smith (J. D. 1948), Justice, state Supreme Court, Speaker of the United States House of Representatives
- Richard W. Story (J.D. 1978), Judge, U.S. District Court
- Stephanie Stuckey (J.D. 1992), former member state House of Representatives (1999–2013), Executive Director of GreenLaw, corporate CEO
- Herman E. Talmadge (J.D. 1936), Governor, U.S. Senator
- Charles B. Tanksley (J.D. 1978), attorney, former state Senator
- Edward J. Tarver (1991), former state Senator, attorney, United States Attorney
- Robert L. Vining Jr. (J.D. 1959), Chief Judge, then Senior Judge, U.S. District Court
- Joe D. Whitley (J.D. 1975), youngest appointed United States Attorney, then United States Associate Attorney General, first General Counsel for the United States Department of Homeland Security, Adjunct Professor at the George Washington University Law School, former partner at Alston & Bird international law firm, present partner at Baker Donelson
- Robert Whitlow (J.D. 1979), North Carolina attorney, best-selling author, and filmmaker
- Melanie D. Wilson (J.D. 1990), Dean of Washington and Lee University School of Law
- Lisa Godbey Wood (J.D. 1990), Chief Judge, U.S. District Court
- William Robert Woodall III (J.D. 1997), member, U.S. House of Representatives
- Sally Quillian Yates (J.D. 1986), partner, international law firm King & Spalding, former faculty Georgetown University Law Center, former United States Deputy Attorney General and acting United States Attorney General
