= 1998 Georgia Secretary of State election =

- November 4, 1998
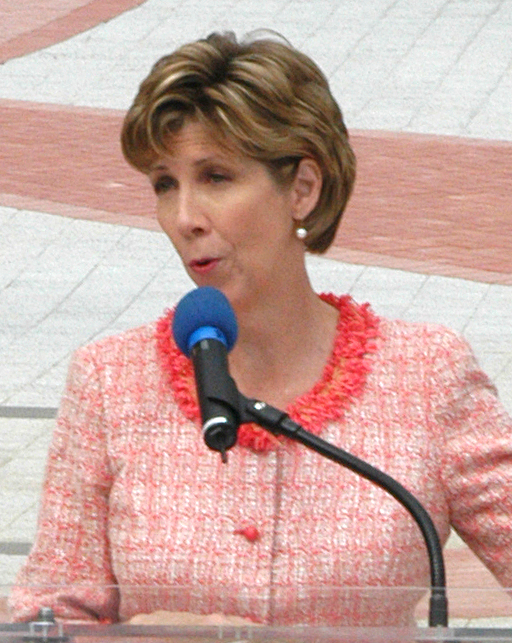

Nominee	Cathy Cox	John A. McCallum
Party	Democratic	Republican
Popular vote	983,905	703,941
Percentage	56.61%	40.50%
- County results Cox: 40–50% 50–60% 60–70% 70–80% 80–90% McCallum: 40–50% 50–60% 60–70%
Secretary of State before election
Lewis A. Massey
Democratic
Elected Secretary of State
Cathy Cox
Democratic

The 1998 Georgia Secretary of State election was held on November 4, 1998, to elect the Georgia Secretary of State. Democratic State Representative Cathy Cox ran for Georgia Secretary of State in 1998 and defeated Republican candidate John A. McCallum with 56.6% of the vote, becoming the 25th Secretary of State of Georgia and the first woman elected to the position.

== Democratic primary ==
=== Candidates ===
- Cathy Cox, Assistant Secretary of State, former state representative (1993–1996)

=== Campaign ===
Cox was unopposed in the Democratic primary.

=== Results ===
Democratic primary results
Party	Candidate	Votes	%
Democratic	Cathy Cox	352,615	100.0
Total votes		352,615	100.00

== Republican primary ==
=== Candidates ===
- Charlie Bailey
- John A. McCallum, businessperson

=== Campaign ===
Cleland was unopposed in the Democratic primary.

=== Results ===
Democratic primary results
Party	Candidate	Votes	%
Republican	Charlie Bailey	119,387	40.1%
Republican	John A. McCallum	178,180	59.9
Total votes		297,567	100.00%

== General election ==
1998 Secretary of State election, Georgia
Party	Candidate	Votes	%	
Democratic	Cathy Cox	983,905	56.6	
Republican	John A. McCallum	703,941	40.5	
Libertarian	Mark Antieau	50,281	2.9	
Total votes		2,025,861	100.00%	N/A
Democratic hold				
