= Alston & Bird =

Law firm

Alston & Bird LLP
- Headquarters: One Atlantic Center; Atlanta, Georgia, US
- No. of offices: 13
- No. of attorneys: 935
- No. of employees: 1,681
- Major practice areas: Corporate law, litigation, intellectual property, tax law
- Key people: Richard R. Hays (Chairman and Managing Partner)
- Revenue: $1.33 billion (2025)
- Profit per equity partner: $4,086,000 (2025)
- Date founded: 1893; 133 years ago
- Company type: LLP
- Website: alston.com

Alston & Bird LLP is an American multinational law firm with over 900 lawyers in 13 offices throughout the United States, Europe, and the UK. The firm provides legal services to both domestic and international clients who conduct business worldwide. Alston & Bird has advised companies including Amazon.com, The Coca-Cola Company, Microsoft, Bank of America, Starbucks, Toyota, Dell, UPS, and Nokia. Since 2000, Fortune has ranked the firm in the 100 Best Companies to Work For list. The firm's core practices include intellectual property, complex litigation, corporate and tax, with national industry focusing on energy and sustainability, health care, financial services, and public policy.

The firm is headquartered in Midtown Atlanta in One Atlantic Center, with offices in Atlanta, Brussels, Century City, Charlotte, Chicago, Dallas, London, Los Angeles, New York City, Raleigh, San Francisco, Silicon Valley, and Washington, D.C..

== History ==
The firm has roots dating back to 1893, with the modern firm being formed in 1982 through a merger of Alston, Miller & Gaines and Jones, Bird and Howell. In 1997, the firm merged with intellectual property-focused Bell Seltzer Park & Gibson (Charlotte and Raleigh). A merger with Walter, Conston, Alexander & Green occurred in 2001 (New York), and Crews, Shepherd & McCarty LLP in 2007 (Dallas).

In August 2008, the firm opened a Silicon Valley office, bringing in attorneys from the national firm Akin Gump Strauss Hauer & Feld. The next month, Alston & Bird acquired Weston Benshoof Rochefort Rubalcava and MacCuish LLP (which had a total of ~100 lawyers), launching in Los Angeles and Ventura County. In March 2017, the firm opened its San Francisco office. In September 2019, the firm opened its London office. In July 2024, the firm opened offices in Chicago and Century City with three partners joining from Sidley Austin.

== Compensation ==
In June 2016, Alston & Bird announced that it would raise attorney salaries to match market rates set earlier that month by the New York–based law firm Cravath, Swaine & Moore. Firm bonuses range from $15,000 to $100,000, depending on service years and merit-based reviews.

== Political contributions ==
According to OpenSecrets, Alston & Bird was one of the top law firms contributing to federal candidates during the 2012 election cycle, donating $1.26 million, 53% to Democrats. Since 1990, Alston & Bird contributed $5.1 million to federal campaigns.

The New York Times reported that a $1 million contribution was made through Alston & Bird to Project Veritas in 2019.

== Notable cases ==
- Counsel to German media group Bertelsmann AG (a longtime client of legacy firm Walter, Conston) with Clifford Chance and Slaughter & May as UK co-counsel in Bertelsmann's $2.74 billion acquisition of Zomba Music Group in 2002.
- Represented Cingular Wireless in its purchase of 34 wireless licenses from NextWave Media in 2003.
- Advised Regions Financial Corporation alongside Sullivan & Cromwell in its purchase of Union Planters Corporation in 2004, a transaction valued at $5.8 billion.
- Advised longstanding client IndyMac, its executives and directors during the FBI investigation into the California bank's collapse in 2008. Alston also advised the bank on the transfer of its assets to government control under the auspices of the Federal Deposit Insurance Corporation.
- Represented Toyota in the economic loss class actions arising from the 2009–2010 Toyota vehicle recalls.

== Notable attorneys ==
- Keith R. Blackwell, former justice of the Georgia Supreme Court and judge of the Georgia Court of Appeals
- B.J. Pak, former United States Attorney for the Northern District of Georgia from 2017 to 2021 and member of the Georgia House of Representatives from 2011 to 2017

== Notable alumni ==
- Philip H. Alston Jr., U.S. Ambassador to Australia and to Nauru, confidant of former U.S. President Jimmy Carter, and founder of Alston & Bird
- Chaz Beasley, member of the North Carolina House of Representatives
- Sean Bedford, former American football center for the Georgia Tech Yellow Jackets
- Michael Lawrence Brown, United States district judge of the United States District Court for the Northern District of Georgia
- Craig Carpenito, current United States Attorney for the District of New Jersey
- Christopher M. Carr, Attorney General of Georgia
- Tom Daschle, United States senator from South Dakota from 1987 to 2005.
- Bob Dole, former member of the U.S. House of Representatives and U.S. Senate from Kansas
- Daisy Hurst Floyd, former dean of Walter F. George School of Law of Mercer University
- Keith Gottfried, 19th General Counsel for the United States Department of Housing and Urban Development
- Jody Hunt, former assistant attorney general for the U.S. Department of Justice Civil Division from 2018 to 2020, and chief of staff to the United States attorney general from 2017 to 2018
- Bobby Jones, winner of the 1930 Grand Slam, founder of the Masters Tournament and Augusta National Golf Club, former Alston & Bird partner, as well as founding partner of one of Alston & Bird's predecessor firms (Jones, Bird, and Howell); the firm continues to represent the Bobby Jones brand and monitors trademark issues for the family
- Blanche Lincoln, former U.S. Senator from Arkansas
- Karol Mason, Assistant Attorney General under the Obama administration
- Robert McCallum Jr., former Associate Attorney General of the United States and former United States Deputy Attorney General
- Earl Pomeroy, former U.S. Representative for North Dakota's at-large congressional district
- Tom Scully, former senior official in the administrations of Presidents George H. W. Bush and George W. Bush
- Leah Ward Sears, former Chief Justice of the Supreme Court of Georgia
- Francis Shackelford, former General Counsel of the Army
- Frank E. Sheeder III, former President of the Health Care Compliance Association (HCCA)
- Peter Swire, Professor of Law at Scheller College of Business at the Georgia Institute of Technology
- Anne Tompkins, former United States Attorney for the United States District Court for the Western District of North Carolina
- Thomas Walker, former United States Attorney for the Eastern District of North Carolina
- Joe Whitley, the first General Counsel for the United States Department of Homeland Security
- Todd Zywicki, Professor of Law at George Mason University School of Law

== See also ==
- Timeline of investigations into Trump and Russia (2019)
- White shoe firms
- The Magic Circle
- List of law firms
