= Stacie I. Strong =

Legal academic

Stacie I. Strong (published as S.I. Strong) is the K.H. Gyr Professor of Private International Law at Emory University School of Law. An American attorney, English solicitor, legal academic, and specialist in international dispute resolution (including international arbitration, litigation, and conflict of laws), Strong is a former U.S Supreme Court Fellow who provided the initial impetus for the creation of the Singapore Mediation Convention.

== Education and early legal career ==
Strong received a bachelor's degree cum laude from the University of California, Davis, a master's degree in professional writing from the University of Southern California, a J.D. degree from Duke University School of Law, a Ph.D. in law from the University of Cambridge, and a D.Phil. ad eundem from the University of Oxford. While at Duke, Strong served as Editor in Chief of the Duke Journal of Comparative and International Law. Strong's doctoral dissertation at Cambridge was awarded the Yorke Prize by the University of Cambridge for being "of exceptional quality" and "mak[ing] a substantial contribution to its relevant field of legal knowledge" and was subsequently published by Cambridge University Press.

Strong practiced law as a U.S-qualified attorney and English-qualified solicitor at the New York and London offices of Weil, Gotshal & Manges before being named counsel at Baker McKenzie. While in practice, Strong acted as advocate in U.S. state and federal courts, English courts and international arbitral tribunals. Strong has also acted as a sole, presiding and party-appointed arbitrator and mediator and as an expert witness in court and international arbitration.

== Academic career ==
Strong began teaching at the University of Cambridge, acting as a supervisor in law at New Hall (now Murray Edwards College), before moving to the University of Oxford to become a Lecturer in Law first at St John's College and then at Exeter College. Strong has also taught full-time as the Manley O. Hudson Professor of Law at the University of Missouri School of Law, Professor of Comparative and Private International Law at the University of Sydney Law School and K.H. Gyr Professor of Private International Law at Emory University School of Law. Since 2013, she has also served as an adjunct professor at Georgetown University Law Center.

Strong has won numerous awards for her scholarship, including an unprecedented four awards from the International Institute for Conflict Prevention & Resolution (CPR Institute). Other awards include the American Bar Association Dispute Resolution Section Award for Outstanding Scholarly Work for her career body of work, the Australian ADR Academic of the Year award, the Global Legal Skills Book Award, and the Yorke Prize from the University of Cambridge. She is considered a leader in a number of different aspects of international dispute resolution, including large scale (class, mass and collective) arbitration and the newly emergent field of trust arbitration.

Strong has published over 130 books, chapters, and articles in leading outlets from around the world, including Cambridge University Press, Oxford University Press, the American Journal of Comparative Law, the American Journal of International Law (AJIL) Unbound, and the Australian Year Book of International Law. Her work has been translated into Chinese, French, Russian, and Spanish. Strong's scholarship has been explicitly relied upon by international arbitral tribunals in majority and dissenting awards concerning jurisdiction and admissibility of large-scale (mass) claims in investor-state arbitration and by numerous courts, including the U.S. Court of Appeals for the Third Circuit (concerning commercial trusts), the U.S. Court of Appeals for the Seventh Circuit (concerning international commercial arbitration and class actions), the U.S. Court of Appeals for the Eleventh Circuit (concerning jurisdictional discovery), the California Court of Appeal (concerning trust arbitration), the Ohio Court of Appeal (concerning trust arbitration), and various U.S. federal district courts. Counsel has also relied on Strong's research as authority in amicus and party briefs submitted to various apex courts, including the U.S. Supreme Court (concerning class arbitration, international commercial arbitration, and jurisdictional discovery) and the Texas Supreme Court (concerning trust arbitration). Judges such as the Right Honourable Baroness Carr of Walton-on-the-Hill, Lady Chief Justice of England and Wales, have also referred to Strong's research in their extrajudicial remarks.

== Policy work ==
Strong has engaged in policy work at the governmental, non-governmental, and inter-governmental levels. She is best known for her work on the Singapore Mediation Convention, having proposed the initial idea for the convention at a public meeting of the U.S. State Department's Advisory Committee on Private International Law. The U.S. State Department embraced the idea and shortly afterward submitted a formal proposal to the United Nations Commission on International Trade Law (UNCITRAL) for a new international instrument on settlement agreements arising out of mediation. Strong attended deliberations at UNCITRAL as a representative of the American Society of International Law, an accredited non-governmental organization (NGO). In addition to making interventions from the floor of the United Nations, Strong conducted an empirical study on the status and use of international commercial mediation that was circulated to delegates by the UNCITRAL Secretariat to assist with deliberations. Findings from that study were subsequently published in the Washington and Lee Law Review. Strong continues to assist UNCITRAL with various initiatives and has been appointed by the U.S. State Department as a U.S. national reporter for UNCITRAL's CLOUT (Case Law on UNCITRAL Texts) project. Strong also serves as an appointed member of the U.S. State Department's Advisory Committee on Private International Law.

Strong has also worked in the area of judicial education. She was commissioned by the Federal Judicial Center to write a benchbook for U.S. federal judges on international commercial arbitration. That text was subsequently relied upon as authority by the U.S. District Court for the Southern District of California and the U.S. District Court for the Southern District of New York. Strong later worked at the Center for a year as part of her fellowship with the U.S. Supreme Court.

Over the years, Strong has also provided expert assistance to the Organization of American States, the Uniform Law Commission, and the United Kingdom Ministry of Justice. Strong has worked on a variety of policy initiatives promulgated by arbitral institutions, including the International Institute for Conflict Prevention & Resolution (CPR Institute) and the Council of the International Chamber of Commerce. Strong also assists with policy work through her memberships with the American Law Institute and the European Law Institute.
