= Glen Ashman =

Glen Edward Ashman (February 7, 1956 - August 17, 2018) in New York City, New York) was a lawyer who served as a judge in the Municipal Court of East Point, Georgia beginning in 1988. He was last reappointed on July 2, 2007. The East Point City Court is one of the state's busier municipal courts, handling traffic, housing code, East Point City ordinance and other criminal cases.

== Education ==
Ashman received his B.A. from Emory University and his Juris doctor cum laude from Walter F. George School of Law at Mercer University, where he was on the Mercer Law Review. He was admitted to practice law in Georgia in 1980.

== Law practice ==
Ashman had a general civil practice in the Atlanta area, including divorce, adoption, bankruptcy, wills, and personal injury.

== Books and articles ==
Ashman was the author of the Georgia Municipal Judges Benchbook. The benchbook is published by the Institute of Continuing Legal Education in Georgia (ICJE) and the Georgia Council of Municipal Court Judges].

Ashman also authored Random Searches at Public Concert Held Fourth Amendment Violation in the Mercer Law Review, Volume 30, Page 1093 (1979).

== Online forums and blogs ==
Ashman was a long-time participant in the online world, hosting forums on Delphi Forums. His personal law forum was started in the mid-1990s. In 2002, he served as a member of the Executive Council for Delphi Forums.

== The Kudzu Case ==
One of Judge Ashman's more notable dealt with how appellate courts handle appeals of Constitutional issues from local courts. Russell v. City of East Point, 261 Ga. 213, 403 SE2d 50 (1991), Locally, it is more commonly known as the kudzu case, and dealt with an attorney's home being overgrown with the weed. The constitutional issue was whether a right to a jury trial applies in a local ordinance case in which the court has held that there is no possibility of incarceration.
