= There's Cake in My Future =

2010 romantic comedy novel by Kim Gruenenfelder

- First edition
- Author: Kim Gruenenfelder
- Series: There's Cake in My Future (series)
- Genre: Romantic comedy, chick lit
- Publisher: St. Martin's Press
- Publication date: December 21, 2010
- Pages: 360
- ISBN: 0312614594
- Followed by: Keep Calm and Carry a Big Drink

There's Cake in My Future is a 2010 romantic comedy novel by Kim Gruenenfelder. Expanding upon the chick lit style that defined her bestseller A Total Waste of Makeup, the novel follows the lives of three friends Nic, Mel, and Seema after a future-changing cake pull. The series continues with the same characters after their fortunes have changed, with the sequel Keep Calm and Carry a Big Drink published in 2013.

== Reception ==
Labeling the book a "gimmicky romp," Kirkus Reviews lauded the book for highlighting female characters who are "smart, likable and good to each other," though it criticized Gruenenfelder's use of one-liners.
