= J. Kenneth Campbell =

American actor

- Born: New York City, New York, U.S.
- Education: Cheshire Academy; University of Arizona
- Occupation: Actor
- Years active: 1970–present
- Father: James Kenneth Campbell
- Relatives: Eugene Campbell (grandfather); Clay Clement (great-uncle); Kim Gruenenfelder (niece); Emma Rosenblum (niece)
- Military career
- Allegiance: United States
- Branch: United States Marine Corps
- Conflicts: Vietnam War
- Awards: Purple Heart

James Kenneth Campbell II is an American film, stage, and television actor who has been cast in over 80 roles. He was born in Flushing, New York. Campbell studied acting under theatrical fight director Patrick Crean, and was an acting instructor himself at the Stratford Shakespeare Festival.

== Early life ==
Campbell was born in Flushing, Queens to Dorothea Burke and lawyer James Kenneth Campbell. The second of seven children, Campbell was raised on Long Island and graduated from Cheshire Academy.

Campbell began his studies at the University of Arizona, but left to study under Sanford Meisner. Having been drafted into the United States Army in 1967, Campbell enlisted in the United States Marine Corps. Wounded in action during the Vietnam War, Campbell was awarded a Purple Heart and honorably discharged.

== Career ==
=== Television ===
Campbell has made several appearances in television shows, made-for-TV movies, miniseries, and specials. Campbell appeared on the daytime soap operas: The Edge of Night, Another World and Search for Tomorrow in the 1980s. He also had guest appearances on several popular TV series through the years as well, including: The Mod Squad, The Rookies and Baa Baa Black Sheep in the 1970s. In the 1980s, he appeared in Spenser: For Hire, Matlock and Cheers. The 1990s saw him appearing in popular series L.A. Law, Touched by an Angel, Melrose Place, and Walker, Texas Ranger. Then in the 2000s, he landed guest roles in Diagnosis: Murder, Charmed and Frasier.

=== Stage ===
On stage, Campbell played the Viscount de Valvert in the 1973 musical Cyrano, and appeared in The Philadelphia Story, which ran from 1980 to 1981 at the Vivian Beaumont Theater. In 1981 he starred as Macduff in the Broadway revival of William Shakespeare's Macbeth at the Vivian Beaumont Theater, alongside Philip Anglim, Maureen Anderman, and Kelsey Grammer. He starred as King Henry VIII in A Man for All Seasons alongside Charlton Heston in 1986 and 1987, at the Union Square Theatre, as part of the Roundabout Theatre Company. His Broadway credits included The Boys of Winter (1985), The Caine Mutiny Court-Martial (1983), The Philadelphia Story (1908), The Freedom of the City (1974), and Cyrano (1973).

In 2017, Campbell portrayed President Lyndon Baines Johnson in an Actors' Playhouse production of All the Way in Miami.

== Personal life ==
Campbell is a grandnephew of Clay Clement, an actor who was one of the earliest members of the Screen Actors Guild, and the grandson of The Long Whip author Eugene Campbell. Campbell's niece through his sister Carol is author Kim Gruenenfelder, and his niece through his sister Barbara is media executive Emma Rosenblum.

== Filmography ==
Feature Films
Year	Title	Role	Notes
1970	The Mod Squad	Sooey	1 episode
1973	The Rookies	Dude	1 episode
1977	Wonder Woman	Taft	1 episode
1977	Black Sheep Squadron	Commander Billings	1 episode
1978	Cops and Robin	Detective Furie	TV Movie
1978	Lou Grant	Jones	1 episode
1978	Crash		TV movie
1979	Love and Bullets	Newscaster	Uncredited
1980	The Changeling	Security Guard	
1981	Macbeth	Macduff	TV movie
1983	Chiefs	Dr. Tom Manton	2 episodes; as Kenneth Campbell
1983	Kennedy	Secret Service Man	5 episodes; as Kenneth Campbell
1984	George Washington	Richard Henry Lee	1 episode
1984	The Edge of Night	Russ Powell	20 episodes
1985	Sudden Death	Kosakowski	
1985	Search for Tomorrow	Roy Arnold	195 episodes
1986	American Playhouse	Walter Ralegh	1 episode
1980–1986	Another World	Herman Ludwig / Jordan Scott	45 episodes
1986	Spenser: For Hire	Deputy Hagen	1 episode
1986	Perry Mason: The Case of the Shooting Star	Ray Anderson	TV movie
1987	The Survivalist (Note: Also known as Jack Tillman: The Survivalist)	President's Spokesman	
1987	Mr. President		1 episode
1987	Dear America: Letters Home from Vietnam	(voice)	
1988	Buck James	Morgan Woolwine	1 episode
1988	Waxwork	Marquis de Sade	
1988	Deadline: Madrid	Paul Johnson	TV movie
1988	Favorite Son	Thomas	1 episode
1988	War and Remembrance	Cmdr. Hoban (Devilfish)	1 episode
1988	China Beach	Colonel Wadsworth	1 episode
1988	Cheers	Bob Speakes	1 episode
1989	The Abyss	DeMarco	
1989	An Innocent Man	Lieutenant Freebery	
1989	The Young Riders	Indian Agent Walker	1 episode
1990	Drug Wars: The Camarena Story	Stephen Matson	3 episodes
1990	The Last of the Finest (Note: Also known as Blue Heat and Street Legal)	Calvert	
1990	Johnny Ryan	D.A. Frank Hogan	TV movie
1990	L.A. Law	Judge Walter Stone	2 episodes
1990	The Great Los Angeles Earthquake	Todd Harris	TV movie
1991	Flight of the Intruder	Lieutenant Commander 'Cowboy' Parker	
1991	Murder 101	Tim Ryder	TV movie
1991	Lifestories	Coach Staggerhorn	1 episode
1991	P.S. I Luv U	Jack Hanson	1 episode
1992	Stop! Or My Mom Will Shoot	Ross	
1992	Jake and the Fatman	Tom Chetwin	1 episode
1992	Interceptor	Engineer	
1993	The Legend of Prince Valiant	Assassin (voice)	1 episode
1993	Deadfall	Huey	
1994	Cosmic Slop	segment: The First Commandment	TV movie
1994	Cobb	Professor Cobb	
1988–1995	Matlock	Agt. Ed Wingate / Scott Walker / Jack Berlin	5 episodes
1994–1995	Renegade	Sheriff / D.A. Dennis Piaza	2 episodes
1996	Picket Fences	Jonathan Braun	1 episode
1996	High Tide	Kinkaid	1 episode
1996	Mars Attacks!	Doctor	
1997	Turbulence	Captain Matt Powell	
1997	Ulee's Gold	Sheriff Bill Floyd	
1997	Touched by an Angel	Cotton	1 episode
1997	Night Man	Dr. Gerard Parker	1 episode
1997	Operation Delta Force 2: Mayday	Flint Lukash	TV movie
1998	Pensacola: Wings of Gold	Sheriff Hawkins	1 episode
1998	Ally McBeal	Donald Yorkin	1 episode
1998	Beyond Belief: Fact or Fiction	Officer Craig Hoffman	1 episode; segment "The Wall"
1998	Bulworth	Anthony	
1998	Seven Days	Colonel Vickery	2 episodes
1998	Melrose Place	Sheriff Spencer	1 episode
1997–1999	The Journey of Allen Strange	Shaw	2 episodes
1999	Michael Landon, the Father I Knew	Andy Glennon	TV movie
1999	Blue Streak (Note: Also known as Der Diamanten–Cop)	FBI Section Commander Peterson	
1999	Walker, Texas Ranger	Roger Woodson	1 episode
1999	Sonic Impact	Pilot Tom Rush	
2000	U.S. Seals	Cane Whitlock / Rusty 'Blaise'	
2000	Charmed	Elias Lundy	1 episode
2000	Angel	Angel's Father	1 episode
2000	Diagnosis: Murder	Col. Lucian Chandler	1 episode
2001	Tomcats	Mr. MacDonald	
2001	The Huntress	Rango Burke	3 episodes
2001	Free	James Jenkins	
2002	Collateral Damage	Ed Coonts	
2003	Straight from the Heart	Howard Jamison	TV movie
2003	Frasier	Mr. Michaels	1 episode
2003	The Guardian	Mr. Lightstone	1 episode
2003	Threat Matrix		1 episode
2005	Guess Who	Nathan Rogers	
2005	Commander in Chief	The Admiral	1 episode
2008	The Butcher's Daughter	Richard Beaumont	Short film
2008	Denial, Anger, Bargaining, Depression, Acceptance	Walter	Short film
2009	The Only Good Indian	McCoy	
2010	The Whole Truth	Larry Combs	1 episode
2013	Bluebird	Deputy	
