= James Kenneth Campbell (lawyer) =

American lawyer

Village Justice of Saltaire, New York

Trustee of the Saltaire Board of Trustees

Personal details
- Born: James Kenneth Campbell; September 24, 1920
- Died: March 30, 2004 (aged 83)
- Resting place: Brooklyn, New York, US
- Party: Democratic
- Spouse: Dorothea Burke (m. 1944; died 1995)
- Children: 7, including J. Kenneth Campbell
- Parent: Eugene Campbell (father)
- Relatives: Clay Clement (uncle); Kim Gruenenfelder (granddaughter); Emma Rosenblum (granddaughter)
- Education: Fordham University (BA, JD)
- Occupation: Senior partner, Alexander and Green
- Known for: Deinstitutionalization in the United States

Military service
- Branch/service: United States Army Air Corps
- Rank: Lieutenant
- Battles/wars: World War II

James Kenneth Campbell Sr. (September 24, 1920 – March 30, 2004) was an American lawyer who advocated for legal reform regarding the rights of mentally ill defendants and prisoners, served as the longtime Village Justice of Saltaire, New York, and argued twice before the Supreme Court of the United States.

== Early life and education ==
James Kenneth Campbell was born on September 24, 1920, in New York. His father was Eugene Campbell, who served as the Secretary of New York State Racing Commission until 1945 and authored the 1934 "riches to rags" novel The Long Whip. Campbell's uncle was actor Clay Clement, one of the founders of the Screen Actors Guild.

Campbell received his Bachelor of Arts and Juris Doctor from Fordham University. During his time at Fordham University School of Law, Campbell took a leave of absence to serve as a lieutenant in the United States Army Air Corps during World War II.

== Legal career ==
Campbell was predominantly known in his lifetime as a high-powered attorney in national legal circles, including serving as one of a mining company's attorneys in the Supreme Court case United States v. Central Eureka Mining Co. He was a senior partner at the white shoe New York City law firm of Alexander and Green.

His personal passion for ending the culture of abuse and poor conditions at insane asylums led him to pursue changes in relevant New York laws. Conditions both inside and beyond New York state were abysmal, with reports of restraint, starvation, and beatings commonplace. As such, Campbell became an advocate in the courts and in government for increasing the civil rights of mental patients. He chaired a Special Committee on the Study of Commitment Procedures and the Law Relating to Incompetents as part of the Association of the Bar of the City of New York, which published its findings in 1968 as Mental Illness, Due Process and the Criminal Defendant: A Second Report and Additional Recommendations.

Though Campbell was a Democrat, he was an ally of New York Governor Nelson Rockefeller. At the governor's behest, he authored a bill for the New York State Legislature on the topic of reforming the state's psychiatric institutions, which was subsequently passed and signed by Governor Rockefeller. In the years since, deinstitutionalization in New York has been hotly debated, with advocates praising it as a civil rights approach and critics arguing that it increased rates of homelessness.

== Personal life ==
Campbell was married to Dorothea Burke from 1944 until her death in 1995, and they long resided both in Delray Beach, Florida and in the Village of Saltaire, New York. Before permanently relocating to Saltaire, the couple raised a family on Long Island. Campbell and Burke had seven children together, including actor J. Kenneth Campbell. At the time of his passing, Campbell had fifteen grandchildren and three great-grandchildren.

=== Death ===
Campbell died at the age of eighty-three on March 30, 2004, at a New York retirement home. The cause of death was declared "a tragic fire." After funeral services at Frank E. Campbell Funeral Chapel, he was buried at the Campbell family plot at Holy Cross Cemetery in Brooklyn.

== Legacy ==
Following in Campbell's footsteps, his son-in-law Scott S. Rosenblum served on the Saltaire Board of Trustees for decades. He would famously serve as Saltaire's mayor in the 2000s, during a heavily divided time in the community.

Two of Campbell's granddaughters, Kim Gruenenfelder and Emma Rosenblum, grew up visiting Fire Island and became writers. Rosenblum's debut novel Bad Summer People (2023) generated controversy in Fire Island and Saltaire for its satirical depiction of local life.

Campbell's greatest accomplishment outside of Saltaire, the role that he played in New York's deinstitutionalization, has also been debated. In the 2020s, politicians including New York City Mayor Eric Adams and New York Governor Kathy Hochul began suggesting a move toward institutionalizing the mentally ill once again, in response to perceived increases in violent crime related to mental illness. Critics of this approach note that overall major crime rates have fallen in New York City in recent years, while pointing to the history of failures in forced mental treatment.
