= Catherine Cox =

Catherine Cox may refer to:

- Catherine Cox (actress)
- Catherine Cox (netball) (born 1976)

== See also ==
- Catharine Cox Miles
- Cathy Cox (disambiguation)
- Catherine Coxe House
- Kathy Cox (disambiguation)
- Katherine Cox (disambiguation)
