= Michael Sabbath =

American lawyer

Michael Sabbath is an American lawyer, currently the Southeastern Bankruptcy Law Institute-Homer Drake, Jr. Endowed Chair in Bankruptcy Law at Walter F. George School of Law, Mercer University.
