= Eugene Campbell =

Eugene Campbell may refer to:

- Eugene Campbell (author), American author of The Long Whip
- Gene Campbell (Eugene Edward Campbell, 1932–2013), American ice hockey player
- Eugene E. Campbell (1915–1986), American professor of history
