= Daisy Hurst Floyd =

American lawyer

Dean of the Walter F. George School of Law
- In office February 28, 2014 – June 30, 2017
- Preceded by: Gary J. Simson
- Succeeded by: Cathy Cox
- In office July 1, 2004 – June 30, 2010
- Preceded by: Michael Sabbath (acting)
- Succeeded by: Gary J. Simson

Personal details
- Born: July 9, 1956 (age 69) Atlanta, Georgia, U.S.
- Spouse: Tim Floyd
- Children: 2
- Education: Emory University (BA, MA); University of Georgia (JD)

Daisy Hurst Floyd (born July 9, 1956) is an American lawyer, law professor, and law school dean. She served as dean of the Walter F. George School of Law of Mercer University twice (2004-2010 and 2014-2017).

== Early life and education ==
Floyd attended Randolph-Macon Woman's College from 1973-75. She then earned a bachelor's degree, summa cum laude, and a master's degree in political science, both from Emory University in 1977. Floyd earned her J.D. degree from the University of Georgia School of Law in 1980.

== Early career ==
Early in her career, Floyd worked as the director of the legal research and writing program at the University of Georgia School of Law. She also worked as an attorney for the global law firm of Alston, Miller & Gaines, now known as Alston & Bird.

== Academic career ==
Floyd served as a professor at the Texas Tech University School of Law from 1990-04. She then served as dean of the Walter F. George School of Law of Mercer University from 2004–10; she was reappointed as dean in 2014 when her successor accepted another position with the university. Floyd served as a senior professor at Mercer following her first term as dean including as University Professor of Law and Ethical Formation, and agreed to again serve as dean until a replacement was selected.

== Possible judicial nomination ==
On February 28, 2011, The Atlanta Journal-Constitution reported Floyd was under consideration for nomination to the United States Court of Appeals for the Eleventh Circuit; the court had a vacancy due to the retirement of Judge Stanley F. Birch Jr. Floyd was not nominated and maintained her position as a law professor at Mercer.

== Personal ==
Floyd's husband, Tim Floyd, is also a law professor at Mercer. They have two children.
