= Macbeth (1981 film) =

1981 adaption of Macbeth by Kirk Browning

- Directed by: Kirk Browning
- Based on: Macbeth by William Shakespeare
- Produced by: Richmond Crinkley
- Starring: Philip Anglim; Maureen Anderman; J. Kenneth Campbell; John Vickery
- Music by: Edward Barnes
- Release date: December 6, 1981
- Running time: 179 Minutes
- Country: United States
- Language: English

Macbeth is a 1981 television film consisting of a recording of the stage play at the Vivian Beaumont Theater and shown on the ARTS cable network. Philip Anglim plays Macbeth and Maureen Anderman plays Lady Macbeth. The stage play was directed by Sarah Caldwell while Kirk Browning directed the film. The original production played from January 23, 1981, to March 8, 1981.

== Cast ==
- Philip Anglim as Macbeth
- Maureen Anderman as Lady Macbeth
- J. Kenneth Campbell as Macduff
- John Vickery as Malcolm
