= Keep Calm and Carry a Big Drink =

2013 romantic comedy novel by Kim Gruenenfelder

- First edition
- Author: Kim Gruenenfelder
- Series: There's Cake in My Future (series)
- Genre: Romantic comedy, chick lit
- Publisher: St. Martin's Press
- Publication date: December 24, 2013
- Pages: 384
- ISBN: 1250005043
- Preceded by: There's Cake in My Future

Keep Calm and Carry a Big Drink is a 2013 romantic comedy novel by Kim Gruenenfelder. A sequel to 2010's There's Cake in My Future, the novel follows the lives of three friends Nic, Mel, and Seema nearly a year after their future-defining cake pull. Though Nic attempts to rig another cake pull before Seema's Indian wedding, a bridal shower mishap leads to fortunes being very different from what the friends may have envisioned.

== Reception ==
The book received generally favorable reviews from critics and audiences. In an article for PopSugar, the novel was described as author Beth Kendrick's favorite book of 2014, praised as "a fun, fresh story about love, life changes, and friendships that endure through all the craziness." Kirkus Reviews gave the book an overall positive review, writing, "Although the humor can be forced and crude, Gruenenfelder’s characters are charismatic, entertaining and distinctive."
