= Walter, Conston, Alexander & Green =

American law firm (1843–2001)

- Headquarters: New York City
- No. of attorneys: 54
- Key people: Otto Walter, Henry Conston, William Shurtman
- Date founded: 1843
- Company type: PC
- Dissolved: 2001
- Website: www.wcag.com

Walter, Conston, Alexander & Green (officially Walter, Conston, Alexander & Green, P.C.) was an American mid-sized full-service white-shoe law firm that was founded in 1843. Based in New York City, it merged with Atlanta-based Alston & Bird in 2001 to launch the New York office of the latter firm.

== History ==
Founded in 1843, Alexander & Green was a white-shoe firm that was one of the first such historically Protestant institutions to accept Catholic attorneys and graduates from non-Ivy League law schools. The firm represented Charles L. Webster and Company, founded by Mark Twain, from 1885 to 1890.

Notable attorneys at Alexander & Green included law clerks John Woodruff Simpson, Thomas Thacher, and partner James Kenneth Campbell, who argued twice before the U.S. Supreme Court. Simpson, Thacher, and fellow law clerk William M. Barnum went on to found Simpson Thacher & Bartlett in 1884.

Walter, Conston & Schurtman was established in 1955 by Otto Walter. Walter was a German-born Jew, who was prohibited from practicing law after graduation due to antisemitic policies in Nazi Germany. He subsequently fled to the United States and studied at New York Law School. Following World War II, Walter advised the German Ministry of Finance on various taxation and legal issues, and his work for German-American reconciliation led to him receiving two Orders of Merit of the Federal Republic of Germany. His firm went on to establish a strong practice in Germany, Austria, and Switzerland, with a roster of blue chip German clients including Bertelsmann and Beiersdorf. With more than four dozen attorneys in its New York headquarters, Walter, Conston & Schurtman also had branch offices in Darien, Connecticut and Munich.

Alexander & Green and Walter, Conston & Schurtman merged to form Walter, Conston, Alexander & Green in 1987. The firm subsequently merged with Alston & Bird in 2001, maintaining the name of its New York office for some time during the 2000s.
