= Cathy Cox =

Cathy Cox may refer to:

- Cathy Cox (American politician) (born 1958)
- Cathy Cox (Canadian politician)

== See also ==
- Catherine Cox (disambiguation)
- Kathy Cox (disambiguation)
