= Emma Rosenblum =

American media executive and writer

- Occupations: Novelist and journalist
- Works: Bad Summer People
- Parents: Scott S. Rosenblum (father); Barbara Rosenblum (mother)
- Relatives: J. Kenneth Campbell (uncle); James Kenneth Campbell (grandfather); Kim Gruenenfelder (cousin)

Emma Rosenblum is a novelist and journalist who is the former chief content officer of Bustle Digital Group. Her debut novel, Bad Summer People, was published by Flatiron Books in 2023.

== Early life ==
Rosenblum grew up in New York, the daughter of Barbara Rosenblum (née Campbell) and lawyer Scott S. Rosenblum. Her father Scott served as Mayor of Saltaire, New York, where he spent decades on the town Board of Trustees. Her grandfather James Kenneth Campbell was the Village Justice of Saltaire, and her uncle J. Kenneth Campbell was a Broadway theatre actor.

== Career ==
Rosenblum started her career in editorial roles at Glamour, New York Magazine, and Bloomberg Businessweek, and was tapped to be executive editor of Elle in 2017. In 2019, Rosenblum joined Bustle as editor in chief and became chief content officer of Bustle Digital Group in 2021, where she was responsible for a portfolio of brands such as Nylon and W Magazine.

Rosenblum published her first novel, Bad Summer People, in 2023. She drew inspiration from The White Lotus and Succession, as well as the town of Saltaire, New York, a small Fire Island community where Rosenblum spent her childhood summers.

== Bibliography ==
- Bad Summer People (2023)
- Very Bad Company (2024)
- Mean Moms: A Novel (2025)
