= Katherine Cox =

Katherine Cox may refer to:

- Katherine Garrett-Cox (born 1967), British business executive
- Katherine Laird Cox (1887–1938), British socialist feminist

== See also ==
- Catherine Cox (disambiguation)
- Kathy Cox (disambiguation)
