= Love The Wine You're With =

2017 romantic comedy novel by Kim Gruenenfelder

- First edition
- Author: Kim Gruenenfelder
- Genre: Romantic comedy, chick lit
- Publisher: St. Martin's Press
- Publication date: June 13, 2017
- Pages: 384
- ISBN: 9781250066749

Love The Wine You're With is a 2017 romantic comedy novel by American writer Kim Gruenenfelder. The book follows three friends who decide to open a wine bar in the Echo Park neighborhood of Los Angeles.

== Release ==
Love The Wine You're With was released on June 13, 2017. To promote the book, Gruenenfelder embarked on a wine-paired book tour that took her from Vroman's Bookstore in California to Ohio and Pennsylvania.

== Reception ==
The novel received generally favorable reviews from critics and audiences. The book critic for the Pittsburgh Post-Gazette noted that he rarely reads chick lit, but praised Gruenenfelder for writing "a refreshing summer cocktail of a book." The Public Library Podcast described the book as "extremely relatable for women," and praised Gruenenfelder for accurately capturing midlife crises and connecting to her fans.
