= Misery Loves Cabernet =

2009 chick lit novel by Kim Gruenenfelder

- First edition
- Author: Kim Gruenenfelder
- Series: Charlize (series)
- Genre: Chick lit
- Publisher: St. Martin's Press
- Publication date: April 14, 2009
- Pages: 368
- ISBN: 0312348754
- Preceded by: A Total Waste of Makeup

Misery Loves Cabernet is a 2009 chick lit novel by Kim Gruenenfelder. A sequel to 2005's critically acclaimed international bestseller A Total Waste of Makeup, the book continues the adventures of Los Angeles personal assistant Charlize "Charlie" Edwards and her friends. Library Journal credited Gruenenfelder for her "well-written characters" and "wicked sense of humor," as well as for capturing the Hollywood scene accurately through her background as a screenwriter.

== Reception ==
The book received generally favorable reviews from critics and audiences. Lauded by Romantic Times as "delightfully funny", the Chicago Sun-Times praised the book as "a sweet tale of the Hollywood dating scene." The novel also received praise from authors MaryJanice Davidson and Cecelia Ahern.
