= Singapore Mediation Convention =

United Nations Convention on Mediation

Singapore Convention on Mediation
United Nations Convention on International Settlement Agreements Resulting from Mediation
- States that signed the convention (yellow)
- Signed: 7 August 2019 (first signatories)
- Location: Singapore
- Sealed: 20 December 2018 (adopted by the UN)
- Effective: 12 September 2020
- Condition: 6 months after the deposit of the third instrument of ratification, acceptance, approval or accession
- Signatories: 57
- Parties: 11
- Depositary: Secretary-General of the United Nations
- Languages: Arabic, Chinese, English, French, Russian, and Spanish

The Singapore Convention on Mediation, formally the United Nations Convention on International Settlement Agreements Resulting from Mediation is an international agreement which provides a uniform and efficient framework for the recognition and enforcement of mediated settlement agreements that resolve international, commercial disputes - akin to the framework that the 1958 New York Convention provides for arbitral awards. It was adopted on 20 December 2018 by the UN General Assembly and opened for signature on 7 August 2019. The Convention entered into force on 12 September 2020, that is, six months after the deposit of the third ratification instrument by Qatar, the first two being Singapore and Fiji.

== Background ==
The impetus for the Singapore Convention on Mediation arose at the February 2014 public meeting of the U.S. State Department's Advisory Committee on Public International Law, when Professor S.I. Strong suggested work on a convention concerning the international enforcement of mediation and settlement agreements. In June 2014, the United States - led by U.S. State Department Attorney-Advisor Timothy Schnabel - submitted a proposal to the United Nations Commission on International Trade Law (UNCITRAL) concerning a new instrument involving enforcement of settlement agreements arising out of mediation. The Commission referred the matter to UNCITRAL Working Group II, and deliberations ensued. The text was finalized by UNCITRAL on June 25, 2018, and adopted by the U.N. General Assembly on December 20, 2018.

The Singapore Convention on Mediation opened for signature on August 7, 2019, and saw a record 46 countries, including both the United States and China, sign on opening day.

== List of States Signatory to the Convention ==
As of 19 April 2024, 57 states have signed the convention and 12 states have deposited their respective instruments of ratification or approval.

Country	signature	ratification	entry into force
Afghanistan	7 August 2019	-	-
Armenia	26 September 2019	-	-
Australia	10 September 2021	-	-
Belarus	7 August 2019	15 July 2020	15 January 2021
Benin	7 August 2019	-	-
Belize	7 August 2019	-	-
Brunei	7 August 2019	-	-
Chad	26 September 2019	-	-
Chile	7 August 2019	-	-
China	7 August 2019	-	-
Colombia	7 August 2019	-	-
Republic of the Congo	7 August 2019	-	-
Democratic Republic of the Congo	7 August 2019	-	-
Ecuador	25 September 2019	9 September 2020	9 March 2021
Kingdom of Eswatini	7 August 2019	-	-
Fiji	7 August 2019	25 February 2020	12 September 2020
Gabon	25 September 2019	-	-
Georgia	7 August 2019	29 December 2021	29 June 2022
Ghana	22 July 2020	-	-
Grenada	7 August 2019	-	-
Guinea-Bissau	26 September 2019	-	-
Haiti	7 August 2019	-	-
Honduras	7 August 2019	2 September 2021	2 March 2022
India	7 August 2019	-	-
Iran	7 August 2019	-	-
Iraq	17 April 2024	-	-
Israel	7 August 2019	-	-
Jamaica	7 August 2019	-	-
Jordan	7 August 2019	-	-
Kazakhstan	7 August 2019	23 May 2022	23 November 2023
Laos	7 August 2019	-	-
Malaysia	7 August 2019	-	-
Maldives	7 August 2019	-	-
Mauritius	7 August 2019	-	-
Montenegro	7 August 2019	-	-
Nigeria	7 August 2019	-	-
North Macedonia	7 August 2019	-	-
Palau	7 August 2019	-	-
Paraguay	7 August 2019	-	-
Philippines	7 August 2019	-	-
Qatar	7 August 2019	12 March 2020	12 September 2020
South Korea	7 August 2019	-	-
Rwanda	28 January 2020		
Samoa	7 August 2019	-	-
Saudi Arabia	7 August 2019	5 May 2020	5 November 2020
Serbia	7 August 2019	-	-
Sierra Leone	7 August 2019	-	-
Singapore	7 August 2019	25 February 2020	12 September 2020
Sri Lanka	7 August 2019	28 February 2024	28 August 2024
Timor Leste	7 August 2019	-	-
Turkey	7 August 2019	11 October 2021	11 April 2022
Uganda	7 August 2019	-	-
Ukraine	7 August 2019	-	-
United Kingdom	3 May 2023	-	-
United States of America	7 August 2019	-	-
Uruguay	7 August 2019	28 March 2023	28 September 2023
Venezuela	7 August 2019	-	-
