= Kim Gruenenfelder =

American author and screenwriter

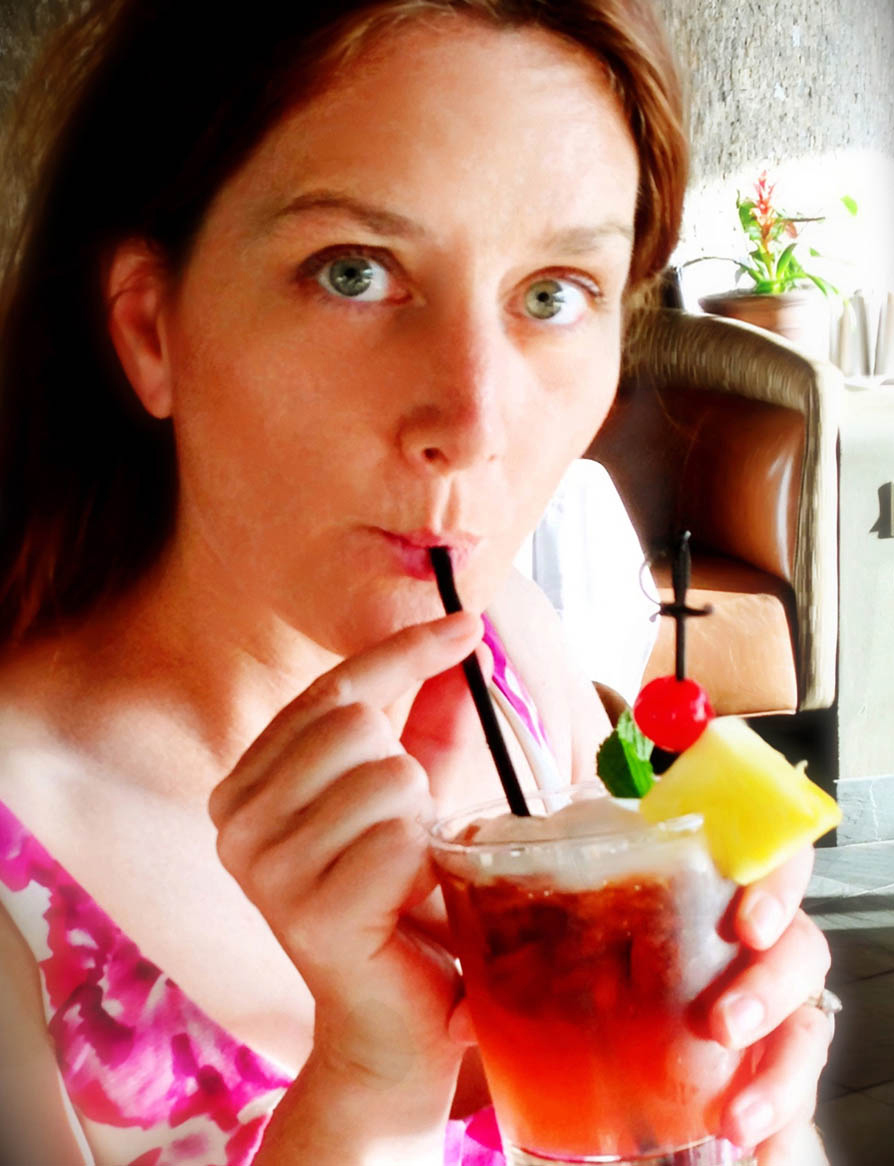
- Born: Kimberly Ann Gruenenfelder; October 24; St. Louis, Missouri, U.S.
- Other name: Kim Gruenenfelder Smith
- Education: University of California, Los Angeles (BA)
- Occupations: Author; screenwriter
- Works: A Total Waste of Makeup; Misery Loves Cabernet; There's Cake in My Future; Keep Calm and Carry a Big Drink; Love The Wine You're With; Hangovers & Hot Flashes; My Ex's Wedding
- Political party: Democratic
- Spouse: Brian Smith (m. 2000)
- Children: Alex Gruenenfelder
- Relatives: J. Kenneth Campbell (uncle); James Kenneth Campbell (maternal grandfather); Emma Rosenblum (cousin)
- Website: kimgruenenfelder.com

Kim Gruenenfelder is an American author and screenwriter. She became known for writing women's fiction, specifically romantic comedy fiction novels.

Her debut novel, A Total Waste of Makeup, has been published in six languages and eight international editions to date, and is followed by a sequel, Misery Loves Cabernet. Her next series began in 2010 with There's Cake in My Future, which was followed in 2013 by Keep Calm and Carry a Big Drink. Her fifth published novel, Love The Wine You're With, which details the adventures of a group of friends who open a wine bar, was released June 13, 2017. Her next novel Hangovers and Hot Flashes, released in December 2018, follows the lives of protagonists in their forties. Her latest novel, My Ex's Wedding, was published in 2020.

In addition to her published novels, she has written screenplays, a stage play, and was also a writer for the television show Jeopardy!. In 2016, she created the word "Eciah", which refers to a moment in your life when your future gets a lot brighter.

== Early life ==
Gruenenfelder was born in St. Louis, Missouri. Her father was Edmond Jacques Gruenenfelder III, a salesman. Her mother was Carol Campbell, a writer. Through her mother, Gruenenfelder is the niece of actor J. Kenneth Campbell, maternal granddaughter of James Kenneth Campbell, cousin of Emma Rosenblum and a descendant of Screen Actors Guild founding member Clay Clement. Gruenenfelder moved to Southern California with her family when she was seven years old. She graduated from Fountain Valley High School at age sixteen.

At age 16, Gruenenfelder began attending the University of California, Los Angeles. At age 20, Gruenenfelder graduated with a B.A. in history, specializing in women's history, from UCLA.

== Career ==
=== Entertainment ===
Gruenenfelder's career in the entertainment industry started at the age of nineteen when she became a production assistant on the show Jeopardy!. She became a researcher on the show at twenty and went on to become a screenwriter.

=== Novels ===
Gruenenfelder's first published novel was A Total Waste of Makeup, followed up by Misery Loves Cabernet. These are part of the Charlize series, focusing on a character named Charlize Edwards who starts the series by turning thirty. Depicting life in Hollywood and the entertainment industry, it includes characters like eccentric actor Drew Stanton.

Gruenenfelder then started a series about a cake pull, with There's Cake in My Future and then Keep Calm and Carry a Big Drink. These were her first novels focusing on three central characters per book, a trend she has continued.

Her fifth published novel, different from the others in terms of series, is Love The Wine You're With, detailing the adventures of a group of friends who open a wine bar in Echo Park.

Deciding not to have a second book in the wine bar series, she moved on to a series about characters in their forties. Describing that publishers continuously told her nobody would read books about characters in their forties, she went forward with the book anyway. In December 2018, Gruenenfelder released Hangovers and Hot Flashes.

In 2016, Gruenenfelder coined the term "eciah". She defines it as "moment in your life when your future suddenly gets a lot brighter", according to her website eciah.com. She is the curator for this website, founding and creating it. Her personal eciah was when she found out she was pregnant with her first and only child.

=== Audiobooks ===
Under her married name Kim Smith, Gruenenfelder is an audiobook director, specializing in celebrity reads. She directed The Jerusalem Syndrome: My Life as a Reluctant Messiah and Attempting Normal by Marc Maron, Mustache Shenanigans by Jay Chandrasekhar, Life Will Be the Death of Me: ...and You Too! by Chelsea Handler, and Dear Girls by Ali Wong. She has also directed audiobooks for other public figures, including Tyra Banks, Jennifer Beals, Lilia Buckingham, Jaina Lee Ortiz (reading for Sonia Sotomayor), Samira Wiley, Curtis Armstrong, and Robbie Rogers.

As Kim Gruenenfelder Smith, she directed the audiobook for Nicholas Kristof and Sheryl WuDunn's Tightrope: Americans Reaching for Hope, which was narrated by Jennifer Garner.

Gruenenfelder directed the audiobook for Tara Westover's memoir Educated, narrated by Julia Whelan. The audiobook was recognized by the American Library Association for 2019 Amazing Audiobooks for Young Adults, as well as being named Audible's 2019 Best Memoir of the Year. Most notably, Educated received the Audie Award for Autobiography or Memoir in 2019.

Multiple other audiobooks directed by Gruenenfelder have been nominated for Audie Awards. Gruenenfelder directed Marriage Be Hard by Kevin and Melissa Fredericks in 2022, which was nominated for the Audie Award for Faith-Based Fiction and Nonfiction. Marriage Be Hard was also nominated for an NAACP Image Award in 2023.

=== Politics ===
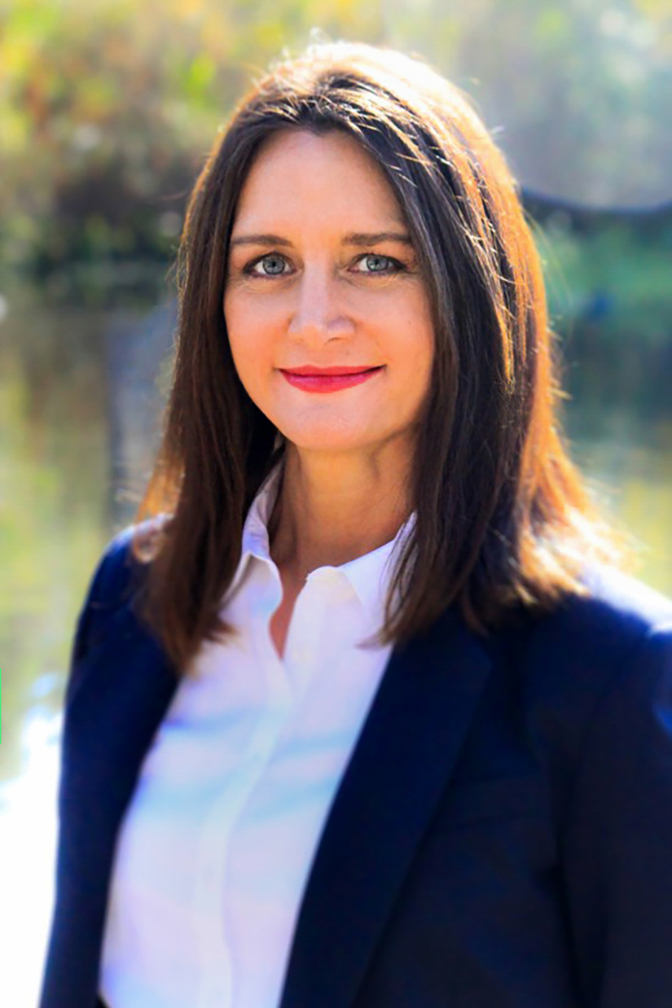
Kim Gruenenfelder for Congress publicity photo

In January 2018, Gruenenfelder announced a campaign for the United States House of Representatives, to represent California's 28th congressional district. A member of the Democratic Party, Gruenenfelder challenged incumbent Adam Schiff on a platform that included single-payer healthcare, opposition to foreign wars, and the creation of a Federal Ballot Initiative to nationally allow for proposition-based direct democracy. She also expressed support for gun control, climate change mitigation, DACA, and public charter schools. On March 3, Gruenenfelder officially withdrew from the race.

Gruenenfelder endorsed Barack Obama in 2008 and 2012, and fundraised for his campaign. Gruenenfelder endorsed Seth Moulton in the 2020 Democratic primary. A supporter of Black Lives Matter, Gruenenfelder participated in protests in Los Angeles after the murder of George Floyd.

== Bibliography ==
- A Total Waste of Makeup, St. Martin's Press, 2005
- Misery Loves Cabernet, St. Martin's Press, 2009
- There's Cake in My Future, St. Martin's Press, 2010
- Keep Calm and Carry a Big Drink, St. Martin's Press, 2013
- Love The Wine You're With, St. Martin's Press, 2017
- Hangovers & Hot Flashes, Geoghegan & Burke Publishing, 2018
- My Ex's Wedding, Geoghegan & Burke Publishing, 2020

== Personal life ==
Gruenenfelder's husband is writer and director Brian Smith. They have one son, Alex. Gruenenfelder lives in Los Angeles, California.

== See also ==
- Women's fiction
- Romantic comedy
