= Mercer University School of Law =

Law school in Macon, Georgia, USA

Coordinates: 32°50′30.27″N 83°38′06.26″W

- Established: 1873; 153 years ago
- School type: Private
- Dean: Karen Sneddon
- Location: Macon, Georgia, U.S.
- Enrollment: 423 (2024)
- Faculty: 69 (2024, 25 full-time, 44 adjunct)
- USNWR ranking: 107th (tie) (2025)
- Bar pass rate: 84.00% (2024 first-time takers all jurisdictions)
- Website: law.mercer.edu

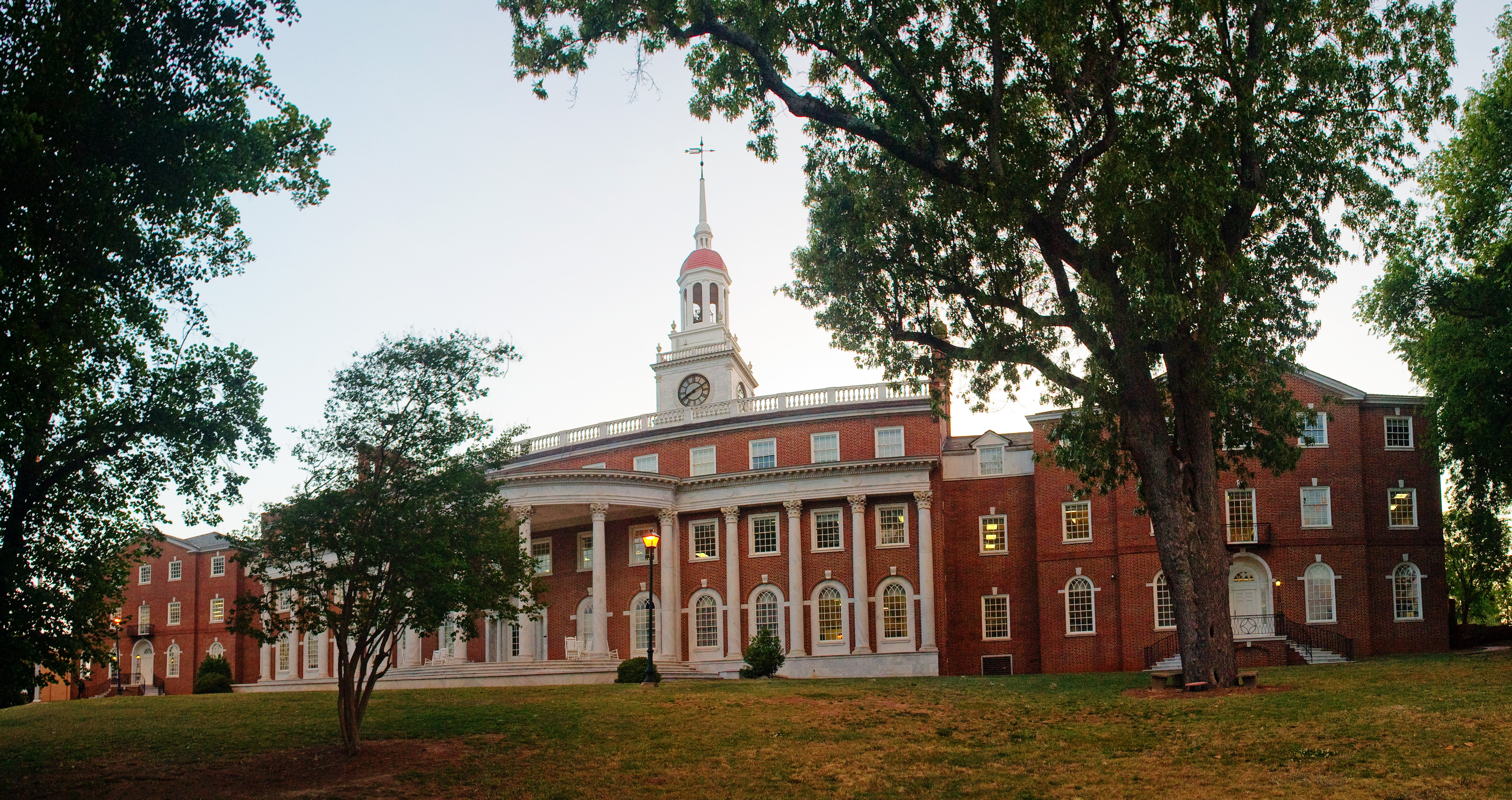
Mercer University School of Law, on Coleman Hill overlooking downtown Macon

Mercer University School of Law (historically Walter F. George School of Law) is the law school of Mercer University. Founded in 1873, it is one of the oldest law schools in the United States; the first law school accredited by the bar in Georgia, and the second oldest of Mercer's 12 colleges and schools. The School of Law has approximately 420 students and is located in Macon, Georgia on its own campus one mile (1.6 km) from Mercer's main campus.

The law school building, one of Macon's most recognizable sites, is a three-story partial replica of Independence Hall in Philadelphia, and is located on Coleman Hill overlooking downtown Macon. According to Mercer's official 2025 ABA-required disclosures, 88.46% of the Class of 2024 obtained full-time, long-term, JD-required employment (i.e. as attorneys) nine months after graduation, and 4.81% obtained employment where a JD was an advantage.

== Dean of the School ==
Karen Sneddon began as Interim Dean on October 1, 2021 and was officially appointed to the position in May, 2023. She was preceded by Cathy Cox.

Cathy Cox became dean in 2017. She was previously president of Young Harris College. Cox is an alumnus of Mercer University School of Law, a former member of the Georgia House of Representatives, served two terms as Georgia's secretary of state, 1999-2007, and is currently president of Georgia College & State University.

Her predecessor was Daisy Hurst Floyd who had been reappointed as dean in 2014. She assumed responsibility from Gary J. Simson, dean from 2010–14, who was elevated by Mercer to a university-wide position as senior vice provost for scholarship. Floyd previously served as dean from 2004–10 and is a senior member of the law school faculty.

== Walter F. George ==
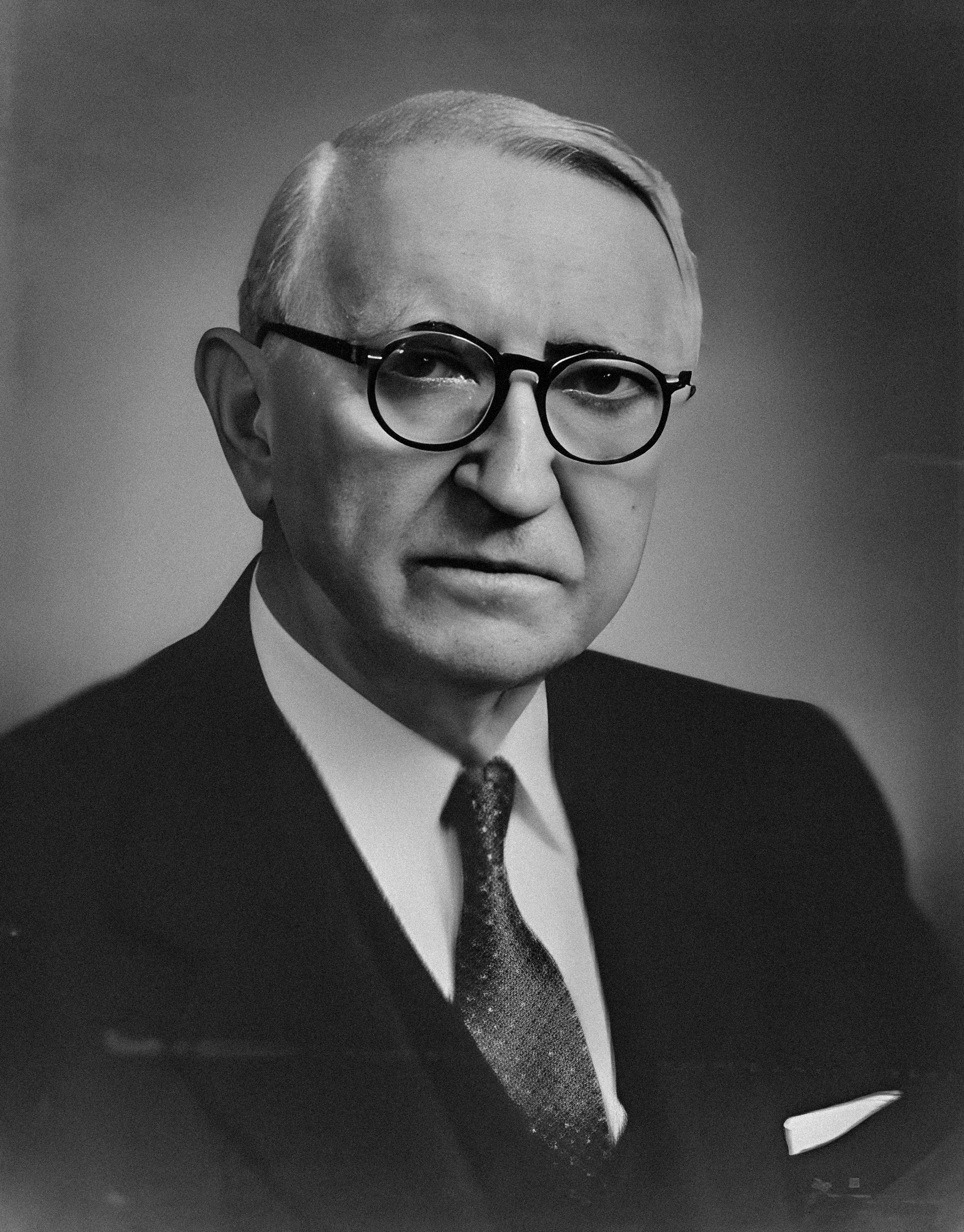
Walter F. George, class of 1901, namesake of Mercer Law School.

The School of Law is named for Walter F. George, Mercer Law class of 1901, who served as United States Senator from Georgia from 1922–57 and as President pro tempore from 1955-57. Before election to the Senate, he served as a Judge of the Georgia Court of Appeals in 1917 and as a Justice of the Georgia Supreme Court from 1917-22. Mercer named its law school the Walter F. George School of Law of Mercer University in 1947. Fred M. Vinson, Chief Justice of the United States, participated in the naming ceremony.

The Walter F. George Foundation, created when the school was named, continues to fund scholarships for Mercer law students who have a demonstrated interest in pursuing a career in public service. Walter F. George Foundation Public Service Scholarships cover full tuition for three years of law school along with community service grants for first-year and second-year summer public service internships.

== Centennial ==
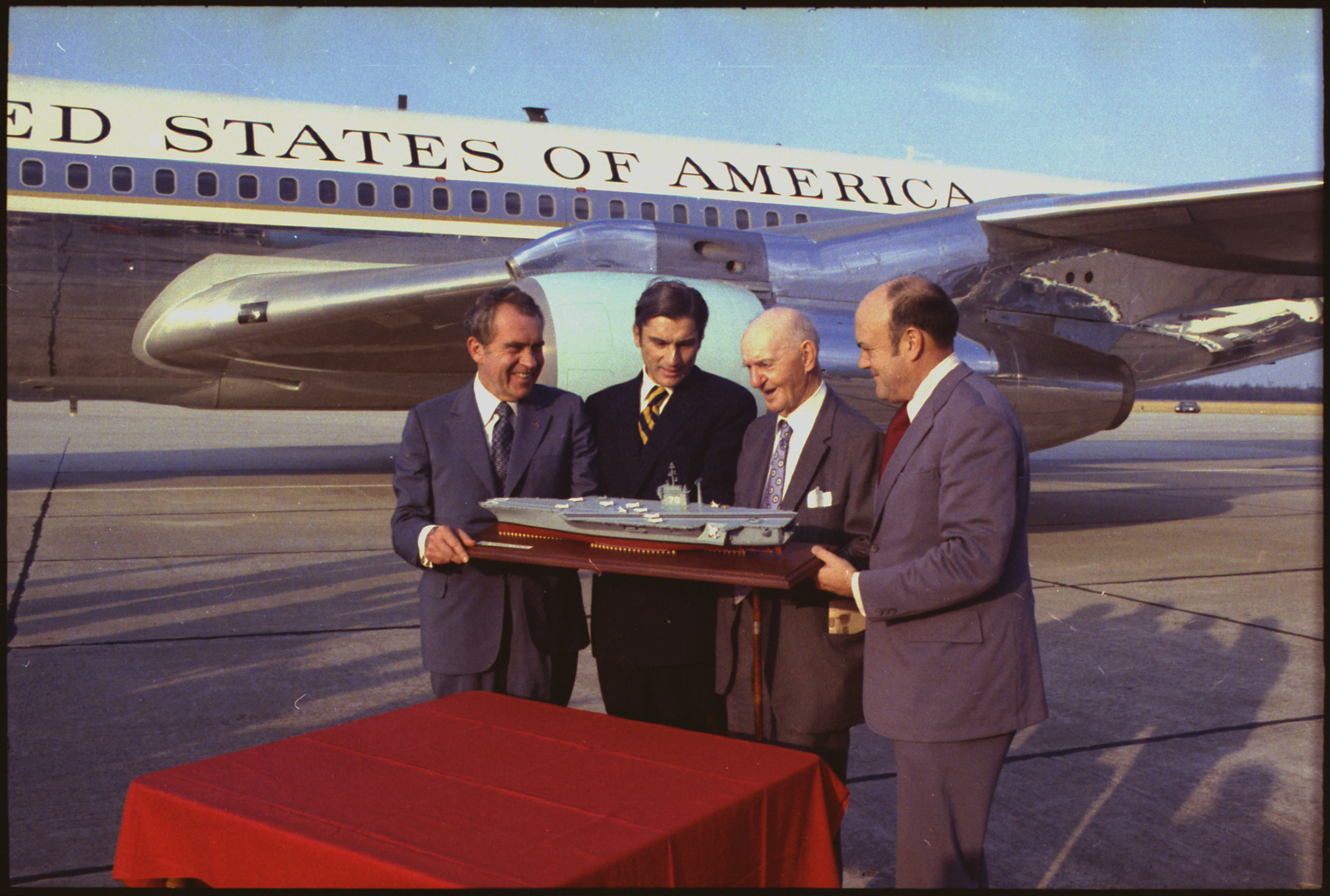
President Richard Nixon, Navy Secretary John Warner and Defense Secretary Melvin Laird present Congressman Carl Vinson, class of 1902 (third from left) with a model of the USS Carl Vinson aircraft carrier, November 18, 1973.

The School of Law celebrated its centennial in 1973 and 90th birthday of Carl Vinson. The principal event occurred on November 18, 1973; participants included Richard Nixon, President of the United States and Jimmy Carter, Governor of Georgia and future President of the United States. In his speech, President Nixon announced the nation's third Nimitz-class nuclear aircraft carrier would be named in honor of Carl Vinson, Mercer Law class of 1902. Vinson, who was present at the event, was the first member of the United States House of Representatives to serve for more than 50 years (he served 1914-65), and was the long-time chairman of the House Armed Services Committee. Also present were Secretary of Defense Melvin Laird and Secretary of the Navy John Warner.

== Accreditation and rankings ==
The School of Law has been a member of the Association of American Law Schools since 1923 and has been fully accredited by the American Bar Association (ABA) since 1925. It is the first law school to be ABA accredited in the state of Georgia.

In the 2025 edition of its law school rankings, U.S. News & World Report ranked Mercer tied for 107th out of the 197 ABA accredited law schools. The 2025 edition also ranked Mercer's legal writing program tied at No.15, and its Trial Advocacy program tied at No.12, out of 197 ABA accredited law schools.

The Princeton Review includes Mercer in the 2025 edition of its "Best Law Schools".

== Academics ==
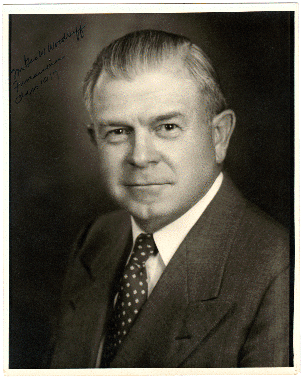
George W. Woodruff, namesake of Mercer's Woodruff Curriculum. The curriculum is viewed as a model for other law schools and has been honored with the prestigious Gambrell Professionalism Award from the American Bar Association.

As of 2024, the School of Law enrolled 423 students and had a faculty of 25 full-time professors and 44 adjunct professors. The following degrees are offered: Juris Doctor (JD), a joint Juris Doctor/Master of Business Administration (JD/MBA) in conjunction with Mercer's Eugene W. Stetson School of Business and Economics, and a Master of Laws (LLM) in Federal Criminal Practice and Procedure, which is the nation's only LLM program with this subject matter focus. The school publishes the Mercer Law Review, the oldest law review in Georgia (founded in 1949), and the Journal of Southern Legal History.

The School of Law's model curriculum, the Woodruff Curriculum, named for philanthropist George W. Woodruff, is viewed as a model for law schools across the United States. The curriculum, based on small classes and a practice oriented approach, focuses on legal ethics, professional responsibility, and legal writing and has been honored with the prestigious Gambrell Professionalism Award from the American Bar Association.

The School of Law houses the Mercer Center for Legal Ethics and Professionalism, established in 2000 and dedicated to fostering and teaching ethics and professionalism in the practice of law, and the National Criminal Defense College, a not-for-profit organization established in 1985 and devoted to improved trial advocacy and trial practice.

== Admissions ==
For the class entering in 2024, the School of Law accepted 43.27% of applicants, with 29.16% of those accepted enrolling. The average enrollee had a 155 LSAT score and 3.63 undergraduate GPA.

== Law Library ==
The Furman Smith Law Library, named for Furman Smith, Mercer Law class of 1932, is the school's center of legal research. The library is used by state lawyers and judges. The library occupies over 30,000 square feet (3,000 m^{2}) in a central location on the second floor of the law school building. Large windows in the library provide students with views of historic Macon from the law building's location on Coleman Hill.

== Bar passage ==
In 2024, the overall bar examination passage rate for the Law School’s first-time examination takers was 84.00% (including 87.36% for Georgia), which was above the ABA first time average pass rate of 79.31%. The Ultimate Bar Pass Rate, which the ABA defines as the passage rate for graduates who sat for bar examinations within two years of graduating, was 93.91% for the class of 2022.

== Employment ==
According to Mercer's official 2025 ABA-required disclosures, 88.46% of the Class of 2024 obtained full-time, long-term, JD-required employment (i.e. as attorneys) within nine months after graduation, while 4.81% obtained employment where a JD was an advantage. Most JD-required employment graduates were employed by firms of 1–25 attorneys, though ten were employed by firms of 101–501+ attorneys, and four obtained federal court clerkships. Four graduates were seeking employment, one was not seeking, and the status of one graduate was unknown. For the Class of 2023, Mercer's Law School Transparency / LawHub under-employment score was 9%, indicating the percentage of the class unemployed, pursuing an additional degree, or working in a non-professional, short-term, or part-time job nine months after graduation.

== Costs ==
The total cost of tuition and fees at Mercer for the 2025–26 academic year is $45,082. The anticipated total cost of living is $23,289, bringing the anticipated total yearly cost of attendance to $68,371. If there are no increases, the anticipated cost of attendance through graduation is $205,113. For 2023, Law School Transparency estimated the debt-financed cost of attendance for three years was $235,004 while 46.6% of students received some form of a discount.

== Notable alumni ==
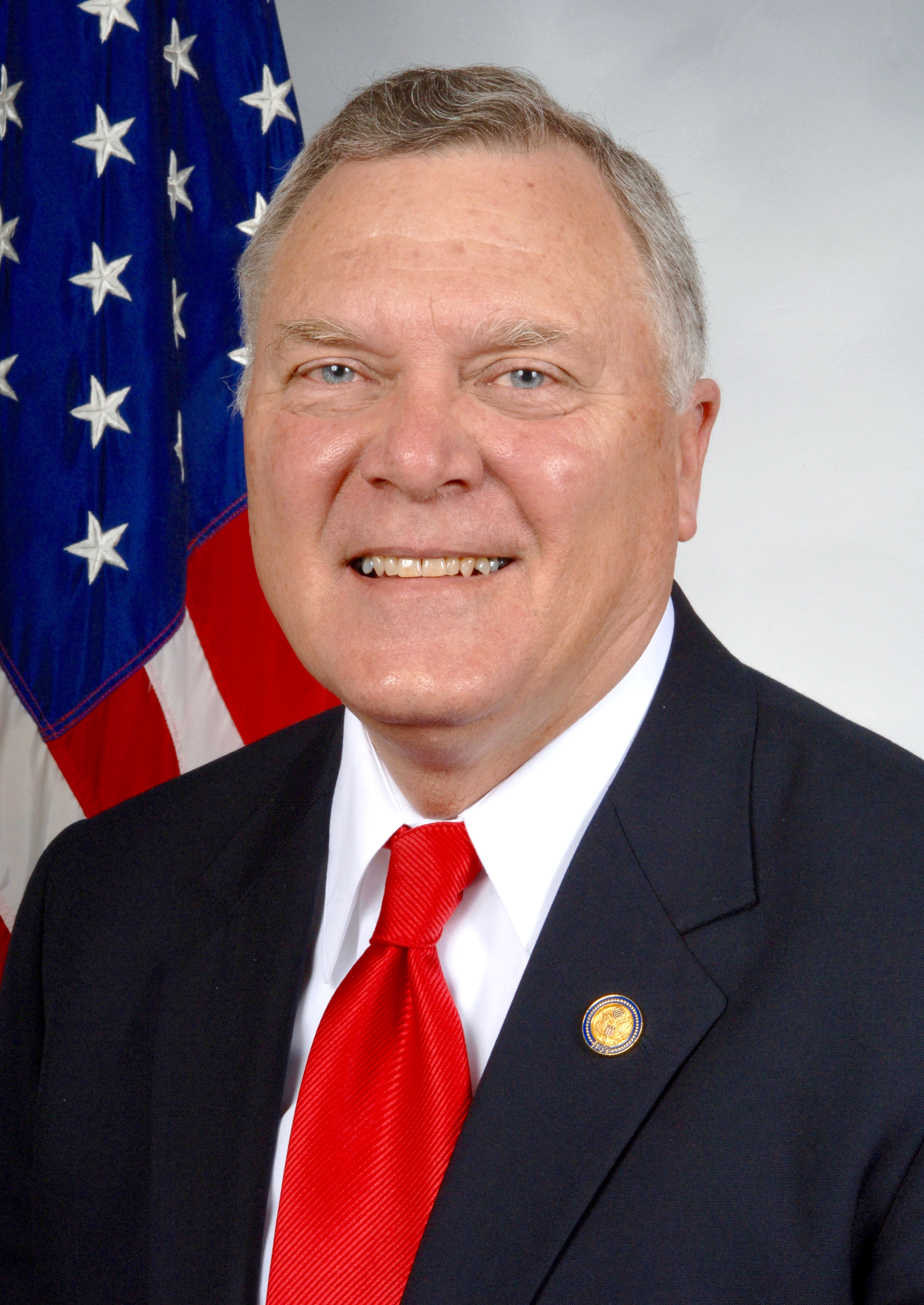
Nathan Deal, JD 1966, elected in 2010, was the Governor of Georgia. 2011-19

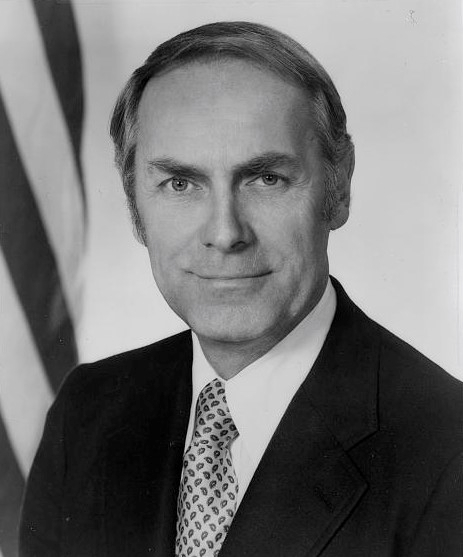
Doug Barnard, Jr., LLB 1948, United States Representative, 1977-93.

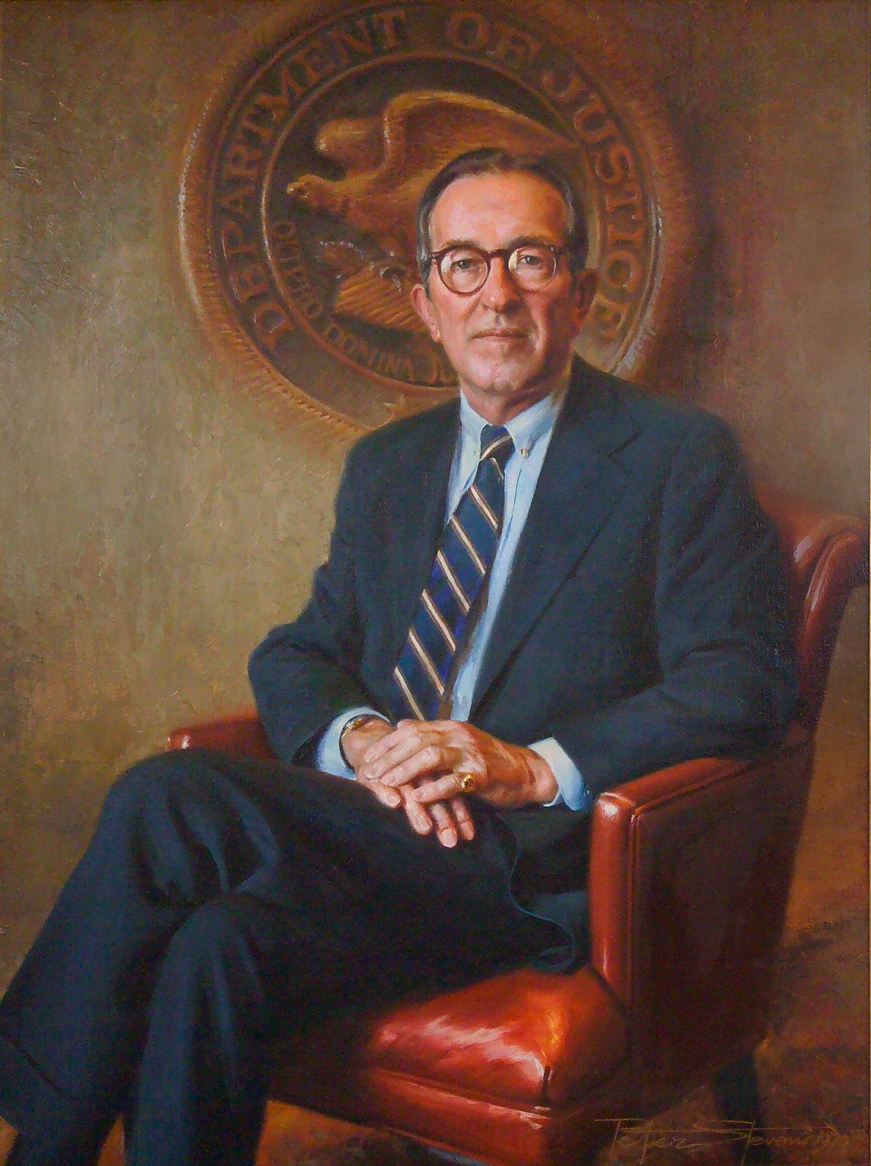
Griffin Bell, LLB 1948, Attorney General of the United States, 1977-79.

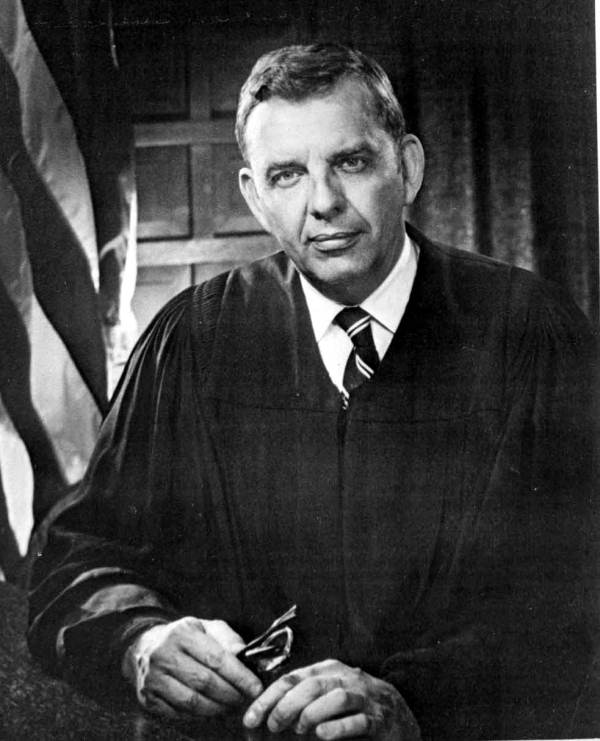
G. Harrold Carswell, LLB 1948, Judge of the United States Court of Appeals for the Fifth Circuit and unsuccessful nominee to the United States Supreme Court, 1970.

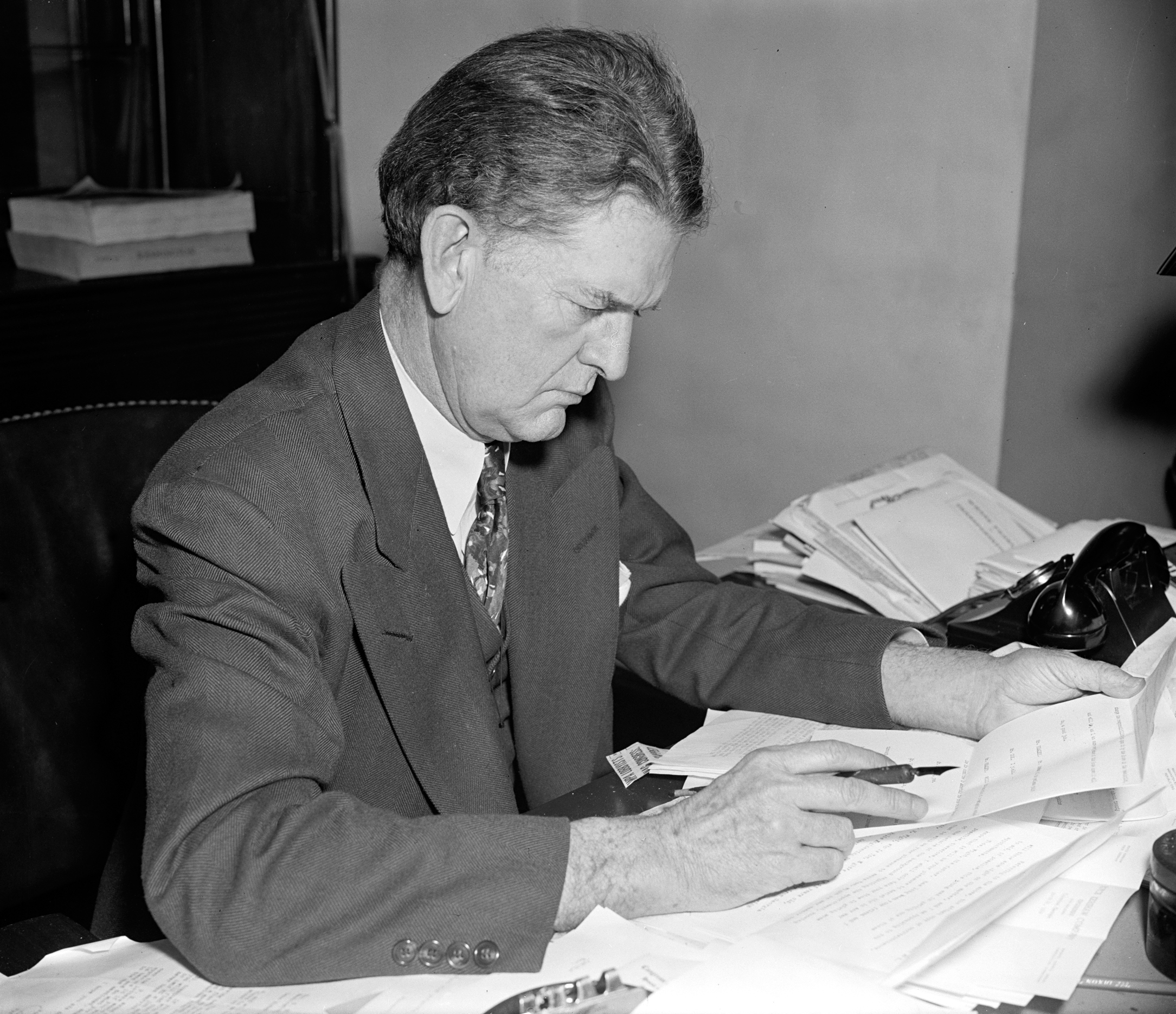
E. Eugene Cox, LLB 1902, United States Representative, 1925-52.

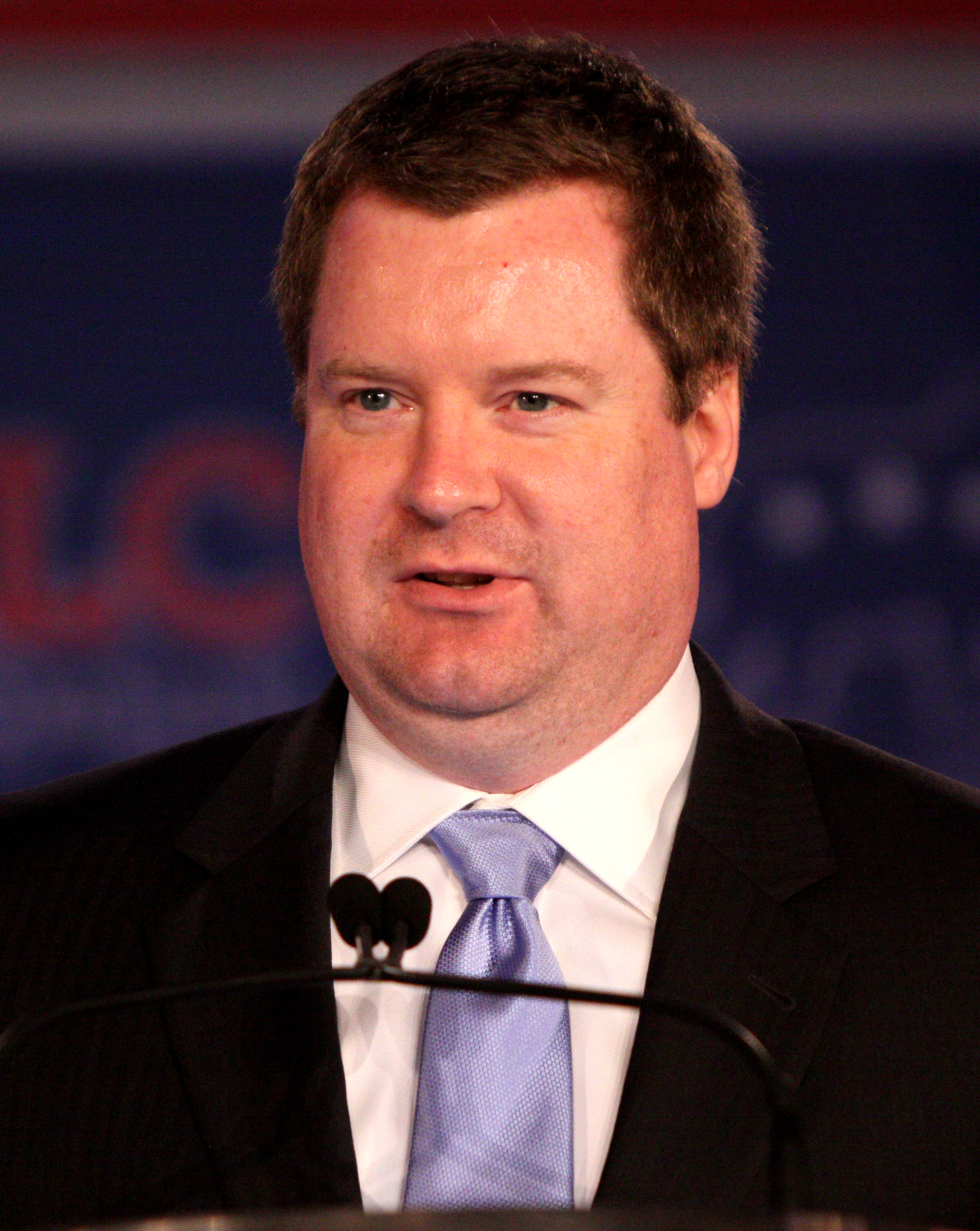
Erick Erickson, JD 2000, political commentator for CNN and RedState.

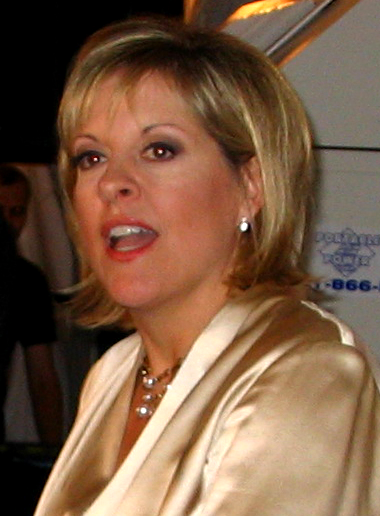
Nancy Grace, JD 1984, political commentator and the host of her own show on Headline News.

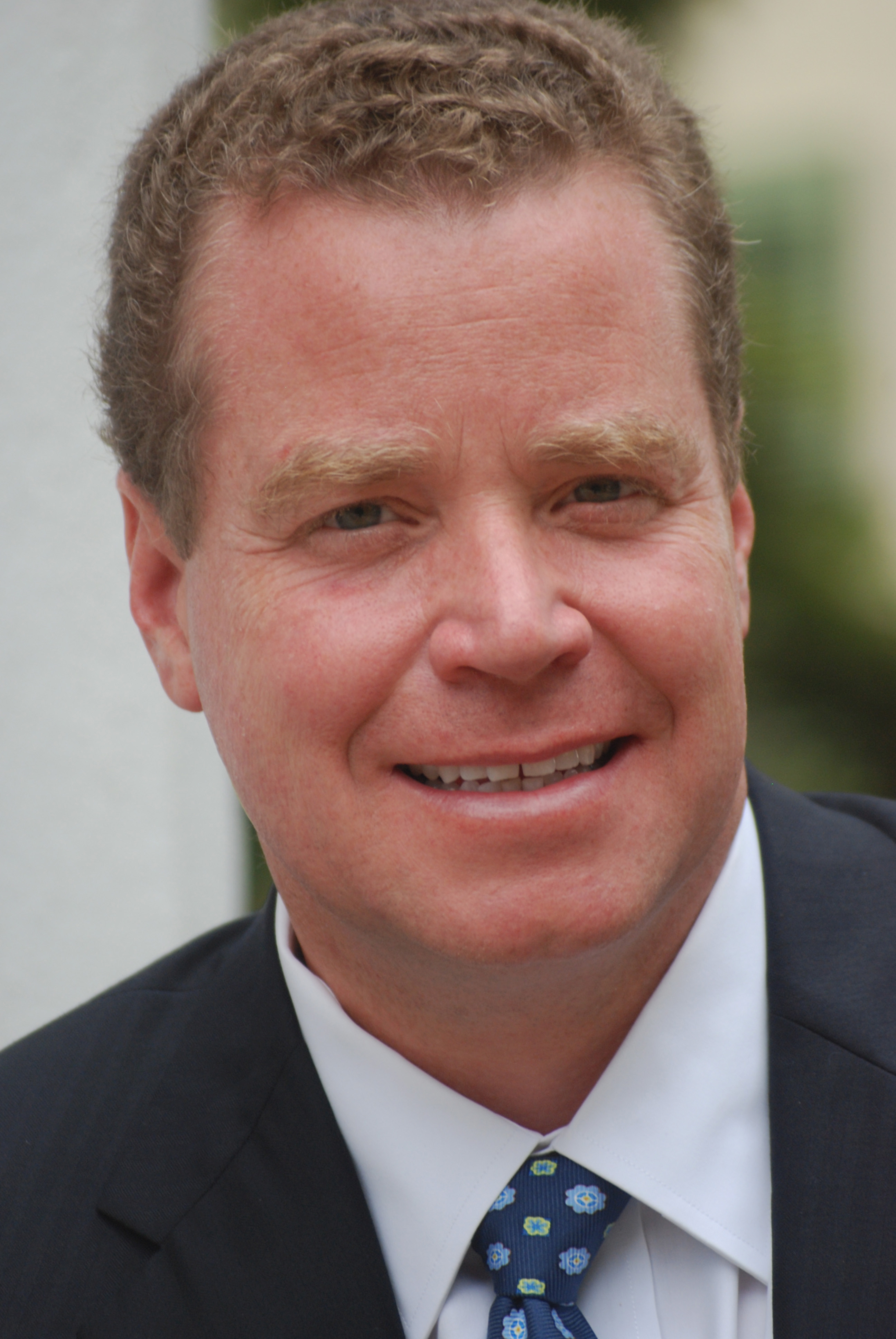
John Oxendine, JD 1987, Georgia Insurance Commissioner, 1995-11.

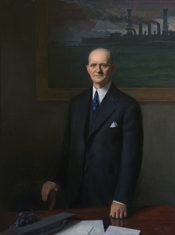
Carl Vinson, LLB 1902, United States Representative, 1914–65; the first person to serve more than 50 years in the House of Representatives and namesake of the USS Carl Vinson, a nuclear-powered aircraft carrier.

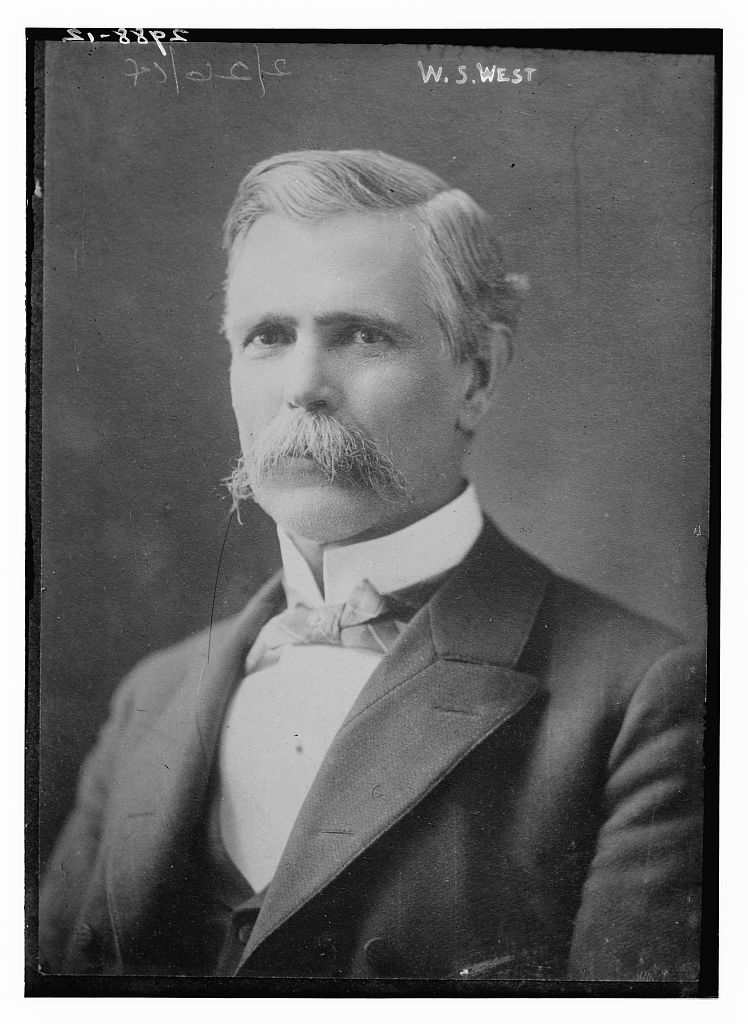
William S. West, LLB 1876, United States Senator for the year 1914 (appointed for one year to fill an unexpired term); instrumental in the founding of Valdosta State University.

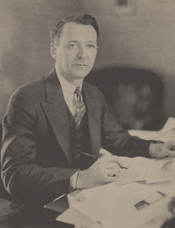
J. Mark Wilcox, LLB 1910, United States Representative, 1933–39; namesake of Miami International Airport Wilcox Field.

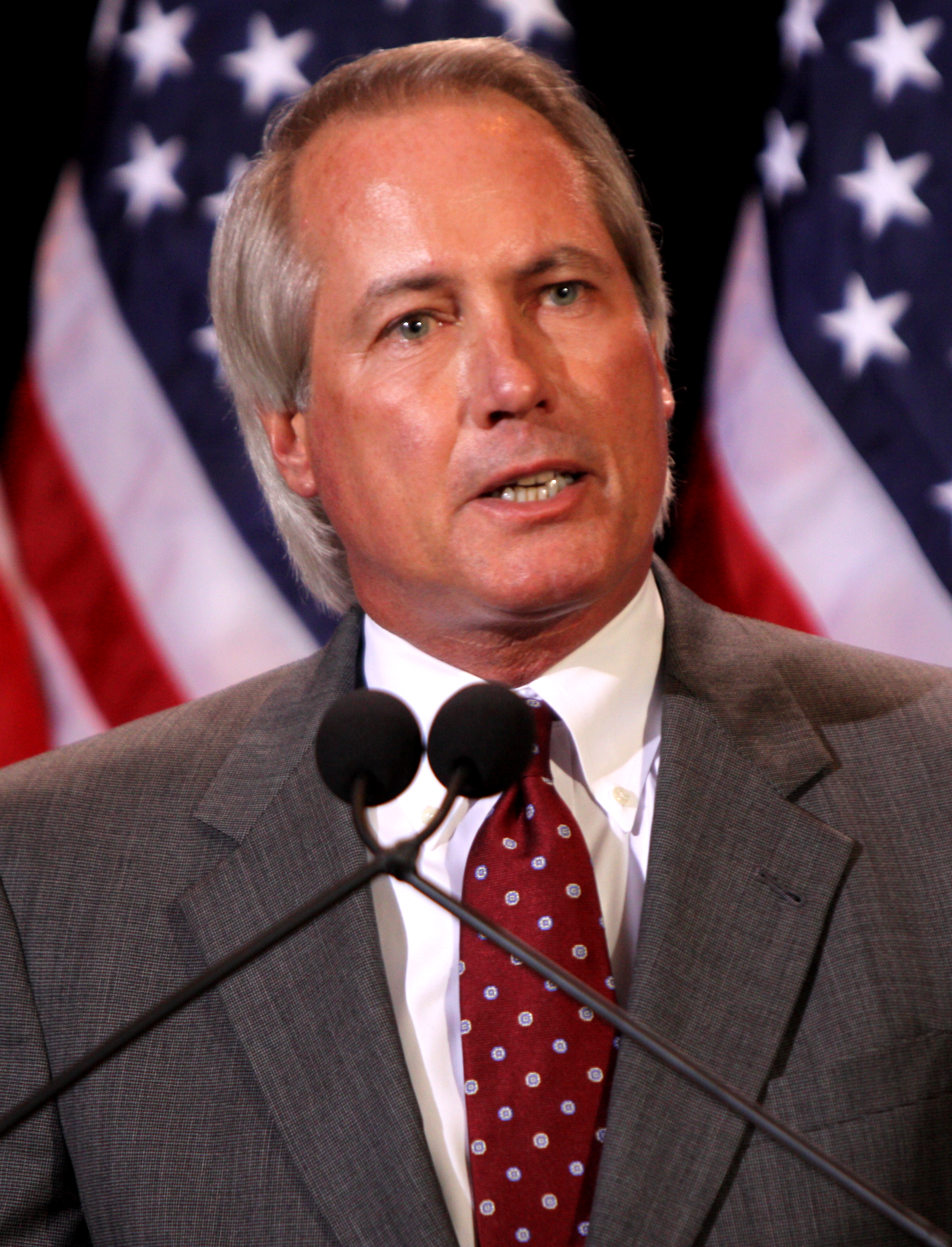
L. Lin Wood, JD 1977, high-profile attorney who has represented Richard Jewell, the parents of JonBenét Ramsey, Gary Condit, Kobe Bryant, and Herman Cain.

Not long ago Mercer alumni have headed two of Georgia's three branches of government: Nathan Deal, JD 1966, was the Governor of Georgia, 2011–2019, and Hugh P. Thompson, JD 1969, was the Chief Justice of the Georgia Supreme Court, 2013–2016. In the Georgia General Assembly, Judson H. Hill, Sr., JD 1986, served until 2017 as Chairman of the Senate Finance Committee; William T. Ligon, Jr., JD 1986, served as Chairman of the Senate State and Local Governmental Operations Committee. Sara L. Doyle, JD 1994, is a judge of the Georgia Court of Appeals.

=== Judiciary ===
- Griffin Bell - U.S. appeals court judge, 1962–76; 72nd Attorney General of the United States, 1977-79
- Michael P. Boggs - judge, Georgia Court of Appeals, 2012–17; associate justice, Georgia Supreme Court, 2017–22; chief justice, Georgia Supreme Court, 2022–present
- William Augustus Bootle - judge, U.S. District Court for the Middle District of Georgia, 1954–81; ordered admission of the first African-American to the University of Georgia, 1961; namesake of the William Augustus Bootle Federal Building and United States Courthouse in Macon
- Fred P. Branson - chief justice Oklahoma Supreme Court, 1927–29
- G. Harrold Carswell - judge, U.S. District Court for the Northern District of Florida, 1958–69; judge, United States Court of Appeals for the Fifth Circuit, 1969–70; unsuccessful nominee to the United States Supreme Court, 1970
- Abraham Benjamin Conger - judge, U.S. District Court for the Middle District of Georgia, 1949–53
- Bascom Sine Deaver - judge, U.S. District Court for the Middle District of Georgia, 1928–44
- Albert John Henderson - U.S. appeals court judge, 1979–99; judge, U.S. District Court for the Northern District of Georgia, 1968–79
- Richard Henry Mills - judge, U.S. District Court for the Central District of Illinois, 1985–present
- Carlton Mobley - chief justice, Georgia Supreme Court, 1972–74; associate justice, 1954-72; United States representative, Georgia's 6th Congressional District, 1932–33
- Willie Louis Sands - judge, U.S. District Court for the Middle District of Georgia, 1994–present; the first African-American to serve on this district court
- Marc T. Treadwell - judge, U.S. District Court for the Middle District of Georgia, 2010–present
- Julian Webb - judge, Georgia Court of Appeals, 1974-1979, and member of the Georgia State Senate, 1963-1974
- Charles W. Worrill - justice, Georgia Supreme Court, 1953–1954

=== Politics ===
- Doug Barnard - United States representative, Georgia's 10th Congressional district, 1977–93
- William Bradley Bryant - Georgia superintendent of schools, 2010–11
- Cathy Cox - Georgia secretary of state, 1999-07, the first woman elected to this position; former dean of Mercer University School of law; former president of Young Harris College; president of Georgia College & State University (2021–)
- E. Eugene Cox - United States representative, Georgia's 2nd Congressional district, 1925–52
- Nathan Deal - United States representative, Georgia's 9th Congressional district, 1993-10; governor of Georgia, 2011-19
- Peter Zack Geer - Georgia lieutenant governor, 1963–67
- Walter F. George - United States senator from Georgia, 1922–57, served as president pro tempore, 1955–57; namesake of Mercer's Law School
- Buck Melton - mayor of Macon, Georgia, 1975-79
- Michael Meyer von Bremen - Georgia state senator, 1999-09; served as the Democratic Party Senate minority leader, 2002–09
- John Oxendine - Georgia insurance commissioner, 1995-11
- Robert Reichert - mayor of Macon and former member of the Georgia House of Representatives, 2007–present
- Dwight L. Rogers - United States representative, Florida's 6th Congressional district, 1945–54
- Christopher N. Smith - honorary consul of the Kingdom of Denmark
- Malcolm C. Tarver - United States representative, Georgia's 7th Congressional district, 1927–47
- Carl Vinson - United States representative for over 50 years, 1914–65; long-time chairman, House Armed Services Committee; has been called the "patriarch of the armed services" and the "father of the two-ocean navy"; namesake of the USS Carl Vinson
- William S. West - United States senator from Georgia for the year 1914 (appointment to fill unexpired term); instrumental in the founding of Valdosta State University
- J. Mark Wilcox - United States representative, Florida's 4th Congressional district, 1933–39
- John S. Wood - United States representative, Georgia's 9th Congressional district, 1931–35 and 1945–53; chairman, House Un-American Activities Committee, 1949–53

=== Arts, media, and non-government public service ===
- Glen Ashman - author of the Georgia Municipal Court Judges Benchbook
- Steve Berry - author of six novels including several New York Times bestsellers
- Brainerd Currie - law professor; noted conflict of laws scholar who developed the characterisation concept of governmental interest analysis
- Nancy Grace - anchor for Court TV, legal commentator, and host of Nancy Grace on the Headline News television network
- Jay Sekulow - chief counsel, American Center for Law and Justice
- L. Lin Wood - high profile trial attorney; has represented Richard Jewell, the parents of JonBenét Ramsey, Gary Condit, Kobe Bryant, and Herman Cain
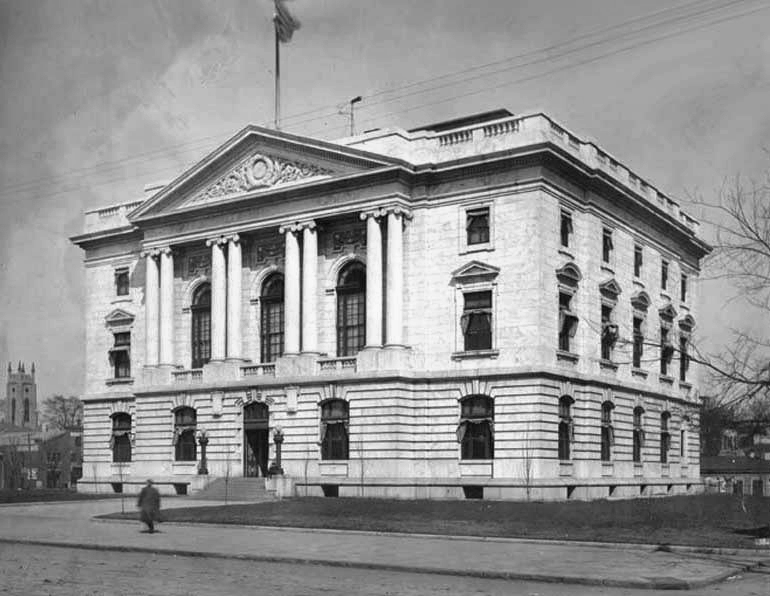
William Augustus Bootle Federal Building and United States Courthouse in Macon. Judge "Gus" Bootle '25, served as Judge of the Federal District Court for the Middle District of Georgia from 1954–81 and ordered desegregation of the University of Georgia in 1961. The building was named in his honor in 1998.

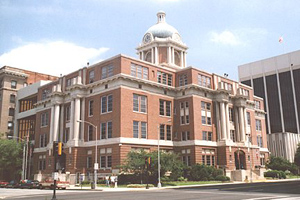
J. Taylor Phillips Bibb County Courthouse in Macon. Judge Phillips '55, served as State Court judge from 1964-12 and earlier served in the Georgia House of Representatives (1959–62) and Georgia State Senate (1963-64). The building was named in his honor in 2012.

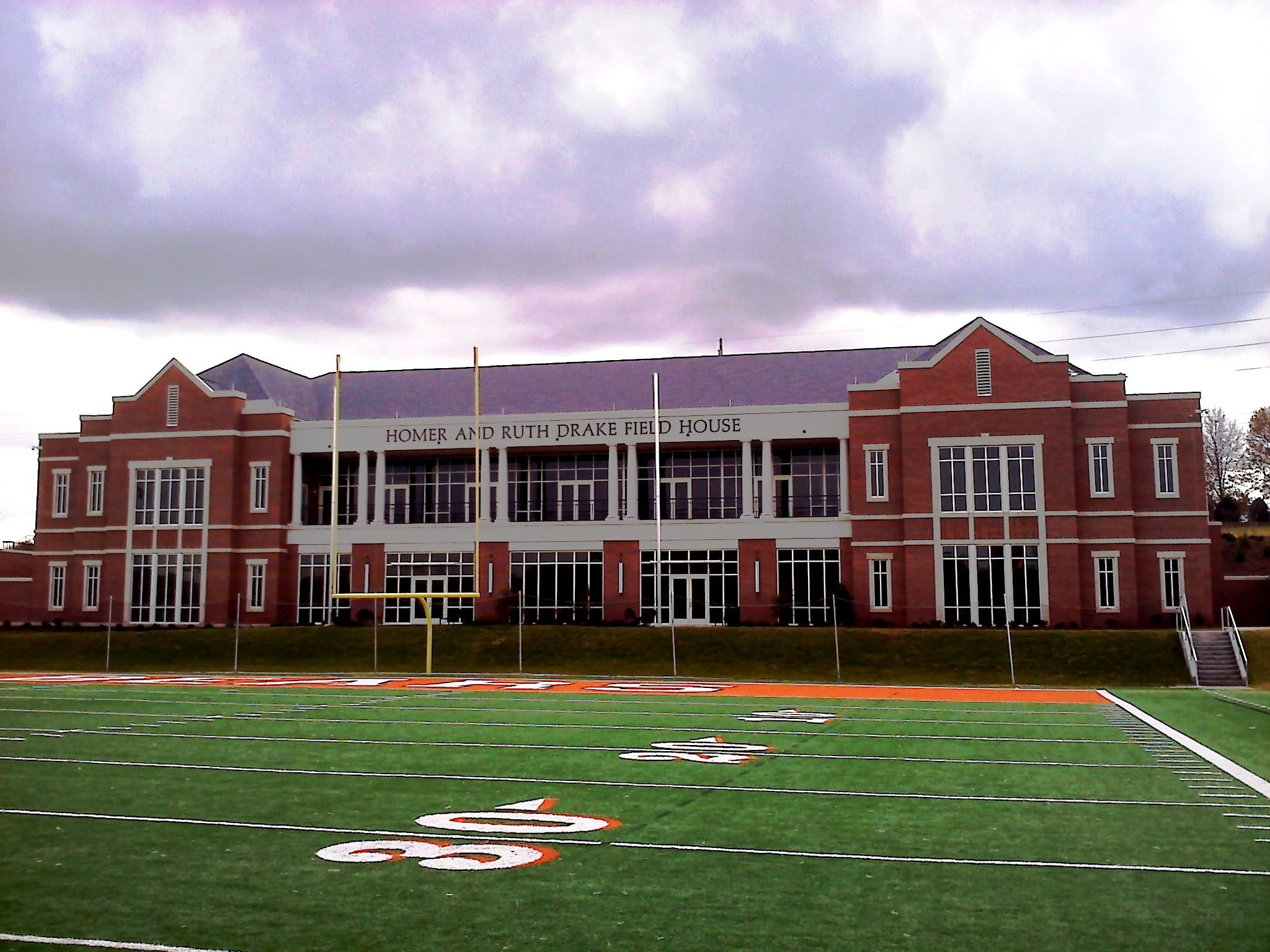
Homer and Ruth Drake Field House at Mercer University Stadium. Judge Drake '56, is a Senior Bankruptcy Judge, United States District Court for the Northern District of Georgia, 1979–present. He was chairman of the Mercer University Board of Trustees, 2008-10. The building was named in honor of Judge Drake and his spouse in 2012.

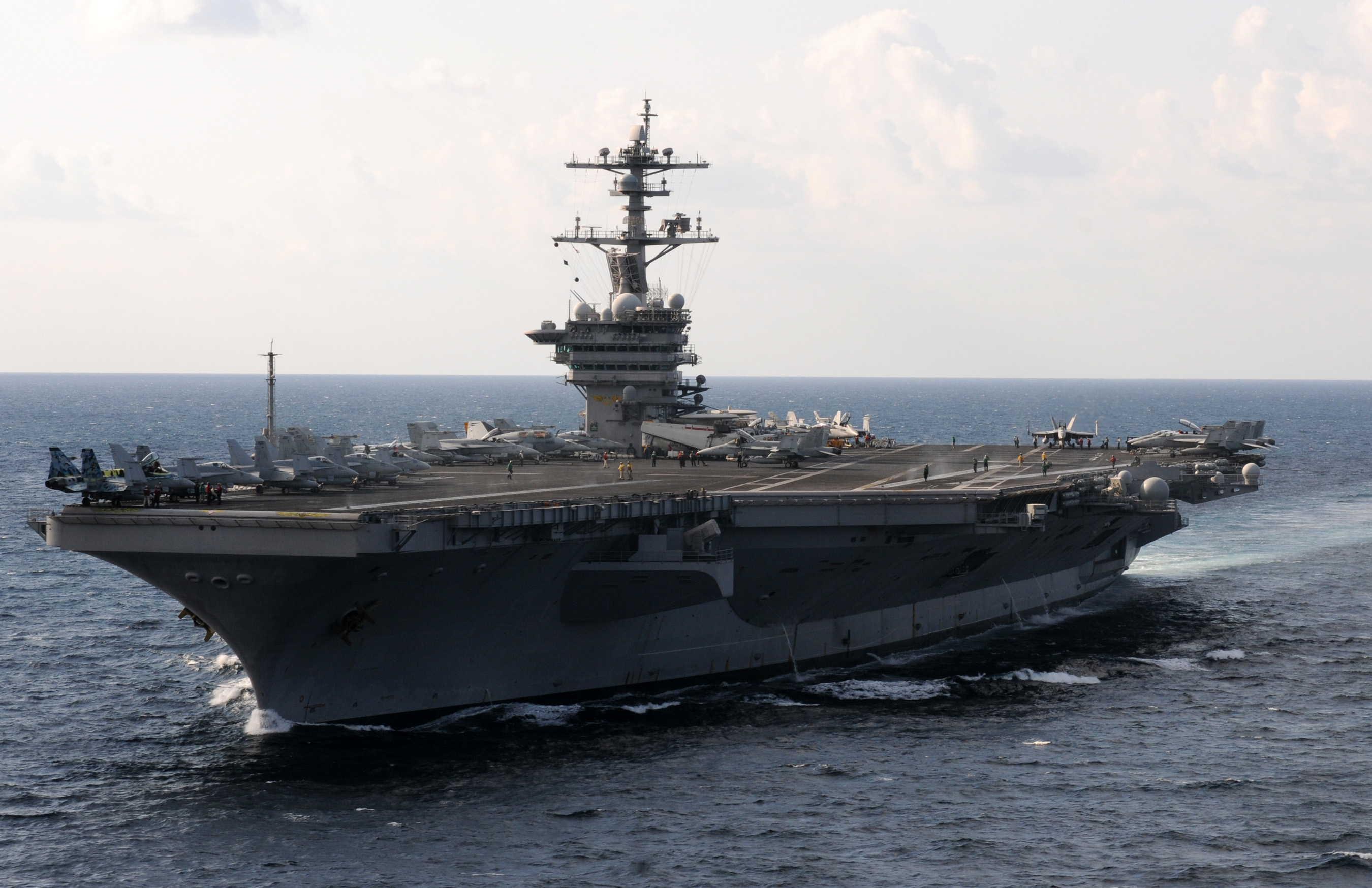
USS Carl Vinson, a nuclear-powered aircraft carrier. Congressman Carl Vinson '02, was the first person to serve more than 50 years in the United States House of Representatives, 1914-65. The ship was named in his honor in 1973.

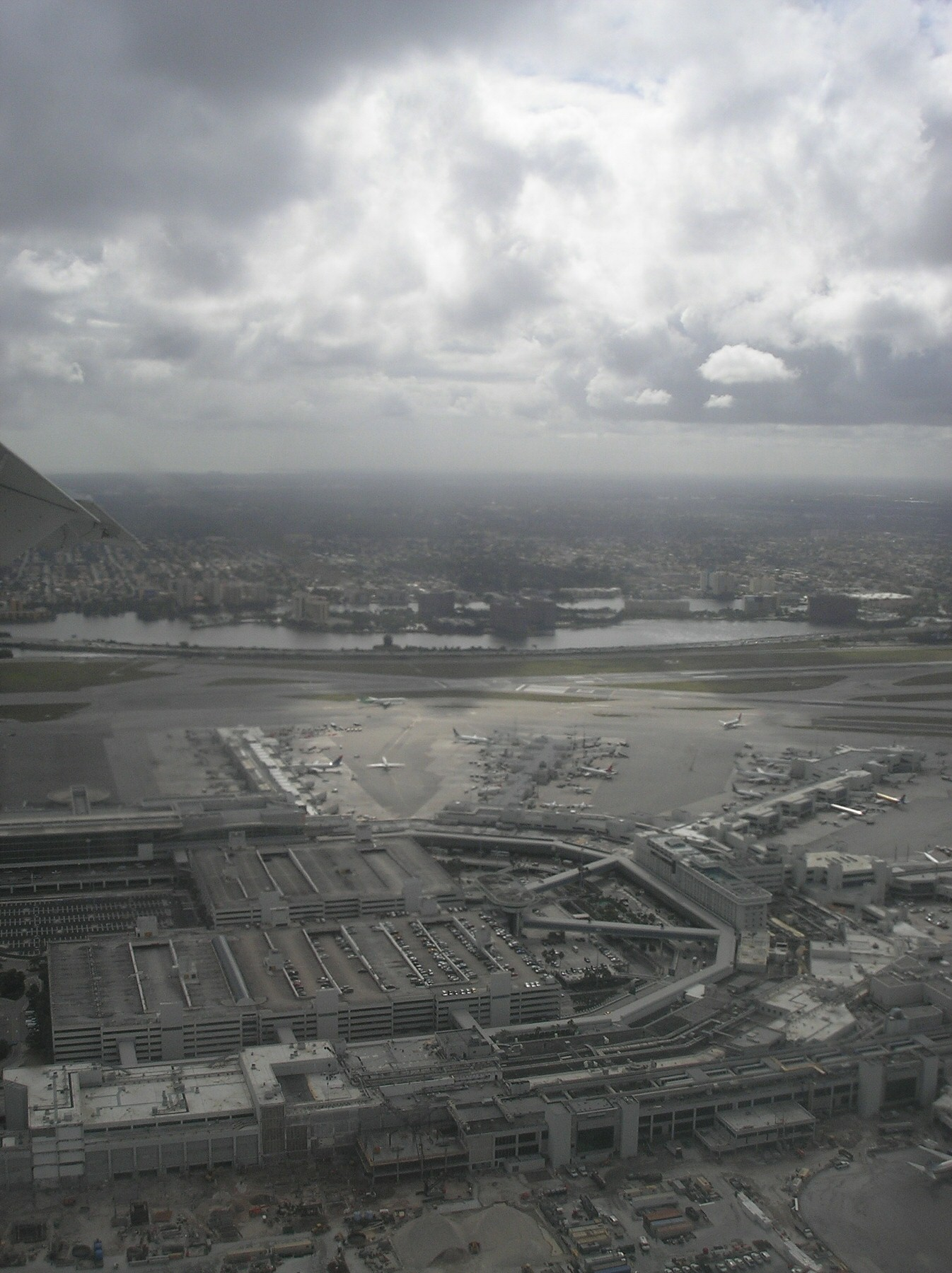
Miami International Airport Wilcox Field. Congressman J. Mark Wilcox '10, served in the United States House of Representatives, 1933–39 and later served as Attorney General of the Dade County Port Authority/Greater Miami Traffic Association (1945–56). The airport was named in his honor in 1959.

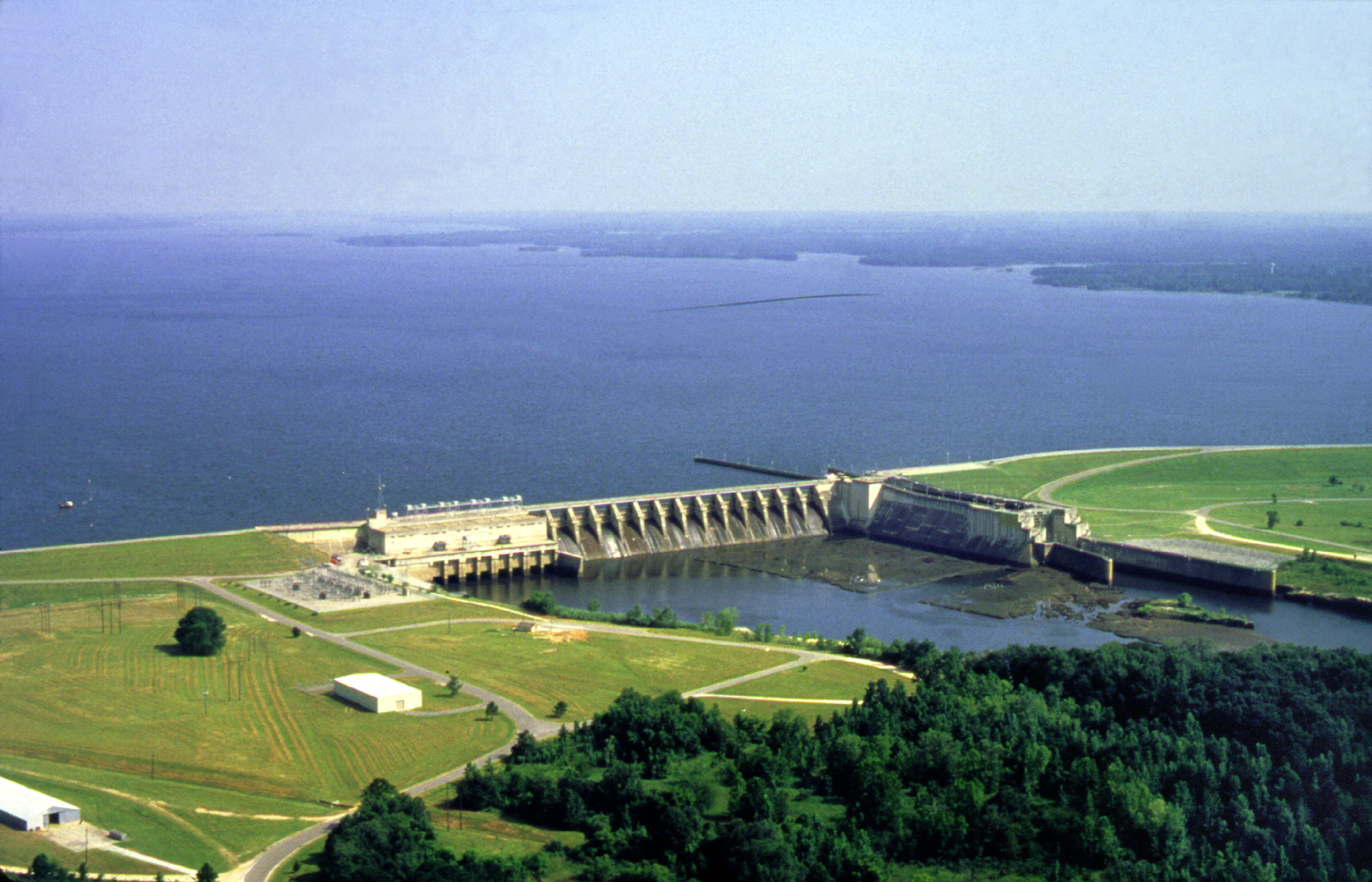
Walter F. George Lake located on the border between Georgia and Alabama. Senator Walter F. George '01, served in the United States Senate, 1922–57 and is the namesake of Mercer Law School. The lake was named in his honor in 1958.
