= Brainerd Currie =

Law professor and scholar

- Born: December 20, 1912
- Died: October 7, 1965 (aged 52)

Brainerd Currie (20 December 1912 – 7 September 1965) was a law professor noted for his work in conflict of laws and his creation of the concept of the governmental interests analysis. He was the father of law professor David P. Currie.

Currie received a Bachelor of Laws from the Walter F. George School of Law of Mercer University in 1935 followed by a liberal arts degree from Mercer in 1937. In 1941, he earned a Master of Laws degree from Columbia University.

Currie taught law at Mercer, Wake Forest College, University of Georgia Law School, Duke Law School, University of Chicago Law School, was part of the first faculty at UCLA Law School in 1949, and dean at University of Pittsburgh School of Law. He worked at the Office of Price Administration and Office of Economic Stabilization during World War II.

Since 1967, Duke Law has had an annual Brainerd Currie Memorial Lecture; the first speaker was California Supreme Court Justice Roger Traynor.

== See also ==
- Conflict of laws in the United States

Brainerd Currie is also considered the poet laureate of law professors, and penned the legal nonsense classic "The Rose of Aberlone" which you may read here.
