= Cathy Cox (American politician) =

American administrator and politician (born 1958)

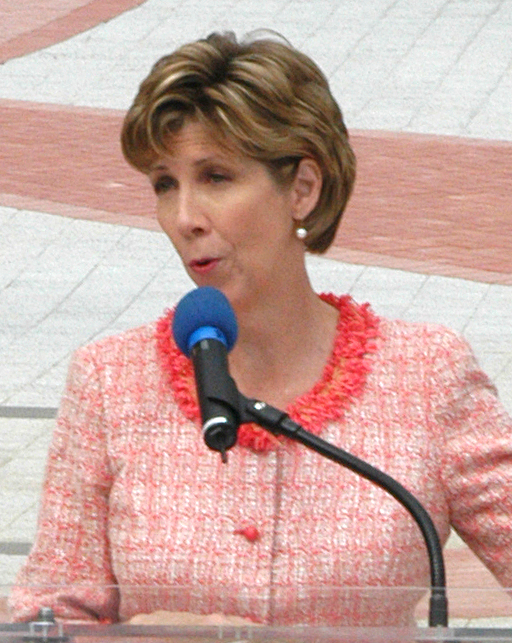
- Cox in 2005

President of Georgia College & State University
- Incumbent
- Assumed office October 2021

Dean of the Mercer University School of Law
- In office July 2017 – 2021
- Preceded by: Daisy Hurst Floyd

President of Young Harris College
- In office March 2007 – 2017
- Preceded by: John W. Wells
- Succeeded by: Drew L. Van Horn

25th Secretary of State of Georgia
- In office January 11, 1999 – January 13, 2007
- Governor: Roy Barnes; Sonny Perdue
- Preceded by: Lewis Massey
- Succeeded by: Karen Handel

Member of the Georgia House of Representatives from the 154th district
- In office 1993–1996

Personal details
- Born: Lera Catharine Cox; July 18, 1958 (age 68) Bainbridge, Georgia, U.S.
- Party: Democratic
- Spouse: Mark Dehler
- Education: Abraham Baldwin Agricultural College; University of Georgia; Mercer University
- Occupation: Academic administrator, lawyer, politician, journalist

Lera Catharine "Cathy" Cox (born July 18, 1958) is an American academic administrator and former lawyer, politician, and journalist. She is president of Georgia College & State University. Cox, a member of the Democratic Party, previously served as Secretary of State of Georgia, a candidate for Governor of Georgia in 2006, dean of Walter F. George School of Law at Mercer University, and as the 21st president of Young Harris College.

== Biography ==
Cox was born and raised in Bainbridge, Georgia. After attending public schools, she earned her associate's degree in agriculture from Abraham Baldwin Agricultural College. She later obtained her journalism degree from the University of Georgia. In 1986 she graduated magna cum laude from Mercer University's Walter F. George School of Law, where she was editor-in-chief of the Mercer Law Review and elected to the Brainerd Currie Honor Society. After graduation, she was a journalist for The Gainesville Times and The Post-Searchlight. She practiced law for ten years.

She is married to attorney Mark Dehler. They have no children and are active members of the United Methodist Church. She has also served on the Board of Trustees of Mercer University as well as on the Board of Visitors of the School of Law.

== Georgia House of Representatives ==
Cox served as a member of the Georgia House of Representatives from 1993 to 1996. She represented district 154, Miller, Seminole, Early and Decatur counties. She relinquished her seat in early 1996 to become Assistant Secretary of State and temporarily retired from elective office.

== Secretary of State ==
Cox ran for Georgia Secretary of State in 1998 and defeated Republican candidate John A. McCallum with 56.6% of the vote, becoming the 25th Secretary of State of Georgia and the first woman elected to the position. She was re-elected in 2002 with 61.1% of the vote (more than any other Georgia Democrat that year) against Republican candidate Charlie Bailey.

Cox took office in January 1999 and was the first woman to serve as Georgia's Secretary of State. Her first action in office was to move the largest division of her office from Atlanta to Macon, saying she "wanted to bring government closer to the people it serves." She also instituted a universal electronic voting system, making Georgia the first American state to use such a system. Governing Magazine honored her as one of the top Public Officials of the Year in 2002 for her election reform efforts, making her the first Secretary of State in the nation to be so recognized. Cox created the Georgia Invests initiative to combat fraudulent telephone investment schemes.

In 2004, Cox rejected 63 voter registration applications on the basis that they were submitted without following procedures then required by Georgia law. The procedures not followed included obtaining specific pre-clearance from the state to conduct their drive. A suit was filed, Charles H. Wesley Education Foundation v. Cathy Cox, on the basis that the rejection of the registrations violated the National Voter Registration Act of 1993 (NVRA) by undermining voter registration drives. A Senior U.S. District Judge upheld earlier federal court decisions in the case, finding against Cox, and deciding that private entities have a right under the NVRA to engage in organized voter registration activity in Georgia at times and locations of their choosing, without the presence or permission of state or local election officials.

== Gubernatorial candidacy ==
On December 27, 2004, in her hometown of Bainbridge, Cox announced her candidacy for governor of Georgia. In her announcement, she stated that she is "ready and willing to work with Republicans and Democrats alike to improve education, provide access to high quality health care, and promote economic development in every region of Georgia." Cox was opposed by fellow Democrat Mark Taylor, then lieutenant governor of Georgia, and Republican Sonny Perdue, the incumbent governor of Georgia. If elected, she would have become the first female governor of Georgia. She made an early commitment to marriage equality, but abandoned that position after the primary and while heading into the general election.

Cathy Cox lost the Democratic primary and then conceded defeat to Mark Taylor during a press conference at 12:00 am on July 19, 2006.

=== Wikipedia controversy ===
On April 26, 2006, the Atlanta Journal-Constitution reported that the Wikipedia biography of Mark Taylor, Cox's opponent in the 2006 Democratic gubernatorial primary, had been edited by someone using an IP address associated with the Cox gubernatorial campaign (69.15.227.237). According to the Associated Press, Wikipedia co-founder Jimmy Wales told reporters that the insertion of a paragraph based on opposition research relating to the arrest of Taylor's son on driving under the influence charges had been traced back to Cox's campaign, but said he had no way of knowing who made the change. After the story broke, Cox denied any knowledge of her campaign manager's alleged actions and said she had instructed her staff not to make the incident an issue. Cox's campaign manager, Morton Brilliant, resigned shortly after the incident was made public.

Bill Shipp reported in the Gwinnett Daily Post that Taylor's aides had known for months about the edits, which they easily traced to Cox's campaign. Taylor held back on publicizing the news until he could use it to upstage a speech by Cox that her staff called a "major policy address". The resulting media coverage gave much wider publicity to the problems of Taylor's son than the changes Brilliant made to Wikipedia.

== Post-Gubernatorial bid ==
After her unsuccessful gubernatorial run, Cox served a one-semester appointment as the Carl E. Sanders Political Leadership Scholar at the University of Georgia School of Law. As the Carl Sanders Scholar, she taught two courses, Election Law and Law and Politics, to second and third year law students.

The Carl E. Sanders Chair was established in 2002 by a $1 million gift to the University of Georgia School of Law by former Georgia governor and Chairman Emeritus of Atlanta-based law firm Troutman Sanders LLP (now merged with the Philadelphia-based Pepper Hamilton LLP to form Troutman Pepper Hamilton Sanders LLP). The gift resulted from Sanders' longstanding commitment to see the law school at the University of Georgia "be one of such excellence that no citizen of Georgia need ever leave the state because a superior legal education is afforded elsewhere.".

On May 12, 2007, Cox gave the commencement address to the graduating class of Mercer University's Walter F. George School of Law, her law school alma mater. During the ceremony, she was awarded the honorary degree, Doctor of Laws.

From 2007 through 2017, she was the 21st president of Young Harris College in Young Harris, GA. In 2017 she became the dean of the Walter F. George School of Law at Mercer University in Macon, GA, a position she held until being elected president of Georgia College & State University in Milledgeville, GA, by the state university system's board of regents. She assumed the presidency of Georgia College on October 1, 2021.

Party political offices
| Preceded by Lewis A. Massey | Democratic nominee for Secretary of State of Georgia; 1998, 2002 | Succeeded by Gail Buckner |
Georgia House of Representatives
| Preceded by Ralph Balkcom | Member of the Georgia House of Representatives from the 160th district 1993–1996 | Succeeded by Dan Ponder |
Political offices
| Preceded by Lewis Massey | Secretary of State of Georgia; 1999–2007 | Succeeded by Karen Handel |
Academic offices
| Preceded by John Wells | President of Young Harris College; 2007–2017 | Succeeded by C Brooks Seay |
Academic offices
| Preceded by Steve Dorman | President of Georgia College & State University; 2021–Present | Succeeded by |
