= Kathy Cox =

Kathy Cox may refer to:

- Kathy Cox (American politician) (born 1964)
- Kathy Cox (skydiver)

== See also ==
- Cathy Cox (disambiguation)
- Katherine Cox (disambiguation)
