= A Total Waste of Makeup =

2005 chick lit novel by Kim Gruenenfelder

- First edition
- Author: Kim Gruenenfelder
- Series: Charlize (series)
- Genre: Chick lit
- Publisher: St. Martin's Press
- Publication date: 2005
- Pages: 359
- ISBN: 0-312-34872-X
- Followed by: Misery Loves Cabernet

A Total Waste of Makeup is a 2005 chick lit novel by Kim Gruenenfelder. The book was an international bestseller, spawning copies in six languages and eight international editions. The book follows Charlize "Charlie" Edwards, a personal assistant in Los Angeles to famed movie star Drew Stanton, and her adventures with her friends. A sequel to the novel, Misery Loves Cabernet, was released in 2009.

== Reception ==
The book received generally favorable reviews from critics and audiences. Kirkus Reviews spoke positively in their review, stating, "The honesty of emotion they share is refreshing. Gruenenfelder’s debut supplies a splendid vacation from reality." Library Journal praised the book for Gruenenfelder's Hollywood realism: "Gruenenfelder, a Hollywood screenwriter, knows her setting and her craft. Well-written characters and a wicked sense of humor help this debut stand above the usual chick-lit fare."

== See also ==
- Kim Gruenenfelder
- Women's fiction
- Romantic comedy
