= Frank E. Sheeder III =

Frank E. Sheeder III is an American lawyer in health care enforcement, compliance, and healthcare fraud, waste and abuse litigation.

== Education and professional background ==
He has been quoted regarding health care fraud and compliance matters in The New York Times and Modern Healthcare.

== Writings ==
Sheeder's work has been published in the Journal of Health Care Compliance, Compliance Today, Health Lawyers News, Journal of Health and Life Sciences Law

He is the author of Corporate Governance and Compliance for Health Care: A Practical Guide, Wolters Kluwer; Lslf/Cdr edition (2007). He has been a contributing author to the Health Care Compliance Professional's Manual. Sheeder has also authored a quarterly Corporate Culture column in the Journal of Health Care Compliance. Sheeder's writings are used in the Health Care Compliance curriculum of the Hamline University School of Law. His work has also been cited internationally in law journals.

== Recognition ==
Sheeder was named the Best Lawyers in America's 2013 Dallas Health Care Law "Lawyer of the Year." In 2011 and 2012, the Ethisphere Institute named him to its list of "Health Care Attorneys Who Matter." He has been listed in Chambers USA many years a row; The Best Lawyers in America for several years; and Texas Super Lawyers (2006–present); He was named by Nightingale's Healthcare News in its list of: "Outstanding Healthcare Fraud and Compliance Lawyers — 2007." He has been ranked AV Preeminent, 5.0 out of 5, by Martindale-Hubbell.
