= Benchbook =

A benchbook is a book providing an overview of legal procedure for a judge. These books are used by judges while hearing cases as guides to assist in the disposition of a case. A benchbook is not a source of substantive law but rather a guide to procedure. Benchbooks are used in conjunction with manuals on civil procedure, criminal procedure, and evidence to assist the judge in trial. Benchbooks are also published on more narrow technical areas of law that may come before the judge, e.g. domestic law, public health law, etc.

The term may also apply to materials prepared in anticipation of hearing a particular case or set of cases. Such a benchbook often contains documents related to the case and relevant legal authority. This meaning is most commonly used in reference to appellate court judges, who may prepare a benchbook for each day's argument session. At a trial court, this document is often a shorter bench memorandum.
