= The Long Whip =

1934 novel by Eugene Campbell

- Author: Eugene Campbell
- Publisher: Charles Scribner's Sons
- Publication date: 1934
- Pages: 361

The Long Whip is a 1934 novel by Eugene Campbell. Subverting the rags to riches trope of the era, the novel documents the fall of a family fortune and analyzes the impacts of inheritance on wealthy people. The Long Whip took heavy influence, especially in its depiction of horse racing, from Campbell's experiences as the Secretary of the New York State Racing Commission. The novel received positive reviews from contemporary critics, and has since become a rare book and valuable collector's item.
