= Womble Bond Dickinson (US) LLP =

American law firm (founded 1876)

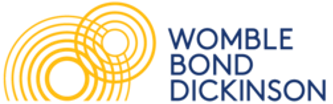
- No. of offices: 31 (US), 39 (global)
- No. of attorneys: 860 (US), 1,300 (global)
- Major practice areas: General practice
- Key people: Merrick Benn, Chair and CEO (US)
- Company type: Limited liability partnership
- Website: https://www.womblebonddickinson.com/us

Womble Bond Dickinson (US) is an American multinational law firm founded in 1876. In 2017, an agreement between UK-based Bond Dickinson LLP and US-based Womble Carlyle Sandridge & Rice, LLP created Womble Bond Dickinson, which now has more than 1,300 lawyers and is ranked in the Am Law 100. Womble Bond Dickinson (US) LLP and Womble Bond Dickinson (UK) LLP operate as separate legal entities with non-profit-sharing partners.

== History ==
The firm was founded in 1876 by William Bynum Glenn and Cyrus Barksdale Watson to serve the growing tobacco business in Winston, North Carolina. The firm had several names before becoming Womble Carlyle Sandridge & Rice, PLLC in 1954. Bunyan Snipes Womble, a senior partner with Womble Carlyle until his death in 1976, headed the committee that drove the 1913 consolidation of Winston and Salem into a single city.

In the 1980s, the firm expanded in North Carolina with new offices in Raleigh and Charlotte, followed by the opening of an Atlanta office in 1993 and Washington, D.C., in 1998 that both grew through subsequent mergers.

=== International growth ===
In 2017, Womble Carlyle combined with UK firm Bond Dickinson after working together in an alliance for more than a year. The two firms operate with independent management and a global board that was established after the combination and oversees cooperation between the British and American operations.

=== Recent growth ===
Womble Bond Dickinson (US) has continued to grow in large and mid-sized cities. In January 2025, the firm combined with Lewis Roca Rothgerber Christie, adding approximately 220 lawyers. A smaller merger with San Francisco’s Cooper, White & Cooper in 2022 and the addition of a 20-lawyer team in Nashville from Neal & Harwell in 2025 also contributed to the firm’s domestic growth, which saw a 42% increase in gross revenue from 2017 to 2023.

== Leadership ==
Betty Temple, who served as Chair and CEO of Womble Bond Dickinson (US) from 2017 to 2024, was the firm’s first female leader and oversaw the implementation of the Bond Dickinson combination. Merrick Benn currently serves as US Chair and CEO.

== Notable attorneys & alumni ==
- Jeff Jackson — Attorney General of North Carolina (2025-Present), First U.S. House Representative for North Carolina’s 14th District (2023 -2024)
- Deborah J. Israel — Associate Judge on the Superior Court of the District of Columbia (2019 -Present)
- Joe Whitley — First General Counsel for the US Department of Homeland Security (2003 -2005)
- Charles B. Tanksley — Five-term member of the Georgia Senate (1995-2004)
- Jim Hunt — Governor of North Carolina (1977-1985; 1993-2001)
- Irving E. Carlyle — Chaired a commission on North Carolina higher education enrollment (1961-1962), which contributed to the creation of the North Carolina Community Colleges System
- Robert B. Glenn — Governor of North Carolina (1905-1909)
