= Joe Whitley =

American lawyer (born 1950)

Joe D. Whitley
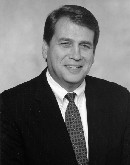

General Counsel of the United States Department of Homeland Security
- In office July 31, 2003 – May 18, 2005
- President: George W. Bush
- Preceded by: Position established
- Succeeded by: Philip Perry

United States Attorney for the Northern District of Georgia
- In office June 1990 – November 1993
- President: George H. W. Bush
- Preceded by: Bob Barr
- Succeeded by: Kent Barron Alexander

United States Attorney for the Middle District of Georgia
- In office September 1981 – February 1987
- President: Ronald Reagan
- Preceded by: D. Lee Rampey Jr.
- Succeeded by: Edgar W. Ennis Jr.

Personal details
- Born: Joe Dally Whitley; November 12, 1950 (age 75) Atlanta, Georgia, U.S.
- Party: Republican
- Spouse: Kathleen Pinion
- Education: University of Georgia (BA, JD)

Joe Dally Whitley (born November 12, 1950) is an American lawyer from Georgia who was the first General Counsel for the United States Department of Homeland Security. He works in private practice at Womble Bond Dickinson (US) LLP and has been named a Super Lawyer, listed in The Best Lawyers in America®, named a ‘’2019 Lawyer of the Year’’, is AV® Preeminent™ Peer Review Rated by Martindale-Hubbell, and listed in Chambers USA: America's Leading Business Lawyers.

== Background ==
During the George H. W. Bush administration, Whitley served as the Acting United States Associate Attorney General, the third-ranking position in the United States Department of Justice. Under President Ronald Reagan, he was the U.S. Attorney in the Middle District of Georgia, and under President George H. W. Bush, Whitley served as the U.S. Attorney in the Northern and Middle Districts of Georgia in Atlanta. At the time of his appointment he was youngest person ever to be appointed a U.S. Attorney and only person to ever serve as U.S. Attorney for two separate federal jurisdictions.

== Private Practice ==
Prior to joining the Department of Homeland Security, and immediately following his service at DHS, Whitley was a partner at Alston & Bird, where he served as head of the firm's White Collar Government Enforcement & Investigations Group, his practice concentrating on government investigations, environmental and health care fraud and complex civil litigation.

Whitley is the former Chair of the Section of Administrative Law & Regulatory Practice of the American Bar Association. He is a former council member of the Criminal Justice Section of the American Bar Association. He served as Vice Chair for Governmental Affairs of the 2002–03 ABA Criminal Justice Section. He also chairs annual seminars and institutes of continuing education on White Collar Crime, Health Care Fraud, the Foreign Corrupt Practices Act, Internal Investigations and Cybercrime. Whitley co-chairs the ABA's Annual National Homeland Security Law Institute in Washington, DC.

== Education and Teaching ==
Whitley received his bachelor's degree, cum laude, from the University of Georgia in 1972, and a J.D., cum laude, in 1975 from the University of Georgia School of Law. He currently serves on the Board of Visitors for the University of Georgia School of Public and International Affairs and as Non-Resident Fellow at The Center for International Trade & Security (CITS) at the University of Georgia. He has been adjunct professor at the George Washington University Law School, and adjunct professor at the American University Washington College of Law, teaching homeland security law at both.

== Bar Admissions ==
Whitley is licensed to practice law in Georgia and the District of Columbia.

== Publications and Presentations ==
Whitley is a frequent author, and a frequent speaker and lecturer at institutions, events and seminars, including, without limitation, the following.

=== Publications ===
- Homeland Security: Legal and Policy Issues, with Lynne K. Zusman, book published by the American Bar Association
- Co-Author, "The Case for Reevaluating DOJ Policies on Prosecuting White Collar Crime," Washington Legal Foundation, Critical Legal Issues, No. 108, May 2002
- Author, "Business Continuity", Directors & Boards, February 2006
- Author, "Homeland Security: Preparing for Legal and Policy Changes," Bloomberg Corporate Law Journal, Winter 2006
- Author, "Homeland Security After Hurricane Katrina: Where Do We Go From Here," Natural Resources & Environment, June 6, 2006
- Author, "The SAFETY Act: A Vital Tool In The Fight Against Terrorism," Contemporary Legal Notes, November 2006
- Author, "New Federal Rule Dictating Anti-Terrorism Standards for Chemical Facilities," Washington Legal Foundation Contemporary Legal Series, June 2007
- Author, "Critical Infrastructure," American Bar Association Homeland Security and National Defense Newsletter, Fall 2007
- Author, "The ICE-Man Cometh: Crackdown of Immigration in the Meat Processing Industry," American Bar Association Homeland Security and National Defense Newsletter, Fall 2007
- Author, "Chemical Security: Recent Regulation and the Impact on the Private Sector," New Jersey Law Journal, Fall 2007
- Author, "Recent Developments in Critical Infrastructure Protection," The Real Estate Finance Journal, Fall 2007
- Co-author – "Homeland Security and Domestic Intelligence: Legal Considerations," The U.S. Intelligence Community Law Sourcebook, American Bar Association, 2011 Edition (August 2011)
- "Judge Approves New Scheduling Order in Expedia Case," Ledger-Enquirer (February 2012)
- Quoted – "Likely FBI Nominee to Face NSA Debate," The Wall Street Journal (June 2013)
- Quoted – "The Morning Risk Report: Drop in FCPA Independent Monitors Continues in 2013," The Wall Street Journal (July 2013)
- Co-author – "Lessons for General Counsel from Recent Cyberattack on the U.S. Office of Personnel Management," Daily Report (August 2015)
- "WLF Overcriminalization Timeline:Deferred-Prosecution and Non-Prosecution Agreements, Washington Legal Foundation (November 2015)
- Co-author – "Creating Value in FCPA Investigations Through Increasing Cooperation Credit," FCPA Report (January 2016)
- Co-author – "What To Do Before Government Agents Come Knocking," Attorney at Law Magazine, Vol. 5 No. 1 (March 2016)
- Co-author – "How to Value Compliance Programs, Internal Investigations," Daily Report (July 2016)
- Co-author – "Cybersecurity Public Private Partnerships: Challenges and Opportunities, Cybersecurity Law & Strategy (February 2017)
- Co-author – "INSIGHT: The Looming Litigation Buried in the Mueller Report," Bloomberg Law (March 2019)

=== Presentations ===
- Joe D. Whitley On the C-SPAN Networks
- ABA 10th Annual ADMINISTRATIVE LAW & REGULATORY PRACTICE INSTITUTE (Section Chair – Joe D. Whitley)
- "National Institute on White Collar Crime" (March 2019)
- The National Security Institute, Antonin Scalia Law School, George Mason University
- "Ethical Guidance in the Corporate Board Room," American Bar Association (ABA)
- Southeastern White Collar Crime Institute (September 2018)
- American Bar Association (ABA) Regional Southeastern White Collar Crime Institute (September 2018)
- "National Institute on Health Care Fraud" (May 2018)
- "Federal Bar Association's Current Issues in Government Investigations" (April 2018)
- "The 32nd Annual National Institute on White Collar Crime" (February 2018)
- "Georgia ICLE Health Care Fraud Institute" (December 2017)
- "Health Care Fraud Institute" Institute of Continuing Legal Education (December 2017)
- "Baker Donelson Compliance Symposium" (November 2017)
- "Cybercon 2017" (October 2017)
- "The Role of Lawyers in Cybersecurity," Homeland Security Law Institute, George Washington University, Washington D.C. (September 2017)
- "The State of Homeland Security and the Rule of Law," National Security Program and the National Security Law Association, George Washington University Law School, Washington, D.C. (September 2017)
- "ABA Criminal Justice Section's Southeast White Collar Crime Institute" (September 2017)
- Panelist – "2017 NACUA Annual Conference" (June 2017)
- "Cybercon 2016" (September 2016)
