= Cittie of Yorke =

Listed pub in Holborn, London, England

Cittie of York
- The pub in 2025
- Former names: Henekey's / Henneky's Long Bar

General information
- Type: Public house
- Architectural style: Tudor Revival
- Location: 22 High Holborn, Holborn, London, England
- Coordinates: 51°31′06″N 0°06′46″W
- Year built: 1923–1924; 102 years ago
- Owner: Womble Bond Dickinson (Trust Corporation) Ltd

Design and construction
- Architect: Ernest R. Barrow (probable)
- Designations

Listed Building – Grade II
- Official name: Cittie of Yorke public house
- Designated: 14 May 1974
- Reference no.: 1378857

Website
- cittieofyorkeholborn.co.uk

The Cittie of Yorke is a Grade II listed public house on High Holborn in Holborn, London, England. The present building was constructed in 1923–24, probably to the designs of Ernest R. Barrow, on a site occupied by licensed premises since at least 1430. Rebuilt in a Tudor Revival style, it retains brick cellars that may date from a 17th-century coffeehouse formerly on the site. The pub is noted for its large hall-like interior and is included in CAMRA's National Inventory of Historic Pub Interiors, where it holds a three-star rating for an interior of "outstanding national historic importance".

== History ==
The building is a public house dating largely from 1923–24, probably designed by Ernest R. Barrow, and replaced an earlier wine shop operated by G. Henekey & Co. Although the present building dates from a rebuilding of the 1920s, a pub has occupied the site since at least 1430. The premises later served as a coffeehouse in the 17th century, and the surviving brick cellars may date from that period.

On 14 May 1974, the Cittie of Yorke was designated a Grade II listed building. It was included on the Campaign for Real Ale (CAMRA)'s National Inventory of Historic Pub Interiors before the inventory's grading system was revised. Under the revised scheme, it is rated three stars and its interior is regarded as being "of outstanding national historic importance".

The pub was originally part of the Henekey's chain, which had been established in 1831. By the 1970s the company had become part of the Trusthouse Forte group. As Trusthouse Forte disposed of a number of its public houses in the late 1970s, the Cittie of Yorke was among those acquired by Samuel Smith's Old Brewery around 1979.

The Welsh poet Dylan Thomas penned an impromptu ode to the pub when it was called Henneky's Long Bar. Fred Jarvis, a former general secretary of the National Union of Teachers, found the previously unknown poem in 2014 while going through papers belonging to his late parents-in-law who knew Thomas. The top of the poem reads "This little song was written in Henneky's Long Bar High Holborn by Dylan Thomas in 1951". Orion Publishing Group planned to include the song in a new edition of collected Thomas poems in October 2014.

As of March 2026, the pub's freehold was owned by Womble Bond Dickinson (Trust Corporation) Ltd and it is leased, managed and operated by Samuel Smith's.

== Architecture ==
=== Exterior ===
The building has a façade faced in Portland stone with small-paned windows, while the side and rear walls are built of stock brick and contain timber-framed windows. The roofs are tiled. Its design draws on Tudor Revival influences.

The building has four storeys above a cellar. The front elevation is symmetrical and arranged in two matching halves. At ground-floor level there are entrances at either end, with windows between them above a timber panelled base, some of which have been altered. Above, shallow projecting bays rise through two floors on each side of the frontage, ending beneath a horizontal band supported by decorative brackets. The upper floor contains single mullioned windows and is finished with a parapet incorporating two small ornamental gables. A large clock, mounted on a decorative bracket, occupies the centre of the façade between the first and second floors.

=== Interior ===
The interior in 2025

The main entrance is on the right and opens into a broad stone-floored passage lined with timber arches. At the front is a more conventional bar with timber panelling to the lower walls, while beyond lies a large hall-like room designed to evoke a medieval interior, with exposed timberwork, dark wood finishes, high-level windows and a large eastern bay window. Beneath the upper windows are three arches of varying sizes leading to a series of small private seating compartments.

Along the western side runs the long bar counter, above which is a gallery supported on slender cast-iron columns, probably of Victorian date; a second gallery above provides access to storage areas and is enclosed by an iron handrail. Notable fittings include Victorian-style seating cubicles and a freestanding triangular cast-iron stove bearing the initials "TIK", said to have come from Gray's Inn and dating from about 1815.
