= Quentin Skinner =

British historian (born 1940)

Quentin Skinner FBA
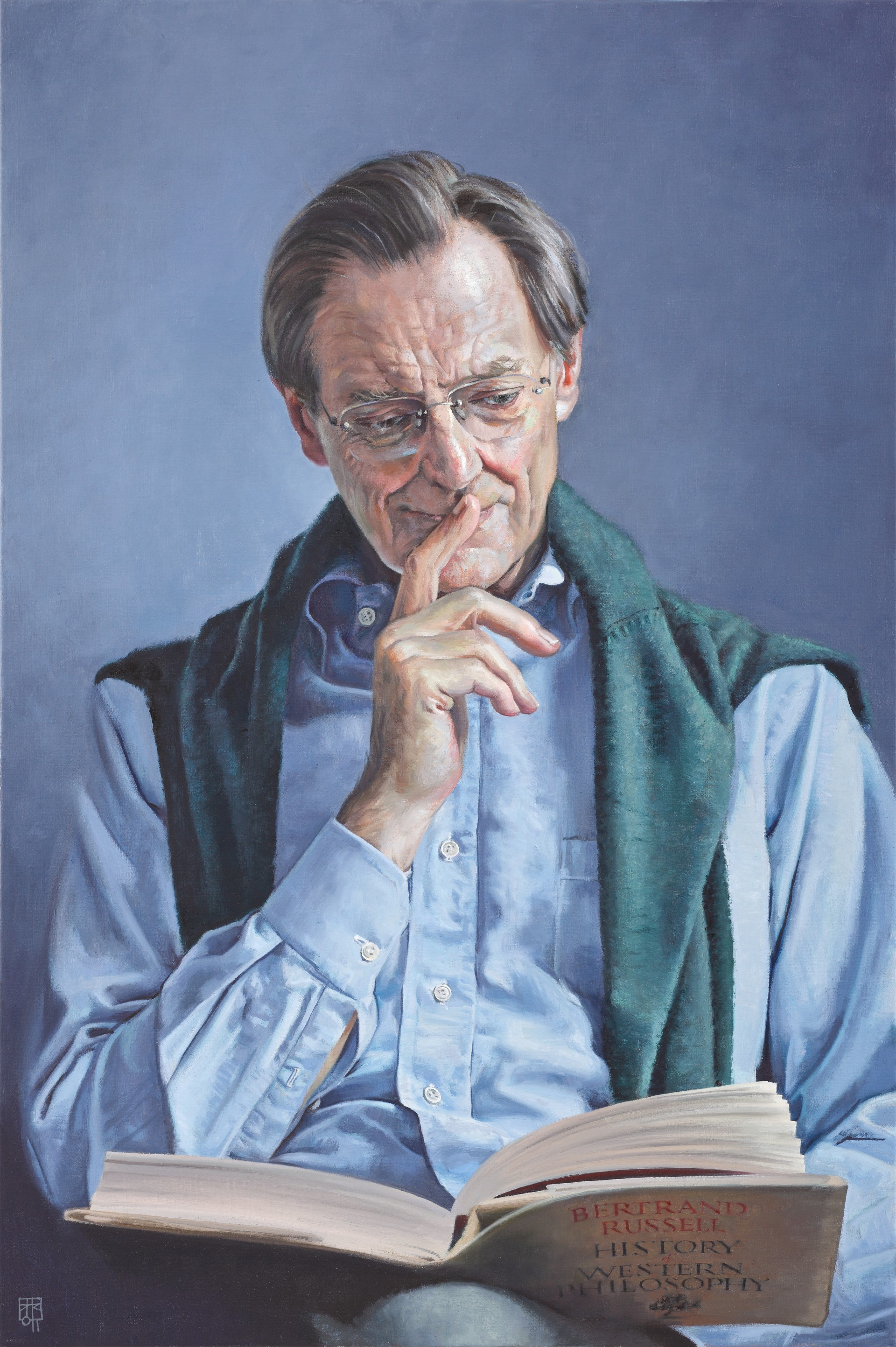
- Skinner by David Cobley (2011)
- Born: Quentin Robert Duthie Skinner; 26 November 1940 (age 85); Oldham, England
- Spouses: Patricia Law Skinner (div.); Susan James (m. 1979)
- Awards: Wolfson History Prize (1979); Balzan Prize (2006); Bielefelder Wissenschaftspreis (2008)

Academic background
- Education: Gonville and Caius College, Cambridge
- Influences: R. G. Collingwood; Peter Laslett; J. G. A. Pocock; Bertrand Russell; Keith Thomas; Ludwig Wittgenstein; J. L. Austin; John Dunn; Philip Pettit; Michel Foucault

Academic work
- Discipline: History; Philosophy; political science
- School or tradition: Cambridge School
- Institutions: Christ's College, Cambridge; Institute for Advanced Study; Queen Mary University of London
- Doctoral students: David Armitage; Mark Goldie; Karen Kupperman; Eric M. Nelson; James Tully; Peter N. Miller; Richard Tuck; Richard Bellamy (philosopher)
- Main interests: Early modern history; intellectual history; political philosophy; history of political thought; Reformation; Renaissance; Enlightenment; rhetoric
- Notable works: The Foundations of Modern Political Thought (1978); Reason and Rhetoric in the Philosophy of Thomas Hobbes (1996)
- Notable ideas: Cambridge School (intellectual history)
- Influenced: David Runciman; Raymond Geuss; David Armitage; Mark Goldie; Karen Kupperman; Eric M. Nelson; Philip Pettit; James Tully

Quentin Robert Duthie Skinner (born 26 November 1940) is a British intellectual historian. He is regarded as one of the founders of the Cambridge School of the history of political thought. He has won numerous prizes for his work, including the Wolfson History Prize in 1979 and the Balzan Prize in 2006. Between 1996 and 2008 he was Regius Professor of History at the University of Cambridge. He is the Emeritus Professor of the Humanities and Co-director of The Centre for the Study of the History of Political Thought at Queen Mary University of London.

== Biography ==
Quentin Skinner was born 26 November 1940 in Oldham, near Manchester, England, the second son of Alexander Skinner (died 1979) and Winifred Skinner, née Duthie (died 1982). Though his family background is Scottish, and his father spent his career in the civil service in West Africa, he was raised and educated in England. He was educated at Bedford School from the age of seven. Like his elder brother, he won an entrance scholarship to Gonville and Caius College, Cambridge, from where he graduated with a double-starred first in history in 1962. Skinner was elected to a fellowship of his college on his examination results, but moved later in 1962 to a teaching fellowship at Christ's College, Cambridge, where he remained until moving to the University of London in 2008. He is an Honorary Fellow of both Christ's College and Gonville and Caius College.

Skinner was appointed to a lectureship in the Faculty of History at the University of Cambridge in 1965. He spent a sabbatical year at the Institute for Advanced Study in Princeton in 1974–1975, where he was invited to stay, and where he remained until 1979 when he returned to Cambridge as Professor of Political Science. He was appointed to the post of Regius Professor of History in 1996, and in 1999 as pro-vice-chancellor of the university.

In 1966 he married Patricia Dwyer. They divorced in 1973. Since 1979 he has been married to Susan James, Professor Emerita of Philosophy at Birkbeck College London. They have two children and four grandchildren.

Skinner has held a number of visiting appointments. He has been Visiting Fellow at the Research School of Social Science at the Australian National University (1970, 1994, 2006); visiting professor at Washington University in St. Louis (1982); Directeur d’Etudes Associé at the Ecole des Hautes Etudes (1987); Professeur Associé at Université Paris X (1991); visiting professor at the University of Leuven (1992); visiting professor at Northwestern University (1995, 2011); Professeur invité at the Collège de France (1997); Fellow at Wissenschaftskolleg zu Berlin (2003–04); Visiting Scholar at the Center for European Studies at Harvard University (2008); Laurence Rockefeller Visiting Professor at Princeton University (2013–14); Spinoza Visiting Professor at the University of Amsterdam (2014); visiting professor in the Global Fellowship programme at Peking University, Beijing (2017); and visiting professor at the University of Chicago (2017).

== Awards and honors ==
Skinner has been a Fellow of the British Academy since 1981, and is also a foreign member of a number of national academies, including the American Academy of Arts and Sciences (1986), the Academia Europaea (1989), the American Philosophical Society (1997), the Royal Irish Academy (1999), the Accademia Nazionale dei Lincei (2007), the Österreichische Akademie der Wissenschaften (2009), and the Royal Danish Academy (2015). He has been the recipient of honorary degrees from the University of Aberdeen, University of Athens, University of Chicago, University of Copenhagen, University of East Anglia, Harvard University, University of Helsinki, Katholieke Universiteit Leuven, University of Kent, University of Oslo, University of Oxford, Adolfo Ibáñez University (Santiago), University of St Andrews and Uppsala University. He was awarded the Wolfson History Prize in 1979, the Pilkington Teaching Prize by the University of Cambridge in 2001, the Sir Isaiah Berlin Prize of the British Political Studies Association in 2006, the Benjamin Lippincott Award (2001), the David Easton Award (2007) of the American Political Science Association, the Bielefeld Science Award (2008) and a Balzan Prize (2006). From 2009 until 2020, he was a member of the Balzan Prize Committee.

== Academia ==
=== Methodology ===
Skinner is regarded as one of the founders of the 'Cambridge School' of the history of political thought, best known for its attention to what J. G. A. Pocock has described as the 'languages' in which moral and political philosophy has been written. Skinner's contribution has been to articulate a theory of interpretation in which leading texts in the history of political theory are treated essentially as interventions in on-going political debates, and in which the main focus is on what individual writers may be said to have been doing in what they wrote.

This emphasis on political writing as a form of action derives from developments in ordinary language philosophy made by Ludwig Wittgenstein and J. L. Austin. Wittgenstein's insight was (in Skinner’s words) "that we should stop asking about the 'meanings' of words and focus instead on the various functions they are capable of performing in different language games". Skinner takes Austin to have extended Wittgenstein's argument in isolating the concept of a speech act, which is described by Skinner as the notion that "whenever we use language for purposes of communication, we are always doing something as well as saying something". According to Skinner, that means that any analysis is incomplete if it restricts itself to studying what a past thinker said on a given issue. Historians must also recover what a thinker hoped to achieve in saying it.

Skinner consequently proposes a form of linguistic contextualization that involves situating a text in relation to other texts and discourses. In that perspective, the text is a response to other thinkers, texts or cultural discourses. Skinner believes that ideas, arguments and texts should be placed in their original context. One consequence of this view is an emphasis on the necessity of studying less well-known political writers as a means of shedding light on the contemporary debates these classic texts contributed to. In that way, it becomes possible to decipher the original purpose of a text. To Skinner, texts are then seen as weapons or tools that can, for example, be used to support, discredit, or legitimize specific social and political arrangements. In its earlier versions this added up to a critique of the approach of an older generation, and particularly of Leo Strauss and his followers.

=== Empirical focus ===
Alongside his methodological contributions to the study of political thought, Skinner’s scholarship is empirically centered on early modern European political and intellectual history, with a particular emphasis on the development of ideas about liberty, the state, political obligation, and the nature of political authority.

A substantial body of his work is devoted to the recovery and interpretation of Renaissance and early modern republican political theory especially Italian civic humanism and to the historical analysis of the political languages used in debates about authority, citizenship, and constitutional government. He has played role in re-establishing the intellectual significance of figures such as Niccolò Machiavelli, and in situating early modern republican thought within its broader linguistic and cultural contexts.

Many of Skinner’s books address how political actors in early modern Europe articulated and contested concepts of freedom and tyranny, demonstrating that the conceptual frameworks of the time were shaped as much by rhetorical practice and legal tradition as by normative theory. For example, in The Foundations of Modern Political Thought (1978), Skinner traces the emergence of modern ideas of power, authority and liberty from the late Middle Ages through the seventeenth century, showing how shifts in political language reflected wider changes in social structures and statecraft.

More recently his work has focused particularly on changing concepts of civil and political liberty, and especially on the shift from the view that liberty consists in not being subject to arbitrary power to the currently widespread belief that it simply consists in absence of restraint. He briefly introduced this argument in Liberty before liberalism (1998), and fully developed it in Liberty as independence (2025).

He has also written extensively on the history of rhetoric and its role in political argument, and on the political thought of Thomas Hobbes. These interests gave rise to a sequence of works mainly focused on Hobbes, including Reason and rhetoric in the philosophy of Hobbes (1996), Hobbes and republican liberty (2008) and From Humanism to Hobbes (2018).

Across his books and essays, Skinner has combined meticulous historical scholarship with a deep concern for how political concepts were used in practice, demonstrating that the languages of early modern politics were themselves instruments of power, persuasion and institutional change.

=== Named lectures ===
Skinner has delivered lecture series at numerous universities, including the Gauss Seminars at Princeton University (1980), the Carlyle Lectures at the University of Oxford (1980), the Messenger Lectures at Cornell University (1983), the Tanner Lectures at Harvard University (1984), the Ford Lectures at the University of Oxford (2003), the Page–Barbour Lectures at University of Virginia (2003), the Adorno Lectures at University of Frankfurt (2005), the Robert P. Benedict Lectures at Boston University (2005), the Clarendon Lectures at the University of Oxford (2011), and the Clark Lectures at University of Cambridge (2015).

== Miscellany ==
When Skinner was interviewed by Alan Macfarlane, as part of his series of online conversations with academics, Skinner admitted that he had been a member of the Cambridge Apostles, a secret debating society at Cambridge University. He also revealed that Amartya Sen was a member at the same time. Sen mentioned their membership of the Apostles in his memoir Home in the World. He commented that they had both been "outed" in a book published about the Apostles sometime before.

On 6 October 1995, Skinner's Foundations of Modern Political Thought was included in the list published by The Times Literary Supplement of 'The 100 Most Influential Books since World War II'.

On 14 May 2009, Times Higher Education, in an article about Skinner's move from Cambridge to the University of London, spoke of Skinner's republicanism, reporting that this led him to refuse a knighthood he was offered when he became Regius Professor of History at Cambridge.

The Balzan-Skinner Lectureship, renamed the "Quentin Skinner Fellowship in Intellectual History since 1500", was established in 2009 at the University of Cambridge. The Quentin Skinner fellow holds a visiting fellowship at the Centre for Research in the Arts, Social Sciences and Humanities for one term of the academic year, which culminates in the Quentin Skinner Lecture and an associated symposium.

== Selected publications ==
=== Books ===
- The Foundations of Modern Political Thought: Volume I: The Renaissance, Cambridge University Press, 1978. ISBN 978-0-521-29337-2 (Translated into Arabic, Chinese, French, Greek, Italian, Korean, Japanese, Persian, Portuguese, Russian, Spanish, Turkish.)
- The Foundations of Modern Political Thought: Volume II: The Age of Reformation, Cambridge University Press, 1978. ISBN 978-0-521-29435-5 (Translated into Arabic, Chinese, French, Greek, Italian, Japanese, Persian, Portuguese, Russian, Spanish.)
- Machiavelli, Oxford University Press, 1981.
- Machiavelli: A Very Short Introduction [A revised version of 3(a)], Oxford University Press, 2000. ISBN 978-0-19-285407-0 (Translated into Albanian, Arabic, Chinese, Czech, French, German, Greek, Hebrew, Hungarian, Indonesian, Italian, Japanese, Korean, Kurdish, Malay, Polish, Persian, Portuguese, Romanian, Russian, Spanish, Swedish, Turkish.)
- Machiavelli: A Very Short Introduction [a new and updated edition of 3(b)], Oxford University Press, 2019. ISBN 978-0-19-883757-2
- Reason and Rhetoric in the Philosophy of Hobbes, Cambridge University Press, 1996. ISBN 978-0-521-59645-9 (Translated into Chinese, Italian, Portuguese.)
- Liberty before Liberalism, Cambridge University Press, 1998. ISBN 978-1-107-68953-4 (Translated into Chinese, French, Greek, Italian, Korean, Persian, Polish, Portuguese, Russian, Spanish, and Turkish.)
- Visions of Politics: Volume I: Regarding Method, Cambridge University Press, 2002. ISBN 978-0-521-58926-0 (Translated into Chinese, French, Greek, Italian, Korean, Persian, Polish, Portuguese, Spanish.)
- Visions of Politics: Volume II: Renaissance Virtues (with 12 colour plates), Cambridge University Press, 2002. ISBN 978-0-521-58926-0 (Translated into Chinese, Italian, and Polish.)
- Visions of Politics: Volume III: Hobbes and Civil Science, Cambridge University Press, 2002. ISBN 978-0-521-89060-1
- L’artiste en philosophie politique (with 8 colour plates), Editions de Seuil, Paris, 2003. ISBN 978-2-912107-15-2
- Hobbes and Republican Liberty (with 19 illustrations), Cambridge University Press, 2008. ISBN 978-2-912107-15-2 (Translated into Chinese, French, German, Portuguese, Spanish.)
- La verité et l’historien, ed. Christopher Hamel, Editions EHESS, Paris, 2011. ISBN 978-2-7132-2368-6
- Die drei Körper des Staates, Wallstein, Göttingen, 2012. ISBN 978-3-8353-1157-2
- Forensic Shakespeare, Oxford University Press, 2014. ISBN 978-0-19-955824-7 (Translated into Chinese.)
- From Humanism to Hobbes: Studies in Rhetoric and Politics (with 45 illustrations), Cambridge University Press, 2018. ISBN 978-1-107-56936-2
- Liberty as independence: the making and unmaking of a political ideal, Cambridge University Press, 2025. ISBN 978-1-107-02773-2

Academic offices
Preceded by Patrick Collinson	Regius Professor of Modern History at the University of Cambridge; 1996–2008	Succeeded by Richard J. Evans
Awards
Preceded by Alistair Horne	Wolfson History Prize; 1979; With: Richard Cobb and the Lady Soames	Succeeded by R. J. W. Evans
Preceded by Alistair Horne	Wolfson History Prize; 1979; With: Richard Cobb and the Lady Soames	Succeeded by F. S. L. Lyons
Preceded by Peter Grant	Balzan Prize; 2006; With: Paolo de Bernardis, Ludwig Finscher, Andrew E. Lange, Elliot Meyerowitz, and Chris R. Somerville	Succeeded by Bruce Beutler
Preceded by Rosemary Grant	Balzan Prize; 2006; With: Paolo de Bernardis, Ludwig Finscher, Andrew E. Lange, Elliot Meyerowitz, and Chris R. Somerville	Succeeded by Karlheinz Böhm
Preceded by Peter Hall	Balzan Prize; 2006; With: Paolo de Bernardis, Ludwig Finscher, Andrew E. Lange, Elliot Meyerowitz, and Chris R. Somerville	Succeeded by The Lady Higgins
Preceded by Russell J. Hemley	Balzan Prize; 2006; With: Paolo de Bernardis, Ludwig Finscher, Andrew E. Lange, Elliot Meyerowitz, and Chris R. Somerville	Succeeded by Jules A. Hoffmann
Preceded by Lothar Ledderose	Balzan Prize; 2006; With: Paolo de Bernardis, Ludwig Finscher, Andrew E. Lange, Elliot Meyerowitz, and Chris R. Somerville	Succeeded by Sumio Iijima
Preceded by Ho-Kwang Mao	Balzan Prize; 2006; With: Paolo de Bernardis, Ludwig Finscher, Andrew E. Lange, Elliot Meyerowitz, and Chris R. Somerville	Succeeded by Michel Zink
Preceded by Ronald Dworkin	Bielefeld Science Award; 2008	Succeeded by Hans Joas
