= Lewis Roca Rothgerber Christie =

Law firm based in Phoenix, Arizona

- Headquarters: Phoenix, Arizona
- No. of offices: 10
- No. of attorneys: 300+
- Major practice areas: Corporate and financial services and securities, environmental and natural resources, litigation, intellectual property
- Key people: Ken Van Winkle, managing partner
- Date founded: 1950
- Company type: LLP
- Website: www.lewisroca.com

Lewis Roca Rothgerber Christie was a U.S. law firm with approximately 300 attorneys with offices in Arizona, California, Colorado, Nevada, and New Mexico. Its administrative offices were located in Phoenix, where it was founded in 1950 as Lewis & Roca.

On January 1, 2025, the firm combined with Womble Bond Dickinson, with the combined firm operating under the Womble Bond Dickinson name.

The firm has handled pro bono cases including Miranda v. Arizona, 384 U.S. 436 (1966), in which partners John P. Frank, John Flynn and others represented Ernesto Miranda in the landmark US Supreme Court case, giving rise to "Miranda Rights."

== Practice areas ==
Lewis Roca Rothgerber Christie organized its work through five primary practice groups: litigation, intellectual property, business transactions, gaming law, and regulatory and government relations. Litigation was the firm's largest group, handling commercial disputes in state and federal trial and appellate courts as well as administrative tribunals, with lawyers practicing in areas including insurance, labor and employment, product liability, appellate, and real estate litigation. Its second-largest group, intellectual property, covered patent, trademark, copyright, and trade secret prosecution and litigation, and many of its attorneys held science or engineering degrees.

The firm was also known for its gaming law practice, which advised casino operators, equipment suppliers, and tribal, state, and local governments on matters including Native American gaming, racinos, and interactive gaming. It maintained government relations practices in Arizona, Colorado, and Nevada.

== History ==
The firm was founded in Phoenix as Lewis and Roca, by Orme Lewis and Paul Roca in 1950, with clients in Arizona and the southwest. The firm grew to 180 lawyers with offices in Phoenix, Tucson, Las Vegas, Reno, Albuquerque and Silicon Valley, and practices within litigation, real estate and business transactions, natural resources, gaming, intellectual property, and bankruptcy.

In 2013 the firm merged with Denver-based Rothgerber Johnson & Lyons, which has operated in the Rocky Mountain region since 1903 with 75 lawyers and offices in Denver, Colorado Springs and Casper, and practice areas in litigation, real estate, banking, insurance, energy infrastructure and religious institutions. The merged firm was renamed Lewis Roca Rothgerber LLP.

On January 1, 2016, Lewis Roca Rothgerber combined with Christie, Parker & Hale, a Los Angeles-based intellectual property firm, to become Lewis Roca Rothgerber Christie LLP. Founded in 1954 by James Christie, Robert Parker and Russell Hale, CPH had included about 40 attorneys in Los Angeles and Orange County and had handled patent work for SpaceShipOne, the first privately funded human space flight, among other clients.

In September 2024, Lewis Roca Rothgerber Christie and Womble Bond Dickinson announced that the two firms would merge effective January 1, 2025, creating a firm of more than 1,300 lawyers across 37 offices in the United States and the United Kingdom, operating under the Womble Bond Dickinson name. The combined firms reported prior-year gross revenue exceeding $742 million. Lewis Roca managing partner Kenneth Van Winkle became vice chair of the combined firm.

=== Notable alumni ===
Notable alumni of the firm include former Wyoming Governor and ambassador to Ireland Mike Sullivan; former Arizona Governor and Secretary of the U.S. Department of Homeland Security Janet Napolitano; Honolulu civil rights attorney David Schutter; and James Lyons, who was Special Advisor to the President and Secretary of State for Economic Initiatives in Ireland and Northern Ireland.

Notable judicial alumni include Ninth Circuit Court of Appeals Judge Mary M. Schroeder, United States District Court for the District of Arizona Judge John C. Hinderaker, former Arizona Supreme Court Chief Justice Scott Bales, and Arizona Court of Appeals Judges David Gass and David Weinzweig.

Phoenix lawyers John Paul Frank and John J. Flynn of Lewis and Roca and others represented Ernesto Miranda on a pro bono basis, which led to the landmark Miranda v. Arizona decision on June 13, 1966 in which the U.S. Supreme Court declared the specific rights set of for criminal defendants. The Miranda warning is the formal warning that is now required to be given by police in the United States to criminal suspects in police custody (or in a custodial situation) before they are interrogated, in accordance with the Miranda ruling.

== Recognition and rankings ==
Lewis Roca Rothgerber Christie attorneys were included in the 2016 "Best Law Firms" rankings by U.S. News & World Report.

== Locations ==
- Phoenix, Arizona
- Tucson, Arizona
- Los Angeles, California
- San Francisco, California
- Denver, Colorado
- Colorado Springs, Colorado
- Las Vegas, Nevada
- Reno, Nevada
