= Dickinson Dees =

- Date founded: 1975
- Company type: Limited Liability Partnership
- Dissolved: 2013
- Website: www.dickinson-dees.com

Dickinson Dees LLP was a law firm of the United Kingdom that traded between 1975 and 2013.

At its peak in 2005 the firm had 763 solicitors (including partners). By 2010 the firm had reduced this number to 327 solicitors through restructuring. In 2012, the firm came last in a national survey of legal professionals conducted by Rollonfriday

The firm had offices in Stockton on Tees, Leeds, Newcastle upon Tyne and London at the point it negotiated joining, Bristol based Bond Pearce. The successor firm was called Bond Dickinson and was headquartered in Bristol and then London. In November 2017, Bond Dickinson successfully negotiated joining an American law firm. The new firm is called Womble Bond Dickinson.
