= John Paul Frank =

American lawyer and scholar (1917–2002)

- Born: November 10, 1917; Appleton, Wisconsin, U.S.
- Died: September 7, 2002 (aged 84); Scottsdale, Arizona, U.S.
- Education: University of Wisconsin-Madison (BA, MA); University of Wisconsin School of Law (LLB); Yale Law School (SJD)
- Occupations: Lawyer, author
- Known for: Expert on Constitutional law

John Paul Frank (November 10, 1917 – September 7, 2002) was an American lawyer and scholar involved in landmark civil rights, school desegregation, and criminal procedure cases before the United States Supreme Court.

== Biography ==
Frank attended the University of Wisconsin and obtained a B.A. and M.A. in history. In 1940, Frank graduated with an LL.B. from the University of Wisconsin Law School with Order of the Coif honors. He clerked for Justice Hugo Black of the U.S. Supreme Court from 1942 to 1943. Frank spent the next two years as the assistant to the Secretary of the Interior and then to the U.S. Attorney General. He studied at Yale Law School and obtained a S.J.D. in 1947. In 1946, he joined the faculty of the Indiana University, Bloomington School of Law. He returned to Yale Law School to teach from 1949 to 1954, when he joined the law firm of Lewis & Roca in Phoenix, Arizona.

== Notable legal activity ==
Frank helped then-Chief Counsel for the NAACP Legal Defense and Educational Fund, Thurgood Marshall, formulate strategy in the school desegregation case of Brown v. Board of Education of Topeka (1954). Frank argued the case of Miranda v. Arizona (1966), which required that police inform criminal suspects of their rights. In Bates v. State Bar of Arizona (1977), Frank unsuccessfully argued before the U.S. Supreme Court that state bar limits on attorney advertising were consistent with the right to free speech under the First Amendment.

Frank's papers are held at the Library of Congress.

== Personal life ==
In 1940, he married Lorraine Weiss (June 7, 1923 – December 22, 2005), a graduate of Vassar College, and they had five children.

== Selected publications ==
- Frank, John P. (1995). Friedman, Leon; Israel, Fred L. (eds.). The Justices of the United States Supreme Court: Their Lives and Major Opinions. Chelsea House Publishers. ISBN 978-0-7910-1377-9.
- Frank, John Paul (1964). Justice Daniel Dissenting: A Biography of Peter V. Daniel, 1784–1860 (E-dition ed.). Cambridge, MA: Harvard University Press. ISBN 9780674331945.
- Frank, John Paul (1961). Lincoln as a lawyer. Champaign, IL: University of Illinois Press. ISBN 0962529028.
- Frank, John Paul (1958). Marble palace: the Supreme Court in American life. New York, NY: Knopf. ISBN 9780837162041.

== See also ==
- List of law clerks for the first seat of the Supreme Court of the United States
