= Embassy of Cuba, London =

Embassy of Cuba in London
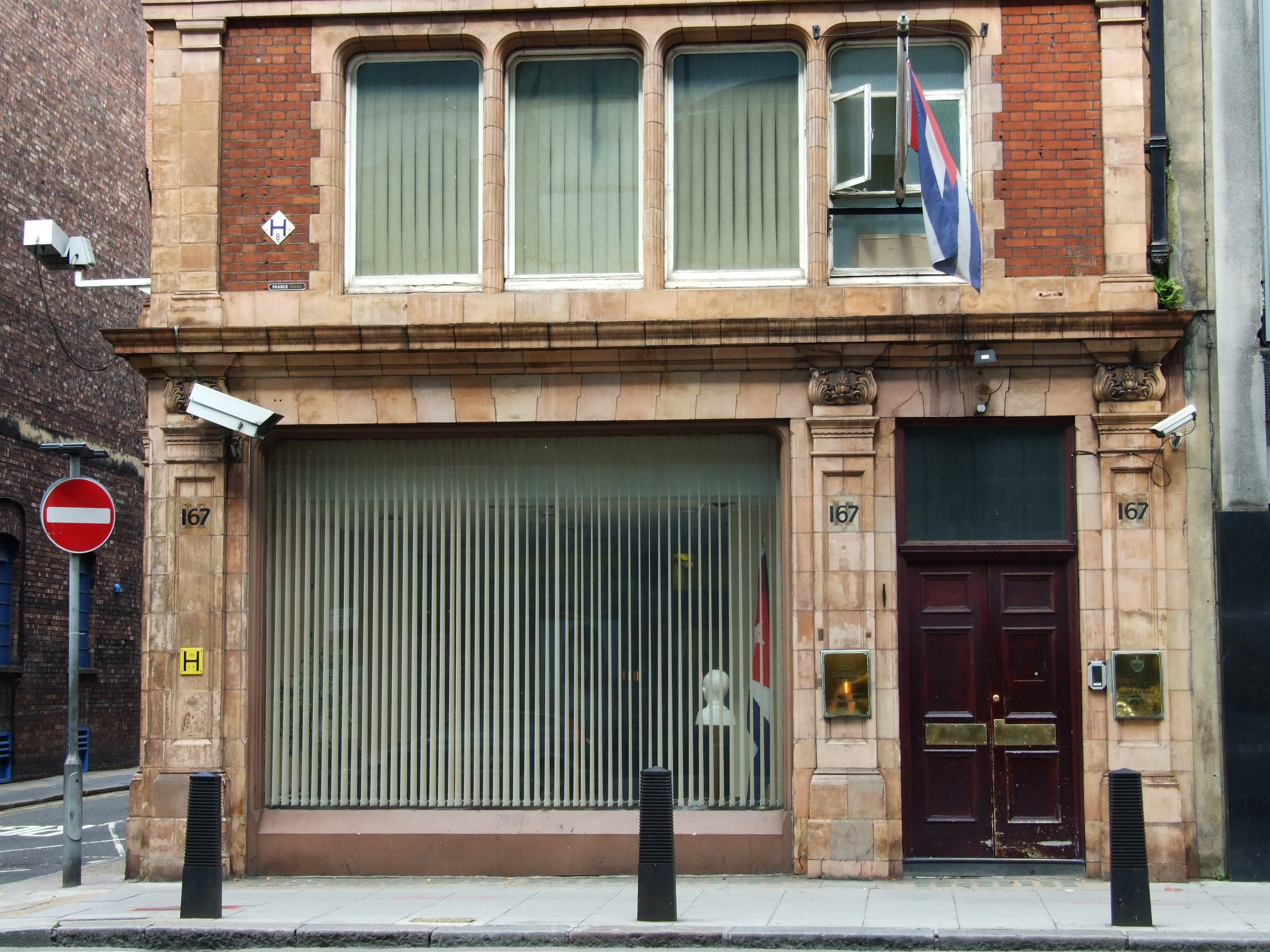
- Location: St Giles, London
- Address: 167 High Holborn, London, WC1 6PA
- Coordinates: 51°30′58.1″N 0°7′31.4″W
- Ambassador: Ismara Mercedes Vargas Walter

The Embassy of Cuba in London is the diplomatic mission of Cuba in the United Kingdom. The Ambassador is Her Excellency Ismara Mercedes Vargas Walter.

== Gallery ==
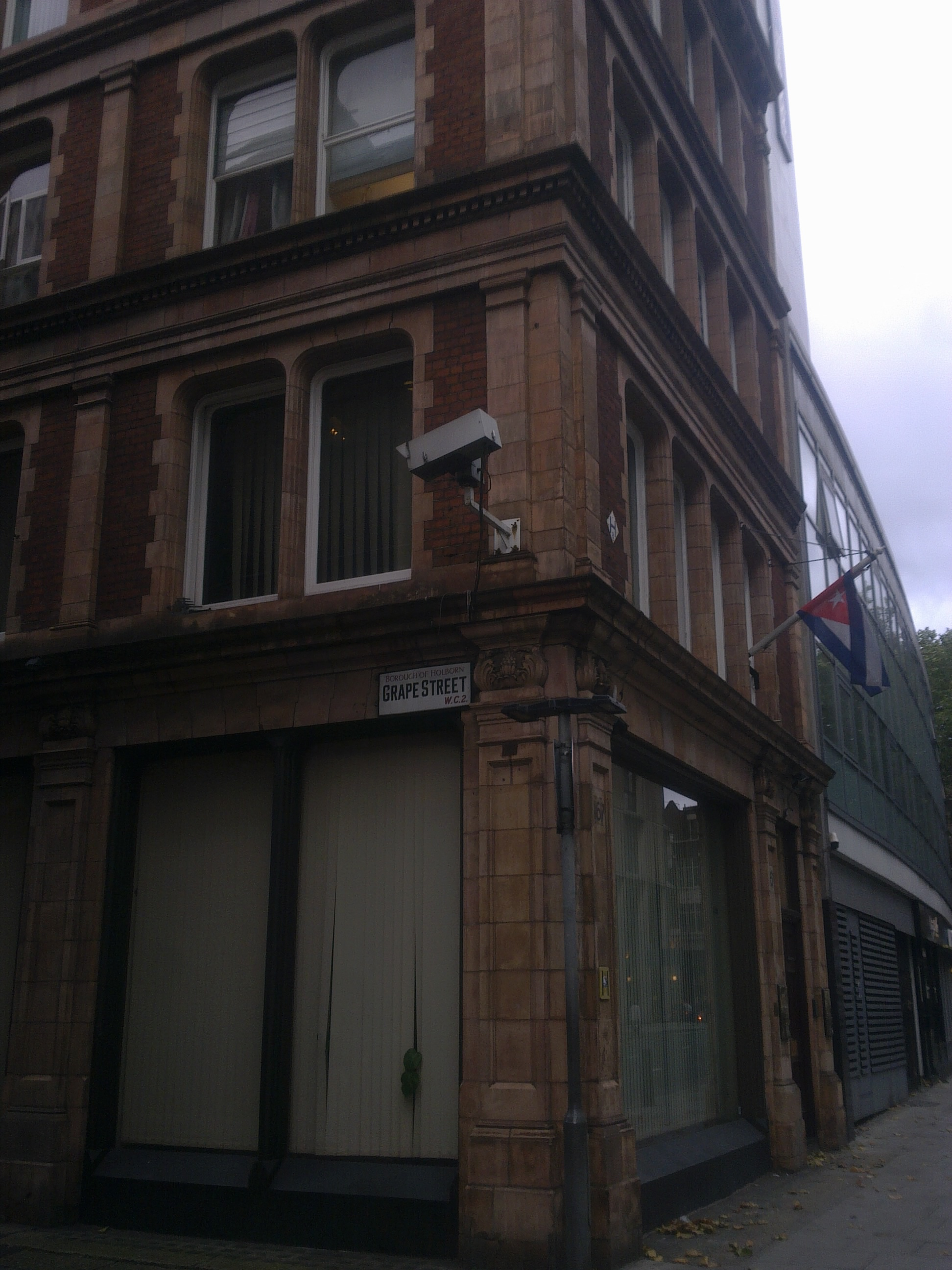
The embassy

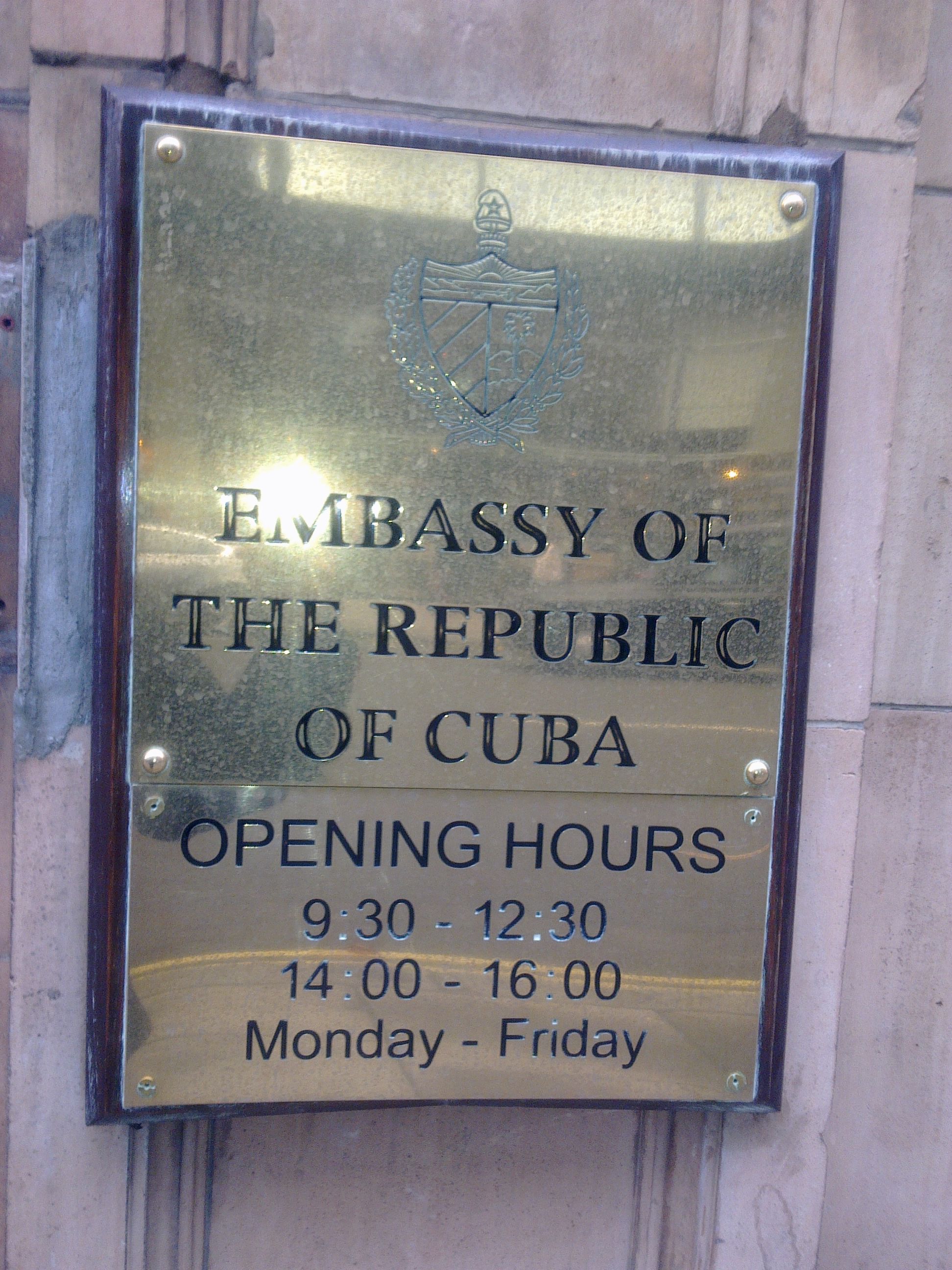
Plaque outside the embassy depicting the Coat of arms of Cuba
