= Jack Russell Weinstein =

American philosopher (born 1969)

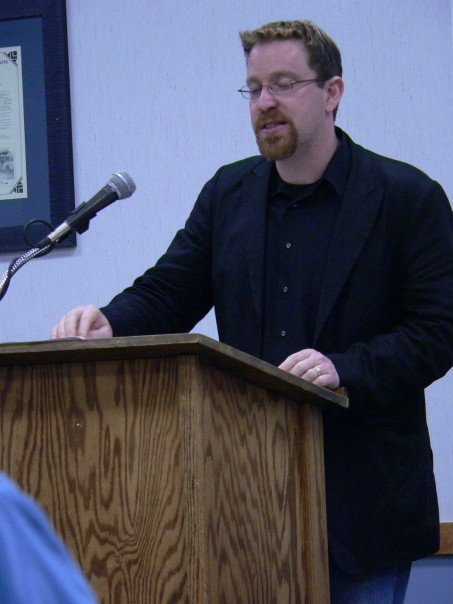
Jack Russell Weinstein presented the keynote address at the 2007 UND Undergraduate Philosophy Conference.

Jack Russell Weinstein (born October 1, 1969) is an American philosopher specializing in the history of philosophy, political philosophy, Adam Smith, and contemporary liberal theory. He is currently a Chester Fritz Distinguished Professor in the Department of Philosophy and Religion at the University of North Dakota. He is the director of The Institute for Philosophy in Public Life and the host of the public radio show Why? Philosophical discussions about everyday life. He was an influential student activist in the 1980s.

== Life and education ==
Jack Russell Weinstein was born on October 1, 1969, in New York City to painter Joyce Ellen, and American Jazz musician Mark Weinstein. He attended college at the State University of New York at Plattsburgh. It was there that his academic interest flourished, where he was able to pursue his long-held interests in reading, writing, and learning in the free university environment. He began his studies in English but quickly changed to Philosophy with a minor in Political Science. While in school, Weinstein participated actively in politics and became a political organizer for student issues around New York state. Receiving his undergraduate diploma in 1991, he went on to graduate school at Boston University, where he received his M.A. in 1996 and Ph.D. in 1998, both in Philosophy.

Weinstein was named plaintiff in a class action suit (Cianfrocco & Weinstein v. Clinton County Board of Elections, 1989—the name is not exact) intended to give college students in New York the right to vote in their college towns, and leading a contingent of over a hundred students who marched on the State House in Albany, New York. That same day, his image appeared in the front page of more than fifty newspapers across the state. He and others were protesting tuition hikes in the State University System by hosting a mock funeral to portray "the death of public education." The image showed Weinstein lying blindfolded by a baby's coffin.

He married Kim Donehower, and the two had their daughter in 2005. Adina Weinstein is a North Dakotan political activist.

== Work ==
Weinstein currently teaches at the University of North Dakota. In 2007, he received the Individual Excellence in Undergraduate Teaching Award at UND.

Weinstein is the author of four books, two in the Wadsworth Philosophers Series, On Adam Smith (2001) and On MacIntyre (2003), Adam Smith's Pluralism: Rationality, Education, and the Moral Sentiments (Yale U.P.), and Israel, Palestine, and the Trolley Problem: On the Futility of the Search for the Moral High Ground (The Digital Press of the University of North Dakota, 2024). The latter is an open-source publication and is available for free download. He has edited several collections and journals, as well as numerous articles, essays and reviews on topics such as philosophy of education and moral theory, as well as a number of presentations on the philosophy of Adam Smith. He is committed to the project of advancing public philosophy, working with the Institute for Philosophy in Public Life to bring philosophy to the general public while simultaneously making a place for public philosophy work in the academy.

Weinstein's current academic project is a restructuring of contemporary liberal political theory, building off of the moral psychology and political economy of Adam Smith. In multiple volumes, Weinstein plans to offer an interpretation of Adam Smith that views his Theory of Moral Sentiments as primary and offer its connection to contemporary liberal theory. According to Weinstein, the book will ultimately elaborate on the idea that "Adam Smith's moral psychology offers us the framework by which we can rescue the notion of neutrality from its indefensible understanding as an Archimedean point of view."

He elaborates on his moral psychology in Israel, Palestine, and the Trolley Problem, by arguing that moral theories are not “mutually exclusive,” as they appear “in the classroom.” Instead, “in the real world,” they are “hierarchical”:

Most of the time, people make moral decisions unreflectively, the way the Greeks described it. They are agents acting according to who they are as people….Sometimes, however, people are faced with a complex problem that can’t be resolved by habit or intuition, so good people fall back on stated moral principles, as Kant describes it….When acting intuitively as good people of good character no longer guides us, and when we have no moral principles to fall back on, the best of us become consequentialists and try to do the greatest good or the least harm. As J.S. Mill puts it in Utilitarianism, the only proof that the greatest happiness principle is true is that in the end, everyone believes it.

Weinstein's blog PQED: Philosophical Questions About Everyday Life has inspired controversy. His post "How should people respond to open-carry gun-rights activists?" went viral, and was cited both positively and negatively throughout the blogosphere and traditional media, such as Fox News Radio, which interviewed him. It landed him on the Professor Watchlist, a slight that led to an impassioned defense of his voice by his local newspaper The Grand Forks Herald.

He wrote the official biography of Nobel Prize winner Amartya Sen, that was read at The White House when Sen won the National Humanities Medal. He has also repeatedly called attention to the antisemitism that exists in North Dakota, his city, and his university, most notably in testimony before the United States Commission on Civil Rights.

Weinstein's additional areas of research is the systematizing of public philosophy as a sub-discipline. In particular, his two essays, The Case Against Political Philosophy (2022) and What Does Public Philosophy Do: Hint: It Does Not Make Better Citizens (2014), he argues that public philosophy should be seen as a sub-discipline in itself, and not a form of political editorializing or a dumbing-down of the more academic philosophical inquiry.

Weinstein's public philosophy advocates for taking podcasts and other general-audience material seriously as philosophical contributions, and cites interviews, podcasts, and blogs alongside academic journals and books. He has intentionally introduced three new philosophical notions in this public medium. First, he coins the informal fallacy, the “I Got Mine Jack, fallacy” defined as “just because a solution worked adequately for particular individuals, it does not follow that the same solution is applicable to all. This may be understood as a sub-fallacy of the appeal to authority, presuming that the person who makes the error regards their experience as normative. It may also be considered a form of generalizing from the particular, in that one instance is fallaciously regarded as representative of all others.”

Next, he suggested two modifications of Poe's Law, which he does not name. The first one is "given enough emotional commitment, it becomes impossible to distinguish between advocacy and trolling." The second is "...when faced with true emotional exhaustion, apathy and resignation are impossible to tell apart." He elaborates on this by providing these examples:

"online voices speak with the same desperate passion about starving war victims as they do about whether “Star Wars: The Last Jedi” has tainted the fictional character, Luke Skywalker. We are also immersed in a political reality under which most of us feel the same lethargy about washing dishes as we do about the six mass shootings that just took place this past weekend. Our passions and outrage are misplaced; they target indiscriminately. Our acceptance of awfulness has drained us..."

Third, Weinstein has also argued that the world has experienced a second sexual revolution. “The 1960s put forth the idea that sex for pleasure was worth celebrating, and that women as well as men deserved to experience it. It’s a realization we’re still negotiating. The last decade, however, has seen what I call the digital sexual revolution. It has shown us that sex is something that can and will happen at great distances, that one need not touch another person to be intimate. With dating apps that create a veritable supermarket of potential partners, to toys someone’s lover can operate remotely, to telephones that give each of us the ability to create pornography on a whim, we have collectively acknowledged that while sex may still involve our own body, it does not necessarily involve someone else’s. The digital revolution reaffirms that eroticism is a product of the imagination before it is a byproduct of our physiology.”

== Selected bibliography ==
- Israel, Palestine, and the Trolley Problem: On the Futility of the Search for the Moral High Ground. Grand Forks: The Digital Press of the University of North Dakota, 2024.
- "The Case Against Public Philosophy", in A Companion to Public Philosophy, edited by Lee MacIntyre, Nancy McHugh, and Ian Olasov (Hoboken: John Wiley & Sons): 26–40.
- "What Does Public Philosophy Do? (Hint: It Does Not Make Better Citizens)'< Essays in Philosophy 13:1 (2014): 33–57.
- Adam Smith's Pluralism: Rationality, Education, and the Moral Sentiments. New Haven: Yale University Press, 2013.
- Guest Editor, On Second Thought ("The Philosophy Issue"), North Dakota Humanities Council, (June, 2010).
- "The Two Adams: Ferguson and Smith on Sympathy and Sentiment", in Adam Ferguson: A Reassessment, Philosophy, Politics and Society, edited by Eugene Heath and Vincenze Merolle (London: Rickering & Chatto Publishers, LTD, 2009.): 89–106.
- "Adam Smith", entry for the Internet Encyclopedia of Philosophy
- Guest Editor, "Symposium on Adam Smith and Education" The Adam Smith Review, No. 3 (2007): 49–158.
- "On the Meaning of the Term 'Progressive': A Philosophical Investigation," The William Mitchell Law Review 33:1 (2006), 1–50.
- Is Money All There Is? Other Aspects of Life in Adam Smith's Free Market. North Dakota Humanities Council Larry Remele Fellowship Tabloid (4 pages with essay and interview), 2005.
- On MacIntyre (Wadsworth Philosophers Series). Belmont: Wadsworth Publishing Company, 2003.
- On Adam Smith (Wadsworth Philosophers Series). Belmont: Wadsworth Publishing Company, 2001.
- Guest Editor, Inquiry: Critical Thinking Across the Disciplines. Special Issue: Political Philosophy and Critical Thinking. Montclair: Institute for Critical Thinking, vol. 18, no. 1 (Autumn, 1998).
- Editor, Academic Inquiry: in Progress. Vienna: Institute for Human Sciences (Institut für die Wissenschaften vom Menschen), 1995.

== See also ==
- American philosophy
- List of American philosophers
- List of Jewish American philosophers
