= Public philosophy =

Engagement of philosophy in public venues

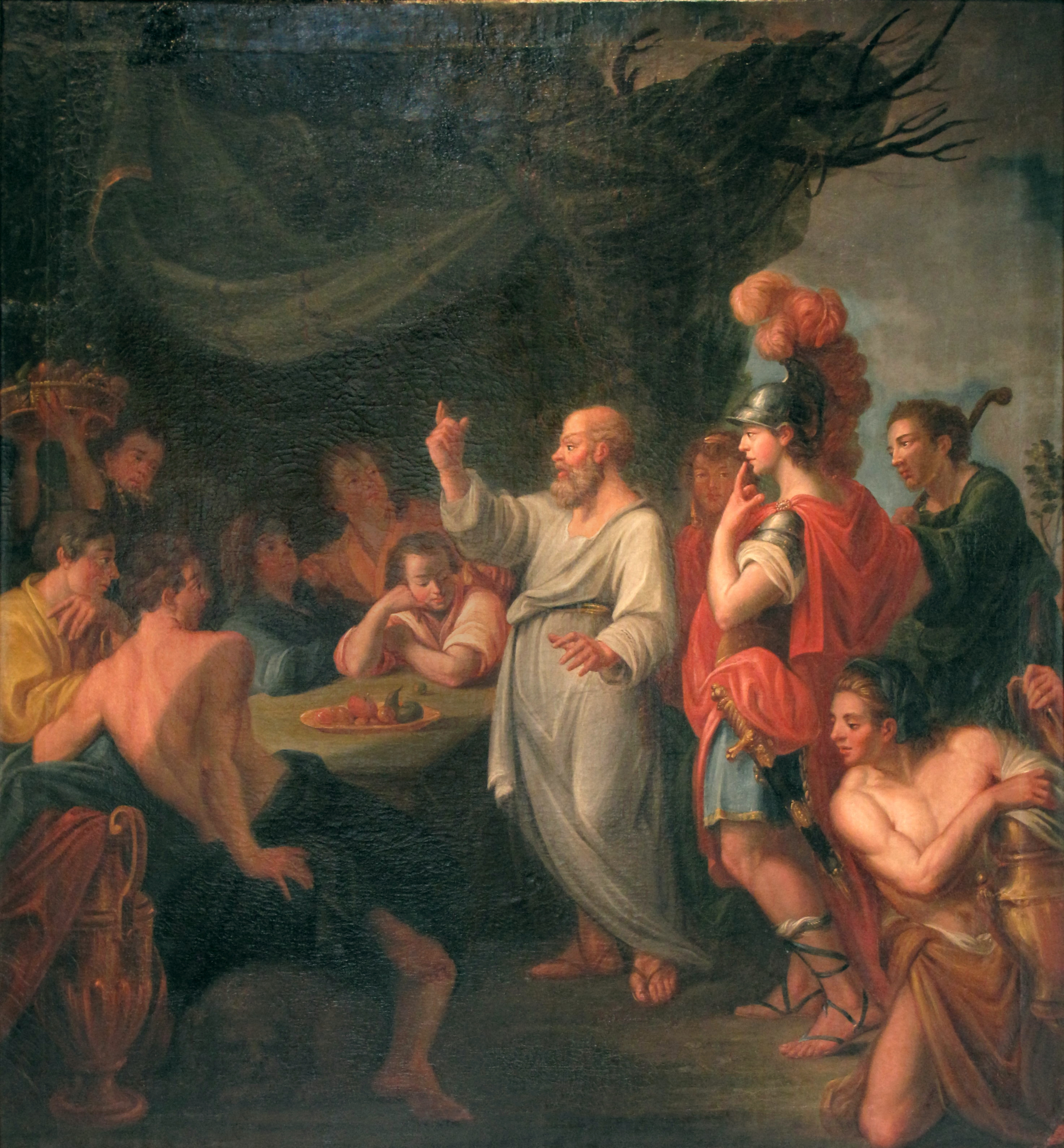
Socrates' philosophy involved engagement with the general public of Athens

Public philosophy is a subfield of philosophy that involves engagement with the public.

== Definition ==
Jack Russell Weinstein defines public philosophy as "doing philosophy with general audiences in a non-academic setting". It must be undertaken in a public venue but might deal with any philosophical issue. Michael J. Sandel describes public philosophy as having two aspects. The first is to "find in the political and legal controversies of our day an occasion for philosophy". The second is "to bring moral and political philosophy to bear on contemporary public discourse". James Tully emphasizes that public philosophy is done through practice, through the contestable concepts of citizenship, civic freedom, and nonviolence. According to Sharon Meagher, one of the founders of the Public Philosophy Network, "'public philosophy' is not simply a matter of doing philosophy in public, but must also engage with the community it finds itself in".

== Exemplars ==
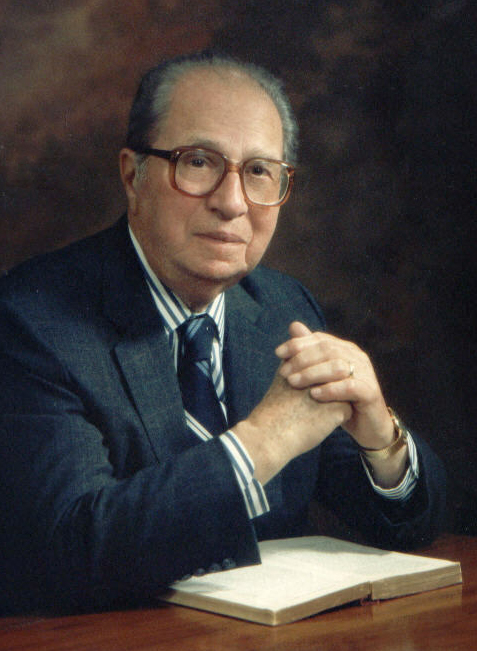
"Unlike many of my contemporaries, I never write books for my fellow professors to read. I have no interest in the academic audience at all. [...] A general audience can read any book I write – and they do." — Mortimer J. Adler

The Ancient Greek philosopher Socrates has been considered to be the "first public philosopher." He engaged with the general public of Athens, discussing issues of importance to them. In the modern day, some public philosophers are academic professionals, such as Mortimer J. Adler, Jürgen Habermas, Martha Nussbaum, Richard Rorty, James Tully, Jack Russell Weinstein, and Cornel West. Others may work outside of the usual academic contexts of teaching and writing for peer-reviewed journals, such as social activist Jane Addams and novelist Ayn Rand.

Jack Russell Weinstein, director of The Institute for Philosophy In Public Life, contends that although it is commonplace to argue that public philosophy promotes democracy, this argument assumes philosophers are better citizens than non-philosophers.

== See also ==
- Public history
- Public intellectual
- Public theology
