= High Holborn =

Street in Holborn, London

Coordinates: 51°31′04″N 0°07′11″W

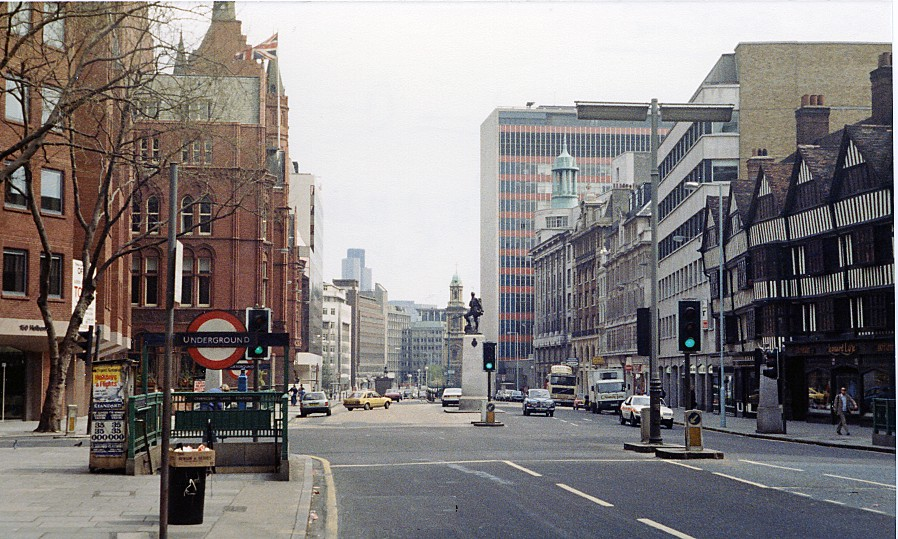
High Holborn in 1984. On the right is Staple Inn, with its distinctive timber-framed façade, and in the centre of the street is the Royal London Fusiliers Monument

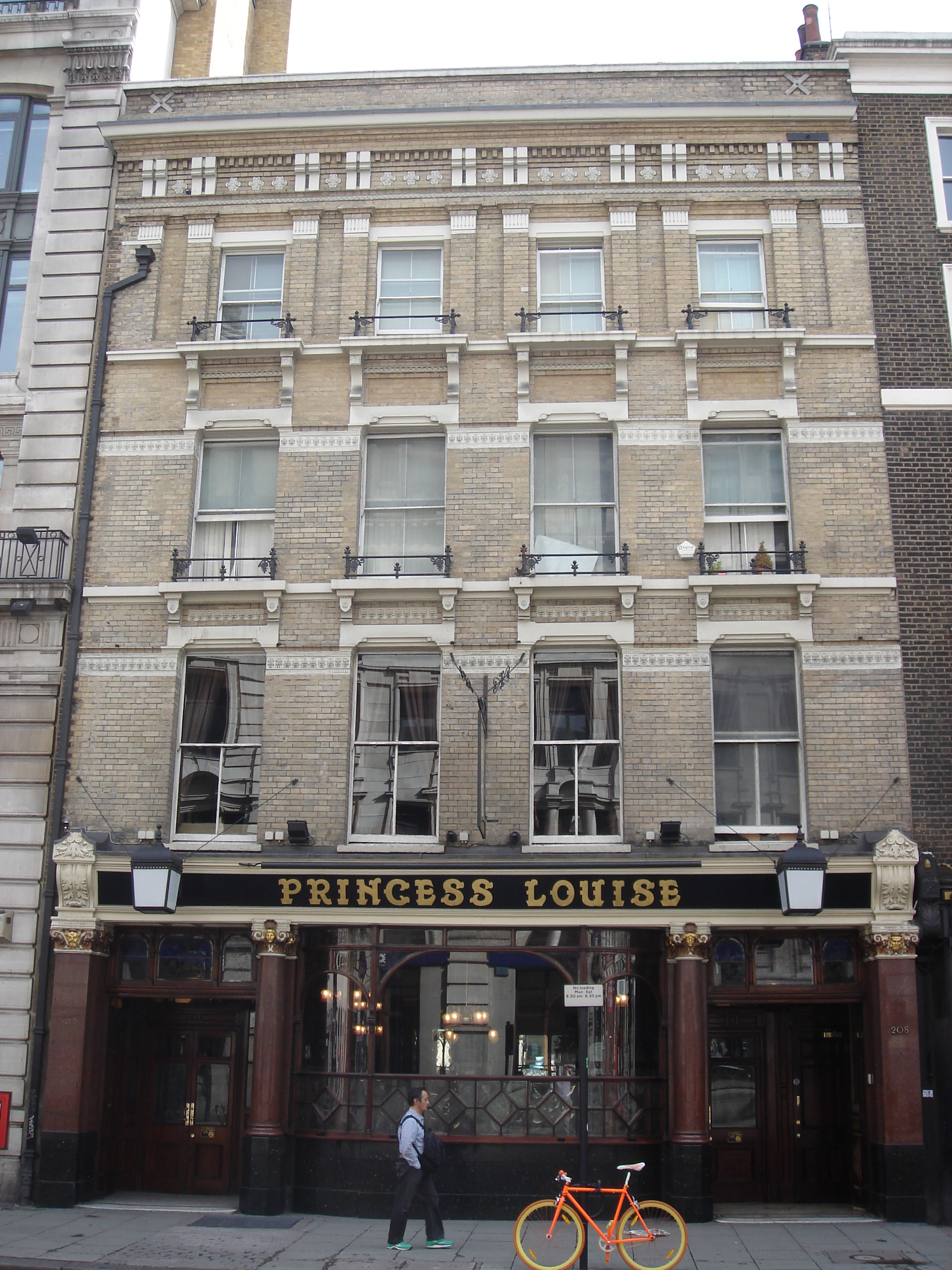
Princess Louise public house, High Holborn

High Holborn (/ˈhoʊbərn/ HOH-bərn) is a street in Holborn and Farringdon Without, Central London, which forms a part of the A40 route from London to Fishguard. It starts in the west at the eastern end of St Giles High Street and runs past the Kingsway and Southampton Row, becoming Holborn at its eastern junction with Gray's Inn Road. The western stretch, as far as Drury Lane, was formerly known as Broad Street. On High Holborn, traffic (including cycles and buses) flows one-way westbound from its junction with Drake Street to its western end, and flows both ways for the remainder.

The nearest London Underground stations are Tottenham Court Road, Holborn, and Chancery Lane, all on the Central line which runs beneath High Holborn.

Landmarks along High Holborn include the Cittie of Yorke, at no. 22, and the Embassy of Cuba, at no. 167. The Cold War Kingsway telephone exchange was located underneath High Holborn. On the south side of High Holborn is Staple Inn, the half timbered facade of which dates from 1586 and is a Grade I listed building. Opposite is the Gothic Revival Holborn Bars building, built for the Prudential Assurance Company between 1885 and 1901; it is Grade II* listed. On an island in the roadway is the Royal Fusiliers War Memorial, which is surmounted by a bronze statue of an infantry soldier by Albert Toft.

The street was a "Feature site" for introduction of the Camden bench.

High Holborn is the highest point in the City of London. At 22 metres (72 feet) above sea level, High Holborn is the lowest county top in England, if one considers the City a county.
