= Deborah J. Israel =

American judge (born 1964)

Deborah Israel
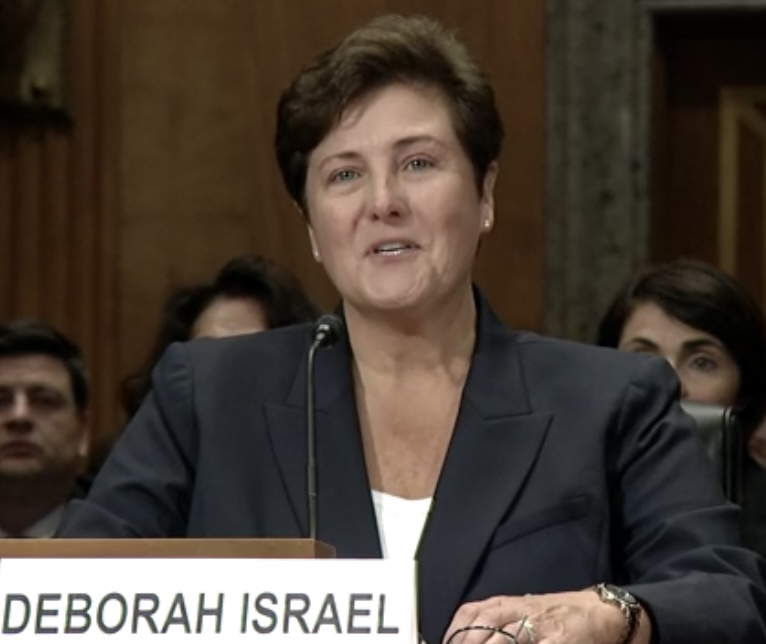

Associate Judge of the Superior Court of the District of Columbia
- Incumbent
- Assumed office November 21, 2019
- Nominated by: Donald Trump
- Preceded by: Melvin R. Wright

Personal details
- Born: Deborah Jean Israel; November 10, 1964 (age 61) Atlantic City, New Jersey, U.S.
- Education: Rutgers University (BA, JD)

Deborah Jean Israel (born November 10, 1964) is an associate judge of the Superior Court of the District of Columbia.

== Education and career ==
Israel was born in Atlantic City, New Jersey. In 1986, Israel earned her Bachelor of Arts from Rutgers University and in 1990, she received her Juris Doctor from Rutgers School of Law. She worked in private practice as a partner at DLA Piper, and later at Womble Bond Dickinson.

=== D.C. Superior Court ===
President Barack Obama nominated Israel on September 27, 2016, to become an associate judge on the Superior Court of the District of Columbia. Her nomination expired on January 3, 2017, with the end of the 114th United States Congress.

President Donald Trump nominated her on September 7, 2017, to the same court to the seat on the vacated by Melvin R. Wright. Her nomination expired on January 4, 2019, with the end of the 115th United States Congress. On May 2, 2019, President Trump renominated Israel to the same seat on the court. On October 22, 2019, the Senate Committee on Homeland Security and Governmental Affairs held a hearing on her nomination. The Senate confirmed her nomination on November 21, 2019, by voice vote.
