= Irving E. Carlyle Lecture Series =

Lecture Series at Wake Forest University

The Irving E. Carlyle Lecture Series at Wake Forest University was established in 1972 as a lectureship in American politics and named to honor Irving E. Carlyle. Distinguished figures and scholars in politics and journalism delivered annual lectures. The lectures are dated by the academic year in which they were given.

== Carlyle Lecture speakers ==
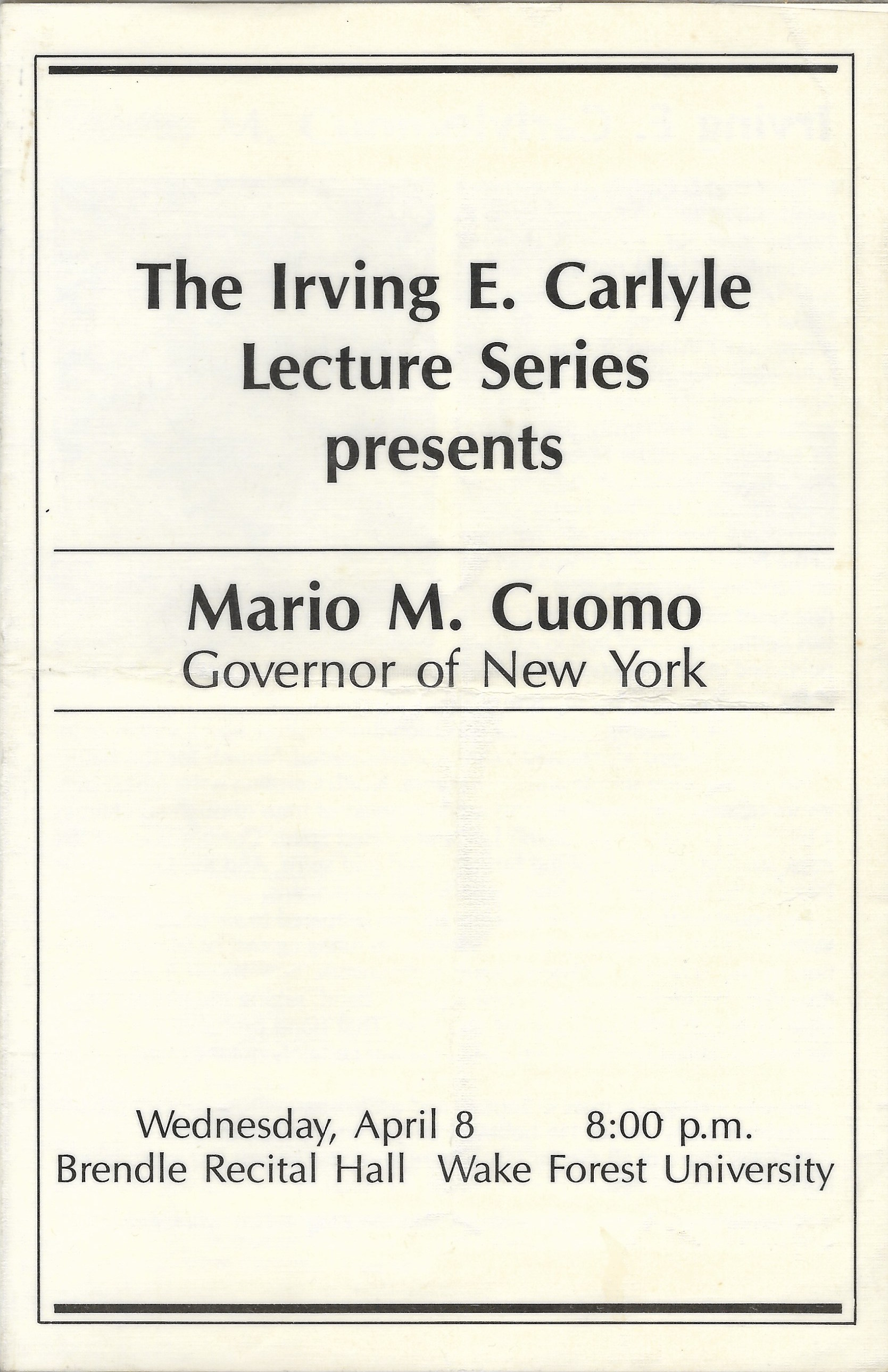

- James Reston 1972
- William F. Buckley (1973)
- Sargent Shriver 1974
- Shirley Chisolm First African American member of Congress (1975)
- George Will, Pulitzer Prize winner (1978)
- Bill Moyers, Journalist and former deputy director of the Peace Corps (1979)
- George McGovern (1981)
- Joseph Califano (1982)
- Gary Hart (1983)
- Jack Kemp (1984)
- Jimmy Carter (1985) (not in office)
- Mario Cuomo (1987)
- Joe Biden (1990)
