= Womble Bond Dickinson (UK) LLP =

Law Firm Company

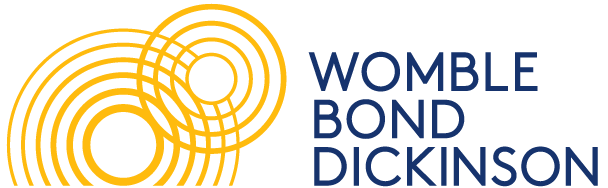
- Headquarters: London
- No. of offices: 27
- No. of attorneys: 940
- Major practice areas: General practice
- Key people: Paul Stewart, UK Managing Partner
- Revenue: ▲US$ 475M (2017)
- Date founded: 1876
- Company type: Limited Liability Partnership
- Website: womblebonddickinson.com/uk

Womble Bond Dickinson (UK) LLP is a law firm with 8 offices across the United Kingdom. In 2017, UK-based Bond Dickinson LLP and US-based Womble Carlyle Sandridge & Rice, LLP, merged, following a strategic alliance announced in 2016. The firm has 32 locations across the United States and the United Kingdom offering services in 12 different sectors.

The combination created Womble Bond Dickinson (International) LLP; a company limited by guarantee in which Womble Bond Dickinson (UK) LLP and Womble Bond Dickinson (US) LLP, operate as separate non-profit-sharing partnerships.

== History ==
UK-based law firm Bond Dickinson LLP commenced trading on May 1, 2013. This alliance was a result of a merger between Dickinson Dees and Bond Pearce. Prior to the merger, Dickinson Dees (whose history dates back to 1975) registered as an LLP in 2006. Bond Pearce (founded in 1887) registered as an LLP in 2005.

Womble Carlyle's history dates back to 1876 and was named after its early partners including B.S. Womble and Irving E. Carlyle.

In January 2016, Womble Carlyle named Betty Temple chairwoman and CEO, and she became one of only a handful of women to sit at the helm of a large national law firm. Temple's appointment represented several milestones for Womble Carlyle. She became the youngest chairperson in the firm's 140-year history, the first chairperson to be located outside of the firm's original Winston-Salem office, and the first woman to lead the firm.

As part of Womble Carlyle Bond Dickinson, Temple is now United States CEO and co-chair with UK Managing Partner, Paul Stewart (appointed in February 2022).

Womble Bond Dickinson (US) LLP has continued to expand via mergers, including with Lewis Roca in September 2024 which created a firm with 1300 legal staff and a turnover of $742 million. However, it has also been rebuffed by some possible merger candidates, notably BDB Pitmans who rejected a merger bid in February 2023 over concerns about a 'poor cultural fit.'

== Controversies ==
=== Negligence cases ===
Womble Bond Dickinson has several times been accused of professional negligence. In 2018 they were accused of giving poor advice to a businessman, Mr Day, of not telling him he could be tried summarily in a magistrates court for an offence he had committed, rather than being tried on indictment where the penalties were £450,000 instead of £20,000. His civil suit against Womble Bond Dickinson was dismissed on the grounds it appeared to be an attempt to overturn a court verdict by other means, but the court did note that he would but for this have had legitimate grounds for a negligence claim as the advice he had been given was not correct.

In April 2024 Womble Bond Dickinson was sued for £126 million by a consortium of real estate developers after a large property deal in Kensington collapsed when Womble Bond Dickinson unnecessarily demanded a £1 million indemnity from the other party. As of February 2025, the case is ongoing.

=== Sexual harassment ===
In 2023 a senior partner at Womble Bond Dickinson was dismissed for sexually harassing junior female staff, following an external investigation.

=== Furlough money ===
Womble Bond Dickinson was accused of taking over £2 million from the British government in furlough money and then making staff redundant anyway. It subsequently repaid the money. It also made significant redundancies in its US operations and reduced staff pay by up to 10%. The controversy may have been a factor in the British government dropping Womble Bond Dickinson from the public sector legal panel, upon which Womble Bond Dickinson threatened to sue them for reputational damage before abandoning the idea.

=== Horizon scandal ===
Stephen Dilley, a partner with Womble Bond Dickinson, has been criticised for his role in the UK Post Office Scandal including by the professional magazine, The Lawyer. Dilley failed to disclose potentially relevant evidence during his conduct of the civil proceedings against Lee Castleton and resulting in a miscarriage of justice. Within a year of owning his sub post office in East Yorkshire, the then subpostmaster noticed glitches in the computer system that eventually showed around £25,000 in discrepancies. He described "begging" the Post Office helpline to explain to him what was going on, but instead the Post Office demanded, with scant evidence, repayment of funds for which they alleged he was "liable". He ended up in a High Court case conducted by Dilley that "sapped" Castleton of all his money. Castleton was made to repay that money plus legal costs of £321,000, which ended up bankrupting him and tearing up his family.

Dilley later attended the associated public inquiry as a witness as part of the examination of knowledge of and responsibility for failures in disclosure in the conduct of the litigation.

Part of the evidence supplied to the inquiry included an email written by Stephen Dilley on 31 October 2006 showing that he was aware that Horizon could lose transactions, however this too was not disclosed to the court as part of the Castleton civil proceedings.

Dilley was then working for Bond Pearce; "A major new law firm launched on May 1 [2013] with the merger of Bond Pearce and Dickinson Dees to create Bond Dickinson." Four years later, "the partners of UK-based Bond Dickinson LLP and US-based Womble Carlyle Sandridge & Rice LLP have voted to combine as equal members in a new entity under the name Womble Bond Dickinson."

Dilley denies any wrongdoing. According to The Law Society Gazette, Dilley explained his failure to disclose thousands of issues raised about the Horizon IT system was out of concern he would be 'swamped' by disclosure; it seemed "onerous". However, between 2021 and 15 September 2023 his published case "list of experience" was amended to delete all mention of Post Office v Castleton [2007] EWHC 5(QB). Mr Dilley's view of his own "behaviour and attitude towards the Castleton case" and its impact on the innocent defendant and his family is summarised in an article by Nick Wallis, author of "Great Post Office Scandal" as "Nothing personal, Mr Castleton. It's just justice."

Andrew Parsons, another partner at the firm, was also revealed to have advised the Post Office to destroy relevant documents so they could not be disclosed and also to not minute meetings so that no record would be kept of them. When the emails in which this advice was given initially came to light, Parsons blamed a junior trainee for writing them, and denied ever having advised failing to minute meetings. When it was later demonstrated this was false, he claimed loss of memory and claimed he did not mean what he had written as it was poorly phrased. Womble Bond Dickinson declined to comment on the story when questioned.

== See also ==
- List of 100 largest UK law firms
- List of 100 largest European law firms
