= International trade and state security =

International economic structures range from complete autarky to complete market openness. This structure has undergone numerous changes since the beginning of the nineteenth century. The state-power theory as put into perspective by Stephen Krasner (1976), explains that the structure of international trade is determined by the interests and power of states acting to maximize their aggregate national income, social stability, political power and economic growth. Such state interests can be achieved under free trade.

The relationship between these interests and the level of openness depends upon the economic power of states. Power is dependent upon a states size and level of economic development.

Krasner contends that distributions of potential power may vary from multipolar to hegemonic; and different international trading structures are made of either of these. The key to this argument is that a hegemonic distribution of potential economic power is likely to result in an open trading system. Since states act to maximize their aggregate economic utility, maximum global welfare is achieved under free trade.

Neoclassical trade theory posits that the greater the degree of openness in the international trading system, the greater the level of aggregate economic income.

== Theoretical perspectives ==
=== Realism ===
Robert Gilpin and Stephen Krasner are advocates of the realist tradition, which emphasizes the hegemonic system. The hegemonic system contends that there are states that are much larger and more developed than their trading partners and therefore, the costs and benefits of openness are not symmetrical for all members of the system. Krasner (1976) contends that the hegemonic state will have a preference for an open structure because it will increase its aggregate national income and power.

Realism emphasizes states' demands for power and security. Military force is therefore, the most important power resource. States must rely ultimately on their own resources and must strive to maintain their power positions in the system, even at high economic costs. For realism, the most important variables are the economic and military strength of hegemonic states; and international hostilities are mainly because of variations in the distribution of political-military capabilities between states.

==== Hegemonic stability ====
The theory of hegemonic stability by the realist school argues that dominance of one country is necessary for the existence of an open and stable international economy. The relationship between hegemony and an open, stable economy has been challenged by some scholars “As US behavior during the interwar period illustrates, the possession of superior resources by a nation does not translate automatically into great influence or beneficial outcomes for the world.”

==== Development policy ====
Realist trade encourages Import substitution industrialization (ISI) replacing imports with domestic production. Realism recognizes that trade regulations can be used to correct domestic distortions and to promote new industries.

Under realism, states possess a high degree of discretionary power to influence many variables and prices in the economy. The government influences the distribution of investment, thus protecting national industries.

==== International institutions ====
Realists with their focus on power and the struggle for survival in an anarchical world, criticize the role of international institutions that govern the world economy, such as the World Bank, World Trade Organization (WTO), EU, and the International Monetary Fund (IMF). Scholars argue that the influence exerted by international institutions is dependent upon the states that form part of them, and therefore international institutions have little independent impact. Accordingly, the realist school emphasizes the impact of state power over the strength of the institution per se.

=== Liberalism ===
The liberal tradition consists of two schools of thought on the causes of peace, one emphasizing representative government and international institutions and the other advocating global markets and economic development.

Liberalism traces back to Immanuel Kant. Kantian Liberalism posits that democracy, economic interdependence and international organizations are optimal solutions for reducing the incidence of conflict. It is not individual factors, which lead to a more peaceful world, but rather all three elements working in conjunction, which eliminates conflict.

Oneal and Russett's (2001) research design has become a standard choice of replications in studies assessing the Kantian peace triangle where democracies tend to be interdependent and members of the same International Government Organizations (IGOs). Their research is consistent with the argument that democratic peace advocates economic interdependence and a joint need to attain membership in IGOs in order to prevent the incidence of conflict. However, the empirical findings on the Kantian peace triangle as a joint force to eliminate conflict presents some limitations, as one study found that the three Kantian peace variables are less robust in explaining leaders’ conflict behavior. Keohane and Nye (2000) go further to include the lack of additional components in this theory including environmental and military measurements.

==== Trade ====
Liberals emphasize two main aspects of the benefits of trade. First, trade promotes states to work together and cooperatively, reinforcing peaceful relations among trading partners. The second benefit is based on the expected utility model of trade and conflict which emphasizes the potential economic consequences of a disruption in trade. Countries are therefore deterred from initiating conflict against a trading partner for fear of losing the welfare gains associated with trade.

==== Interdependence ====
Liberals argue that economic interdependence between states reduces conflict because conflict discourages commerce.

Recent cost-benefit calculations of trade take into account information as an important component in the explanation of the pacifying aspect of economic interdependence. Through open trade, states reveal their intentions and capabilities and thus “relations become more transparent and reduce uncertainty.”

Furthermore, economic interdependence makes costly signals possible. If military action did not entail loss, national leaders would not be able to communicate their capabilities and resolve. This acts as a deterrent and promotes peace between states. “Mechanisms that facilitate the transmission of credible information across international boundaries limit bargaining failure, enhancing interstate peace.”

There is some disagreement about the interdependence liberal thesis among some scholars. Kenneth Waltz, for example, argues that since "close interdependence means closeness of contact and raises the prospect of at least occasional conflict . . . the [liberal] myth of interdependence . . . asserts a false belief about the conditions that may promote peace."

Despite the scrutiny, there is a long-held position that economic interdependence has a pacifying effect on interstate relations, evidenced by research conducted by Oneal & Russett 1999 and Xiang et al. 2007.

According to the liberal view, the costly nature of conflict is central to contemporary bargaining theory.

Keohane & Nye (1987) put forth four conditions that make the use of force by large states costly:

1. Risks of nuclear escalation
2. Resistance by people in poor or weak countries
3. Uncertain and possibly negative effects on the achievement of economic goals
4. Domestic opinion opposed to the human costs of the use of force

==== Development policy ====
Liberal trade encourages export led growth (ELG), leaving traders and consumers dependent on foreign markets. Liberals argue that these actors have an incentive to avoid hostilities with their trading partners, since any disruption in commercial relations would be costly.

==== International institutions ====
International institutions are a key feature of the liberal peace, because they represent credible signals of resolve to defend member states in times of crisis, regulate state behavior, facilitate communication and create common security interests between member states.

== The argument about trade and conflict ==
The relationship between international trade and conflict has been a source of controversy among international relations scholars. Some scholars argue that trade does not reduce conflict even though conflict reduces trade; while others report that international trade fosters a peaceful disposition among states, which are less likely to resort to armed conflict in times of crisis.

The argument that open trade inhibits conflict dates back to the classical liberal movement of free trade and world peace. This view argues that increasing interaction among traders and consumers (interdependence) promotes peace; free trade fosters a sense of international community that reduce interstate conflict and tensions. Liberals posit that free markets and economic development contribute to a reduction in interstate conflict. The contrasting contemporary view is that open trade dampens political conflict by promoting economic dependence.

Economic dependence has negative consequences for interstate conflict. Albert O. Hirschman (1945) for example, has pointed out that the “gains from trade do not accrue to states proportionately and the distribution of these gains can affect interstate power relations. Moreover, shifts in power relations are widely regarded as a potent source of military conflict.”

=== Economic interdependence ===
Economic interdependence and greater openness exposes domestic economies to the exigencies of the world market. Social instability is therefore increased by exposure to international competition. This negative force undermines the Kantian peace and remains a cause for concern in international conflict. Although this concern seems legitimate given the economic disparities between developed and developing countries, studies fail to provide comprehensive empirical evidence.

Another view at odds with liberalism is that technological innovation and industrialization increase the ability of some countries to exercise power. As trade flows and the level of interdependence increases, so do the incentives for states to take military actions to reduce their economic vulnerability.

The adverse effect of trade on state security is difficult to determine, however the more competition, the more aggressive the environment. Openness and competition increases social instability because domestic prices need to adjust to changes in international prices. Consistent with the realists view that states are essentially always in conflict, social instability and resource competition are motives for conflict and states will rely on the use of force to attain their own political goals and interests.

=== The role of military power ===
A number of international relations scholars, notably Xiang, Xu & Keteku 2007; Mearsheimer 2001, recognize the role of military power in initiating conflict, as well as the role militarily powerful countries play in international trade. One argument suggests that militarily capable countries are more likely to have the motivation to initiate armed conflict due to their awareness of their capabilities and to their confidence in achieving favorable outcomes.

A second argument suggests that power facilitates trade. Third, there are positive benefits from economic interdependence on military power. Finally, the economic stature of a country determines both the military power and level of trade of that country, hinting that economic powerful states trade more. Because powerful countries are better positioned to take advantage of the benefits resulting from international trade and to transform welfare gains into military power, they also are more likely to use force when their positions are threatened.

Similarly, Gartzke & Hewitt (2010) argue that the “extension of economic and other interests beyond national borders increases incentives to police relevant regions and exercise influence, sometimes through force.”

=== Unequal peace ===
The motives for conflict, which historically were concentrated among the powerful and their ambitious challengers, are today clustered among the poor, and between the poor and the rich (Gartzke & Hewitt (2010). Theory has prompted to inequality as a potential source of internal conflict. ”Inequalities within the same countries has increased, not through impoverishment of the masses, but because while wealth is created many people remain left behind in poverty. Thus, we have an unequal peace." Around 60 countries suffer not only from low GDP per capita but also low or negative growth. These countries tend to be caught in armed conflict among other development traps. Some argue that the evidence surrounding inequality and conflict remains inconclusive, calling for further empirical studies.

Studies show that states with the most dissimilar interests possess a motive for conflict but whether they experience conflict (or not) depends on external determinants of bargaining success or failure. These determinants include uncertainty about the balance of power, opponent's resolve as well as policy dissimilarities between competing states. Interests are important determinants of whether conflict occurs. According to Gartzke & Hewitt (2010), promoting democratic interests, or even imposing them for peace, is not likely to reduce conflict “it may even lead to a weakening of the actual determinants of liberal peace”, thereby increasing interstate tensions. Contemporary research demonstrates that promoting free markets and economic development helps mitigate conflict and promote peace

== Capitalist peace ==
The capitalist peace thesis suggests that free markets and economic development contribute to a reduction in interstate conflict.

Research on the capitalist peace has chosen to pursue the liberal political economy school, with a particular focus on Kant's Perpetual Peace. The same set of theoretical frameworks that evolved in democratic peace research now asserts itself in the capitalist peace (Gartzke & Hewitt 2010, p. 121).

The capitalist peace sees capitalism as creating conditions to make war more costly and therefore undesirable by trading states. Traditional interpretations of the capital peace contend that development and global markets will eventually eliminate resource competition as a motive for war. This view was eventually deemed outdated, as “it became clear that needed raw materials would continue to make their way to industrial centers through free markets, rather than through mercantilist autarkies (Gartzke & Hewitt, 2010, p. 122).

The capitalist theory contends that as economies become stronger, prosperous capitalist states no longer need to threaten one another over access to inputs to production. Consequently, the security dilemma loses its relevance.

Scholars like Michael Mousseau argue that democracies are only peaceful in pairs. Other research has demonstrated that the democratic peace is even more exclusive than previously imagined, limiting the finding to developed democracies. Gartzke and Hewitt (2010) challenged this by demonstrating that it is economic development and market freedoms, rather than political liberty that result in interstate peace.

=== Deterrent effect of institutional ties ===
International Government Organizations (IGOs) are designed to promote cooperation and inhibit political disputes. Institutional ties promote the exchange of information about the economic gains and losses of participating member states, thereby reducing uncertainty about the distribution of benefits.

Regional institutions also present great influence in addressing issues beyond trade. Regional economic institutions help develop trade expectations for the future. “High economic stakes that states have in the continuation and growth of economic activity in the context of economic regionalism lead to a security community in which states develop a genuine interest in not only keeping peace with each other, but also defending their relationship against outside aggressors.” In addition to their role in dispute settlement, regional arrangements can deter aggressors from targeting institutionally connected states.

Aydin (2010) makes an important contribution to the extended deterrence literature and economic peace research through his empirical study on the deterrent effect of economic integration. This study shows that trade has a general deterrent effect on attackers when the target is economically integrated with potential defenders through regional trade institutions. When trade is conducted in an institutionalized setting it can have political implications beyond bilateral interdependence.

Research shows that economic integration decreases the opportunities to fight and enhances the opportunities to intervene in crisis. Mansfield & Pevehouse (2000, p. 776) present strong evidence that “the combination of PTA membership (preferential trading arrangements) and a high level of trade is quite likely to discourage belligerence.”

Many PTAs have become venues for addressing political disputes between participants and fostering cooperation. Observers have widely acknowledged, for example, that ASEAN has helped to manage tensions in Southeast Asia. Mercado Comun del Sur (MERCOSUR) has done likewise, improving political-military relations throughout the southern cone. (Mansfield & Pevehouse, 2000, p. 781). The reciprocal nature of this system helps guarantee that economic concessions made by one state will be repaid, rather than exploited by its counterpart.

== International investment flows ==
Another area to add to the existing literature on economic integration is the impact of militarized conflict on foreign investment.

Bussman's (2010) contribution to the liberal notion that conflict inhibits foreign investment, complements the liberal peace arguments in conflict studies. Bussman's research shows that international conflict reduces international investment flows considerably.

Bussman contends that “as with trade, foreign investment could be an important factor in promoting peace. States might avoid violent conflict in order not to deter foreign investors.” By ensuring political stability, states can thus create an environment that is desirable to foreign investors. It is therefore, in the best interest of states to keep away from belligerent behaviour as they could potentially miss out on the welfare gains associated with foreign investment.

As a result, states that benefit from foreign direct investment flows are less likely to experience the onset of militarized conflict.

== See also ==
- International political economy
