= Irving E. Carlyle =

American lawyer and politician

Carlyle c. 1951

Irving Edward Carlyle (September 20, 1896 – June 6, 1971) was an American lawyer and politician.

== Early life ==
Carlyle was born on September 20, 1896, in Wake Forest, North Carolina, United States to John Bethune Carlyle and Dora Dunn Carlyle. His father was a professor at Wake Forest College.

Carlyle attended Wake Forest College. While he was there he played baseball and basketball and managed the football team. He majored in French and German, and graduated with a Bachelor of Arts summa cum laude in 1917. After having taken a six-week quiz course on law at Wake Forest College, Carlyle passed the North Carolina State Bar in 1920.

In 1928 Carlyle married Mary Belo Moore.

== Political career ==
In 1961 North Carolina Governor Terry Sanford appointed a Governor's Commission on Education Beyond the High School with Carlyle as its chairman. Commonly referred to as the "Carlyle Commission", the body produced a set of proposals in August 1962 aimed at increasing college enrollment in North Carolina. One of its recommendations was the consolidation of the state's "public junior colleges" and "industrial education centers" under a single system of community colleges. In May 1963 the General Assembly responded by creating a Department of Community Colleges under the State Board of Education.

Over time Carlyle came to be opposed to American involvement in the Vietnam War and served as cochairman of the North Carolina Committee to End the War in Indochina until his death.

In April 1971 Carlyle criticized the death penalty before the General Assembly, arguing that "Only the poor and uneducated blacks and occasionally a poor white are ever put to death by the state" and that thus the death penalty existed only "to keep the blacks in check."

== Death ==
Carlyle died from a heart attack early in the morning on June 6, 1971, at his desk in his home in Winston-Salem while working on a speech about the University of North Carolina. He was buried in Salem Cemetery. His alma mater created the Irving E. Carlyle Lecture Series in his honor.

== Works cited ==
- Covington, Howard E.; Ellis, Marion A., eds. (2002). The North Carolina Century: Tar Heels who Made a Difference, 1900–2000. Levine Museum of the New South. ISBN 9780807827574.
- Link, William A. (2018). North Carolina: Change and Tradition in a Southern State (second ed.). Hoboken, New Jersey: John Wiley & Sons, Inc. ISBN 9781118833605.
